= Laksoy =

Filipino distilled liquor

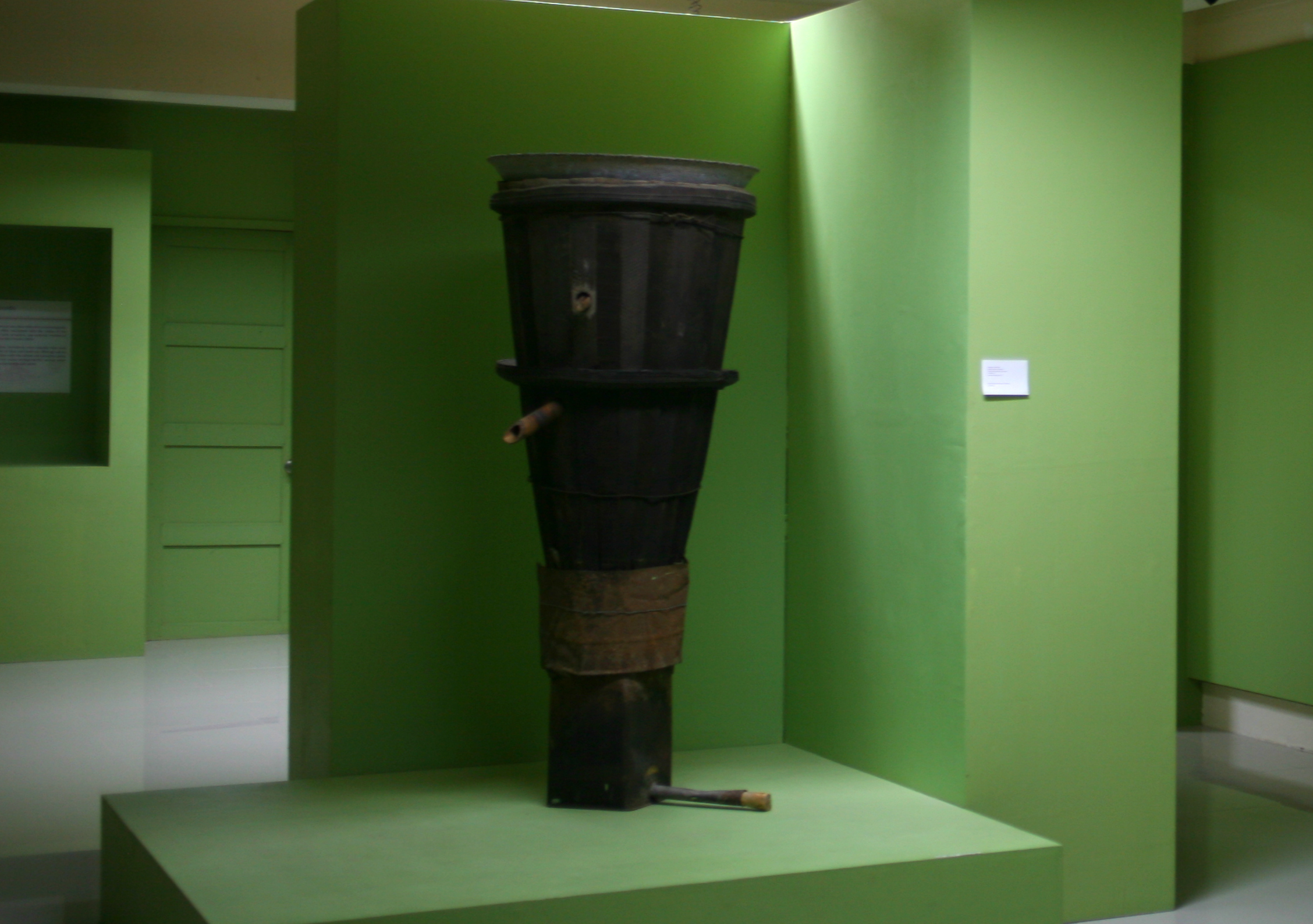
- A traditional still used for distilling laksoy in the Butuan National Museum
- Type: Palm liquor
- Origin: The Philippines, Eastern Mindanao, the Visayas, Bicol, Southern Luzon
- Alcohol by volume: 35–50%
- Ingredients: Nipa palm sap

Laksoy (also spelled lacsoy) is a traditional Filipino distilled nipa palm liquor. It is derived from tubâ (palm toddy) made from nipa palm sap which has been aged for at least 48 hours. It originates from Eastern Mindanao, the Visayas Islands, (where it is known as dalisay or dalisay de nipa), the Bicol Region (where it is known as barik), and Southern Luzon (where it is known as lambanog or lambanog sa sasa). During the Spanish colonial period, it was also known as vino de nipa in Spanish. It has a typical alcohol content of 70 to 100 proof (40 to 45% abv) after a single distillation.

== History ==
Tubâ, a variety of palm wine, existed in the Philippines before colonisation. They were widely consumed for recreation and important in various religious rituals. Heavy consumption of alcohol in the Philippine islands was described in several Spanish accounts. Social drinking (tagayan or inuman in Tagalog and Visayan languages) was and continues to be an important aspect of Filipino social interactions.

Laksoy is pre-colonial in origin. Despite being distilled, laksoy and lambanog were inaccurately called vino de nipa and vino de coco, respectively, in Spanish. In Historia de Las Islas E Indios de Bisayas (1668), the Spanish missionary Francisco Ignacio Alcina described "dalisay" as vino de la nipa, el primero que se extrae y más fuerte ("nipa wine, the first to be extracted and the strongest"). In the Vocabulario de la lengua Tagala, primera, y segunda parte (1794) by Domingo de los Santos, he defines dalisay as a type of alac that is muy fuerte y bueno ("very strong and good").

In Historia general sacro-profana, política y natural de las islas del poniente, llamadas Filipinas (1697-1755) by Juan José Delgado, native liquor is described as being distinguished into three types: vino ordinario (from the first distillate), dalisay (from the second distillate), and mistela (from the third distillate). In contrast to Alcina and other authors, Delgado applies the terms to both nipa and coconut liquor, distinguishing them as dalisay de nipa and dalisay de coco.

== Description ==
Tubâ has two main variants. The most common being the one made from coconut sap. It is distilled into lambanog. The second most common type of tubâ is made from nipa palm sap. Laksoy is derived from the sap. Like lambanog (made from coconut sap), it is particularly potent, having a typical alcohol content of 70 to 100 proof (40 to 45% abv) after a single distillation.

== Production ==
Laksoy is more difficult to produce than lambanog because the nipa palm must be covered in mud for six weeks to several months in advance. The mud is scraped off and the inflorescence is cut off. The sap which flows out of the cut branch is collected in attached bamboo containers (salhod or salod). The bamboo containers are collected every day and the inflorescence is sliced again by a few millimeters to renew the flow of the sap. The sweet sap is fermented in banga (earthen jars) to make tubâ, which is then distilled into laksoy.

== See also ==
- Bahalina
- Basi
- Kaong palm vinegar
- Mezcal
- Nipa palm vinegar
- Tapuy
