= Lambanog =

Traditional Filipino liquor

Lambanóg
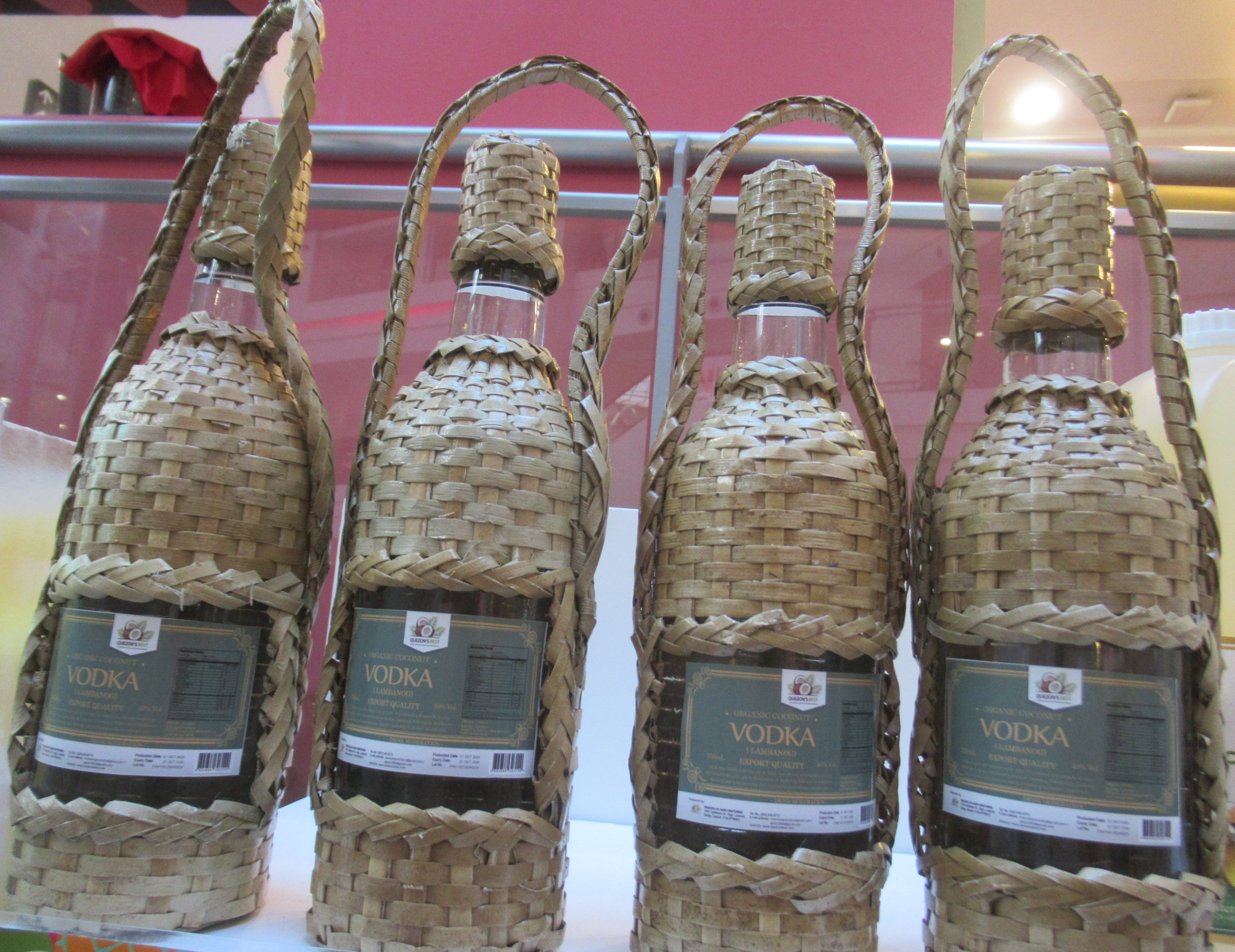
- Lambanog from Tiaong, Quezon
- Type: Palm liquor
- Other name(s): Coconut vodka, Philippine palm brandy, Vino de coco, Dalisay de coco
- Origin: The Philippines, Luzon, Visayas
- Alcohol by volume: 40–45%
- Ingredients: Palm nectar
- Related products: Laksoy, Tubâ

Lambanóg is a traditional Filipino distilled palm liquor. It is an alcoholic liquor made from the distillation of naturally fermented nectar (tubâ) from palm trees such as sugar palm, coconut, or nipa. The most popular variety is produced from the distilled coconut nectar which is commonly described as "coconut vodka" due to its clear to milky white color and high alcohol content. It originates from Luzon and the Visayas Islands (where it was historically known as dalisay de coco, among other names). During the Spanish colonial period, it was also known as vino de coco in Spanish (despite being distilled and thus not a wine). In the international market, it is commonly sold as "coconut vodka" or "palm brandy."

Lambanóg usually has a clear to milky white color. It has a final alcohol content of 40 to 45% abv, which is similar to whiskey or vodka. Lambanóg is used as a base liquor for various flavored spirits and cocktail creations. Its smoothness has been compared to that of Japanese sake and European schnapps.

== History ==
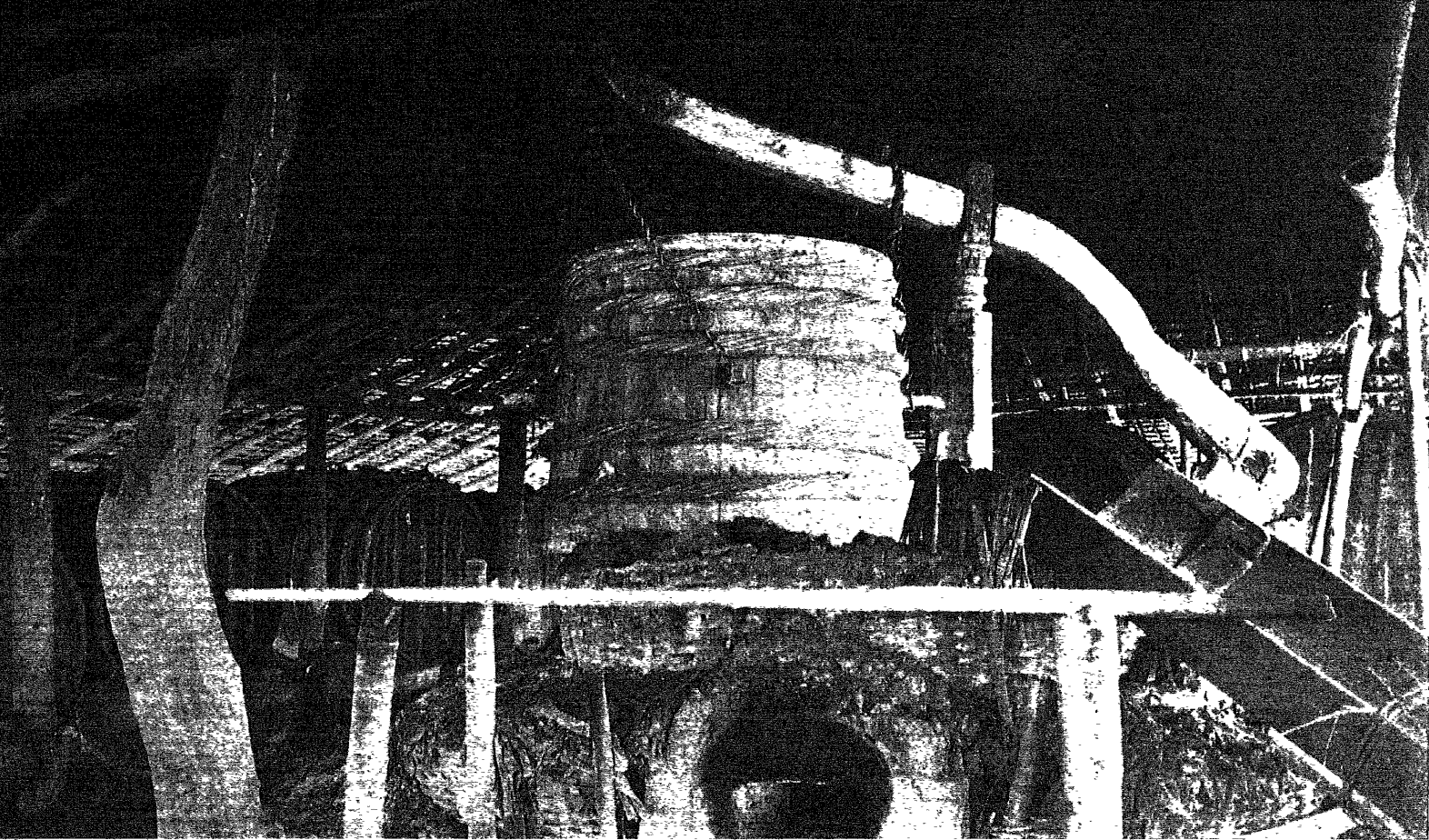
A kawa still for the production of lambanóg (c. 1912)

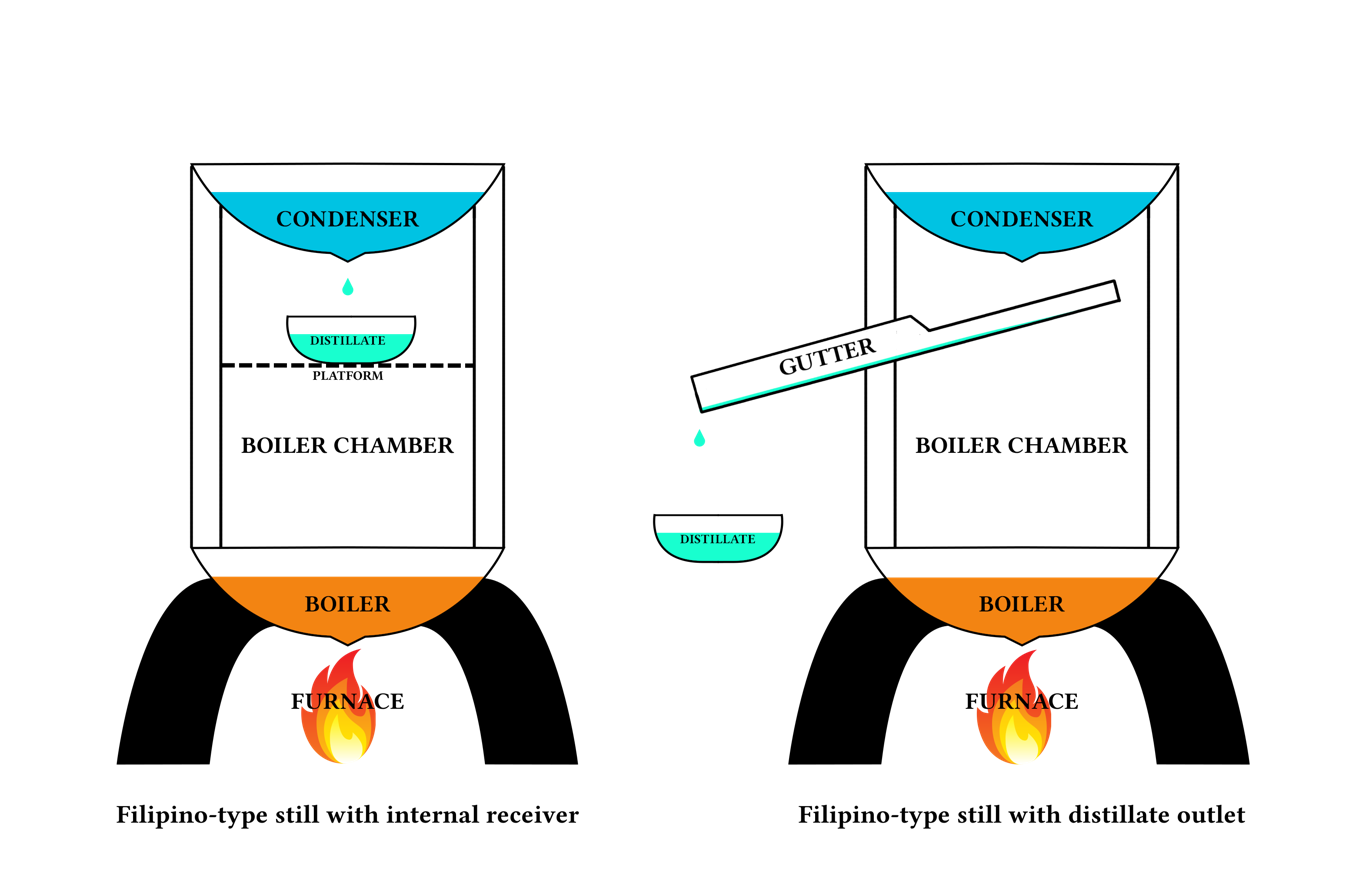
Generalized diagrams of Filipino-type stills

Tubâ, a kind of palm wine, existed in the Philippines before colonization. They were widely consumed for recreation and played an important role in various religious rituals. Heavy consumption of alcohol in the Philippine islands was described in several Spanish accounts. Social drinking (tagayan or inuman in Tagalog and Visayan languages) was and continues to be an important aspect of Filipino social interactions.

Tubâ could be further distilled in distinctive indigenous stills, resulting to the lambanóg, a palm liquor derived from tubâ. There were hundreds of local distilleries for lambanóg production, largely improvized. They varied from portable stills with around 20 L (0.020 m^{3}) capacity, to large stills which can process 750 L (0.75 m^{3}). They usually consist of two large pans (kawa or karaha), a hollowed out log, and a bamboo tube. One pan was filled with the tubâ and set on the fire. The hollowed out log was placed in between, acting as the walls of the still. The second pan was then placed on top of the wooden cylinder and constantly filled with cold water to induce condensation. A bamboo tube was attached to the wooden cylinder to collect the distillate to containers. Larger stills were barrel-like and made from planks reinforced with rattan hoops. The joints of the still were sealed with clay or rags. The entire upper part of the apparatus was usually connected to a lever that allowed them to be swung aside to refill or clean the lower pan.

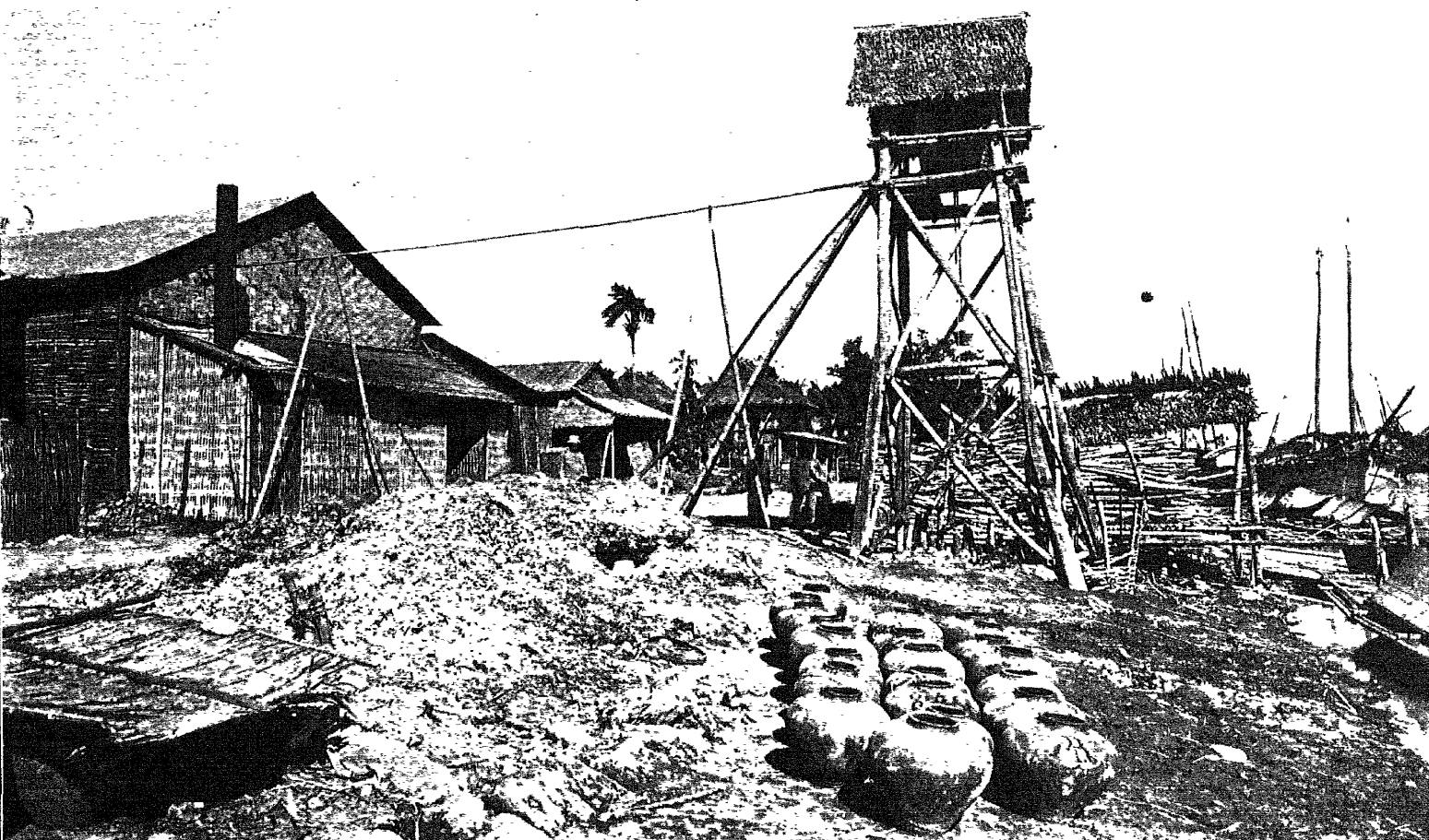
A distillery in Pangasinan (c. 1912)

The first historical mention of coconut liquor in the Philippines was in 1521, in Antonio Pigafetta's chronicles of the Magellan expedition. It was among the first gifts received by Ferdinand Magellan's crew from the natives of Suluan, after they anchored off the island of Homonhon (the first landfall of the expedition in the Philippine Islands). Pigafetta recorded its name as uraca.

During the Spanish colonial period of the Philippines, lambanog was inaccurately called vino de coco ("coconut wine"). From around 1569, it was introduced via Manila galleons to Nueva Galicia (present-day Colima, Jalisco, and Nayarit), Mexico by Filipino immigrants who established coconut planations. It quickly became highly popular in the region. It competed with the sales of imported spirits from Spain, leading Spanish colonial authorities and the Royal Audience in Spain to ban the production of vino de coco and issue an order for the destruction of coconut plantations. By the mid-1700s, vino de coco production in Mexico had ceased (though non-alcoholic variants of tubâ persisted). The prohibition of vino de coco and the introduced distillation technologies from the Philippines led to the development of mezcal and tequila by the indigenous peoples of Mexico.

"There are in Nueva España so many of those Indians who come from the Filipinas Islands who have engaged in making palm wine along the other seacoast, that of the South Sea, and which they make with stills, as in Filipinas, that it ill in time become a part reason for the natives of Nueva España, who now use the wine that comes from Castilla, to drink none except what the Filipinos make. For since the natives of Nueva España are a race inclined to drink and intoxication, and the wine made by the Filipinos is distilled and as strong as brandy, they crave it rather than the wine from España. ... so great is the traffic in this [palm wine] at present on the coast at Navidad, among the Apusabalcos, and throughout Colima, that they load beasts of burden with this wine in the same way as in España. By postponing the speedy remedy that this demands, the same thing might also happen to the vineyards of Piru. It can be averted, provided all the Indian natives of the said Filipinas Islands are shipped and returned to them, that the palm groves and vessels with which that wine is made be burnt, the palm-trees felled, and severe penalties imposed on whomever remains or returns to make that wine."

— Sebastian de Piñeda, letter to King Philip III of Spain (1619),

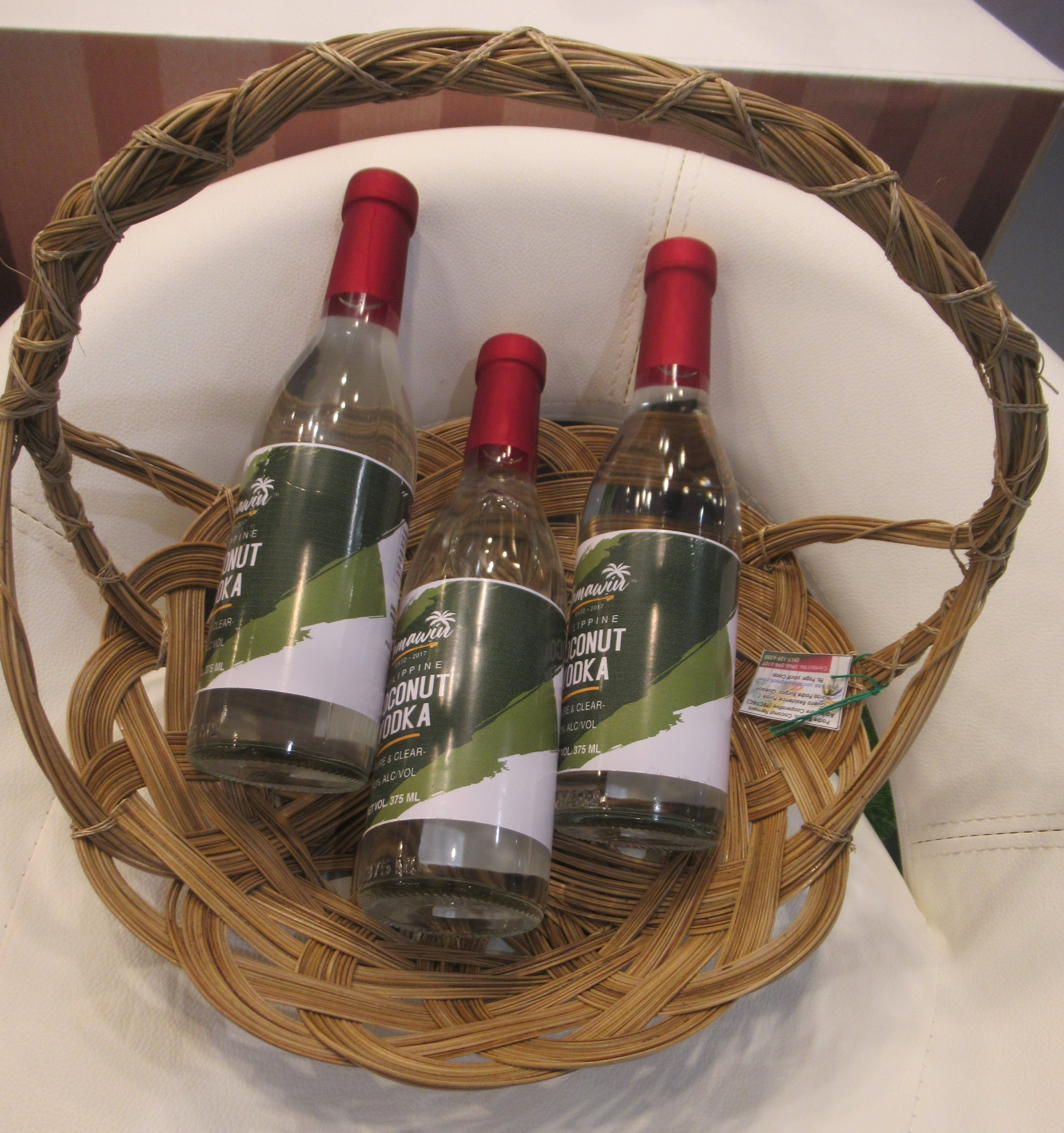
Lambanog is often sold as "coconut vodka"

During the American colonial period, the Food and Drugs Board of the Philippine Islands set up regulated distilleries for lambanóg with modern equipment. Home production of lambanóg was made illegal, as unregulated production can result in the retention of toxic levels of methanol due to improper procedures. They also standardized the trade name of lambanóg to "Philippine palm brandy" (also "Philippine coco palm brandy"). This was due to the fact that they were distilled (and thus not wines); as well as concerns about the local prejudice against "native drinks" (which are generally known as vino or bino) which could affect their marketability.

TasteAtlas in the "Top 79 Spirits in the World" March 15, 2024 list ranked Lambanog as No. 2 with 4.4 star rating from a possible 5. It described Lambanog "the clear, colorless, and strong Lambanog originating from the fermented nectar of coconut palm, with a usual alcohol content around 40% ABV."

== Description ==
Lambanóg has a very high alcohol content of 40%-45% abv (80 to 90 proof), in comparison to bahalina (10%-13% abv) and tubâ (2% - 4% abv). Lambanóg is usually served pure, though it can also be traditionally flavored with raisins. Modern lambanóg has recently been marketed in several flavors such as mango, blueberry, pineapple, bubblegum and cinnamon in an effort to appeal to all age groups.

== Production ==
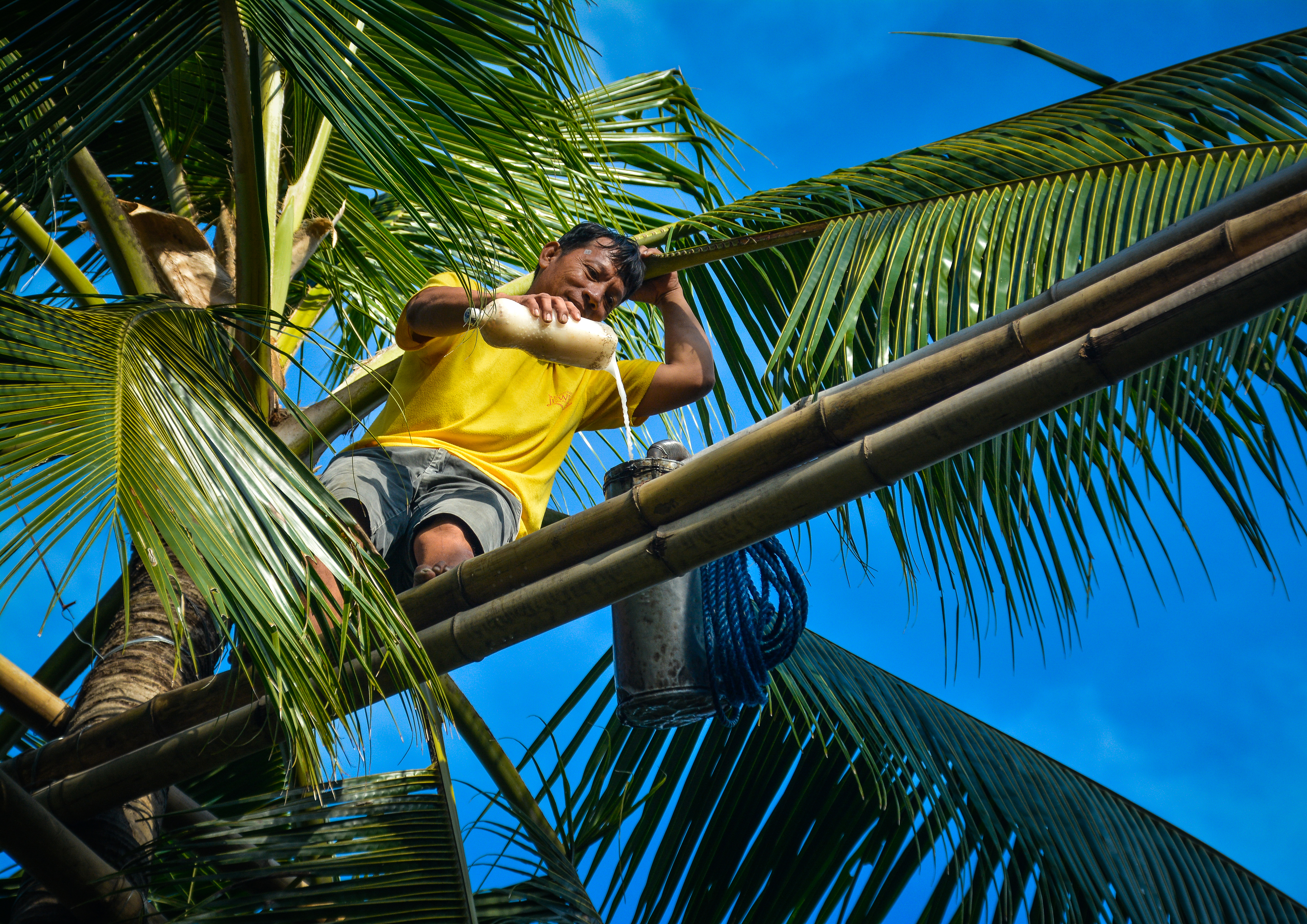
A worker in the Philippines collecting sweet coconut nectar from cut flower stalks for the production of lambanog

Lambanóg production was traditionally centered in the Southern Tagalog region. The current main producing areas are the provinces of Quezon, Laguna, and Batangas, where coconuts are a dominant agricultural crop. Not all lambanóg variants are from coconut. Lambanóg is also used as a generic term mostly in Southern Luzon, specifically in Quezon, for all alcoholic drinks from palm trees—whether they are from kaong, coconut, or nipa. Lambanóg distilled from nipa nectar is also locally known by other names such as nipanog or alak sa sasa. Most lambanóg producers are small-scale cottage industries with only around 4 to 25 employees. Quezon is the leading producer of lambanóg, hosting the three largest lambanóg distillers of the country: Mallari Distillery, Buncayo Distillery, and Capistrano Distillery. Lambanóg (as dalisay or dalisay de coco) was also produced in the Visayas Islands in the Spanish colonial period of the Philippines.

== Health concern ==
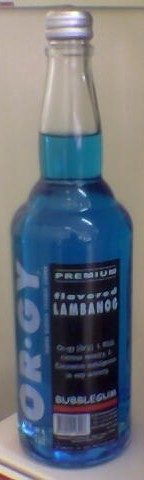
Bubblegum-flavored lambanog

Unregistered lambanóg production is illegal in the Philippines under regulations by the Food and Drug Administration and the Department of Agriculture. Consumers are warned to only purchase lambanóg that is properly sealed and made by companies registered with the FDA. Several deaths still occur each year from methanol poisoning after drinking lambanóg moonshine or adulterated lambanóg from retailers.

In December 2019, at least 11 people died and more than 300 were treated after drinking moonshine lambanog in Laguna and Quezon, two provinces south of Manila.

== See also ==
- Bahalina
- Basi
- Kaong palm vinegar
- Mezcal
- Nipa palm vinegar
- Tapuy
- Mead
