= Pangasi =

Various traditional Filipino rice wines

- Type: Rice wine
- Other name(s): Pangase, gasi
- Origin: The Philippines, Visayas, Mindanao
- Ingredients: Rice

Pangasi, also known as pangase or gasi, are various traditional Filipino rice wines from the Visayas Islands and Mindanao. They also may be made from other native cereals like millet and Job's tears. Pangasi and other native Filipino alcoholic beverages made from cereal grains have collectively been referred to by the Spanish as pitarrillos.

Aside from being consumed recreationally, pangasi figured prominently in the rituals of the babaylan shamans in various Filipino ethnic groups. Pangasi was mentioned by early Spanish explorers as being common in the Visayas, although it has largely disappeared throughout most of its range in modern times. It survives in some areas of Visayas and Mindanao. On Panay Island in the Western Visayas, pangasi is traditionally fermented with various leaves as well as sugarcane juice among the Suludnon people. It is very similar to the pangasi (also called agkud) of the Lumad peoples of Mindanao.

In the Zamboanga Peninsula, pangasi (more commonly spelled as "pangase") refers to three different kinds of wines among the Subanen people of the Zamboanga Peninsula. Traditional pangase is made either from rice or Job's tears (adlay) fermented with a starter culture (tapay) and typically spiced with ginger (in modern times, hot peppers are also used). It is fermented inside jars known as bandi or tibod for two weeks to three years. However, modern pangase are increasingly being made with cassava tubers, which were introduced by the Spanish to the Philippines.

== See also ==
- Bahalina
- Basi
- Kaong palm vinegar
- Nipa palm vinegar
- Tapuy
