= Tubâ =

Filipino alcoholic beverage

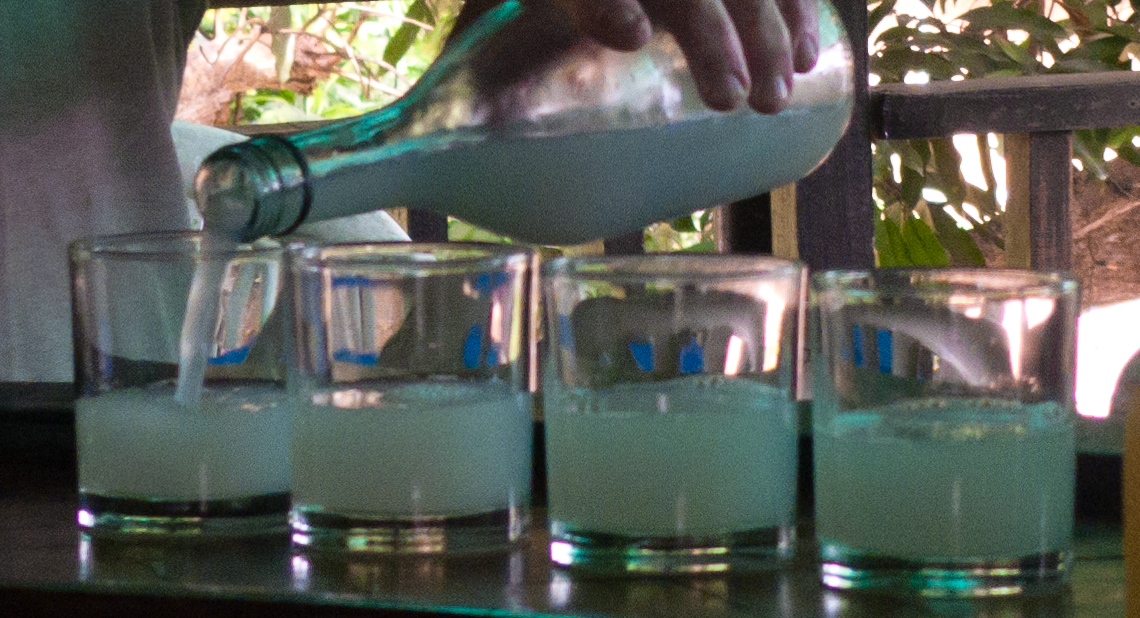
- Type: Palm wine
- Origin: The Philippines
- Alcohol by volume: 2%-4%

Tubâ (Tagalog pronunciation: [tʊˈbaʔ]) is a traditional Filipino palm wine made from the naturally fermented nectar of various species of palm trees. During the Spanish colonial period, tubâ was introduced to Guam, the Marianas, and Mexico via the Manila galleons. It remains popular in Mexico, especially in the states of Colima, Jalisco, Michoacán, Nayarit, and Guerrero. Tubâ was also introduced to the Torres Strait Islands of Australia in the mid-19th century by Filipino immigrant workers in the pearling industry.

== History ==
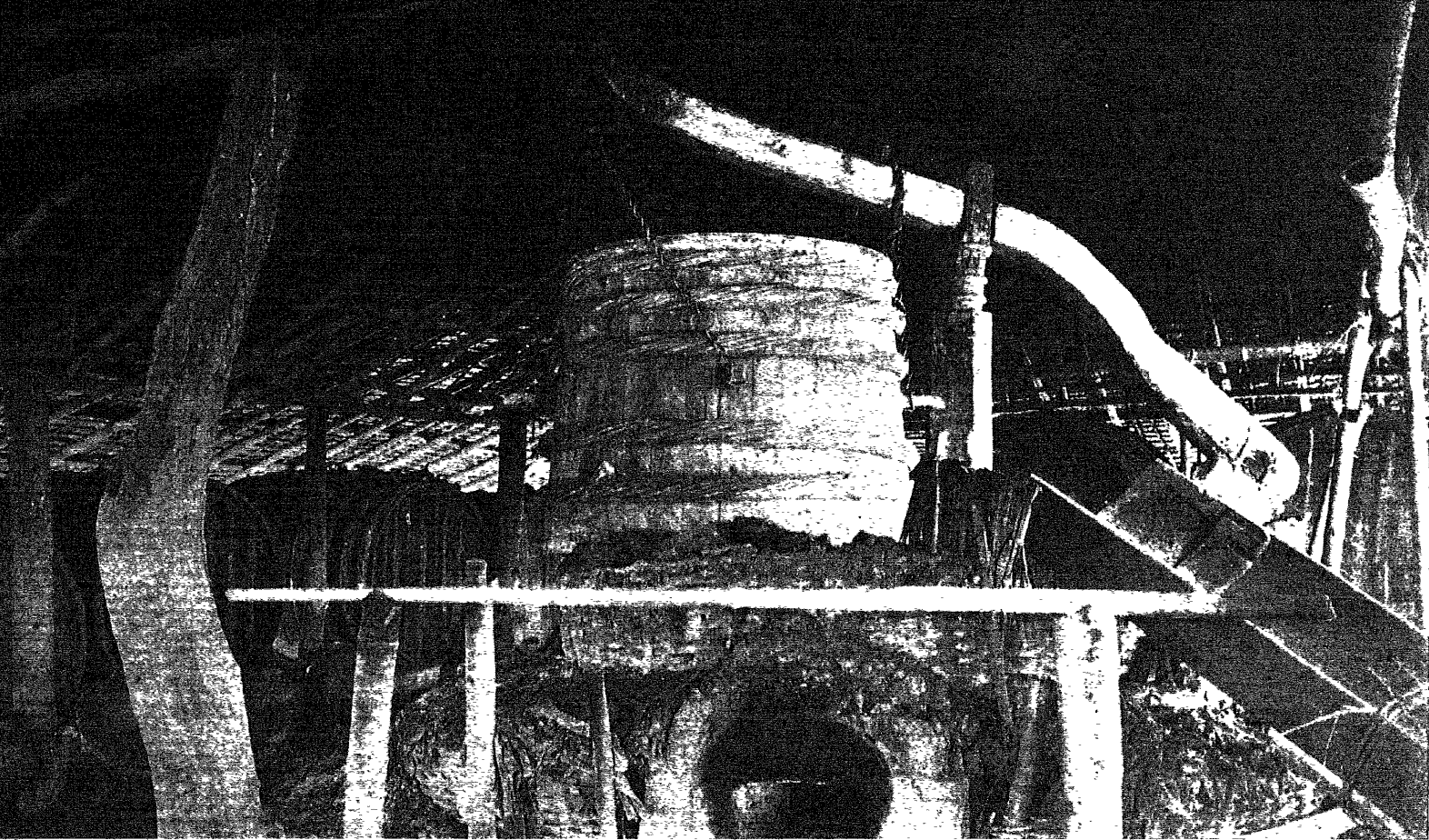
A kawà (cauldron) still for the production of lambanóg from tubâ (c. 1912)

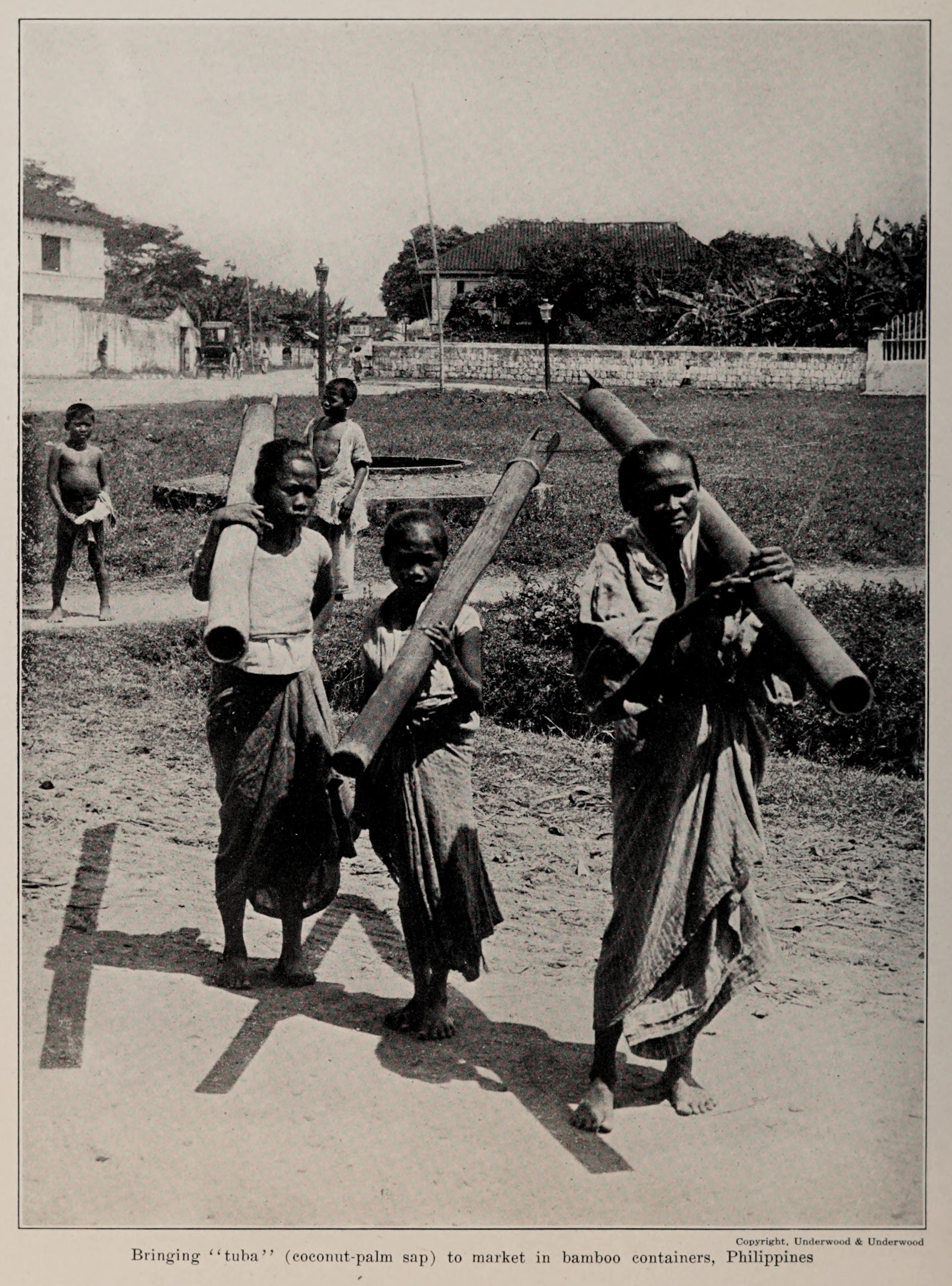
Bringing "tuba" (coconut-palm sap) to market in bamboo containers, Philippines, 1923

Tubâ has existed in the Philippines since pre-colonial times. It was widely consumed for recreation as well as having ritual significance in animist religious ceremonies performed by babaylan and other shamans. Heavy consumption of tubâ and other alcoholic beverages in the Philippines was reported by early Spanish colonizers. Social drinking (inuman or tagayán in Tagalog and Visayan languages) was and is an important aspect of Filipino cultural interfacing.

A peculiar yet nationwide drinking custom is sharing a single drinking vessel. During tagayán, one person (usually the owner of the beverage) becomes the tanggero who fills a cup with a serving of alcohol (a tagay). One of the group then drinks from the cup and passes it back to the tanggero for a refill. The tanggero fills the cup again and passes it to a different person, and so on until all have had a drink. A second method is to drink from the same container at the same time using drinking straws made from hollow reeds or bamboo. Tagayán is usually accompanied by a shared serving of food known as pulutan. The ritual and terminology of tagayán was recorded in the Bocabulario Tagalog (1630) by Fray Miguel Ruiz, and these social drinking practises remain largely unchanged today. Tagayán is also related to the ancient Filipino practice of sandugo (blood compact), as both reinforce camaraderie and social bonds among participants by drinking from the same vessel.

Tubâ was first recorded in European records by Antonio Pigafetta of the Magellan expedition (c. 1521), who called it uraca and mistakenly assumed that it was distilled.

"Cocoanuts are the fruit of the palmtree. Just as we have bread, wine, oil, and milk, so those people get everything from that tree. They get wine in the following manner. They bore a hole into the heart of the said palm at the top called palmito, from which distils a liquor which resembles a white must. That liquor is sweet but somewhat tart, and is gathered in canes of bamboo as thick as the leg and thicker. They fasten the bamboo to the tree at evening for the morning, and in the morning for the evening."

— Antonio Pigafetta, Il primo viaggio intorno al globo di Antonio Pigafetta e le sue regole sull'arte del navigare (1524-1525),

Tubâ could be further distilled using a distinctive type of still into a palm liquor known as lambanóg (palm spirit) and laksoy (nipa). During the Spanish colonial period of the Philippines, lambanog and laksoy were inaccurately called vino de coco ("coconut wine") and vino de nipa ("nipa wine"), respectively, despite them being distilled liquor. From around 1569, lambanog (as vino de coco) was introduced via the Manila galleons to Nueva Galicia (now Colima, Jalisco, and Nayarit) in modern Mexico by Filipino immigrants who established coconut plantations. It quickly became popular in the region, competing with the sales of imported spirits from Spain. This led colonial authorities and the Royal Audience in Spain to ban the production of vino de coco and decree the destruction of coconut plantations. By the mid-1700s, vino de coco production in Mexico had ceased (though non-alcoholic variants of tubâ persisted). The prohibition of vino de coco and the introduced distillation technologies from the Philippines led to the development of mezcal and tequila by the indigenous peoples of Mexico.

== Regional variations ==
=== Bahal ===
Bahal is a type of tubâ that is distinctively orange to brown in color because it has added extracts (barok) from the dried bark (marka tungog or tangal) of certain mangrove species (Ceriops tagal, Rhizophora mucronata, or Vateria indica). It is fermented for around a day to a few weeks. It is an intermediate stage in the production of bahalina wines. It originates from the Visayan regions of Visayas and Mindanao.

=== Kinutil ===
Kinutil is tubâ mixed with raw egg yolks, tabliya chocolate, milk, and other ingredients. It is widespread in the Visayan regions of Visayas and Mindanao and is also known as kinutir, kutir, or dubado, among other names.

=== Tuhak ===
Tuhak is a type of tubâ made from the nectar of kaong palm (Arenga pinnata), locally known as kaong or cabonegro. It originates from the Caraga region of Mindanao. It is collected and fermented in the same way as tubâ. However, extracts from the bark of a tree known as lamud may sometimes be added to aid in fermentation and to prevent the souring of the nectar. It is also known as hidikup or hidiup in Agusan del Norte and san in Agusan del Sur.

=== Tunggang ===
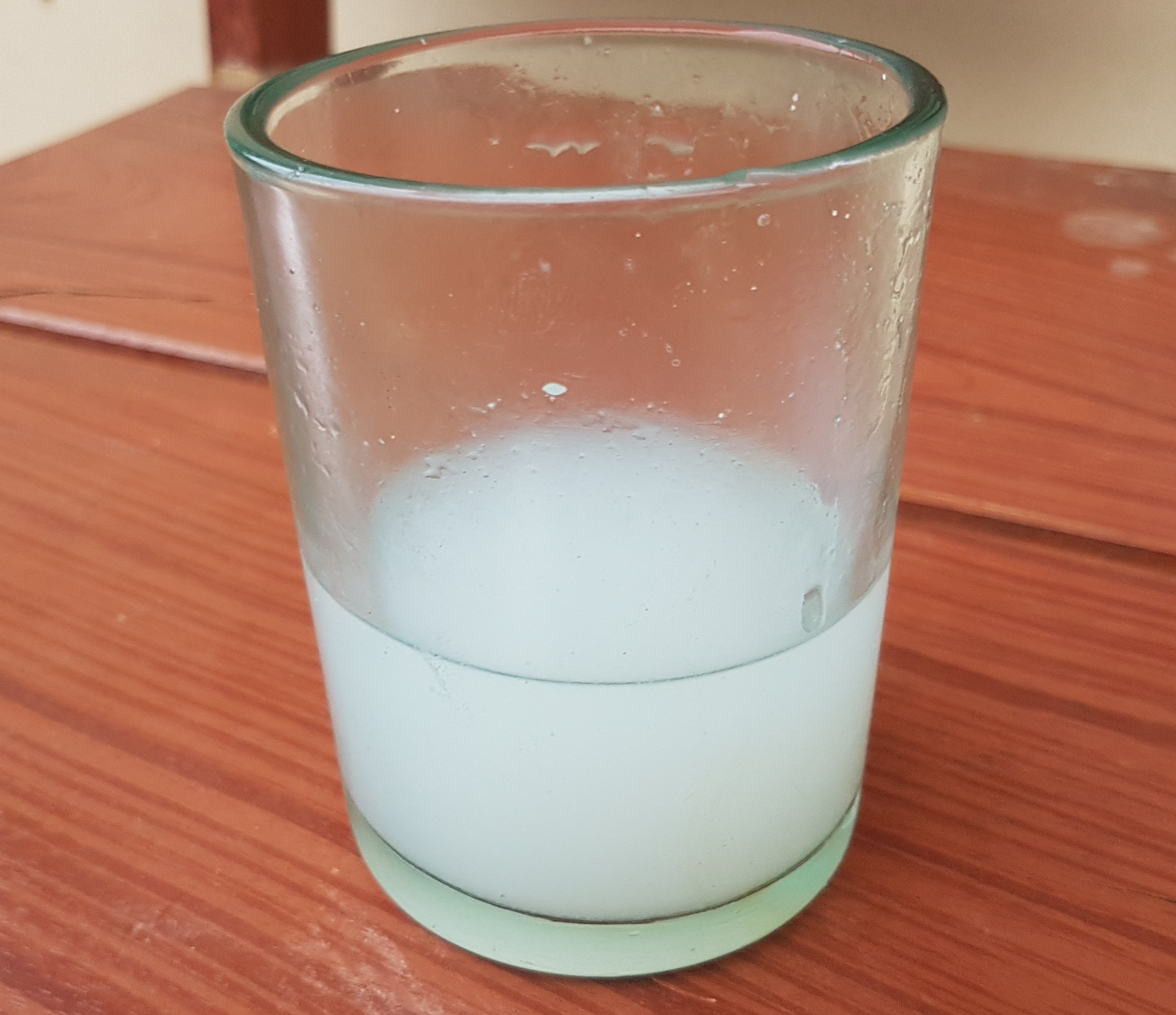
Fresh (unfermented) tunggang from Northern Mindanao

Tunggang is a type of tubâ made by the Manobo, Mandaya, and Mamanwa people from fishtail palm (Caryota spp.) nectar. It is not as popular as other varieties of tubâ because it has a relatively more unpleasant smell and taste.

== Outside of the Philippines ==
=== Mariana Islands ===
Tubâ production and coconut nectar harvesting were introduced to Guam and the Mariana Islands (then part of the Spanish East Indies) by Filipino settlers. Their initial introduction is usually attributed to the Filipino assistants of the Spanish missionary Diego Luis de San Vitores in 1668. Tubâ quickly became a fixture of the culture in the islands, which previously had no native alcoholic drink. The Chamorro people developed two derivatives from tubâ: aguajente (also aguayente or agi, from Spanish aguardiente), a distilled liquor similar to Filipino lambanóg; and almibad, a sweet syrup made from boiled coconut nectar used in making candies and rice cakes (potu). Tubâ itself was either consumed fresh (non-alcoholic) or fermented; with the former popular to women and children, and the latter popular to men.

Soon after the acquisition of Guam by the United States from Spain in 1899, aguajente was banned by the American government. Anyone caught making it would get a prison sentence and a fine. The ban remained in place for the next 40 years, restricting tubâ only to the non-alcoholic and mildly alcoholic versions. In 1939, shortly before the outbreak of World War II, taxes were also levied on tubâ-producing coconut palms, further crippling the industry. Today, tubâ is rare in the islands and its production is in decline.

=== Mexico ===
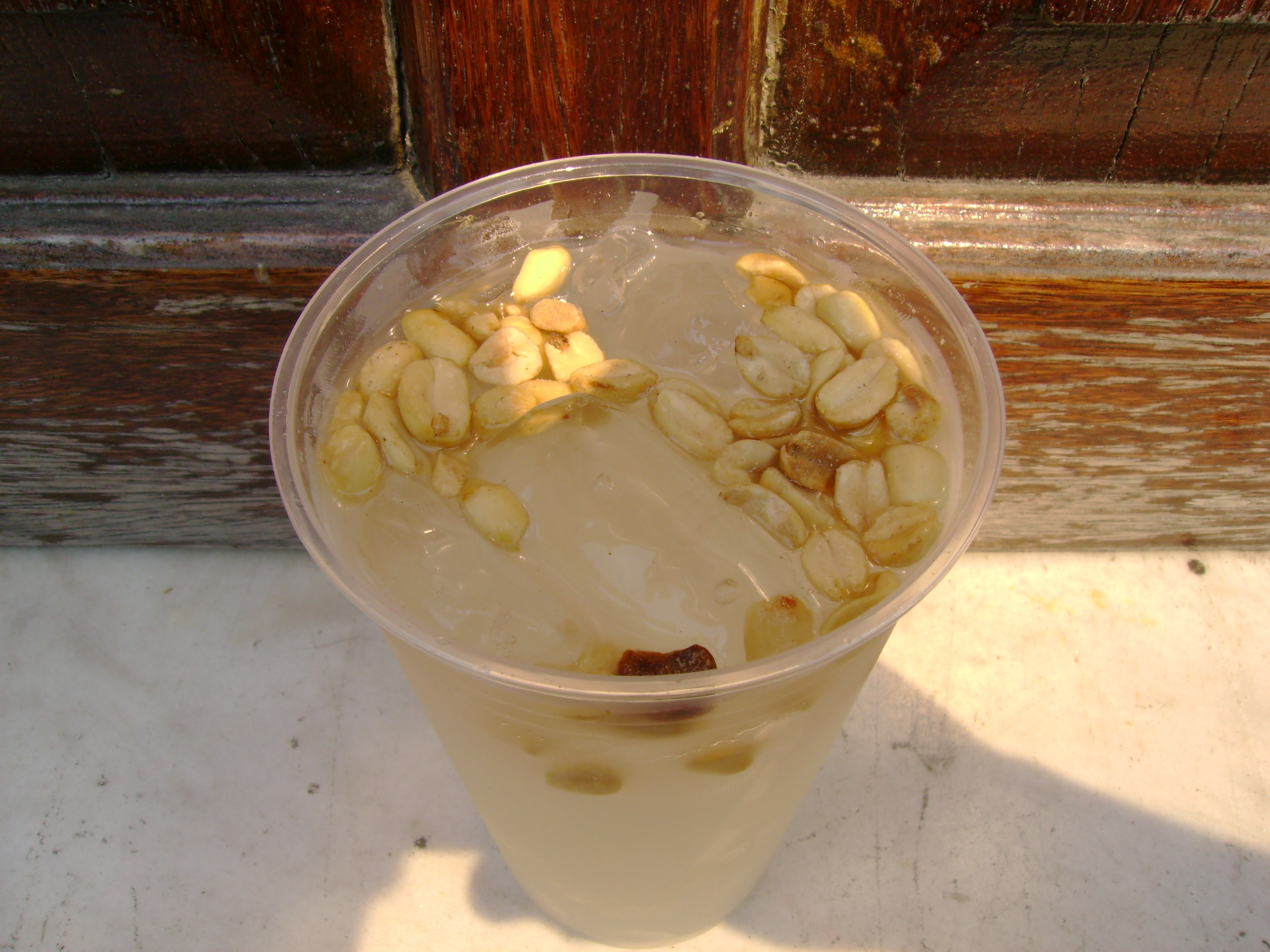
Tuba fresca from Colima, Mexico; a non-alcoholic drink made from coconut sap derived from Philippine tubâ

Tubâ, along with coconuts (which are not native to the Americas), was introduced to Mexico in the 16th to 17th centuries via the Manila Galleons to Acapulco. It remains popular in Western Mexico where it is known as tuba, particularly in the states of Colima, Jalisco, Michoacán, and Guerrero. Mexican tuba is made in the same way as Filipino tubâ. The traditional nectar collectors are known as tuberos (which also means "plumber" in both Mexico and the Philippines). They were also distilled into vino de coco (lambanog), which became so popular that in 1619, Captain Sebastian de Piñeda wrote to King Philip III of Spain complaining of the Filipino "Indio" settlers in Nueva España who were causing significant loss of profits to Iberian alcohol exporters due to tuba. The distinctive Filipino-type stills used by tuba farmers were adopted by the indigenous peoples of Mexico for the distillation of other alcoholic drinks. The most notable of which is mezcal and sotol, the fermented juice of both drinks prior to distillation is still called tuba.

"There are in New Spain so many of those Indians who come from the Philippine Islands who have engaged in making palm wine along the other sea coast, that of the South Sea, and which they make with stills, as in the Philippines, that it will in time become a part reason for the natives of New Spain, who now use the wine that comes from Castile, to drink none except what the Filipinos make. For since the natives of New Spain are a racially inclined to drink and intoxication, and the wine made by the Filipinos is distilled and as strong as brandy, they crave it rather than the wine from Spain. ...so great is the traffic in this [palm wine] at present on the coast at Navidad, among the Apusabalcos, and throughout Colima, that they load beasts of burden with this wine in the same way as in Spain. By postponing the speedy remedy that this demands, the same thing might also happen to the vineyards of Piru. It can be averted, provided all the Indian natives of the said Philippine Islands are shipped and returned to them, that the palm groves and vessels with which that wine is made be burnt, the palm-trees felled, and severe penalties imposed on whomever remains or returns to make that wine."

— Sebastian de Piñeda (1619),

Mexican tuba is also commonly sold as tuba fresca, a non-alcoholic version made from fresh coconut nectar. Tuba fresca is traditionally sold by street vendors in large bottle gourds mixed with coconut milk, ice, and sugar. It is usually topped with walnuts and diced fruit. Colimense tuba compuesta is pinkish flavoured with pomegranate or beet juice.

=== Torres Strait Islands ===
In the mid-19th century, Filipino immigrant workers settled in the Torres Strait Islands in Australia to work in the pearling industry as divers and overseers. They settled in sizable communities in Horn Island, Thursday Island, and Hammond Island, numbering at around 500 by 1884. Despite Australian anti-miscegenation laws and the general racism of the Australian government at the time, many Filipinos intermarried with the native Torres Strait Islanders. They also transmitted various Filipino traditions and material culture to the natives, including stories, songs, recipes, various crop plants, and new technologies.

One of these technologies was the method of producing tubâ. The Islanders, who previously had no tradition of alcohol production or consumption, quickly adopted the tubâ and all its various uses. They consumed coconut nectar fresh as a non-alcoholic beverage or as a dip for mangoes; they fermented it into tubâ proper which they also called tuba; they used it as yeast to make bread rise; and they distilled it into liquor which they referred to as "steamed tuba." Even though Australian government prohibitions existed from 1837 to the 1960s banning the sale and consumption of alcohol to Indigenous Australians, it failed to stop the popularity of tuba.

After the introduction of even more restrictive race-based laws in 1901 and the collapse of the pearl and shell market, most Filipinos started leaving Australia and returning to the Philippines. By 1912, almost all of the Filipino population was gone, along with the pearling industry, leaving only the families who intermarried with the locals and their descendants. The tradition of tuba production, however, remained. During World War II, tuba was sold by the Islanders to American servicemen stationed in the Strait who were also familiar with tuba. Tuba is still an important part of Torres Strait Islander culture today.

== See also ==
- Bahalina
- Basi
- Coconut sugar
- Kaong palm vinegar
- Lambanog
- Mezcal
- Nipa palm vinegar
- Tapuy
