= Alcohol by volume =

Measure of how much alcohol is in a liquid

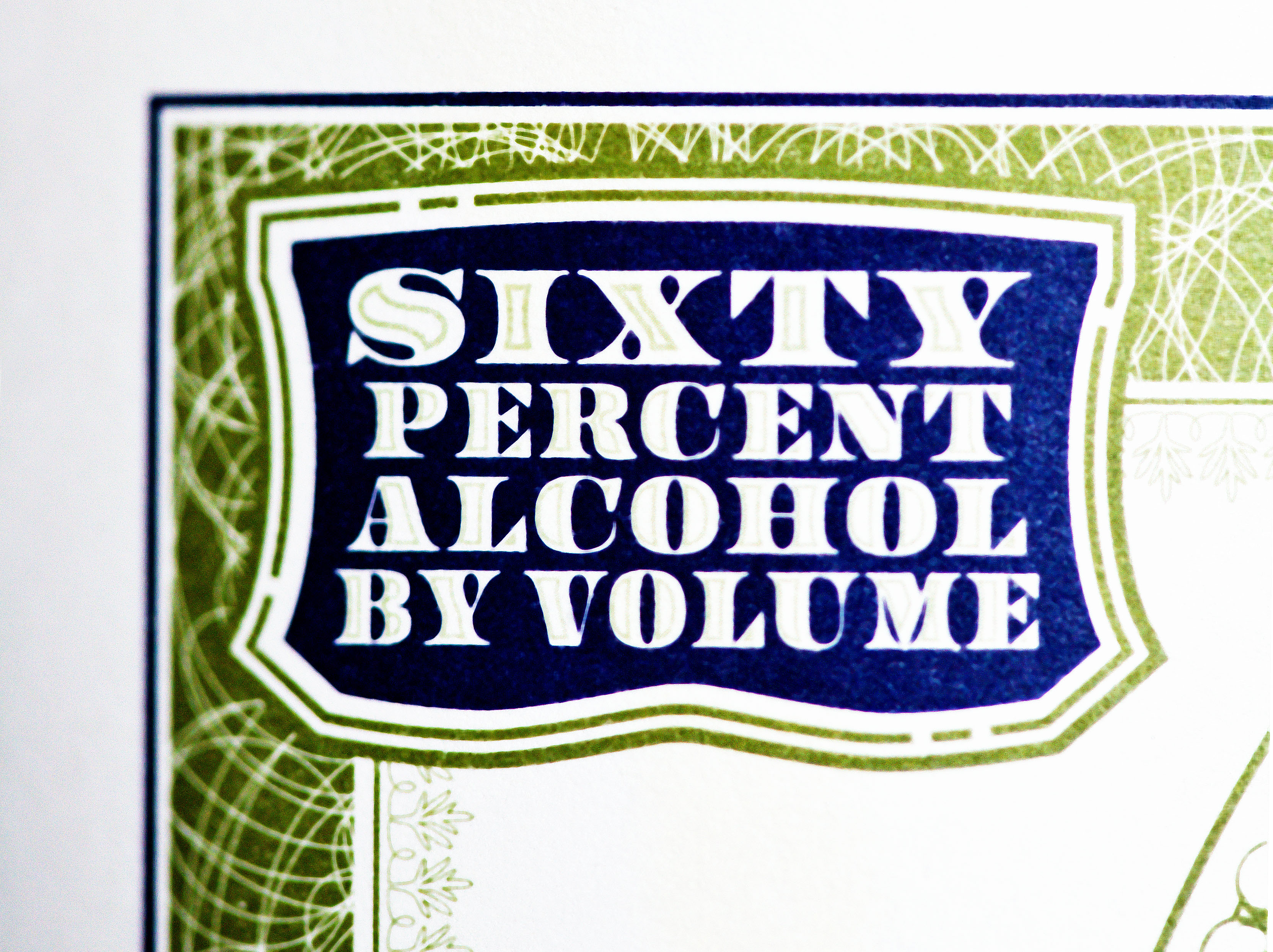
The alcohol by volume shown on a bottle of absinthe

Alcohol by volume (abbreviated as alc/vol or ABV) is a common measure of the amount of alcohol contained in a given alcoholic beverage. It is a dimensionless quantity, often expressed in percent, defined as the volume concentration of ethanol mixed in the liquid, i.e., the ratio of volume of ethanol to the volume of the solution, both at 20 °C (68 °F). (Note: Pure ethanol is lighter than water, with a density of 0.78945 g/mL (0.82353 oz/US fl oz; 0.79122 oz/imp fl oz; 0.45633 oz/cu in).) The International Organization of Legal Metrology has tables of density of water–ethanol mixtures at different concentrations and temperatures.

In some countries, e.g. France, alcohol by volume is often referred to as degrees Gay-Lussac (after the French chemist Joseph Louis Gay-Lussac), although there is a slight difference since the Gay-Lussac convention uses the International Standard Atmosphere value for temperature, 15 °C (59 °F).

== Volume change ==
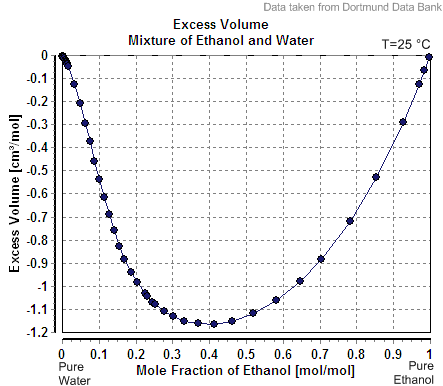
Change in volume with increasing alc/vol.

Mixing two solutions of alcohol of different strengths usually causes a change in volume. Mixing pure water with a solution less than 24% by mass causes a slight increase in total volume, whereas the mixing of two solutions above 24% causes a decrease in volume. (Note: See data in the CRC Handbook of Chemistry and Physics, 49th edition, pp. D-151 and D-152. Mixing a solution above 24% with a solution below 24% may cause an increase or a decrease, depending on the details.) The phenomenon of volume changes due to mixing dissimilar solutions is called "partial molar volume". Water and ethanol are both polar solvents. When water is added to ethanol, the smaller water molecules are attracted to the ethanol's hydroxyl group, and each molecule alters the polarity field of the other. The attraction allows closer spacing between molecules than is usually found in non-polar mixtures.

Thus, alc/vol is not the same as volume fraction expressed as a percentage. Volume fraction, which is widely used in chemistry (commonly denoted as v/v), is defined as the volume of a particular component divided by the sum of all components in the mixture when they are measured separately. For example, to make 100 mL of 50% alc/vol ethanol solution, water would be added to 50 mL of ethanol to make up exactly 100 mL. Whereas to make a 50% v/v ethanol solution, 50 mL of ethanol and 50 mL of water could be mixed but the resulting volume of solution will measure less than 100 mL due to the change of volume on mixing, and will contain a higher concentration of ethanol. The difference is not large, with the maximum difference being less than 2.5%, and less than 0.5% difference for concentrations under 20%.

== Threshold levels ==
=== Legal thresholds ===
Some drinks have requirements of alcoholic content in order to be certified as a certain alcohol brand or label. For example, in the United Kingdom, the United States, Canada and European Union whisky is legally required to be no less than 40% ABV bottled.

Low-alcohol beers (<0.5) are considered in some countries such as Iran as permitted (halal) despite alcohol being banned. However, the level of alcohol-free beers is typically the lowest commercially sold 0.05.

=== Biological thresholds ===
It is near impossible for a healthy person to become intoxicated drinking low-alcohol drinks. The low concentration severely limits the rate of intake, which is easily dispatched by human metabolism. Quickly drinking 1.5 L of 0.4% alc/vol beer in an hour resulted in a maximum of 0.0056% BAC in a study of German volunteers. Healthy human kidneys can only excrete 0.8–1.0 L of water per hour, making water intoxication likely to set in before any alcoholic intoxication.

The process of ethanol fermentation will slow down and eventually come to a halt as the alcohol produced becomes too concentrated for the yeast to tolerate, defining an upper limit of alc/vol for non-distilled alcoholic drinks. The typical tolerance for beer yeasts is at 8–12%, while wine yeasts typically range from 14–18%, with speciality ones reaching 20% alc/vol. Any higher would require distillation, producing liquor.

== Typical levels ==
Details about typical amounts of alcohol contained in various beverages can be found in the articles about them.

Drink	Typical alc/vol	Lowest	Highest
Fruit juice (naturally occurring)	0–0.11% They qualify as alcohol-free drinks in most countries. (most juices do not have alcohol but orange or grape [the highest here] may have some from early fermentation)	0.00	0.11
Low-alcohol beer	0.05–1.2% (usually not considered as alcohol legally) Under 2.5% in Finland, and 2.25% in Sweden, however.	0.05	1.20
Kvass	0.05–1.5%	0.05	1.50
Kefir	0.2–2.0%	0.20	2.00
Sobia	0.2–6.8%	0.20	6.80
Kombucha	0.5–1.5%	0.50	1.50
Kumis	0.7–4.5% (usually 0.7–2.5%)	0.70	4.50
Boza	1.0%	1.00	1.00
Chicha	1.0–11% (usually 1–6%)	1.00	11.00
Tubâ	2.0–4.0%	2.00	4.00
Chūhai	3.0–12.0% (usually 3–8%)	3.00	12.00
Pulque	2.0–7.0% (usually 4–6%)	2.00	7.00
Beer	(usually 4–6%)	2.00	10.00
Cider	(usually 4–8%)	4.00	8.00
Palm wine	4.0–6.0%	4.00	6.00
Alcopops	4.0–17.5%	4.00	17.50
Malt liquor	5.0-9.0%	5.00	9.00
Hard seltzer	5.0%	5.00	5.00
Four Loko	6–14%	6.00	14.00
Makgeolli	6.5–7%	6.50	7.00
Kuchikamizake	7%	7.00	7.00
Barley wine (strong ale)	8–15%	8.00	15.00
Mead	8–16%	8.00	16.00
Wine	5.5–16% (most often 12.5–14.5%)	5.50	16.00
Bahalina	10–13%	10.00	13.00
Basi	10–16%	10.00	16.00
Bignay wine	12–13%	12.00	13.00
Duhat wine	12–13%	12.00	13.00
Tapuy	14–19%	14.00	19.00
Kilju	15–17%	15.00	17.00
Dessert wine	14–25%	14.00	25.00
Sake	15% (or 18–20% if not diluted prior to bottling)	15.00	20.00
Liqueurs	15–55%	15.00	55.00
Fortified wine	15.5–20% (in the European Union, 15–22%)	15.50	22.00
Soju	14–45% (usually 17%)	14.00	45.00
Rice wine	18–25%	18.00	25.00
Punsch	20–30% (usually 25%)	20.00	30.00
Shochu	25–45% (usually 25%)	25.00	45.00
Awamori	25–60% (usually 30%)	25.00	60.00
Rượu đế	27–45% (usually 35% – except Ruou tam – 40–45%)	27.00	45.00
Bitters	28–45%	28.00	45.00
Applejack	30–40%	30.00	40.00
Pisco	30–48%	30.00	48.00
Țuică (Romanian drink)	30–65% (usually 35–55%)	30.00	65.00
Mezcal, Tequila	32–60% (usually 40%)	32.00	60.00
Vodka	35–95% (usually 40%, minimum of 37.5% in the European Union)	35.00	95.00
Rum	37.5–80% (usually 40%)	37.50	80.00
Brandy	35–60% (usually 40%)	35.00	60.00
Grappa	37.5–60%	37.50	60.00
Ouzo	37.5%	37.50	37.50
Aquavit	37.5–40%	37.50	40.00
Gin	37.5–50%	37.50	50.00
Pálinka	37.5–86% (usually 52%)	37.50	86.00
Cachaça	38–48%	38.00	48.00
Sotol	38–60%	38.00	60.00
Stroh	38–80%	38.00	80.00
Fernet	39–45%	39.00	45.00
Feni (liquor)	40–42.5%	40.00	42.50
Lambanog	40–45%	40.00	45.00
Nalewka	40–45%	40.00	45.00
Tsipouro	40–45%	40.00	45.00
Rakı	40–50%	40.00	50.00
Scotch whisky	40–70+%	40.00	70.00+
Whisky	40–70+% (usually 40%, 43% or 46%)	40.00	70.00+
Baijiu	40–65%	40.00	65.00
Chacha	40–70%	40.00	70.00
Bourbon whiskey	min 40% bottled	40.00	80.00
Rakija (Central/Southeast European drink)	40–86%	40.00	86.00
Maotai	43–53%	43.00	53.00
Absinthe	45–89.9%	45.00	89.90
Arak	60–65%	60.00	65.00
Oghi	60–75%	60.00	75.00
Poitín	60–95%	60.00	95.00
Centerbe (herb liqueur)	70%	70.00	70.00
Neutral grain spirit	85–95%	85.00	95.00
Cocoroco	93–96%	93.00	96.00
Rectified spirit	95% up to a practical limit of 97.2%	95.00	97.20

== Practical estimation of alcohol content ==
During the production of wine and beer, yeast is added to a sugary solution. During fermentation, the yeasts consume the sugars and produce alcohol. The density of sugar in water is greater than the density of alcohol in water. A hydrometer is used to measure the change in specific gravity (SG) of the solution before and after fermentation. The volume of alcohol in the solution can then be estimated. There are a number of empirical formulae which brewers and winemakers use to estimate the alcohol content of the liquor made.

Specific gravity is the density of a liquid relative to that of water, i.e., if the density of the liquid is 1.05 times that of water, it has a specific gravity of 1.05. In UK brewing usage, it is customary to regard the reference value for water to be 1000, so the specific gravity of the same example beer would be quoted as 1050. The formulas here assume that the former definition is used for specific gravity.

=== General ===
During ethanol fermentation the yeast converts one mole of sugar into two moles of alcohol. A general formula for calculating the resulting alcohol concentration by volume can be written:

$$ABV = SBV fermented \times GECF$$

where SBV fermented is sugar by volume (g/dL) converted to alcohol during fermentation and GECF is the glucose-ethanol conversion factor:

$$GECF = \frac{2 \times 46.069}{180.156} \approx 0.511435$$

where 46.069 is the molar mass of ethanol and 180.156 is the molar mass of glucose and fructose.

$$ABV \approx SBV fermented \times 0.511435$$
$$SBV fermented = SBV start - SBV final$$

Sugar by volume can be calculated from Brix (sugar by weight) and SG (relative density):

$$SBV = Brix \times SG$$

SG can be measured using an hydrometer and Brix can be calculated from SG. A simple formula for calculating Brix from SG is (SG 1.000 - 1.179):

$$Brix = 263.663 - \frac{263.806}{SG}$$

By substituting Brix in the SBV formula above, we get a formula for calculating SBV from SG only:

$$\text{SBV} = 263.663 \times SG - 263.806$$

By further substitution, we get a formula for calculating ABV from SG only:

$$SG drop = SG start - SG final$$
$$SBV fermented = 263.663 \times SG drop$$
$$ABV \approx 263.663 \times 0.511435 \times SG drop \approx 135 \times SG drop$$

SG drop is how much the SG decreased during fermentation (at 20 degree C). The factor 135 is most accurate in the center of the SG drop range of 0.000 to 0.179. Since the correlation of SG and Brix is non-linear it is common to divide the range to increase accuracy when using the simple ABV formula:

$$ABV \approx factor \times SG drop$$

SG drop	ABV	Factor
0.000 - 0.038	0 - 5	133
0.038 - 0.075	5 - 10	134
0.075 - 0.112	10 - 15	135
0.112 - 0.148	15 - 20	136
0.148 - 0.179	20 - 24	137

Example ABV calculation:

- SG measured at start of fermentation 1.067
- SG measured at end of fermentation 1.007
- SG drop = 1.067 - 1.007 = 0.06
- Factor from table above 134
- ABV = 134 x 0.06 = 8.04

=== Carbon dioxide compensation ===
One mole of glucose is converted to two moles of ethanol and two moles of carbon dioxide.

Ethanol fraction:

$$ef = \frac{2 \times 46.069}{180.156} = 0.511435$$

Carbon dioxide fraction:

$$cf = 1 - ef$$

Glucose w/w:

$$gww = \frac{brix}{100}$$

The carbon dioxide gas escapes the solution and lowers the total weight:

Ethanol w/w:

$$eww = \frac{ef \times gww}{1 - cf \times gww}$$

$$eww = \frac{ef \times \frac{brix}{100}}{1 - (1-ef) \times \frac{brix}{100}}$$

$$eww = \frac{1.04681 \times brix}{204.681 - brix}$$

Ethanol w/w percent:

$$ABW = \frac{104.681 \times brix}{204.681 - brix}$$

Specific Gravity:

$$SG$$

Ethanol density:

$$0.78945$$

Ethanol v/v:

$$evv = eww \times \frac{SG}{0.78945}$$

$$evv = \frac{1.04681 \times brix}{204.681 - brix} \times \frac{SG}{0.78945}$$

$$evv = \frac{1.326 \times brix \times SG}{204.681 - brix}$$

Ethanol v/v percent:

$$ABV = \frac{132.6 \times brix \times SG}{204.681 - brix}$$

With practical yield coefficient c (0.85 - 0.95), compensating for biomass, glycerol and incomplete conversion:

$$ABV = \frac{132.6 \times c \times brix \times SG}{204.681 - brix}$$

Using a common coefficient of c = 0.9

$$ABV = \frac{119.34 \times brix \times SG}{204.681 - brix}$$

The brix in the formulas above is the amount of sugar fermented, the current or final/total drop in sugar percentage (brix = starting brix - current brix). The SG is the current Specific Gravity.

=== Balling empirical formula ===
Advanced formula derived from Carl Balling empirical formulas. The formula compensates for changes in SG with changes in alcohol concentration and for the fact that not all sugar is converted into alcohol. All values are measured at 20 degree C.

$$ABV = \frac{-118772 \times \text{SG final} \times (\text{Plato start} - \text{Plato final})}{(\text{Plato start} - 193.765) \times (\text{Plato start} + 1220)}$$

where SG final is the specific gravity when fermentation ends, Plato start is the sugar by weight when fermentation begins, Plato final is the sugar by weight when fermentation ends. Brix can be used instead of Plato as they are nearly identical.

=== Wine ===
The simplest method for wine has been described by English author Cyril Berry:

$$\text{ABV} \approx 136 \times \left( \text{Starting SG} - \text{Final SG} \right)$$

=== Beer ===
One calculation for beer is:

$$\text{ABV} \approx 131 \times \left( \text{Starting SG} - \text{Final SG} \right)$$

For higher ABV above 6% many brewers use this formula:

$$\text{ABV} \approx \frac{105}{0.79} \times \left( \frac{\text{Starting SG} - \text{Final SG}}{\text{Final SG}} \right) \approx 132.9 \times \left( \frac{\text{Starting SG} - \text{Final SG}}{\text{Final SG}} \right)$$

== Other methods of specifying alcohol content ==
=== Alcohol proof ===
Another way of specifying the amount of alcohol content is alcohol proof, which in the United States is twice the alcohol-by-volume (alc/vol) number. This may lead to confusion over similar products bought in varying regions that have different names on country-specific labels. For example, Stroh rum that is 80% ABV is advertised and labeled as Stroh 80 when sold in Europe, but is named Stroh 160 when sold in the United States.

In the United Kingdom, proof is 1.75 times the number (expressed as a percentage). For example, 40% alc/vol is 80 proof in the US and 70 proof in the UK. However, since 1980, alcohol proof in the UK has been replaced by alc/vol as a measure of alcohol content, avoiding confusion between the UK and US proof standards.

=== Alcohol by weight ===
In the United States, Arkansas, Kansas, Mississippi, South Carolina, and Tennessee regulate and tax alcoholic beverages according to alcohol by weight (ABW), expressed as a percentage of total mass. The alc/vol value of a beverage is always higher than the ABW.

Because ABW measures the proportion of the drink's mass which is alcohol, while alc/vol is the proportion of the drink's volume which is alcohol, the two values are in the same proportion as the drink's density is with the density of alcohol. Therefore, one can use the following equation to convert between ABV and ABW:

$$\text{ABV} = \text{ABW} \times \frac{\text{density of beverage}}{\text{density of alcohol}}$$

At relatively low alc/vol, the alcohol percentage by weight is about 4/5 of the alc/vol (e.g., 3.2% ABW is about 4% alc/vol). However, because of the miscibility of alcohol and water, the conversion factor is not constant but rather depends upon the concentration of alcohol.

== See also ==
- Apparent molar property
- Excess molar quantity
- Standard drink
- Unit of alcohol
- Volume fraction

== Bibliography ==
- Hehner, Otto (1880). Alcohol Tables: giving for all specific gravities, from 1.0000 to 0.7938, the percentages of absolute alcohol, by weight and volume. London: J & A Churchill. ASIN B0008B5HOU.
- Berry, C. J. J. (1998). First Steps in Winemaking. Nexus Special Interests. ISBN 978-1-85486-139-9.
- Regan, Gary (2003). The Joy of Mixology. Clarkson Potter. ISBN 978-0-609-60884-5.
- Robinson, Jancis (2006). The Oxford Companion to Wine (3rd ed.). Oxford: OUP. ISBN 978-0-19-860990-2.
