= Nipa palm vinegar =

Traditional Filipino vinegar

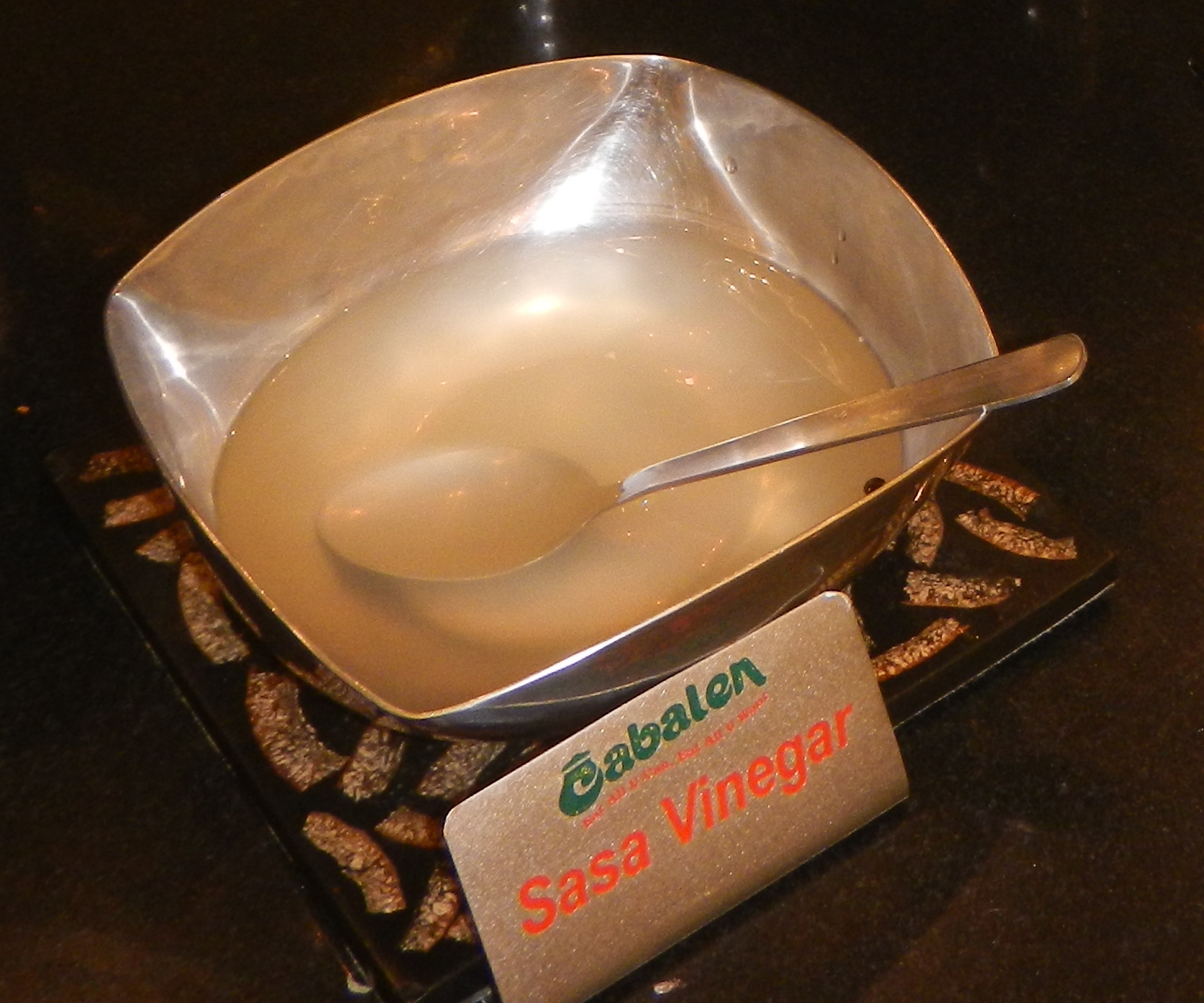
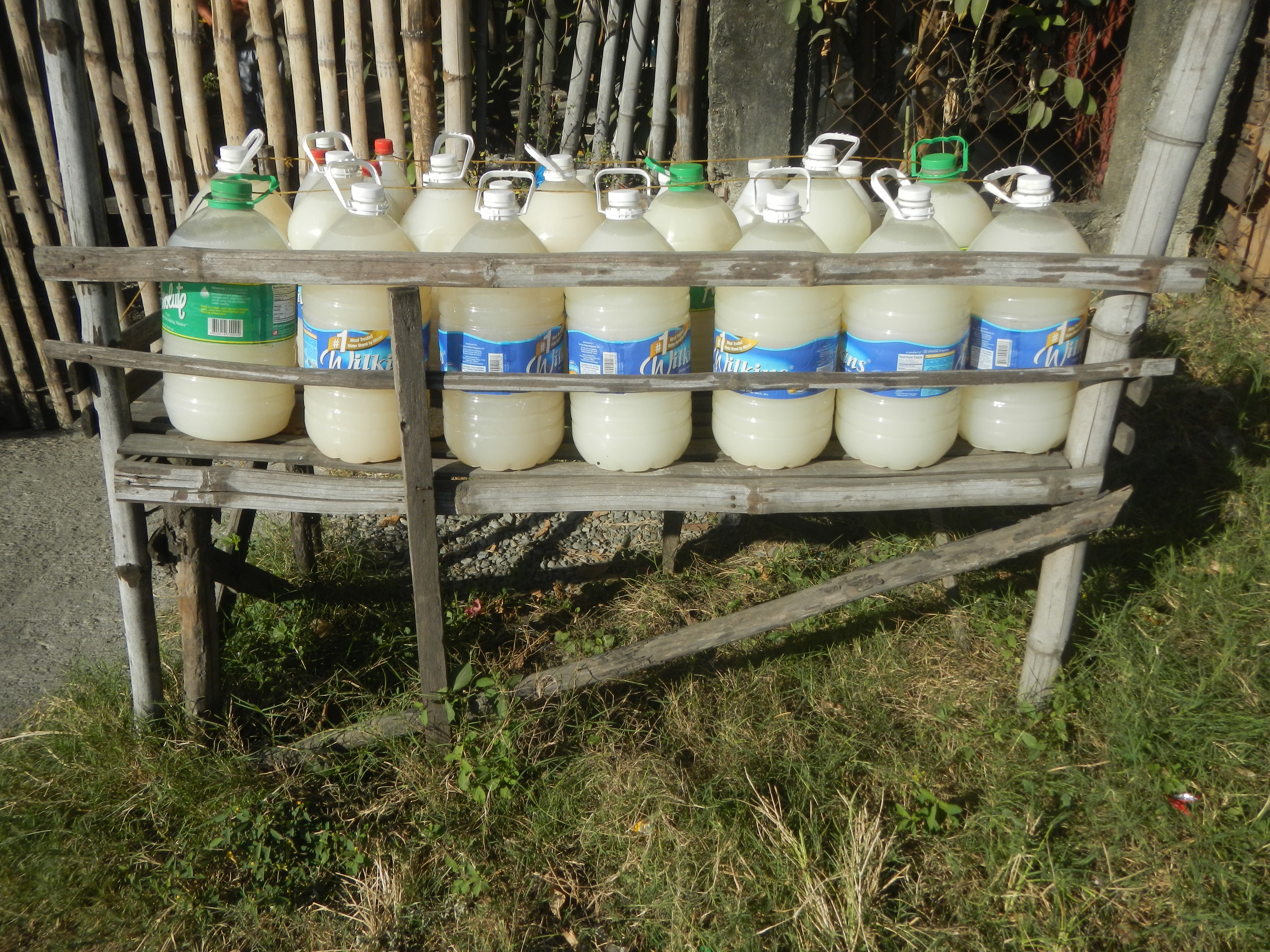
- Top: Nipa palm vinegar at a buffet; Bottom: Homemade nipa palm vinegar being sold in Paombong, Bulacan
- Alternative names: Nipa vinegar, sukang sasa, sukang nipa, sukang Paombong
- Type: Condiment, ingredient
- Place of origin: The Philippines
- Main ingredients: Nipa palm sap

Nipa palm vinegar, also known as sukang sasâ or sukang nipa, is a traditional Filipino vinegar made from the sap of the nipa palm (Nypa fruticans). It is one of the four main types of vinegars in the Philippines along with coconut vinegar, cane vinegar, and kaong palm vinegar. It is usually sold under the generic label of "palm vinegar".

Nipa palm vinegar is listed in the Ark of Taste international catalogue of endangered heritage foods by the Slow Food movement. Along with other traditional vinegars in the Philippines, it is threatened by the increasing use of industrially-produced vinegars.

== Names ==
Nipa palm vinegar is known as sukang sasâ or sukang nipa in native languages in the Philippines. Both nipa and sasâ are the native names of the nipa palm in Tagalog; while sukà (with the Tagalog enclitic suffix -ng) means "vinegar". It is also known as sukang Paombong after the town of Paombong, Bulacan where it is a traditional industry. The name of the town in turn is allegedly from the Tagalog bumbóng ("bamboo tube"), the main tool for gathering nipa sap before the use of plastic and glass containers. It is also sometimes known as sukang tubâ, from tubâ, the generic term for palm toddy in the Philippines, including coconut, buri palm (Corypha elata), and kaong palm (Arenga pinnata).

== Traditional production ==
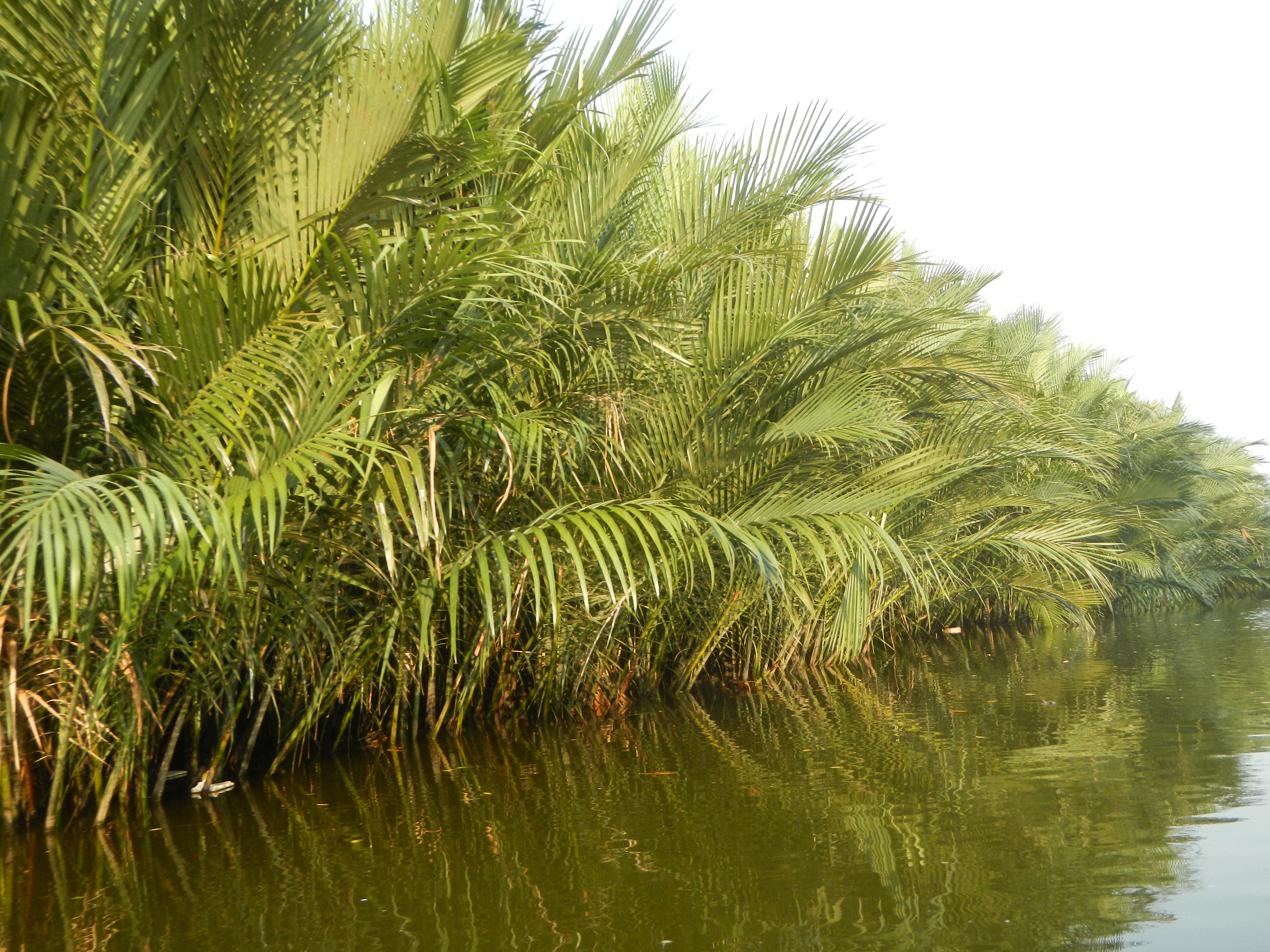
Nipa palms along the riverbanks in Bulacan

Nipa palm vinegar is gathered from mature nipa palms that grow in muddy soil beside brackish rivers and estuaries. The stalk of the nipa palm is cut and a container (traditionally bumbóng, bamboo tubes) is placed underneath to collect sap. The harvesters traditionally shake or kick the base of the leaves as they collect the containers to induce the sap the flow. They may also sometimes bend the stalk. Sap is collected twice a day as the tubes fill up, although it may take longer if done in the dry season.

The sap is placed in tapayan, large earthen jars traditionally used for fermentation. The sap relies on wild yeast to turn the sugars into ethanol. That turns the sap into a traditional palm toddy called tubâ. Leaving it to ferment further, however, allows Acetobacter from the air to oxidise the ethanol into acetic acid. It is harvested once the level of acidity reaches four or five percent. The length of time it takes to produce nipa palm vinegar ranges from two to three weeks, though it is faster if a starter culture of yeast is used.

Nipa palm sap has a relatively high sugar content, containing 15 to 22% sugar. This makes nipa palm vinegar slightly sweeter and less sharp than coconut vinegar. It is also slightly salty due to sodium content of the sap from the habitat of nipa palms. The vinegar when newly made is typically cloudy white. Due to the high iron content of the sap, the vinegar tends to turn orange to dark red as it ages. The vinegar also contains calcium, magnesium, and potassium. The sourness of the vinegar depends on how long it has been allowed to ferment.

== Modern production ==
The production of nipa palm vinegar is usually associated with the town of Paombong in the province of Bulacan, where it is a prevalent local industry. However, it is also produced in other parts of the Philippines. The production of nipa palm vinegar is labor-intensive and it is predominantly only sold in local markets. Usually in roadside stands or by hawkers along with tubâ palm wines. Along with other traditional vinegars in the Philippines, which also have problems penetrating the national market, it is threatened by the increasing use of industrially-produced vinegars. Many nipa farmers are converting their nipa plantations into fish farms. It is listed in the Ark of Taste international catalogue of endangered heritage foods by the Slow Food movement.

== Culinary uses ==
Vinegar is one of the most important ingredients in traditional Filipino cuisine. Like other types of vinegars, nipa palm vinegar is used primarily in dipping sauces (sawsawan). It may also be sold spiced with ginger, garlic, and chili peppers (which are boiled beforehand). It can also be used in salad dressings as well as an ingredient in various dishes like paksíw and atsara (pickles).

== See also ==
- Bahalina
- Basi
- Kaong palm vinegar
- Tapuy
