= Sobia =

Beverage consumed in Egypt and Saudi Arabia

Sobia سوبيا
- Origin: Egypt
- Introduced: Medieval Egypt
- Colour: White
- Ingredients: Egypt: rice, milk, coconut, sugar and sometimes vanilla Saudi Arabia: wheat flour, malt, sugar, and spices

Sobia or Subia (Arabic: سُوبْيا, romanized: Sūbyā) is a cold beverage commonly consumed in Egypt and Saudi Arabia, with each country having its own distinct version. In Egypt it is prepared from a mixture of coconut, rice, and milk, and typically served with ice. The original sobia was an alcoholic beverage made in Egypt from fermented rice water, without the inclusion of coconut, and likely dates back over 1,000 years. The modern Egyptian version, however, is a non-alcoholic, non-fermented drink that incorporates ingredients such as coconut, milk, and sometimes vanilla, which are not part of the original recipe. Sobia is one of the most popular beverages in Egypt, mostly consumed during the holy month of Ramadan.

Egyptian pilgrim caravans brought the drink to Saudi Arabia's Hijaz region centuries ago. The Saudi version is a fermented drink prepared from a mixture of wheat flour, malt, sugar, and spices.

== In Egypt ==
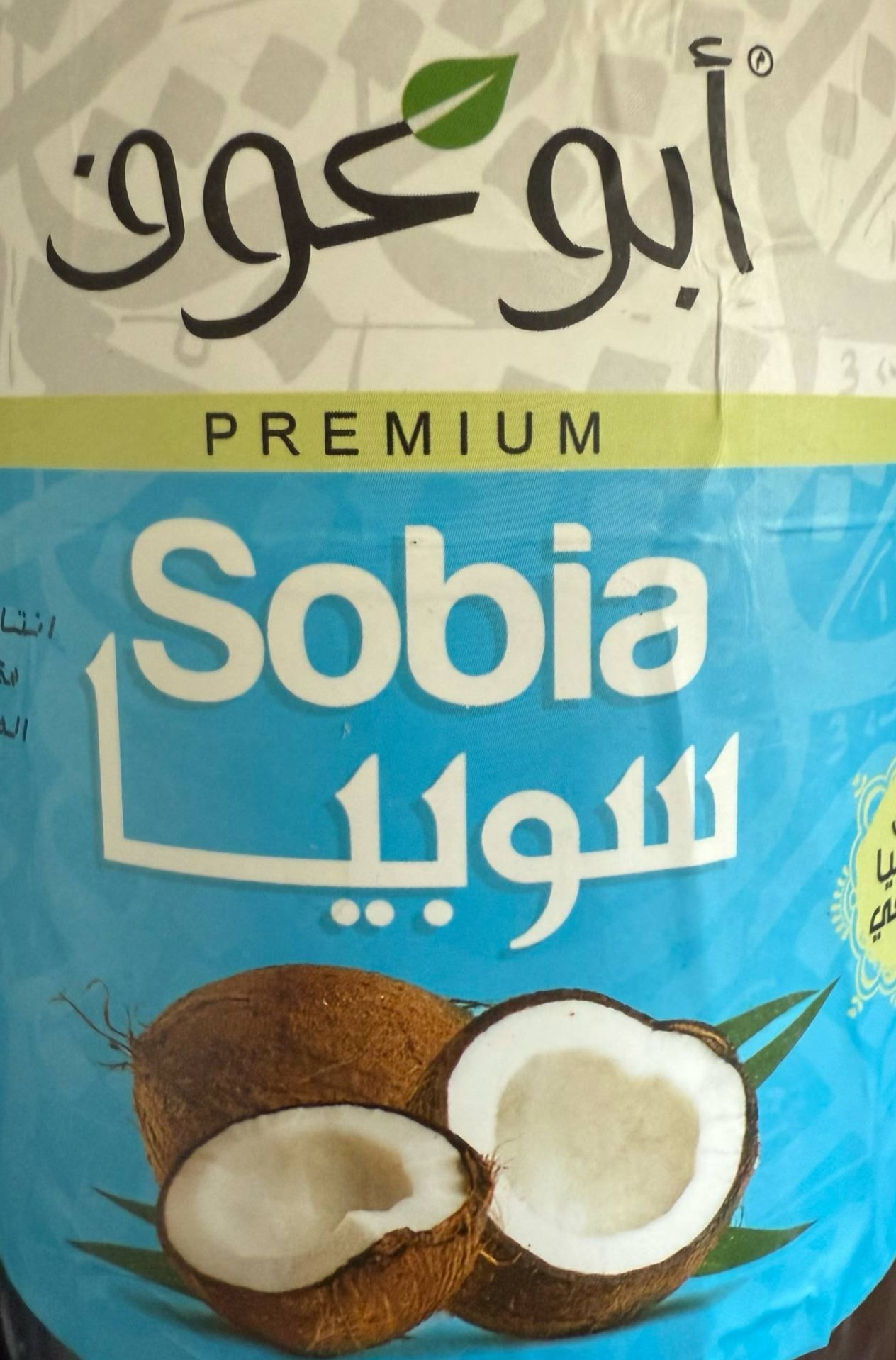
An Egyptian brand of sobia powder.

In Egypt, sobia is typically prepared by blending ground or cooked rice with coconut milk, sugar, and vanilla, and then straining the mixture before serving it well chilled. The drink usually has an off-white color, although some variations include food colorings to produce brighter hues. While sobia is consumed throughout the year, it is traditionally prepared during Ramadan and served as a fast-breaking drink. It is commonly made at home using pre-mixed powders or sold by street vendors in bottles or plastic bags.

Traditional sobia recipes are shared among families, resulting in slight variations in the preparation process. The most authentic method involves soaking raw short-grain rice for approximately two hours, then boiling the rice in water over low heat until the liquid is fully absorbed, which overcooks the rice and contributes to a creamier texture. After the rice has cooled, cold milk, coconut, sugar, and vanilla is added. The mixture is blended until smooth and then strained to achieve the desired consistency.

Alternatively, some households opt to grind the rice into a fine powder instead of boiling it. The resulting powder is dissolved in water and allowed to soak for several hours before being mixed with the remaining ingredients in a blender and filtered in the same manner. This method yields a sobia with a lighter consistency. In both variations, the beverage is served fresh with crushed ice.

== In Saudi Arabia ==
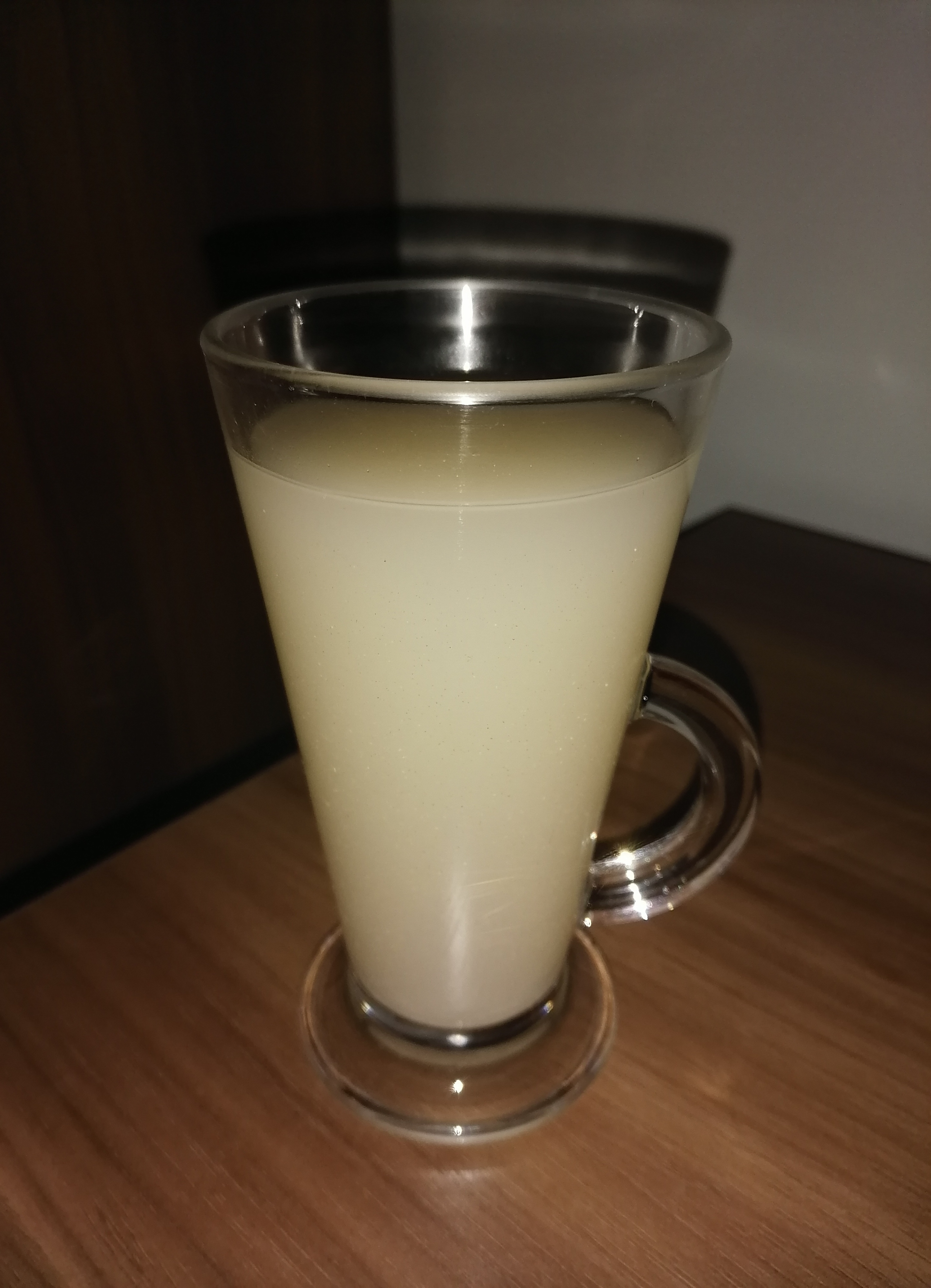
A glass of Saudi Arabian sobia

In Saudi Arabia, sobia is a fermented drink prepared from a mixture of wheat flour, malt, sugar, and spices. These ingredients are diluted in water and allowed to ferment naturally at ambient temperature, resulting in a refreshing beverage with very low alcohol content. Its nutritional properties are highly valued during Ramadan.

Sobia syrup is made from the ingredients of barley, dry bread, oats or raisins, after which filtering are added amounts of sugar, cardamom and cinnamon mixed in proportional amounts, then ice is added to it for cooling.

It is presented in multiple colours, white, which is the colour of barley, red with strawberry flavour, brown when tamarind is added to it, and it is recommended to eat it within two or three days because it loses its nutritional value after that. It is generally considered a refreshing drink.

The Saudi Food and Drug Authority indicated that there is a small percentage of ethanol (alcohol) that results from the self-fermentation process of juices and drinks, which are natural chemical reactions with added sugar.

In a report from 2007 locally produced sobia was found to contain alcohol levels far exceeding the permitted 0.3%, with tests indicating amounts up to five times higher. Scientific studies conducted by Umm Al-Qura University and King Abdul Aziz University revealed that, due to inadequate handling during production, the beverage showed increasing alcohol content over time, rising from 2.3% after 24 hours to 6.8% after 72 hours. These findings raised significant health and religious concerns, prompting local authorities to impose strict storage and sale regulations and calls for a broader regulatory intervention.
