= Bahalina =

Traditional Filipino palm wine

- Type: Palm wine
- Other name(s): Coconut red wine
- Origin: The Philippines, Visayas, Mindanao
- Alcohol by volume: 10%-13%
- Ingredients: Coconut or nipa palm sap, mangrove bark extracts

Bahalina, sometimes called "coconut red wine", is a traditional Filipino palm wine made from fermented coconut or nipa palm sap. It is derived from tubâ (palm toddy) which has been aged for several months to several years. It originates from the Visayas and Mindanao islands of the southern Philippines. It is deep brown-orange in color and has a slightly bitter astringent taste.

== Description ==
Bahalina is characteristically deep brown-orange in color due to the use of barok (also called tungog or tongog), the extracts from the dried bark (marka tungog or tangal) of certain mangrove species (Ceriops tagal, Rhizophora mucronata, or Vateria indica). The tannin-rich extracts prevent bahalina from souring, as well as adding a slight bitterness to the flavor.

Bahalina differs from the lambanog of Luzon in that lambanog is distilled and does not use barok and is thus milky-white or clear in color. Bahalina has around 10% to 13% abv (20 to 26 proof), which is higher than tubâ (2%-4% abv). However it has much lower alcohol content than lambanog which has 40%-45% abv (80 to 90 proof).

== Preparation ==
Bahalina starts with the manufacturing of tubâ (palm toddy), which is derived from the sap of coconut or nipa palm flower stalks that have been cut. The tubâ typically ferment first for a week or so in the bamboo gathering tubes left on the coconut tree. They are collected by the mananguete or manananggot (tubâ-gatherers) and immediately sealed tightly in traditional glass jugs or carboys, carefully ensuring no air pockets remain. The barok is added during these steps, either when still in the bamboo tubes or during the transfer to the jugs. After about a day to a few weeks, the tubâ ferments into bahal, which is mildly alcoholic and has a sour-sweet taste. This can be consumed as is.

To make bahalina, however, bahal is filtered with cloth to remove the sediments (laog) and then transferred to a new jug. This is repeated daily for three months to ensure that bahalina does not ferment into coconut vinegar. After this process, the jug is then buried underground at least 1 ft (0.30 m) deep or stored in cool cellars for at least two more months before it can be ready for consumption.

== Cultural significance ==
The traditional production of bahalina is widespread in the Visayas and Mindanao. It is sometimes characterized as a "poor man's drink", not because of its quality, but because it is relatively cheap in comparison to commercial alcoholic beverages. Bahalina aged from three to five years is usually preferred as it has a smoother taste. Bahalina does not taste like tubâ or bahal. Rather than the slightly sour-sweet taste of the latter two drinks, bahalina is slightly bitter and tangy. Bahalina is commonly drunk mixed with carbonated soft drinks which gives a sweeter dimension to the flavor, reminiscent of red wine.

Bahalina along with tubâ, bahal, and other traditional Filipino alcoholic drinks are celebrated annually in the Eastern Visayas in a wine tasting event dubbed as the "Oktubafest".

== See also ==
- Basi
- Kaong palm vinegar
- Lambanog
- Nipa palm vinegar
- Tapuy
