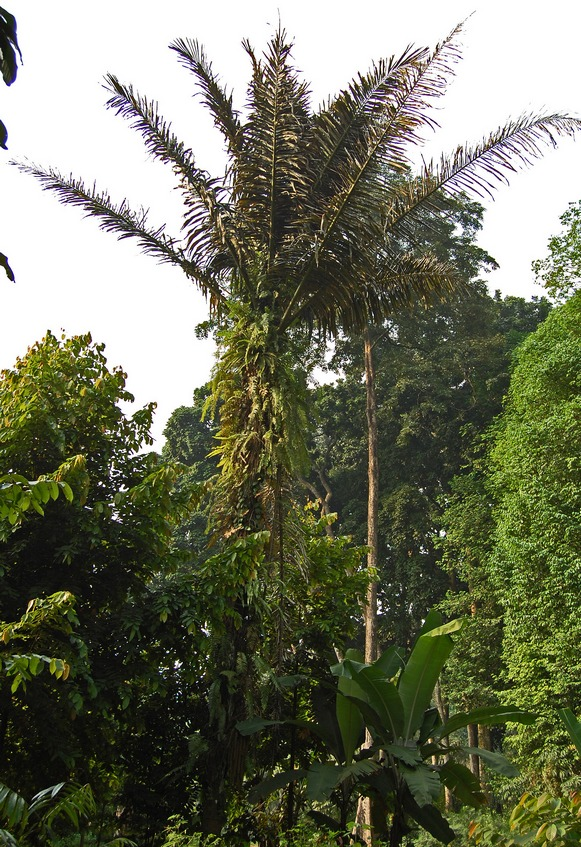

Scientific classification
- Kingdom: Plantae
- Clade: Tracheophytes
- Clade: Angiosperms
- Clade: Monocots
- Clade: Commelinids
- Order: Arecales
- Family: Arecaceae
- Genus: Arenga
- Species: A. pinnata

Binomial name
- Arenga pinnata (Wurmb) Merr.

= Arenga pinnata =

Species of palm

Arenga pinnata (syn. Arenga saccharifera) is an economically important feather palm native to tropical Asia, from eastern India east to Malaysia, Indonesia, and the Philippines in the east. Common names include sugar palm, areng palm (also aren palm or arengga palm), black sugar palm, and kaong palm, among other names.

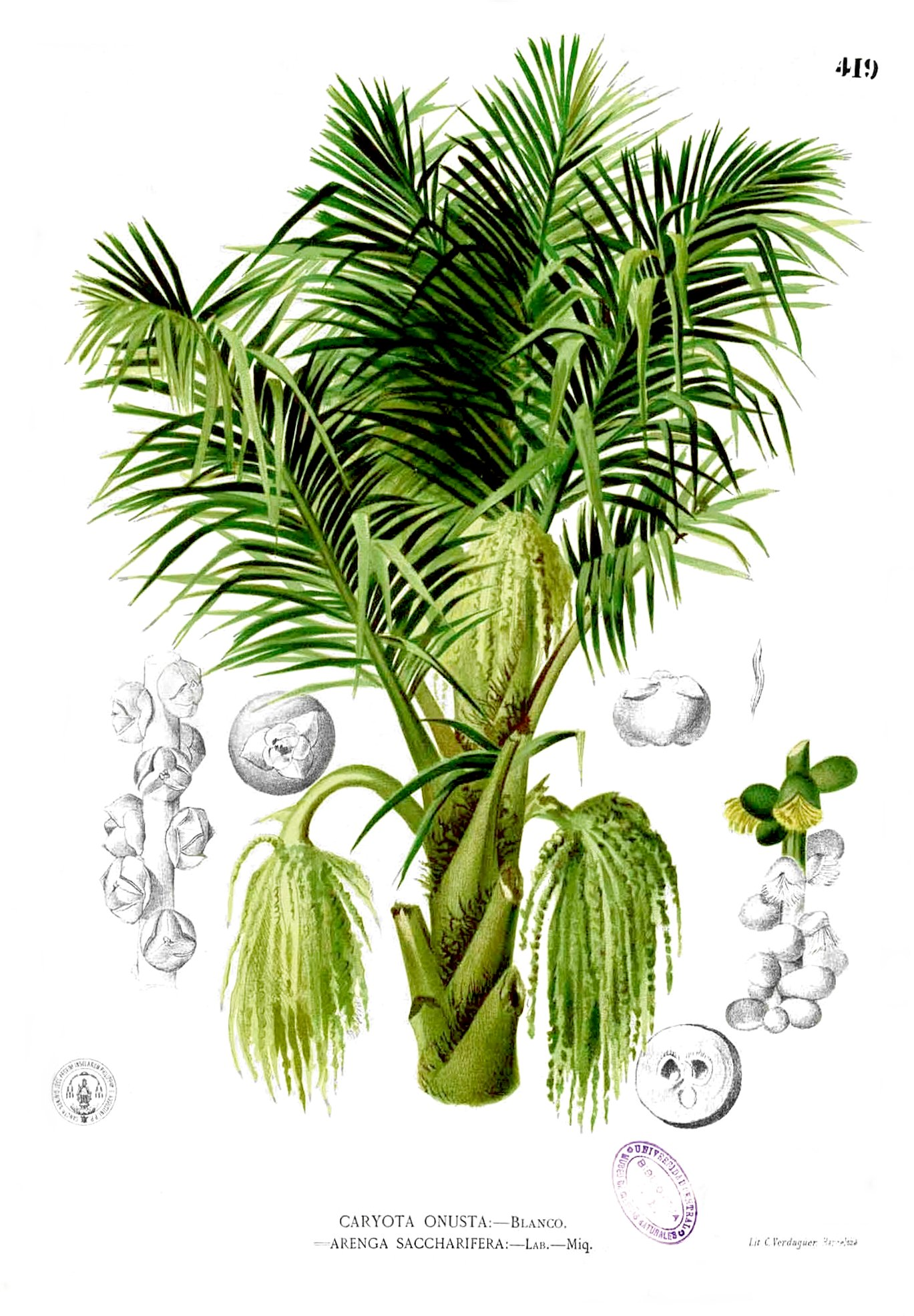
19th-century illustration from Flora de Filipinas by Francisco Manuel Blanco

== Description ==
It is a medium-sized palm, growing to 20 metres (66 feet) tall, with the trunk remaining covered by the rough old leaf bases. The leaves are 6–12 m (20–39 ft) long and 1.5 m (5 ft) broad, pinnate, with the pinnae in 1–6 rows, 40–70 centimetres (16–28 inches) long and 5 cm (2 in) broad. The fruit is subglobose, 7 cm (3 in) diameter, green maturing black. The palm is remarkable in two ways; first it is fast growing. One at the conservatory of the New York Botanic Garden grew to a height of 27 m (89 ft) in 25 years. Secondly it has very long pseudo-spines which look dangerous, but are not; possibly an example of Batesian mimicry.

== Ecology ==
A. pinnata suffers from the red palm weevil, Rhynchophorus ferrugineus, and is one of its major hosts in China.

It is not a threatened species, though it is locally rare in some parts of its range. It serves as an important part of the diet of several endangered species, including cloud rats of the genus Phloeomys.

== Uses ==
Many products of the palm are used, as food, as construction materials, and for other purposes.

=== Sap ===
The sap is harvested for commercial use in southeast Asia, yielding a sugar known as gur in India, gula aren in Indonesia, and pakaskas in the Philippines. The sap is collected and made as lahang, a traditional cold sweet drink, and is also fermented into vinegar (Filipino sukang kaong), palm wine (Filipino tubâ, Malaysian and Indonesian tuak, in eastern Indonesia sageru), which in turn is distilled into a spirit (sopi in Maluku, cap tikus in North Sulawesi).

Edmund Roberts talks about drinking an alcoholic beverage made in the Cavite area. He described it as a "fermented" and "intoxicating liquor". He said that it was "the pith furnished with sugar – when the liquor was properly boiled down, a farina...and of the inside of its triangular-shaped fruit a sweet bread was made."

Sugar (jaggery) is also commonly derived from the fresh sap in Indonesia and the Philippines. These are traditionally prevented from fermenting by placing crushed chili or ginger in the collecting container. The sap is boiled until it reduces to a thick syrup which is then dried into a brown sugar. Similar sugar extraction methods are also traditionally used for other sugar palms, such as the buri palm (Corypha elata).

The raw juice and pulp are caustic. This crop may develop into a major resource of biofuel (ethanol).

=== Fruit ===
The immature fruits are widely consumed in the Philippines (called kaong) and Indonesia (called buah kolang-kaling or buah tap) and are made into canned fruits after they are boiled in sugar syrup.

The seeds can be used in many different recipes, such as sour soup, or eaten with pandan juice, syrup, or coconut milk. These seeds have a chewy and sweet flavor .Young seeds are soft and easy to chew. When the fruits are overripe, they will have a harder texture.

The boiled water obtained from boiling fruits can also be utilized as a natural dye for fabrics.

=== Fruit stalk ===
The fruit stalk can be cut it into smaller stick used as firewood. Some people also utilized it as part of furniture.

=== Young shoot ===
In Thailand, some people eat the young shoot with chili sauce, and use them as cooking ingredients in dishes like soup.

=== Fibres ===
The dark fibrous bark (known as duk or doh in Javanese, and in India; iju, ejoo, eju or gomuti—a term that botanists applied as a specific or generic name to the whole plant)—in Malay; ijuk in Indonesia; and yumot or cabo negro in the Philippines), is manufactured into cordage, brushes, brooms, thatch roofing, or filters.

According to the study on bas-reliefs of Javanese ancient temples such as Borobudur, this type of roof is known in ancient Java vernacular architecture. It can be found today in Balinese temple roof architecture and Minangkabau Rumah Gadang gonjong horn-like curved roof architecture, such as those found in Pagaruyung Palace.

In Thailand, fibres were once used to create raincoats for miners called Jang Sui (Thai: จั่งซุ้ย). The cloth made of this plant has a rough texture, making it unsuitable for most clothing.

=== Leaves ===
The leaves as well as the leaf midribs can be used to weave baskets and marquetry work in furniture.

=== Starch ===
In Indonesia, starch can also be extracted from sugar palms and used in place of rice flour in noodles, cakes, and other dishes.

=== Trunk ===
The timber is used for high grade construction, posts, beams, flooring, interior finish, wharf bridge building and other uses where strength and durability are important.

The trunks are typically used for making tools and furniture. Weevils that live inside the trunk are sometimes collected as food by people harvesting the fruits.

=== Survival food ===
The seeds can be boiled and the stem tips can be eaten as vegetables. The young flower stalks can be bruised to obtain the juice.

== Harvesting ==
Various methods are employed to climb and harvest the fruits. In some regions in Thailand, locals make use of a bamboo ladder with natural step-like protrusions which in Thai known as Phaong (Thai: พะอง). Harvesters use a vine to attach this bamboo ladder to the trunk, providing them with steps to climb up and reach the fruits. Some areas utilize hemp rope and slingshot. However, this method requires at least 2 people to collect the fruits as one of them must be responsible for climbing trees and harvesting the fruits, while the other stays on the ground to pull the climbing rope.

During sap harvesting period, workers collect the sap twice a day, once in the morning and again in the evening. From a single tree, they typically obtain around 15-20 liters of fresh sap in each harvest. Bamboo tubes or plastic buckets are utilized to collect the dripping sap.

== Culture ==
In the Philippines, an annual Irok Festival is celebrated in the municipality of Indang in Cavite which is a major producer of kaong fruits, sukang kaong, and tubâ in the country. Irok is a local name for Arenga pinnata in the northwestern Philippines.

The world's first ever crossword puzzle, labelled "Word-Cross" in the 21 December 1913 edition of New York World newspaper's Sunday Fun supplement and created by Arthur Wynne, a Liverpool, UK-born journalist, included a clue: The fibre of the gomuti plant. The answer was doh.

In some areas of southern Thailand, such as Ban Khlong Bor Saen and Bang Toei, Phang Nga, cultural beliefs associated with Arenga pinnata are prevalent. The trees are intertwined with the locals' lives and serve as a source of income for the villagers over generations. The locals typically call this plant Chok (Thai: ชก) or Nao (Thai: เหนา) . However, it has a nickname "Ton Luk Kha Mae" (Thai: ต้นลูกฆ่าแม่) which means a child kills its mother, as the Arenga pinnata in those areas can produce fruits only once in its lifetime and it will perish within 4 -5 years.

A belief revolves around the practice of singing and dancing during the sap tapping process. Locals believe that when the tree is surrounded by music, it yields abundantly and the sap quality is enhanced. While climbers harvest sap, some ground workers actively engage in singing and dancing.

Moreover, some locals have specific classifications for the female trees dividing them into three types, which are Nao saw (Thai: เหนาสาว), Nao Mae Mai (Thai: เหนาแม่ม่าย), and Nao Kae (Thai: เหนาแก่). The word “Nao” refers to the tree while each subsequent word provides a different meaning that signifies the duration the tree has been tapped for sap.

Nao Saw (Thai: เหนาสาว) refers to the trees that have not been used to collect sap before. The term “Saw” (Thai: สาว) means young woman.

Nao Mae Mai (Thai: เหนาแม่หม้าย) refers to the trees that have been used to collect sap, with the process repeated around a year. The term “Mae Mai” (Thai: แม่หม้าย) means widow.

Nao Kae (Thai: เหนาแก่) refers to the trees that have been used to collect sap continuously for three years or more including very old ones. The term “Kae” (Thai: แก่) means old.

== Gallery ==
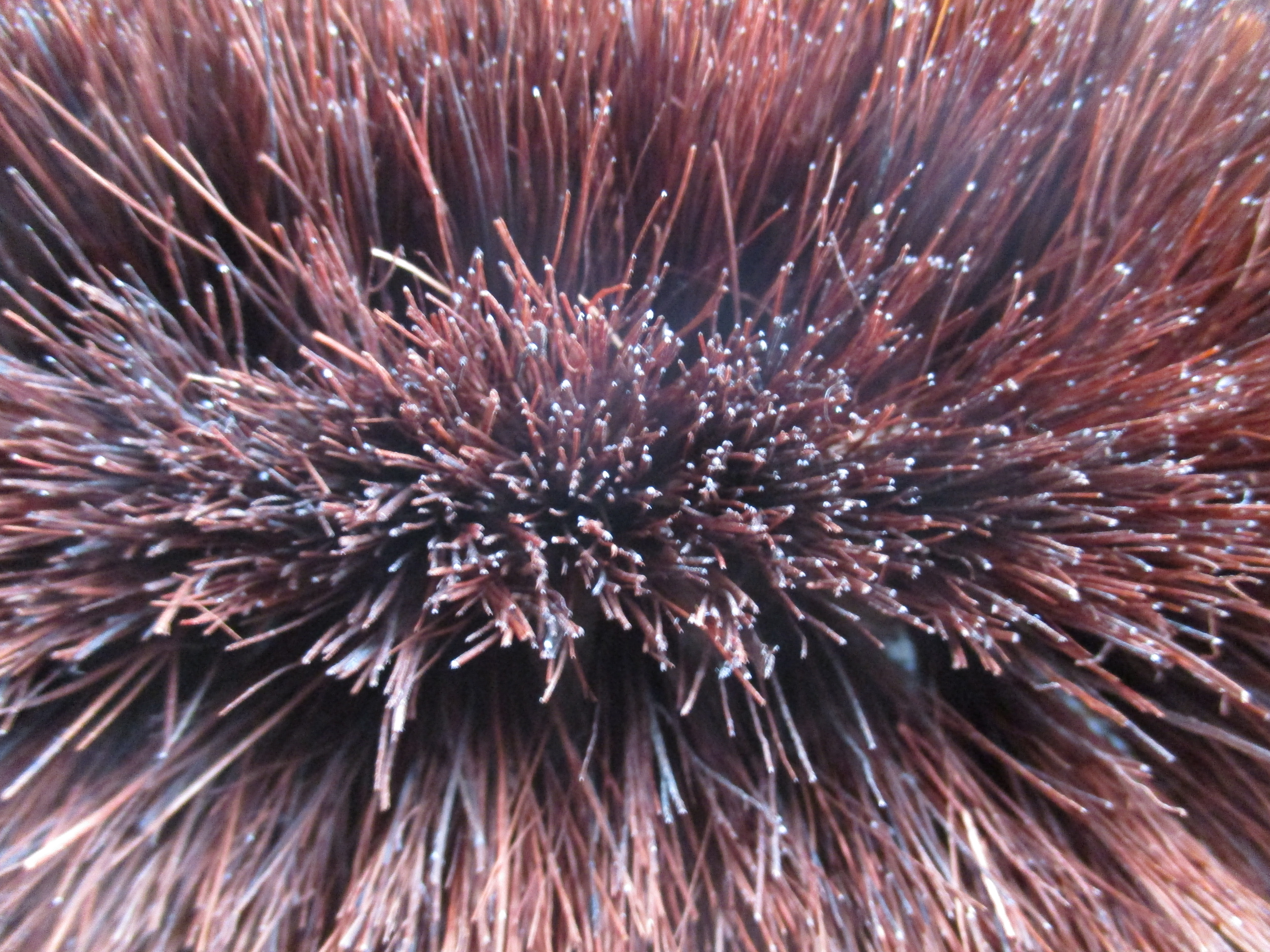
Bark fiber

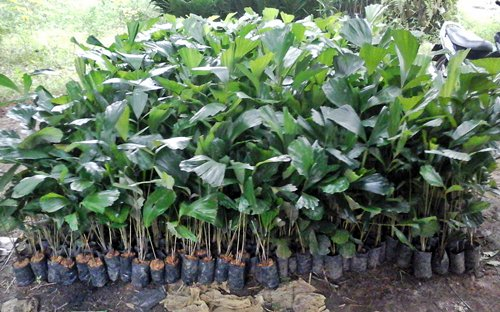
Saplings from North Sumatra

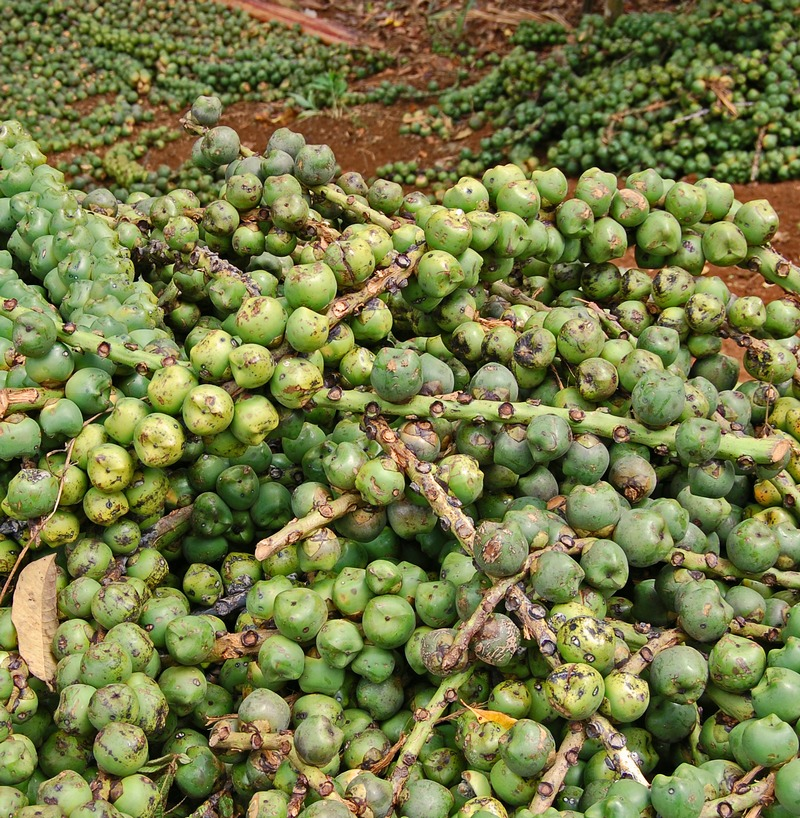
Fruits harvested from Java

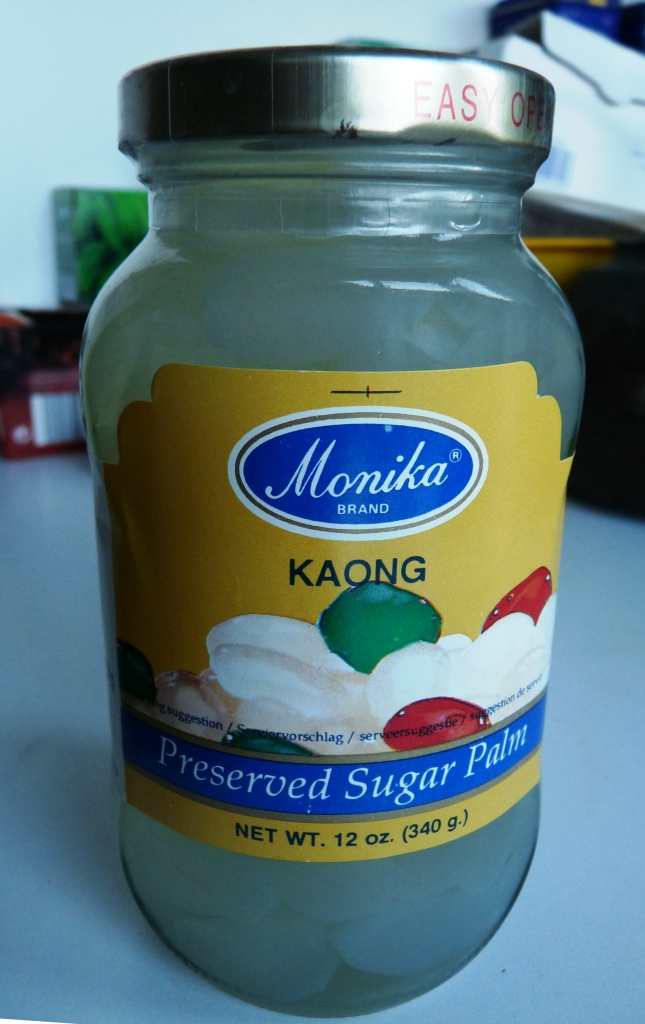
Fruits preserved in syrup from the Philippines are commonly sold internationally as "kaong"
