= Kaong palm vinegar =

Type of Filipino vinegar

- Alternative names: irok palm vinegar, arengga palm vinegar, sukang kaong, sukang irok
- Type: condiment, ingredient
- Place of origin: Philippines
- Main ingredients: Arenga pinnata sap

Kaong palm vinegar, also known as irok palm vinegar or arengga palm vinegar, is a traditional Filipino vinegar made from the sap of the kaong sugar palm (Arenga pinnata). It is one of the four main types of vinegars in the Philippines, along with coconut vinegar, cane vinegar, and nipa palm vinegar. It is usually sold under the generic label of "palm vinegar".

== Names ==
Kaong palm vinegar is also known as sukang kaong or sukang irok, from kaong and irok, the native Filipino name for Arenga pinnata; and sukâ (with the Tagalog enclitic suffix -ng) means "vinegar". It is also sometimes known as sukang tubâ, from tubâ, the general term for palm toddy produced from various palm trees in the Philippines, including coconut, buri palm (Corypha elata), and nipa palm (Nypa fruticans).

== Traditional production ==
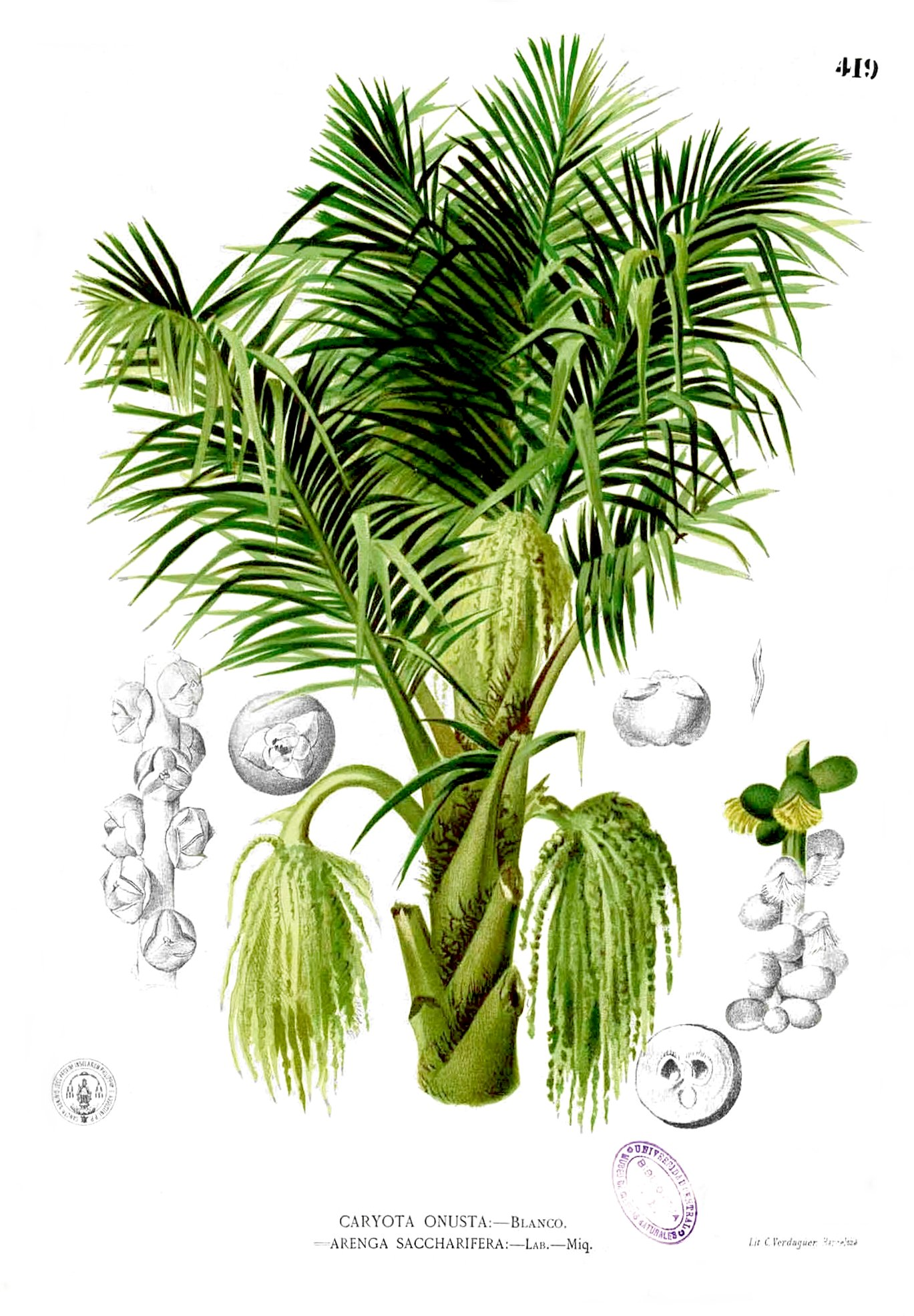
Arenga pinnata illustration by Francisco Manuel Blanco from Flora de Filipinas (1880-1883)

Kaong sugar palms (Arenga pinnata) are solitary monoecious palm trees usually found in riverbanks and ravines throughout Southeast Asia. They are used widely in maritime Southeast Asia for various products. In the Philippines, they are most commonly harvested for their fibers, leaves, fruits and their sap, which is used in the production of tubâ (palm toddy) in addition to vinegar. The palms become sexually mature and start producing large fruit and flower clusters at ten to twelve years, but sometimes they can flower as early as five to six years. They are difficult to farm and their propagation usually relies heavily on local wild populations of Asian palm civets (musang or alamid), which spread the seeds after eating the fruit.

Sap can only be harvested from mature palms, as they are collected from the stalks of the male inflorescences. The flowers take a few months to develop. Before they are ready, the harvesters (mangangarit) climb the trees and shake the stalks daily to induce the flow of sap. Once the flowers bloom, the stalk is cut and a collecting container (usually bamboo) is placed over it. Harvesters climb the trees daily to collect the sap. They transfer it to special bamboo containers slung along one shoulder known as tukil.

The sap are then poured into large earthen fermenting jars called tapayan. The sap relies on wild yeast to turn the sugars into ethanol. This turns the sap into a traditional palm toddy called tubâ. Leaving it to ferment further, however, allows Acetobacter from the air to oxidise the ethanol to acetic acid. It is harvested once the level of acidity reaches four or five percent. The length of time it takes to produce nipa palm vinegar ranges from three to four weeks, though it is faster if a starter culture of yeast is used.

== Modern production ==
Modern mass production of kaong palm vinegars add additional steps to the traditional process to standardize the acidity and sugar levels. The vinegar fermented in tapayan jars are pasteurized and then stored in food-grade plastic drums. They are allowed to age further for two months to three years before being bottled. Kaong palm vinegars contain benzoic acid, calcium, iron, magnesium, potassium, sodium.

== Culinary use ==
Kaong palm vinegar tend to be sweeter and is the least sour among traditional Filipino vinegars. Like other types of vinegars, kaong palm vinegar is used primarily in dipping sauces (sawsawan). It can also be used in salad dressings as well as an ingredient in various dishes.

== Other countries ==
Similar vinegars are made in Indonesia and Malaysia from the kaong palm. But since kaong palm vinegar is a by-product of alcohol fermentation, it is not as widespread as in the Philippines and is restricted to Christian communities like in central and northern Sulawesi. Most kaong palm in Indonesia and Malaysia are cultivated for their fruits and fiber, as well as sugar (jaggery) production.

== See also ==
- Nipa palm vinegar
- Bahalina
- Basi
- Tapuy
