= Tapuy =

Fermented rice wine from the Luzon highlands in the Philippines

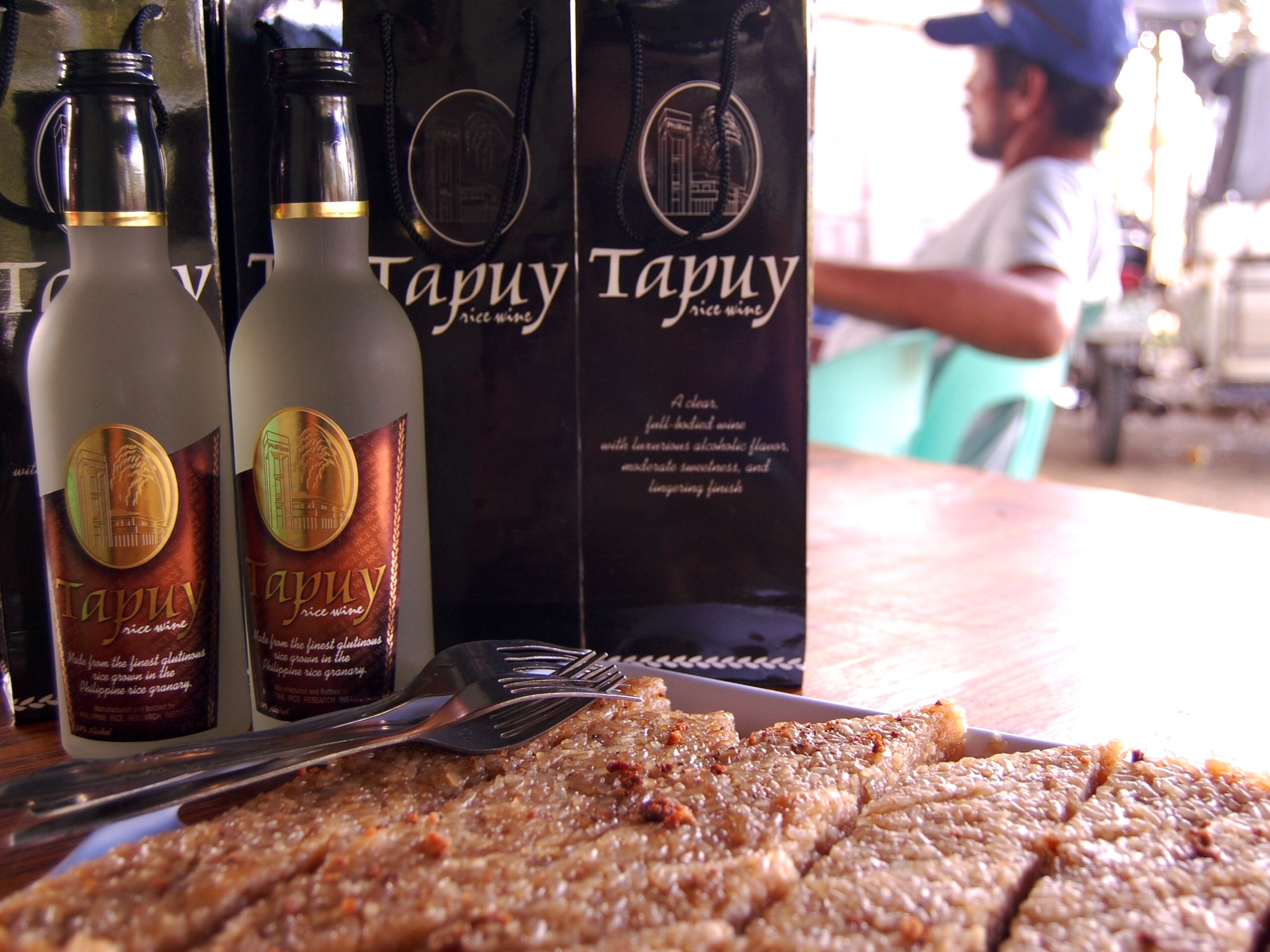
- Tapuy with biko rice cakes
- Type: Rice wine
- Origin: The Philippines, Cordillera Administrative Region
- Alcohol by volume: 14–19%
- Ingredients: Rice

Tapuy, also spelled tapuey or tapey, is a rice wine produced in the Philippines. It is a traditional beverage and originated from Banaue and Mountain Province, where it is used for important occasions like weddings, rice harvesting ceremonies, fiestas and cultural fairs. It is produced from either pure glutinous rice or a combination of glutinous and non-glutinous rice together with onuad roots, ginger extract, and a powdered starter culture locally known as bubod. Tapuy is an Ilocano name. The wine is more commonly called baya or bayah in Igorot languages.

== Etymology ==
Tapuy is derived from Proto-Malayo-Polynesian *tapay ("fermented [food]"), which in turn is derived from Proto-Austronesian *tapaJ ("fermented [food]"). Derived words refer to a wide variety of fermented food throughout Austronesia, including yeasted bread (Tagalog: tinapay) and rice wine. Tapuy is a variant of the widespread Austronesian rice paste or rice wine tapai (or tapay in Philippine languages).

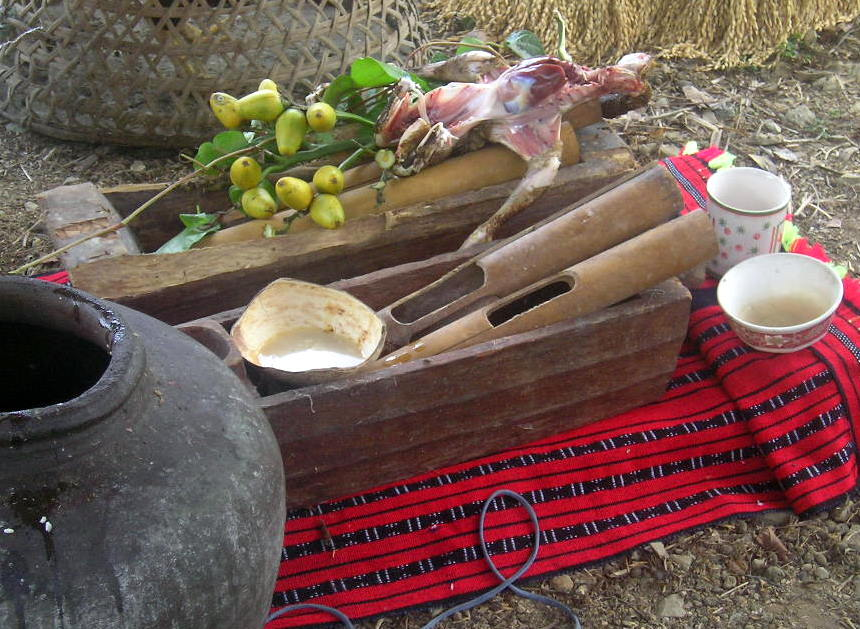
A jar and bowls of baya (tapuy) in a harvest ritual by an Ifugao mumbaki (shaman)

Proto-Malayo-Polynesian *tapay-an also refers to large earthen jars originally used for this fermentation process. Cognates in modern Austronesian languages include tapayan (Tagalog), tepayan (Iban), and tempayan (Javanese and Malay).

== Description ==
The characteristics of tapuy, as in many other rice wines, depend on the process and ingredients used by each manufacturer. However, in general, tapuy is a clear full-bodied wine with a strong alcoholic flavor, moderately sweet and often leaves a lingering taste. The alcohol content is 28 proof or about 14 percent. It has no sulfites (which are preservatives found in other wines) that sometimes cause adverse reactions like hang-over and allergies. Tapuy is also not diluted with water and has no sugar added.

The process of producing commercial tapuy starts with weighing and washing selected rice. Then, the rice is cooked, cooled and inoculated with a natural starter culture, locally known as bubod. After that, a process of natural pre-fermentation and natural fermentation follows. Once the fermentation is completed, the fresh wine can be harvested and pasteurized. After the pasteurization, the rice wine is aged, filtered and clarified before bottling. Finally bottled rice wine is pasteurized once again before sealing.

== Traditions ==
Once a year during the Ipitik festival, rice wine brewers from all over Mountain Province gather together to bring their best rice wine concoctions. The whole day of merrymaking is filled with wood-carving contests, art exhibits, and large cook-outs that aim to feed hundreds of people. There are gangsà (gong) players, mostly children, who dance while playing a lively beat.

== See also ==
- Pangasi
