= Philippine wine =

Wine making in Philippines

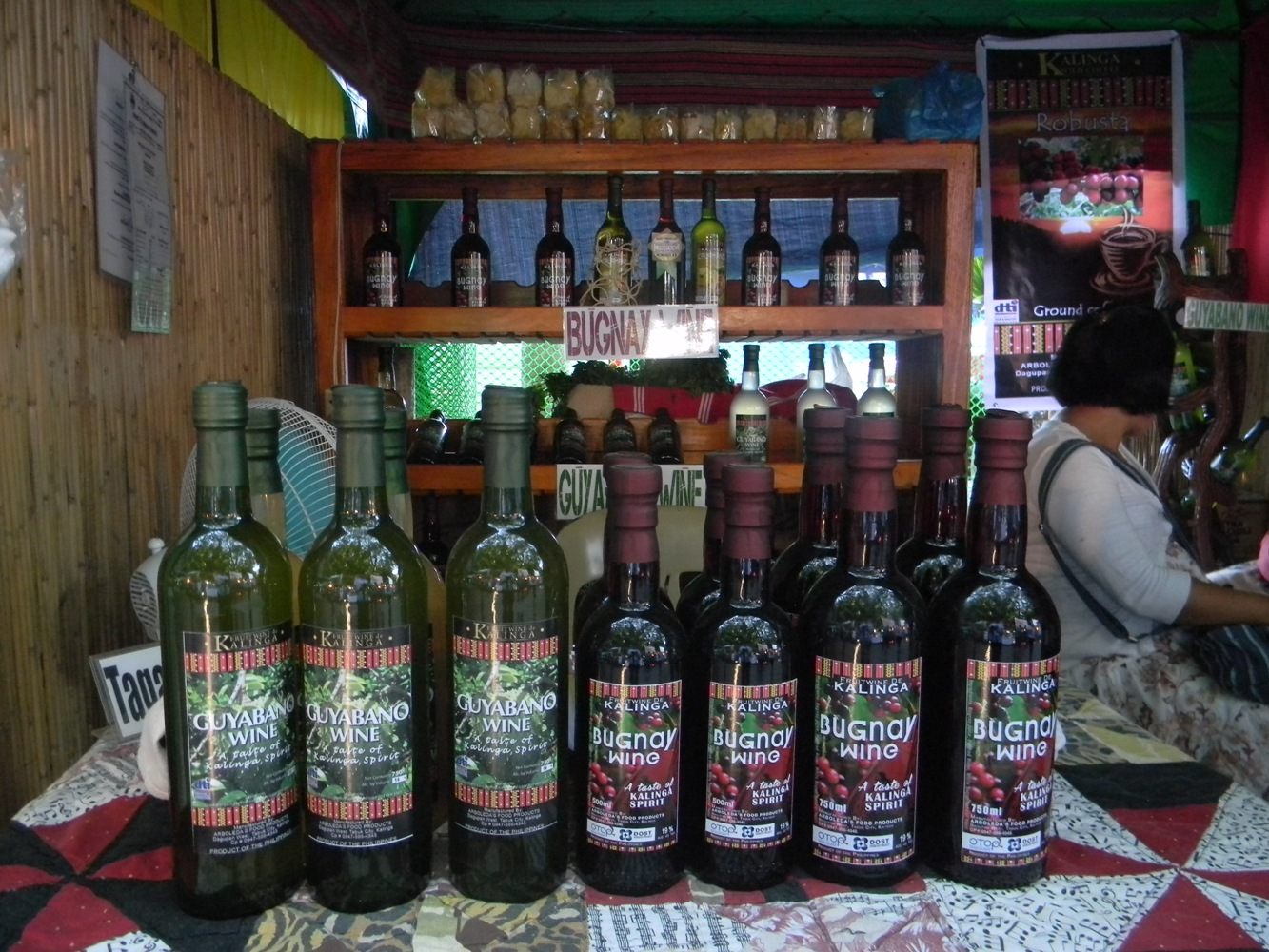
Fruit wines produced from guyabano (soursop) and bignay by Kalinga women

Philippine wine or Filipino wine are various wines produced in the Philippines. They include indigenous wines fermented from palm sap, rice, job's tears, sugarcane, and honey; as well as modern wines mostly produced from various fruit crops.

== Pre-colonial ==
Indigenous wine-making traditions in the Philippines dates back to before the colonization of the islands by the Spanish in the 16th century. They were usually part of the traditional tapay fermentation process and were fermented inside earthen jars known as tapayan. They were consumed both for recreation and in the animist rituals in the various indigenous anito religions. Heavy consumption of tubâ and other alcoholic beverages in the Philippines were reported by early Spanish colonizers. Social drinking (tagayan or inuman in Tagalog and Visayan languages) was and continues to be an important aspect of Filipino social interactions. Indigenous wines include the following:

=== Palm wines ===
Among the most widely prevalent wines produced in the Philippines is the tubâ which is produced from palm saps. The most common types of tubâ are made from coconut and nipa palm sap. Tubâ can also be made from the kaong palm (Arenga pinnata) and fishtail palms (Caryota spp.), which are known as tuhak and tunggang, respectively.

A notable variant of tubâ from the Visayan peoples of Visayas and Mindanao is the bahalina, which is distinctively reddish-brown in color due to the use of bark extracts from certain mangrove species. Tubâ is also commonly consumed with raw egg yolks and other sweet ingredients, a combination known as kinutil.

During the Spanish colonial period, distillation technologies were adopted by native Filipinos as early as 1574, resulting in improvised stills known as kawa. These were used to distill tubâ into a palm liquor known as vino de coco or vino de nipa, which is now known as lambanóg in modern times.

=== Rice wines ===
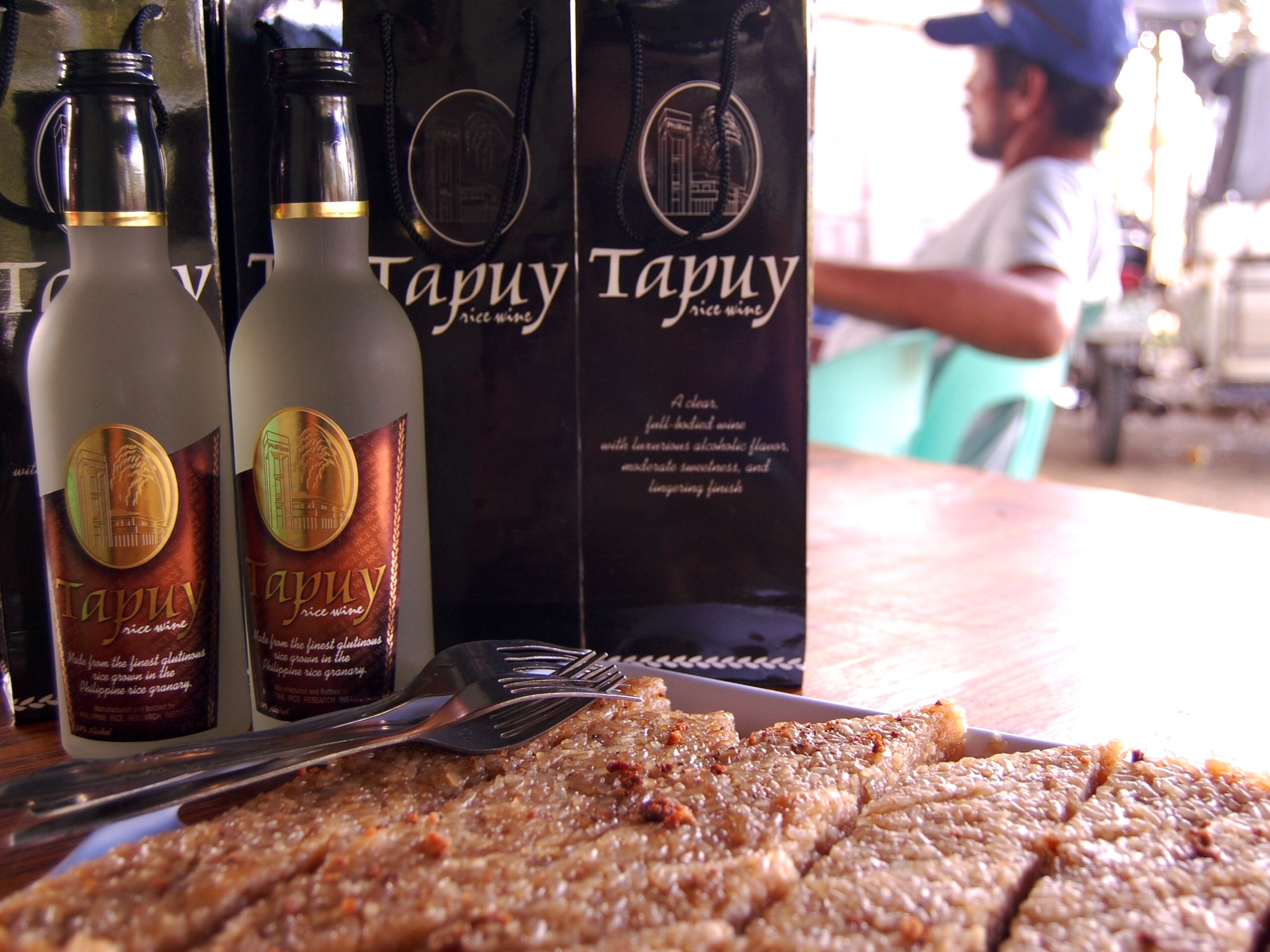
Tapuy, a rice wine of the Igorot people

Rice wine is named as tapuy in Ilocano, baya or bayah in Ifugao, and tapey in Igorot, pangasi in western Mindanao. For the Igorots, It is made by boiling rice and drying it on baskets. When it is dry, it is mixed with bubud, a mixture of rice flour and separated parts of anguad, a flowering plant. It is then turned into a ball with water, dried again in the sun, and once again powdered. It is then added to jars to ferment. Rice wines used to be common in pre-colonial times, as part of the process of tapay production, but now only survive among relatively isolated ethnic groups in the islands.

The pangasi of the Visayans, for example, is now virtually extinct. However, a version survives among the Subanen people, which can also be made from job's tears (adlay), though even this is starting to disappear as the starch source is increasingly being replaced by cassava. Pangasi also survives among the Sulodnon people of Panay, though it has also been replaced with sugarcane.

Among the Manobo people of Bukidnon, a similar rice wine exists called agkud. It is flavored with ginger and sugarcane juice. In the northern Philippines, the only surviving rice wine is the tapuy of the Igorot people, also known locally as baya. It is mixed with ginger and roots. It is a very important part of traditional rituals of the highland tribes.

=== Sugarcane wines ===
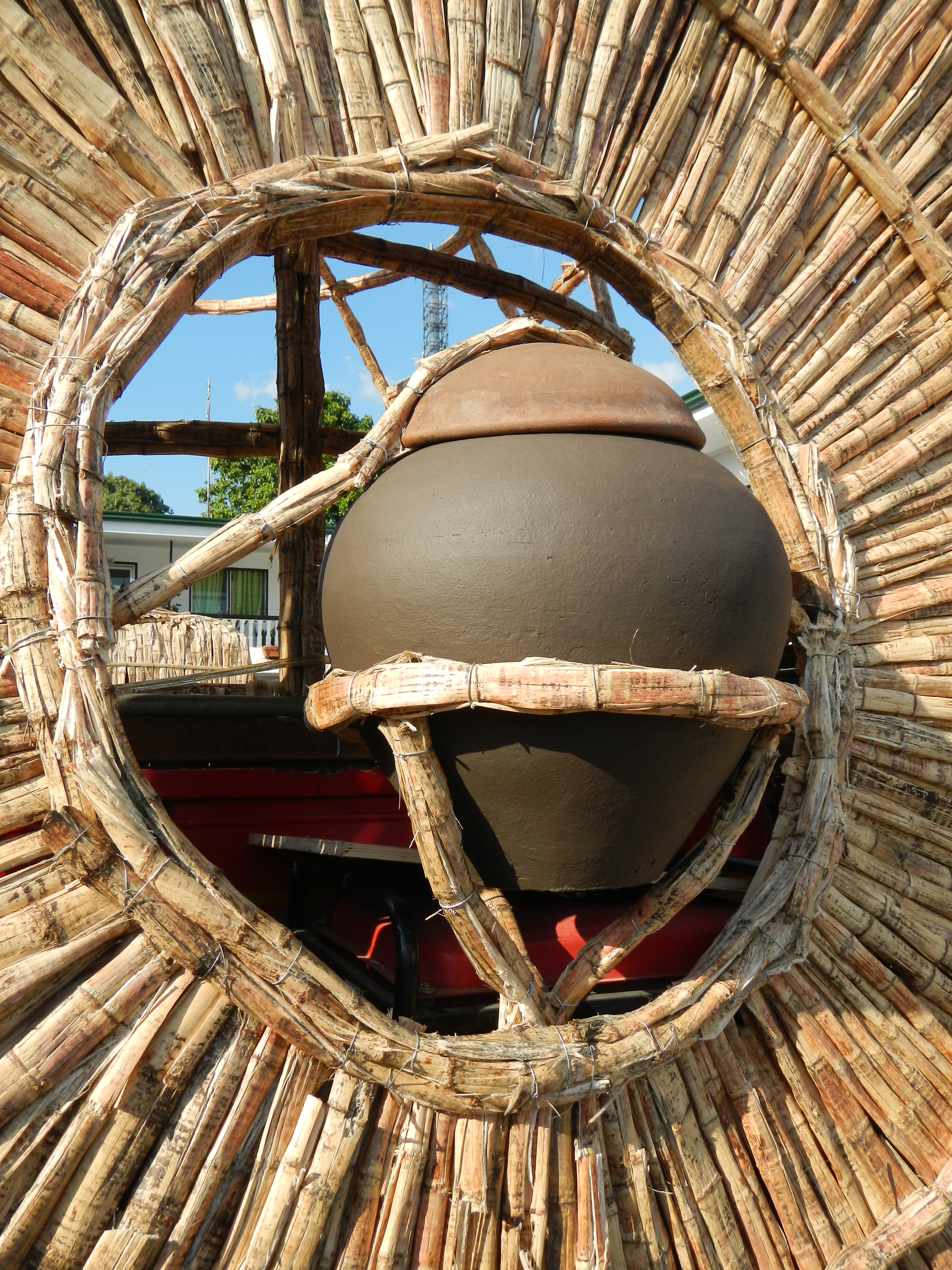
Traditional fermentation of basi wine in a burnay jar, a method used in Ilocano winemaking

Sugarcane wines include the basi of the Ilocanos and the palek of the Ivatan. Basi starts at boling around 50 liters of bennal, the sap of pressed sugarcane, into a sinublan which is a large cooking pan. Bark of a samak tree is added to colorize it, and then the leaves of the tree is added. It is then stirred periodically. Scum that floats on top of the liquid is removed. Once it loses a few liters from boiling, it is then decanted to a jar called burnai and is left for a day to cool. Parek is added, which is a mixture of the sap from the sugarcane and the fruit and leaves of samak tree. It is then covered by the leaves of samak tree, and it is placed underground for it to ferment and age. It can be drunk after two months.

Basi is notable in that it caused the 1807 Basi Revolt when Spanish authorities tried to ban the private manufacture of basi.

Another sugarcane wine was the intus of Visayas and Mindanao. It is largely extinct, though it still partially survives among the Lumad peoples of Mindanao where it is flavored with langkawas (Alpinia galanga) or pal-la (Cordyline fruticosa) roots.

=== Mead ===
Mead made from honey were rare, even in precolonial times. They are now extinct and only known from colonial sources. They include the kabarawan of the Visayans which was made from honey mixed with bark from the kabarawan tree (Neolitsea villosa); and the bais of the Mandaya and Manobo people which is made from honey and water.

Most of the modern wines produced in the country are based on locally produced crops with grape-based wines mostly imported from Australia and European countries. In 2012, it was reported that previous attempts to produce grapes which are suitable enough for wine making in northern Philippines failed due to unsuitable soil conditions and high temperatures.

Modern local wines are mostly fruit wines, including bignay wine made from bignay berries (Antidesma bunius); guyabano wine made from soursop (Annona muricata); mangosteen wine made from mangosteen; duhat wine made from black plum (Syzygium cumini); and mango wine made from Philippine mangoes. Another locally produced wine is oregano wine from Quezon produced from Cuban oregano (Plectranthus amboinicus).

Liqueurs produced from the colonial era are also commonly sold as "wine". The most popular are anisado, anise liqueurs generally infused with various herbal ingredients by early Chinese-Filipino immigrants. A notable variant of anisado is anisado Mallorca, or simply Mallorca, which adds sugar and can also be used as a cooking wine.

== See also ==
- Winemaking
- History of wine
