= Kallur =

Kallur may refer to:

== Places in India ==
- Kallur, Chittoor, town in the Chittoor district of Andhra Pradesh
- Kallur, Thrissur, Kallur is a small village in Thrissur district of Kerala, southwest India
- Kallur, Tumkur, town in the Tumkur district of Karnataka
- Kallur, Belgaum, Karnataka
- Kallur, Dharwad, Karnataka
- Kallur, Palakkad, village in Palakkad district in Kerala
- Kallur, Khammam district, census town in Khammam district in the Indian state of Andhra Pradesh
- Kallur, Kurnool district, town in the Kurnool district of Andhra Pradesh
- Kallur, Kumbakonam, Thanjavur district, Tamil Nadu
- Kallur archaeological site in the Raichur district of Karnataka state
- Kallur, Pudukkottai, village in the Arimalamrevenue block of Pudukkottai district, Tamil Nadu, India
- Kallur Sharif, Punjab, town and union council of Mianwali District in the Punjab province of Pakistan
- Kallur, Yelburga, also spelled as Kallooru, village in the Yelburga taluk of Koppal district in the Indian state of Karnataka

== People ==
- Anders Kallur (born 1952), professional ice-hockey player
- Susanna Kallur (born 1981), Swedish hurdler
- Jenny Kallur (born 1981), Swedish hurdler and sprinter
- Kallur Subba Rao (1897–1972), Indian activist and politician
- Shalil Kallur, Indian film director, producer, and screenwriter for Malayalam language films

== See also ==
- Kallu (disambiguation)
- Kallu (name)
