= Byais =

Traditional Filipino wine

- Type: Mead
- Origin: Philippines, Davao de Oro

Byais (also spelled bya-is, biya-is, or biyais) is a traditional Filipino wine from the Mansaka people of Davao de Oro. It is made from boiled lengkuas (pal'la, palla, panla, or pangla in Mansaka) mixed with honey or sugarcane juice which are then fermented in tightly sealed earthen jars (tadyaw). It has a sharp flavor reminiscent of citrus fruits or pine needles.

== See also ==
- Bais
- Kabarawan
- Intus
- Mead
- Sima
