= Kalju =

Kalju may refer to several things associated with Estonia:

- Kalju, Lääne County, village in Lääne-Nigula Parish
- Kalju, Saare County, village in Saaremaa Parish
- Kalju (given name), Estonian male given name
- JK Nõmme Kalju, football club based in Nõmme, Tallinn

== See also ==
- Kallu (name)
- Kilju, Finnish home-made alcoholic beverage
