= Bais (wine) =

Traditional Filipino mead

- Type: Mead
- Origin: Philippines, Caraga

Bais is a traditional Filipino mead from the Mandaya and Dibabawon Manobo of northeastern Mindanao. It is made from a mixture of honey and water at varying proportions. It is fermented for at least five days to a month or more.

== See also ==
- Byais
- Kabarawan
- Intus
- Mead
- Sima
