= Le Ménagier de Paris =

French medieval guidebook

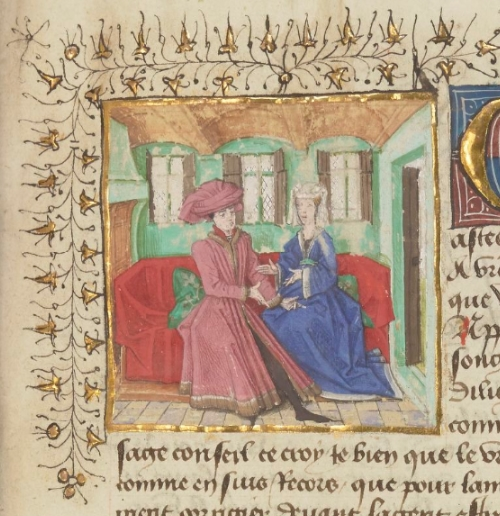
Detail of a miniature from a 15th-century manuscript

Le Ménagier de Paris (French: [lə menaʒje də paʁi]; often abbreviated as Le Ménagier; English: "The Parisian Household Book") is a French medieval guidebook from 1393 on a woman's proper behaviour in marriage and running a household. It includes sexual advice, recipes, and gardening tips. Written in the (fictional) voice of an elderly husband addressing his younger wife, the text offers a rare insight into late medieval ideas of gender, household, and marriage. Important for its language and for its combination of prose and poetry, the book's central theme is wifely obedience.

The work survives in three 15th-century manuscripts, plus one 16th-century one, from well after printing became common. But it was never printed until the 19th century, suggesting a relatively limited popularity.

Le Ménagier de Paris was first edited and published in print form as "traité de morale et d'économie domestique" by Baron Jérôme Pichon in 1846. The book was made available in English translation in its entirety only in 2009, translated and edited by Gina L. Greco & Christine M. Rose and published by Cornell University Press; until that publication, the most complete translation in English was Eileen Power's 1928 The Goodman of Paris. The fact that the "translation was out of print and permission to photocopy it ... could not be obtained" inspired the 2009 publication.

Since earlier translations and editions have focused mainly on the recipes, the book is often incorrectly referred to as a medieval cookbook or an "advice and household hints book," and mined for the history of medieval cuisine. But the book's section of horticulture (some ten pages in printed editions) is also an exceptionally rare glimpse into the medieval gardens of those below the castle-owning class. The other sections give insight into other aspects of French medieval life.

== Format ==
The book contains three main sections: how to attain the love of God and husband; how to "increase the prosperity of the household"; and how to amuse, socialize, and make conversation. Like many medieval texts, the argument relies heavily on exempla and authoritative texts to make its point; included are selections from and references to such tales and characters as Griselda and the tale of Melibee (known in English from Chaucer's "The Clerk's Prologue and Tale" and "The Tale of Melibee"), Lucretia, and Susanna.

The Cornell University Press edition divides the actual text into 21 sections, starting with "The Good Wife's Guide: The English Text of Le Ménagier de Paris", "Prologue", and "Introductory Note to Articles 1.1-1.3", then followed by the rest of the articles translated from the original source.

== Culinary advice ==
The second section of the book, article five, contains the cookbook. Like most of the original resources on medieval cuisine (that is to say, books and manuscripts actually written in the medieval period), its many recipes include information on ingredients and preparation methods, but are short on quantifying anything; most ingredients are given without specifying amounts, and most cooking methods are listed, without specifying amount of heat and time of cooking.

Since this is a standard limitation on references of this type, modern scholars will often attempt extrapolation or trial-and-error experimentation to produce a redaction of the recipe. When working with cookbooks, a "redaction" is generally a recipe, using the methods and ingredients of the original, that the modern author/scholar believes will produce a faithful (and, it is to be hoped, edible) reproduction of the product the original cook would have produced.

== Remedies ==
As is common for cookbooks from early historical period authors, many of the recipes are provided as remedies for common complaints. This is due to the crossover, in medieval works, between herbalism, medicine, and cooking; at times, there appears to be no real difference between them, as books for cooking will include information on herbalism and medicine, and vice versa, to the point where it is hard to determine, at times, which of the above was the primary purpose of the book.

== Recipes ==
Le Menagier includes a variety of different types of recipes: soups, preparations for meats, eggs, fish, sauces, beverages, pastry, tarts, and so on. It has the earliest known complete recipe for bochet, a type of mead made with caramelized honey.

== Other important medieval books about European gastronomy ==
- Llibre de Sent Soví
- Libre del Coch
- Com tayllaràs devant un senyor
- The Forme of Cury
- Du fait de cuisine
- Domostroy

== Other household guides ==
In their introduction, Gina L. Greco and Christine M. Rose mention that Le Ménagier de Paris is "the only surviving medieval book with this amalgamation of instructional materials", and while "other medieval texts of household books, conduct manuals, or hunting treatises resemble this book in some ways, ... none provide just such a comprehensive program of education." This is not entirely true, however, as the Russian household guide, Domostroy, (while believed to originate from 16th century, the source can still be traced to the 15th) likewise addresses the topics of family, marriage, servitude, and cooking in a manner that resembles that of Le Ménagier.

== See also ==
- Medieval cuisine
- List of medieval cookbooks
- Apicius
- The Closet of the Eminently Learned Sir Kenelme Digbie Kt. Opened
