= Kulu =

Kulu or KULU may refer to:

== Places ==
- Kullu, also spelled Kulu, a town in the state of Himachal Pradesh, India
- Kulu, Iran, a village in Lorestan Province
- Kulu, Nigeria, a village - see List of villages in Ogun State
- Kulu, Konya, a town in Konya Province, Turkey
- Kulu, Nallıhan, a village in Ankara Province, Turkey
- Kulu, Suluova, a village in Amasya Province, Turkey
- Kulu (river), Russia

== People ==
- Kulū Isfandiyār (died 1361), king of the Sarbadars from 1346 to 1347
- Kulu Ferreira (born 1959), South African former rugby union player
- Kulu Yahaya (born 1976), Ghanaian footballer

== Other uses ==
- Kulu language, a Benue-Congo language of Nigeria
- Kulu makası (Kulu junction), where State road D.715 (Turkey) merges with State road D.750
- KULU, former callsign of KCRX-FM, a radio station licensed to Seaside, Oregon, United States

== See also ==
- Kulu Vase, a Buddhist goblet in the British Museum
- Pericopsis laxiflora, a deciduous shrub or tree known as Kulu Kulu in some regions
- Kullu (disambiguation)
- Kulus (disambiguation)
