= Kaljo =

Male given name

- Gender: Male
- Language: Estonian
- Name day: August 3 (Estonia)

Origin
- Region of origin: Estonia

Other names
- Related names: Kalju

Kaljo is an Estonian masculine given name and, less commonly, a surname.

People named Kaljo include:

As a given name

- Kaljo Ellik (1948–2017), Estonian politician
- Kaljo Kiisk (1925–2007), Estonian actor, film director and politician.
- Kaljo Põllu (1934–2010), Estonian artist.
- Kaljo Pork (1930-1981), Estonian botanist.
- Kaljo Raag (1892–1967), Estonian weightlifter, actor and singer.
- Kaljo Raid (1921–2005), Estonian composer, cellist and pastor.

As a surname

- Dimitri Kaljo (born 1928), Estonian geologist and palaeontologist
- Julius Kaljo (1910–1954), Estonian footballer.
