= Chouchen =

Alcoholic beverage

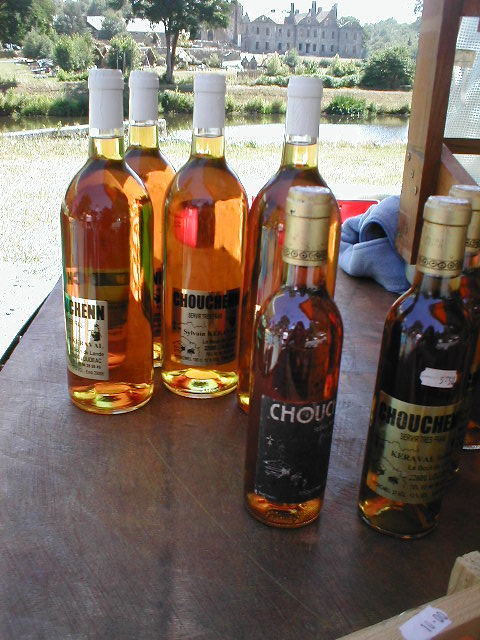
Chouchen

Chouchen (Breton: chouchenn) is an alcoholic beverage native to Brittany. A form of mead, it is made from the fermentation of honey in water. Chouchen normally contains 14% alcohol by volume. Traditionally, buckwheat honey is used, and this imparts chouchen's strong colour and pronounced flavour.

In Brittany, the fermentation process is begun by the addition of freshly pressed apple juice. Yeasts can also be used, as in the beer-making process. To reach the required alcoholic strength, for a litre of chouchen, approximately a third of a litre of honey is needed.

Chouchen is drunk chilled (though without ice), and generally as an aperitif. It can also be added to melon, in a similar way to port wine, or as a hot wine in the winter. There are different kinds of chouchen in Brittany, some of which are prepared with a mixture of seawater as well as fresh water and honey.

Originally chouchen was made of cider and honey. The historical reputation of chouchen as a powerful intoxicant arises partly from claims that its effects were boosted by the venom of bees that became mixed up in the brew. Bees and their venom are not ingredients of the modern product.

There is another drink similar to chouchen, called chufere, which is made of honey and cider. It is generally of a lower strength in alcohol than chouchen, typically eight to nine percent alcohol by volume, and has become less popular and less common than chouchen.
