= Medovukha =

Slavic honey-based alcoholic beverage

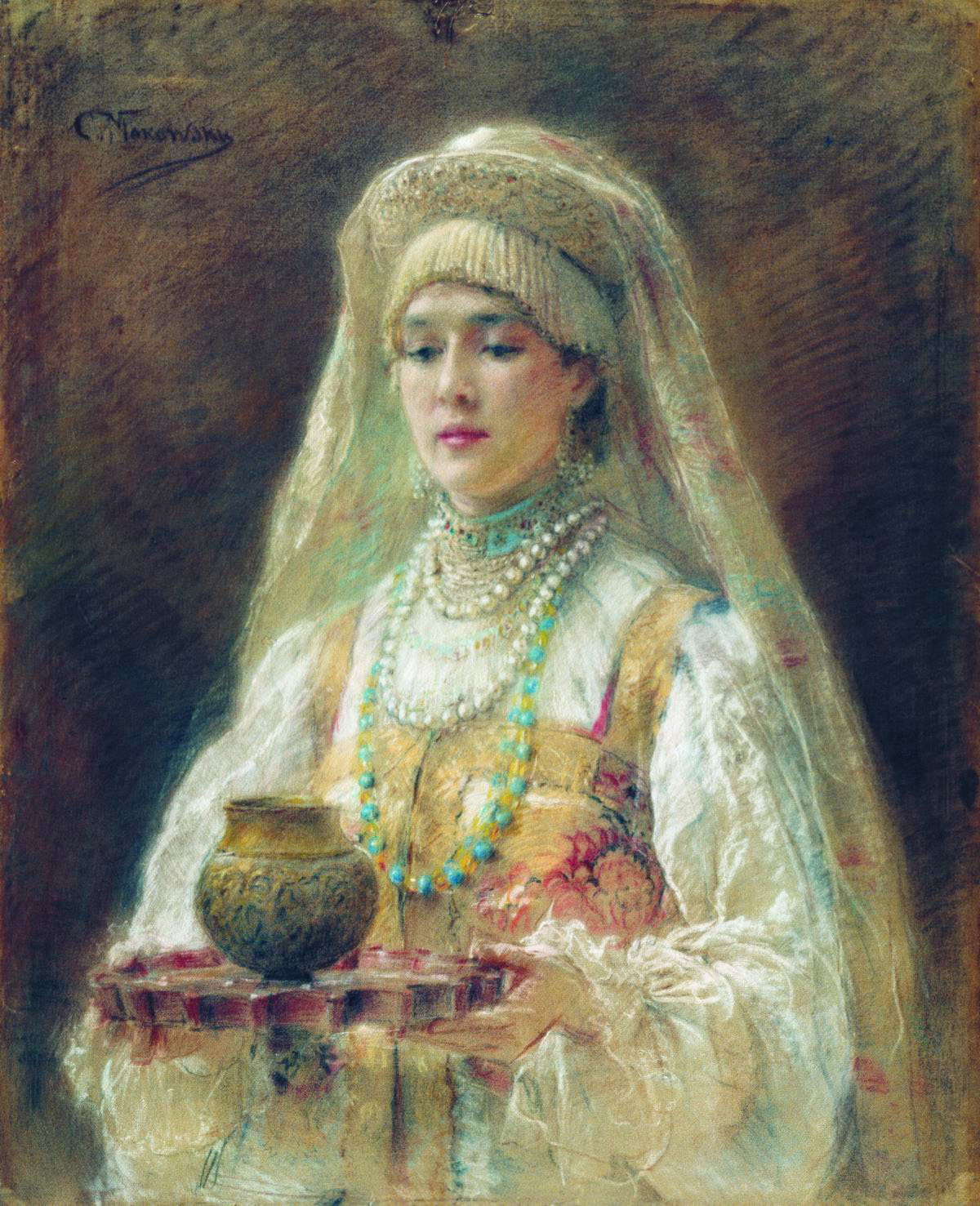
Konstantin Makovsky's painting featuring Medovukha.

Medovukha (Russian: медовуха [mʲɪdɐˈvuxə]; Ukrainian: медуха, romanized: medukha, IPA: [meˈduxɐ]; Belarusian: мядуха, медавуха, romanized: miadúha, miedavúha, IPA: [mʲaˈduxa], [mʲɛdaˈvuxa]) is a Slavic honey-based alcoholic beverage. It is crafted by fermenting honey with water and is sometimes flavored with ingredients such as herbs or berries. While very similar to mead, medovukha is produced much faster (approx. less than 1 month of fermentation).

The words mead and medovukha are closely related and go back to the Proto-Indo-European word *médʰu (honey). Produced in Eastern Europe since pagan times, it remained popular well into the 19th century (unlike in Western Europe, where by the Middle Ages mead had already been mostly replaced by wine and beer).

== History and manufacture ==
Wild honey farming was one of the first Slavic trades. They discovered that honey could be fermented, and the first fermented honey appeared as a luxury product in Europe, where it was imported in huge quantities.

Fermentation occurs naturally over 15 to 50 years, originally rendering the product very expensive and only accessible to the nobility. However, Slavs found that fermentation occurred much faster when the honey mixture was heated, enabling medovukha to become a folk drink in the territory of Kievan Rus'.

== See also ==
- List of Russian dishes
