= Kallum (given name) =

Kallum is a given name. Notable people with the name include:

- Kallum Higginbotham (born 1989), British footballer
- Kallum Mantack (born 1998), British footballer
- Kallum Watkins (1991), British rugby league footballer

== See also ==
- Callum
- Kallu (name)
