= Kalju (given name) =

Estonian male given name

- Gender: Male
- Language: Estonian
- Name day: 3 August

Origin
- Region of origin: Estonia

Other names
- Related names: Kaljo

Kalju (meaning "cliff") is an Estonian-language male given name.

People named Kalju include:

- Kalju Jurkatamm (1941–2024), Estonian sprinter and hurdler
- Kalju Kangur (1925–1989), Estonian writer and translator
- Kalju Karask (1931–2011), Estonian opera and operetta singer and actor
- Kalju Koha (born 1956), Estonian politician
- Kalju Komissarov (1946–2017), Estonian actor
- Kalju Kruusa (1973–2026), Estonian poet, editor and translator
- Kalju Lepik, (1920–1999), Estonian poet
- Kalju Mätik (1932–2019), Estonian freedom fighter, Soviet dissident
- Kalju Ojaste (born 1961), Estonian biathlete
- Kalju Orro (born 1952), Estonian actor
- Kalju Pitksaar (1931–1995), Estonian chess player
- Kalju Põldvere (1929–2011), Estonian zoologist, medical doctor, educator and politician
- Kalju Reitel (1921–2004), Estonian sculptor
- Kalju Suur (1928–2013), Estonian photographer
- Kalju Teras (1922–1990), Estonian educator
- Kalju Tonuma, (born 1970), Australian audio artist
