= Bochet =

Type of mead

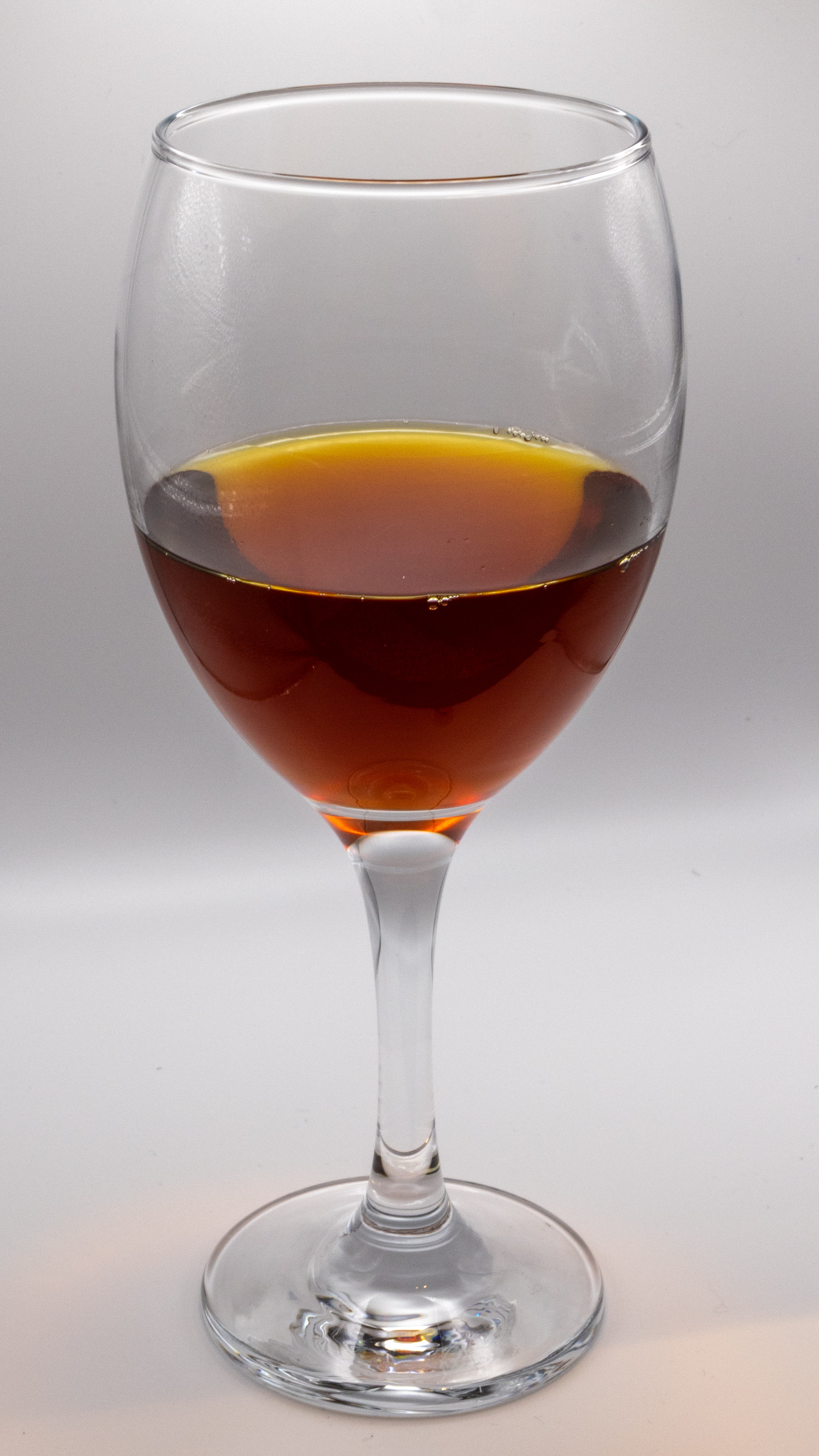
Glass of bochet

Bochet is a type of mead made from honey that has been caramelized. The earliest known complete recipe for bochet is in the 1393 French book Le Ménagier de Paris. It became newly popular when a translation of the book was published in 2009.

Bochetomel is a bochet-style mead that also contains fruit such as elderberries, black raspberries, and blackberries.
