= Kallur Subba Rao =

Indian politician

Member of Constituent Assembly of India

Personal details
- Born: 25 May 1897 Kallur, Anantapur district
- Died: 20 December 1973 (aged 76)
- Party: Indian National Congress

Kallur Subba Rao was an Indian freedom activist and politician. He was a teacher by profession and scholar in Telugu and kannada

He was born in Kallur near Hindupur Taluk, Anantapur District. His Father's name was Sri Surappa and his mother's name was Smt Puttamma. Kallur Subba Rao was born on 25 May 1897, and was the first person to start the Congress Movement in Rayalaseema. He studied up to 12th standard. When Subba Rao was 17-year-old, he attended a meeting hosted by Annie Besant. Thereafter, he started participating in other such meetings and became an active member of Indian Freedom Struggle. He was imprisoned for 7 years as a freedom fighter. After Indian independence, he was elected as a Member of Constituent Assembly of India from Madras Presidency. Afterwards, he was awarded Padma Shri in 1967.

He was a great poet and a very good orator. Rutherford, the then collector of Anantapur District, used to call him the "Lion of Congress". Dr. Rajendra Prasad used to call him the "Prison Graduate" because Subba Rao was a great reader of Bhagavad Gita, Ramayana and Bhagavatha.

He was elected as a Member of Legislative Assembly three times. He was an Andhra Pradesh Congress Committee (APCC) General Secretary.

He died on 20 December 1973. A Special Cover on Sri Kalluri Subba Rao was released in Hindupur Division by Andhra Pradesh Postal Circle on 18.12.2021.
