= Kallu (name) =

Kallu is a Finnish masculine given name that is a form of Kalle. Notable people with this name include the following:

== Given name ==
- Kallu Chidambaram (1948–2015), Indian film actor
- Kallu Dhani Ram (born 1923), Fijian trade unionist

== Surname ==
- Malik Muhammad Waris Kallu, Pakistani politician
- Shamsur Rahman Kallu, Pakistani intelligence official

== See also ==
- Kallu (disambiguation)
- Kall (disambiguation)
- Kalla (name)
- Kalle
- Kalli (name)
- Kallum (given name)
- Kallur (disambiguation)
- Kalju (disambiguation)
- Kalu (name)
- Kullu (disambiguation)
