= Kullu (disambiguation) =

Kullu is a town in Himachal Pradesh, India.

Kullu may also refer to:

- Kullu district, Himachal Pradesh, India; centered on the town
  - Kullu language, the Indo-Aryan language spoken there
- Küllü, Ulus, a village in Bartın Province, Turkey
- Jyoti Sunita Kullu (born 1978), Indian field hockey player

== See also ==
- Kulu (disambiguation)
- Kallu (name)
