= Midus =

Lithuanian alcoholic drink

Midus is a type of Lithuanian mead, an alcoholic beverage made of grain, honey and water. Balts were making mead for thousands of years. Old Lithuanian mead was made from a solution of honey and water simmered with various spices, such as thyme, lemon, cinnamon, cherries, linden blossoms, juniper berries, and hops. Today Midus is produced by several companies and is to be found in the majority of liquor shops in the US and supermarkets in Lithuania.
