= Kallu =

Kallu may refer to:

- Kallu (film), a 1988 Indian Telugu-language film
- Kallu (name)
- Kallu, Iran, or Kali, a village in Dowlatabad Rural District, Zanjan Province
- Palm wine, or kallu, an Asian beverage made from palm tree sap
- Kallu, a character in the 2019 Indian animated TV series Chacha Chaudhary

== See also ==
- Kallur (disambiguation)
