= Muratina =

Traditional honey wine

- Traditional Muratina brewer filtering Muratina
- Type: Mead
- Origin: Kenya
- Colour: Yellow
- Ingredients: Honey, water, Kigelia

Muratina (from Kikuyu: Muratina, Embu: Muratina or Karuvu, Meru: Murigi, Kamba: Kaluvu) is a traditional honey wine, a type of mead, from the Mount Kenya region of Kenya. It is often made at home and is brewed from honey, water and the fruit of a medicinal tree called Kigelia (Kigelia africana). It has a characteristic honey aroma and the colour ranges from golden to dark amber, depending on the type of honey used for production.
