= Kabarawan =

Traditional pre-colonial Filipino mead-like alcoholic drink

- Type: Mead
- Origin: Philippines, Visayas

Kabarawan was a traditional pre-colonial Filipino mead-like alcoholic drink. It was made from boiling the ground up aromatic bark of the kabarawan tree (Neolitsea villosa) until it was reduced to a thick paste. It was then mixed with an equal amount of honey and fermented. It was traditionally consumed from jars with reed or bamboo straws. The wine was mentioned by early Spanish colonists as being made by the Visayan people. However, the tradition has been lost in modern times. Kabarawan tree bark is also used to flavor other types of native wines, like intus and basi, which are both made from sugarcane juice.

== See also ==
- Bais
- Mead
- Sima
