= Mead =

Alcoholic beverage made from honey

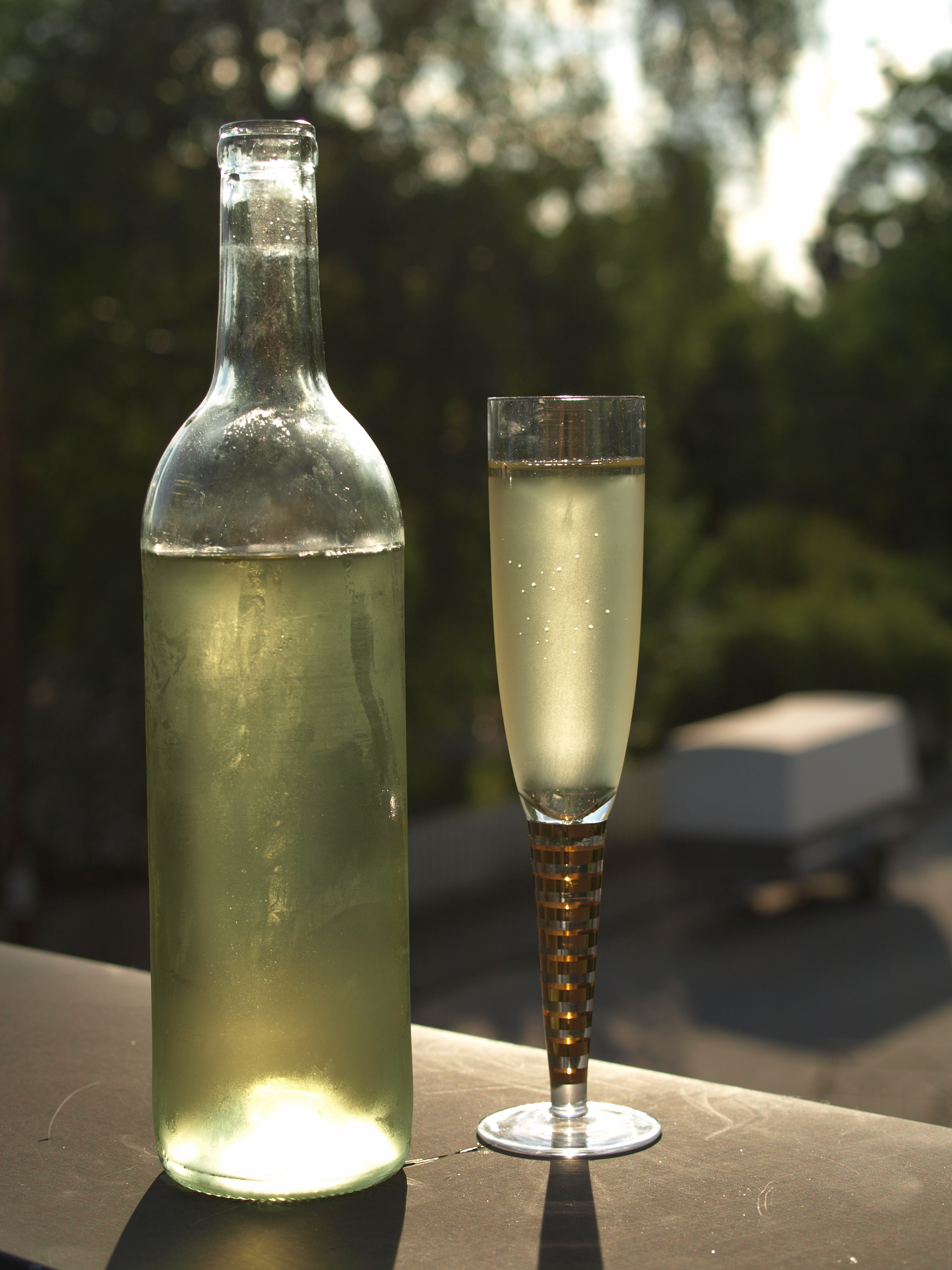
- Swedish elderflower-flavored mead.
- Type: fermented beverage
- Alcohol by volume: 3.5–20.5%
- Proof (US): 7°–41°
- Colour: pale yellow
- Flavour: dry, sweet or semi-sweet
- Ingredients: honey, water, fruit, herbs, spices
- Variants: metheglyn, chouchen, bochet
- Related products: tej, midus, medovukha, bais, balché, muratina

Mead (/miːd/, MEED), also called honey wine, and hydromel (particularly when low in alcohol content), is an alcoholic beverage made by fermenting honey mixed with water, and sometimes with added ingredients such as fruits, spices, grains, or hops. The alcoholic content ranges from about 3.5% ABV to more than 20%. Possibly the oldest alcoholic drink, mead is defined by the fact that most of its fermentable sugar comes from honey. It may be still, carbonated, or naturally sparkling, and although many people think mead is always sweet, it can also be dry or semi-sweet.

Mead that also contains spices is called metheglin (/mɪˈθɛɡlɪn/), and mead that contains fruit is called melomel. The term honey wine is sometimes used as a synonym for mead, although wine is typically defined to be the product of fermented grapes or certain other fruits, and some cultures have honey wines that are distinct from mead. The honey wine of Hungary, for example, is the fermentation of honey-sweetened pomace of grapes or other fruits.

Mead was produced in ancient times throughout Europe, Africa, and Asia, and has played an important role in the mythology of some peoples, which sometimes ascribed magical or supernatural powers to it. In Norse mythology, for example, the Mead of Poetry, crafted from the blood of Kvasir, would turn anyone who drank it into a poet or scholar.

== History ==
Mead was possibly discovered among the first humans 20,000–40,000 years ago prior to the advent of both agriculture and ceramic pottery in the Neolithic, due to the prevalence of naturally occurring fermentation and the distribution of eusocial honey-producing insects worldwide; as a result, it is hard to pinpoint the exact historical origin of mead given the possibility of multiple discovery or potential knowledge transfer between early humans prior to recorded history. With the eventual rise of ceramic pottery and increasing use of fermentation in food processing to preserve surplus agricultural crops, evidence of mead begins to show up in the archaeological record more clearly, with pottery vessels from northern China dating from at least 7000 BCE discovered containing chemical signatures consistent with the presence of honey, rice, and organic compounds associated with fermentation.

The earliest surviving written record of mead is possibly the soma mentioned in the hymns of the Rigveda, one of the sacred books of the historical Vedic religion and (later) Hinduism dated around 1700–1100 BCE. The Rigveda predates the Indo-Iranian separation, dated to roughly 2000 BCE, so this mention may originate from the Western Steppe or Eastern Europe. The Abri, a northern Illyrian subgroup of the Taulantii, were known to the ancient Greek writers for their technique of preparing mead from honey. During the Golden Age of ancient Greece, mead was said to be the preferred drink. Aristotle (384–322 BCE) discussed mead made in Illiria in his Meteorologica and elsewhere, while Pliny the Elder (23–79 CE) used the name melitites in his Naturalis Historia for a grape and honey wine (Pliny, Bk 4, Ch. 9, Sec. 11). The Hispanic-Roman naturalist Lucius Columella gave a recipe for mead (mella or aqua mulsa, lit. 'honeyed water') in De re rustica, about 60 CE.

Take rainwater kept for several years, and mix a sextarius of this water with a [Roman] pound of honey. For a weaker mead, mix a sextarius of water with nine ounces of honey. The whole is exposed to the sun for 40 days and then left on a shelf near the fire. If you have no rain water, then boil spring water.

Ancient Greek writer Pytheas described a grain-and-honey drink similar to mead that he encountered while traveling in Thule. According to James Henry Ramsay this was an earlier version of Welsh metheglin. When 12-year-old Prince Charles II visited Wales in 1642, Welsh metheglin was served at the feast as a symbol of Welsh presence in the emerging British identity in the years between the Union of the Crowns in 1603 and the creation of the Kingdom of Great Britain in 1707.

A mention of "meodu scencu" (mead-cup) in Beowulf

A poem attributed to the Welsh bard Taliesin, who lived around 550 CE, is called Kanu y med or "Song of Mead" (Cân y medd). The legendary drinking, feasting, and boasting of warriors in the mead hall is echoed in the mead hall Din Eidyn (modern-day Edinburgh) as depicted in the poem Y Gododdin, attributed to the poet Aneirin, who would have been a contemporary of Taliesin. In the Old English epic poem Beowulf, the Danish warriors drank mead. In both Insular Celtic and Germanic poetry, mead was the primary drink associated with heroes and deities; see, for example, the Mead of poetry.

Mead (Old Irish mid) was a popular drink in medieval Ireland. Beekeeping was brought around the 5th century, traditionally attributed to Modomnoc, and mead came with it. A banquet hall on the Hill of Tara was known as Tech Mid Chuarda ("house of the circling of mead"). Mead was often infused with hazelnuts. Many other legends of saints mention mead, as does that of the Children of Lir.

Later, other alcoholic beverages increasingly displaced mead because their required fermentable sugars were less expensive and more readily available; combined with taxation and regulations governing alcoholic beverage ingredients, this made commercial mead relatively obscure until recently. Some monasteries kept up the traditions of mead-making as a by-product of beekeeping, especially in areas where grapes could not be grown.

Since the turn of the 21st century, mead production has experienced a global renaissance. According to MeadWorld, at least 850 commercial mead producers operated worldwide as of 2025.

== Etymology ==
The English mead – "fermented honey drink" – derives from the Old English meodu or medu, and Proto-Indo-European language, *médʰu. Its cognates include Old Norse mjǫðr, Proto-Slavic medъ, Middle Dutch mede, and Old High German metu, Sanskrit madhu and the ancient Irish queen Medb, among others. The Chinese word for honey, mì (蜜) is from the word mit, which was borrowed from the extinct Indo-European Tocharian B – and is also cognate with the English word mead.

The unrelated homonym mead (a water mead, i.e. meadow) is from a different root, OE mǣd, so that any supposed relation due to the tint of meadow water is coincidental folk etymology.

== Resurgence ==
Mead is experiencing a massive global resurgence. Consumers are shifting toward unique, natural alternatives to traditional beer and wine, driven by the popularity of "session meads" (lower-alcohol, carbonated styles) and craft brewing innovations. In Hong Kong, it is one of the few alcoholic drinks that can be brewed with local ingredients; 'we're preserving a bit of Hong Kong culture,' one maker says. In the Philippines, brands like La Mesa Mead are creating meads with tropical elements.

== Fermentation process ==
Meads often ferment at the same temperatures as wine, and mead-making yeast is often identical to that used in wine making (particularly white wines).

By measuring the specific gravity of the mead before and during fermentation with a hydrometer or refractometer, mead makers can determine the alcohol-by-volume in the final product.

With many different mead styles, producers use various processes, though most use techniques recognizable from wine-making, including racking into another container for a secondary fermentation. Some larger commercial producers allow primary and secondary fermentation in the same vessel. Racking serves two purposes: it lets the mead sit away from dead yeast cells (lees) and gives them time to clear. Cloudiness can be caused by yeast, or suspended protein molecules. The pectin from any fruit that is used can also give the mead a cloudy look. The cloudiness can be cleared up by either "cold breaking", leaving the mead in a cold environment overnight, or by using a fining material such as sparkolloid, bentonite, egg white, or isinglass. If the mead-maker wishes to back sweeten the product (that is, add supplementary sweetener) or prevent it from oxidizing, potassium metabisulfite and potassium sorbate are added. After the mead clears, it is bottled and distributed.

Primary fermentation usually takes 28 to 56 days, after which the must is placed in a secondary fermentation vessel for 6 to 9 months of aging. Length of primary and secondary fermentation can vary considerably due to numerous factors, such as floral origin of the honey and its natural sugar and microorganism contents, must water percentage, pH, additives used, and strain of yeast, among others. Although supplementation of the must with non-nitrogen based salts, or vitamins has been tested to improve mead qualities, evidence suggests that adding micronutrients does not reduce fermentation time or improved quality when using dark honey varieties, which can often be naturally rich in micronutrients. Cell immobilization methods, however, proved effective for enhancing mead quality across multiple honey varieties.

== Varieties ==
Mead can have a wide range of flavors depending on the source of the honey, additives (also known as "adjuncts" or "gruit"), including fruit and spices, the yeast employed during fermentation, and the aging procedure. Some producers have erroneously marketed white wine sweetened and flavored with honey after fermentation as mead, sometimes spelling it "meade." Some producers ferment a blend of honey and other sugars, such as white refined sugar, again, mislabeling the product as mead. This style is closer to a hypocras. Blended varieties of mead may be known by the style they represent; for instance, a mead made with cinnamon and apples may be called either a cinnamon metheglin or an apple cyser.

A mead that also contains spices (such as cloves, cinnamon or nutmeg), or herbs (such as meadowsweet, hops, or even lavender or chamomile), is called a metheglin /mɪˈθɛɡlɪn/.

A mead that contains fruit (such as raspberry, blackberry, or strawberry) is called a melomel, which was also used as a means of food preservation, keeping summer produce for the winter. A mead that is fermented with grape juice is called a pyment.

Mulled mead is a popular drink at Christmas time, where mead is flavored with spices (and sometimes various fruits) and warmed, traditionally by having a hot poker plunged into it.

Some meads retain some measure of the sweetness of the original honey, and some may even be considered as dessert wines. Drier meads are also available, and some producers offer sparkling meads.

Historically, meads were fermented with wild yeast and bacteria (as noted in the recipe quoted above) that lived on fruit skins or in the honey itself. Wild yeasts can produce inconsistent results. Yeast companies have isolated yeast strains that produce consistently appealing products. Brewers, winemakers, and mead makers commonly use them for fermentation, including strains identified specifically for mead. These strains are selected for their ability to preserve delicate honey flavors and aromas.

Mead can also be distilled to brandy or liqueur strength, in which case it is sometimes called whiskey. A version called "honey jack" can be made by partly freezing a quantity of mead and straining the ice out of the liquid (a process known as freeze distillation), in the same way that applejack is made from cider.

=== Regional variants ===
In Finland, a sweet mead called sima is connected with the Finnish vappu festival (although in modern practice, brown sugar is often used in place of honey). During secondary fermentation, added-raisins increase the sugar available to the yeast and signal readiness for consumption, rising to the top of the bottle when depleted. Sima is commonly served with both the pulp and rind of a lemon.

An Ethiopian mead variant tej (ጠጅ, [ˈtʼədʒ]) is usually home-made and flavored with the powdered leaves and bark of gesho, a hop-like bittering agent which is a species of buckthorn. A sweeter, less-alcoholic version (honey-water) called berz, aged for a shorter time, is also made.

In Kenya, a mead variant called Muratina is usually homemade and used during many important religious and social events.

Mead in Poland and Ireland have been part of culinary tradition for over a thousand years.

Mead has been made in the United Kingdom for thousands of years by fermenting honey with water, fruits, and spices. Monasteries created mead as a byproduct of bee keeping.

In the United States, mead is enjoying a resurgence, starting with small home meaderies and now with a number of small commercial meaderies. As mead becomes more widely available, it is seeing increased attention and exposure from the news media. This resurgence can also be seen around the world in the UK and Australia particularly with session (lower alcohol styles) sometimes called hydromel and mead-beer hybrids also known as braggots.

In the Philippines, local mead makers are also putting mead back on the radar of liquor and alcohol aficionados. To promote mead, the Philippines held its first International Mead Day celebration on 3 August 2024. Mead is also starting to gain popularity due to artisanal bazaars and trade fairs like Artefino and Maarte Fair. Locally produced spirits and liquors including mead from Filipino meaderies such as La Mesa Mead were prominently showcased by organizers. La Mesa Mead is the Philippines' first commercially available Filipino mead. La Mesa Mead was dubbed one of the best things tasted during the Maarte Fair.

=== Mead variants ===
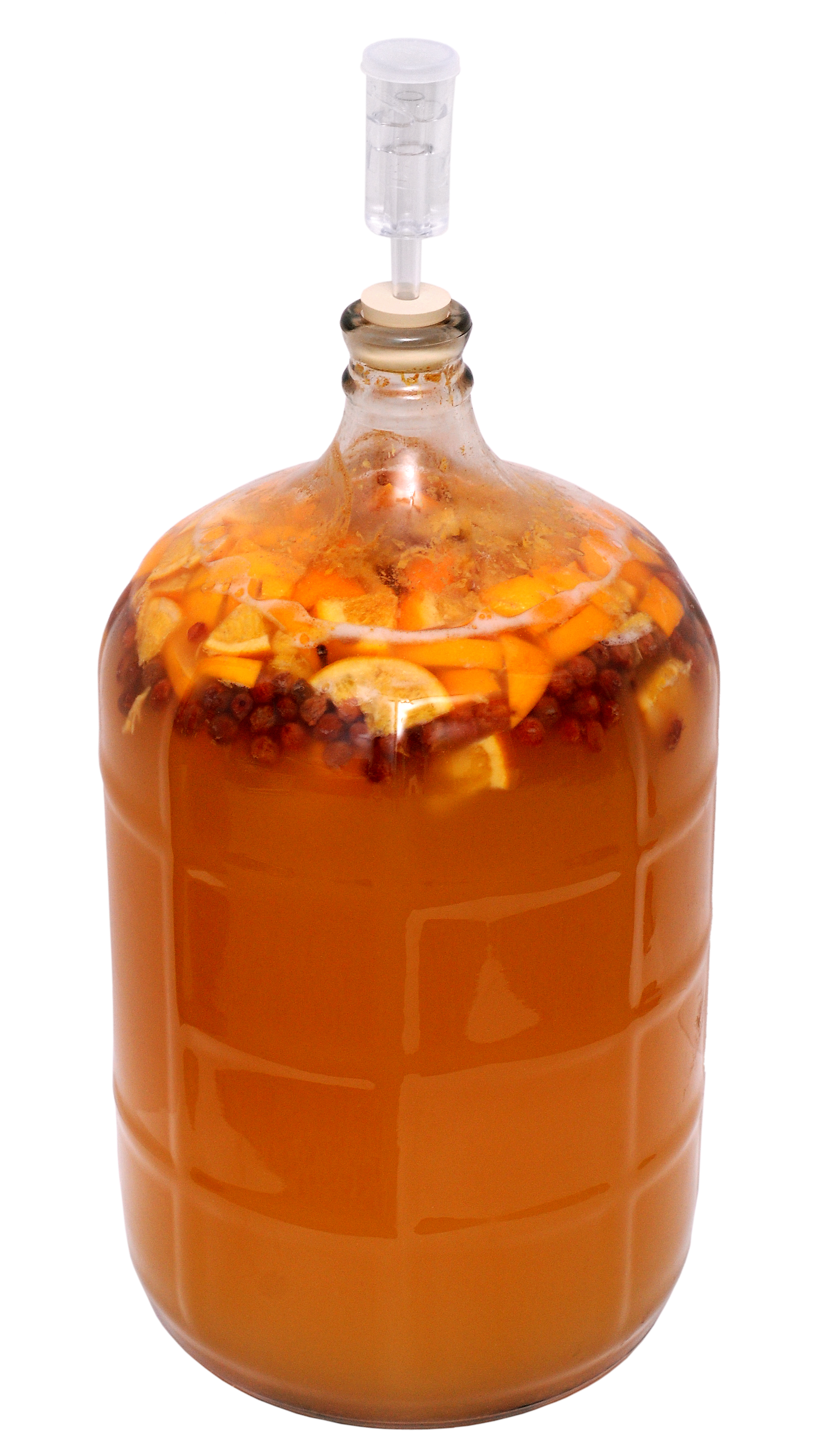
A homebrewed melomel

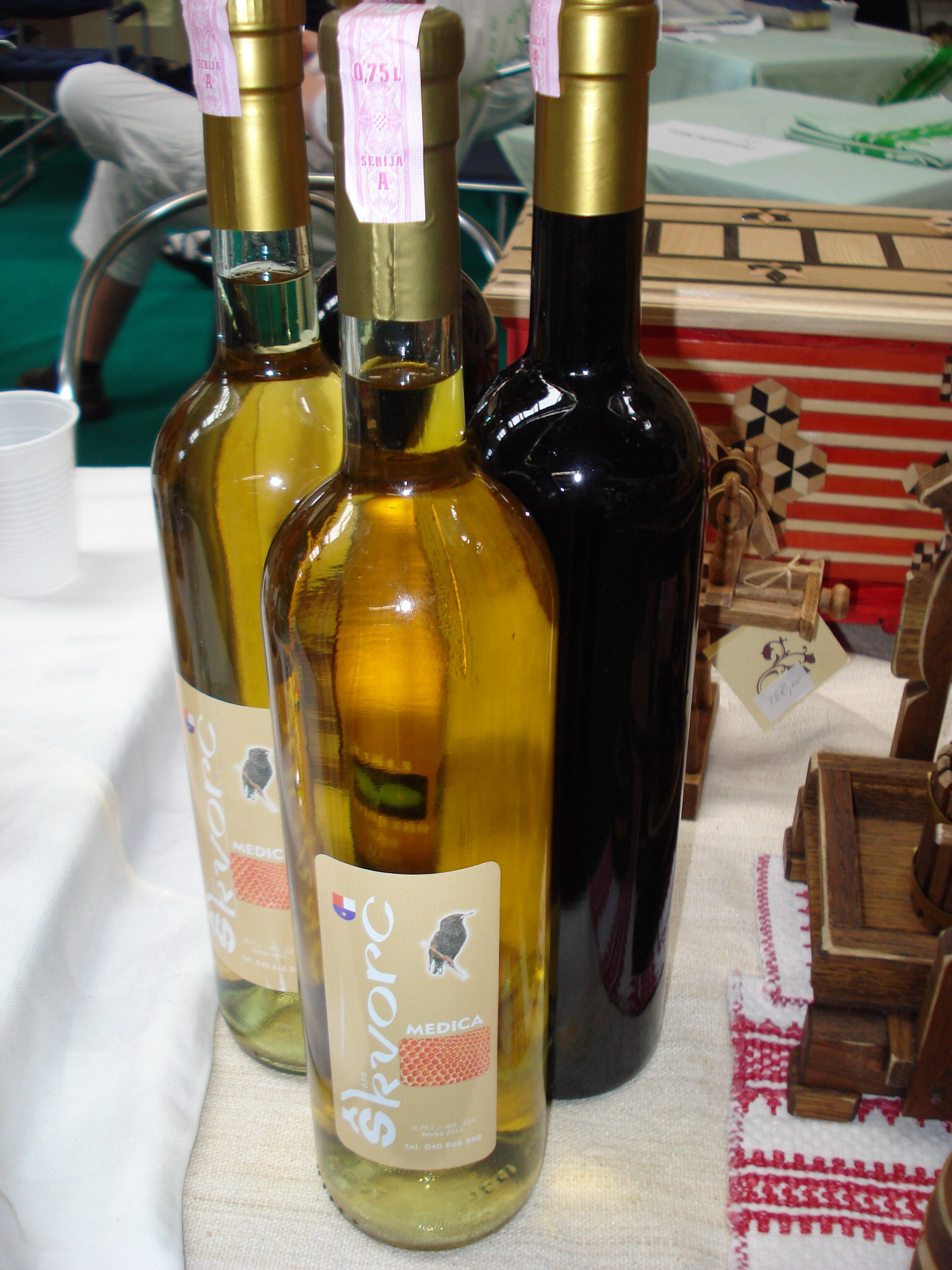
Bottles of "medica" (r.meditsa) – a mead made in Međimurje County, northern Croatia

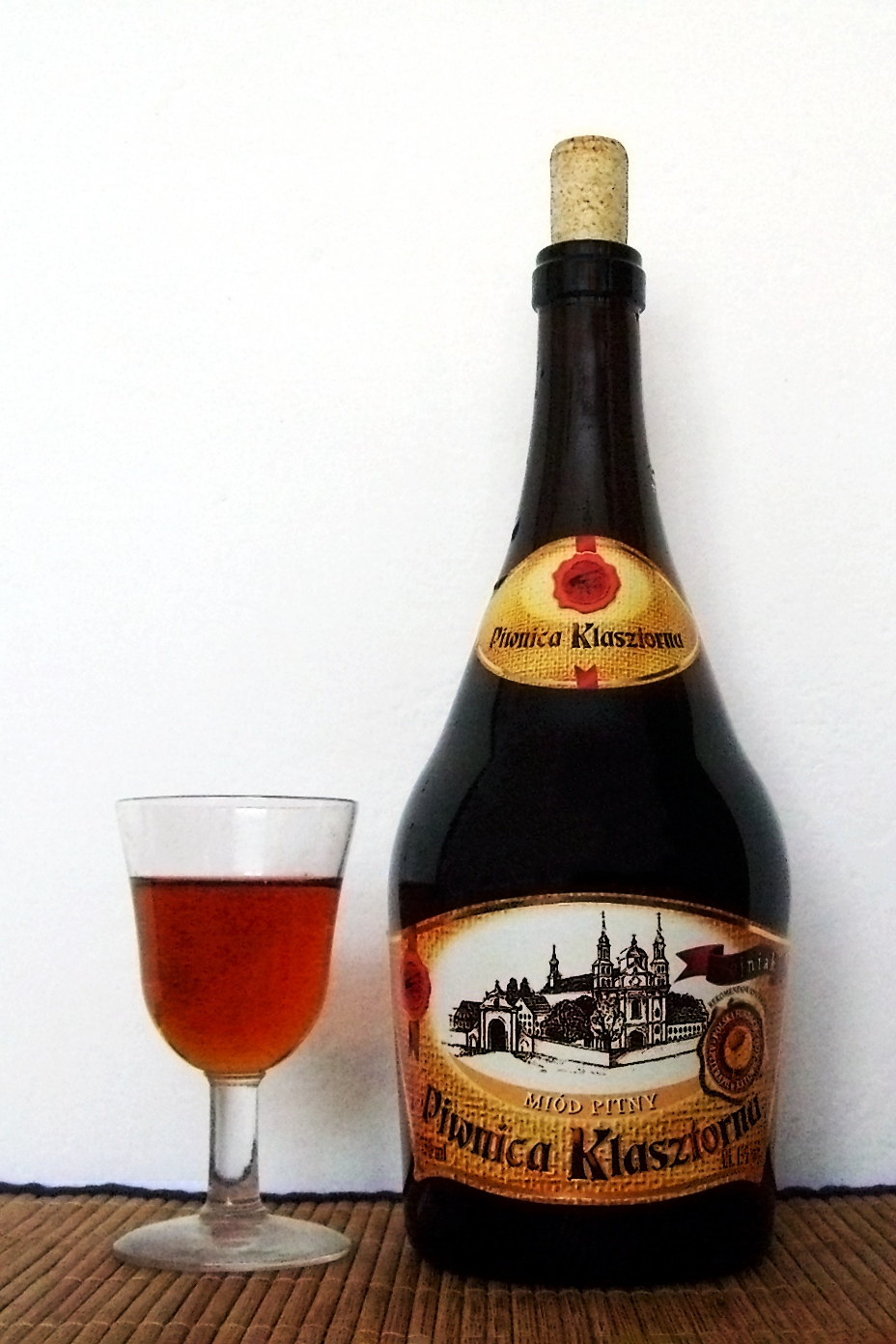
Trójniak – a Polish mead, made using two units of water for each unit of honey

- Acerglyn: A mead made with honey and maple syrup.
- Bais: A native mead from the Mandaya and Manobo people of eastern Mindanao in the Philippines. It is made from honey and water, fermented for at least five days, up to a month or more.
- Balché: A native Mexican version of mead.
- Bilbemel: A melomel mead made with blueberries, blueberry juice, or sometimes used for a varietal mead that uses blueberry blossom honey.
- Black mead: A name was sometimes given to the blend of honey and blackcurrants.
- Blue mead: A type of mead where fungal spores are added during the first fermentation, lending a blue tint to the final product.
- Bochet: A mead where the honey is caramelized or burned separately before adding the water. Yields toffee, caramel, chocolate, and toasted marshmallow flavors.
- Bochetomel: A bochet-style mead that also contains fruit such as elderberries, black raspberries, and blackberries.
- Braggot: Also called bragot, brackett, and bragget. Welsh origin (bragawd). A mead made from malt and honey. Hops are an optional ingredient. Contrary to the modern definition, historic braggot was most often a back sweetened spiced ale.
- Byais: A native mead of the Mansaka people of the Philippines made by fermenting galanga roots with honey.
- Capsicumel: A mead flavored with chili peppers; the peppers may be hot or mild.
- Chouchen: A kind of mead made in Brittany. Chouchen (pronounced "shooshen") was originally a mead fermented using cider or apple must. Because the term is unregulated, it now generally refers to mead in Brittany.
- Coffeemel: Mead made with coffee.
- Cyser: A melomel mead made from home honey and apples. If most of the fermentable sugar comes from honey, you get a cyser. If most of the fermentable sugar comes from apples, you get a honey cider.
- Czwórniak (TSG): A Polish mead, made using three units of water for each unit of honey.
- Dandaghare: A mead from Nepal, that combines honey with Himalayan herbs and spices. It has been produced in Pokhara since 1972.
- Dwójniak (TSG): A Polish mead, made using equal amounts of water and honey.
- Gverc or medovina: Croatian mead prepared in Samobor and many other places. The word "gverc" or "gvirc' is from the German "Gewürze" and refers to various spices added to mead.
- Hydromel: Name derived from the Greek hydromeli, i.e. literally "water-honey" (see also melikraton and hydromelon). It is also the French name for mead. (See also and compare with the Italian idromele and Spanish hidromiel and aguamiel, the Catalan hidromel and aiguamel, Galician augamel, and Portuguese hidromel). It is also used to describe light or low-alcohol mead.
- Kabarawan: A pre-colonial alcoholic drink from the Visayas Islands of the Philippines made with honey and the pounded bark of the Neolitsea villosa
- Medica/medovica: Slovenian, Croatian and Slovak variety of mead.
- Medovina: Czech, Croatian, Serbian, Montenegrin, Macedonia,Bulgarian, Bosnian and Slovak for mead. It is commercially available in the Czech Republic, Slovakia, and presumably other Central and Eastern-European countries.
- Medovukha: Eastern Slavic variant (honey-based fermented drink).
- Melomel: A type of mead that also contains fruit.
- Metheglin: Metheglin is traditional mead with herbs or spices added. Some of the most common metheglins are ginger, tea, orange peel, nutmeg, coriander, cinnamon, cloves or vanilla. Its name indicates that many metheglins were originally employed as folk medicines. The Welsh word for mead is medd, and the word "metheglin" derives from meddyglyn, a compound of meddyg, "healing" + llyn, "liquor". In the past, people prepared the drink by mixing honey with an herbal decoction.
- Midus: Lithuanian for mead, made of natural bee honey and berry juice. It is infused with carnation blossoms, acorns, poplar buds, juniper berries, and other herbs. Generally, between 8% and 17% alcohol, it is also distilled to produce mead nectar or mead balsam, with some of the varieties having as much as 75% of alcohol.
- Mõdu: An Estonian traditional fermented drink with a taste of honey and an alcohol content of 4.0%
- Morat: a blend of honey and mulberries.
- Mulsum: Mulsum is not a true mead, but is unfermented honey blended with a high-alcohol wine.
- Mungitch: A party drink made in Western Australia, by Indigenous Noongar using flowers from the moodjar tree (Nuytsia floribunda) are traditionally used to make a sweet mead-like beverage during birak (the first summer in the Indigenous Noongar calendar) the moodjar tree is a very sacred tree to the Noongar peoples.
- Myod: Traditional Russian mead, historically available in three major varieties:
  - Aged mead: a mixture of honey and water or berry juices, subject to a very slow (12–50 years) anaerobic fermentation in airtight vessels in a process similar to the traditional balsamic vinegar, creating a rich, complex, and high-priced product.
  - Boiled mead: a drink closer to beer, brewed from boiled wort of diluted honey and herbs, very similar to modern medovukha.
  - Drinking mead: a kind of honey wine made from diluted honey by traditional fermentation.
- Nectars: Typically fermented to below 6% ABV, they often incorporate other flavors such as fruits, herbs and spices.
- Omphacomel: A mead recipe that blends honey with verjuice; could therefore be considered a variety of pyment (q.v.). From the Greek omphakomeli, literally "unripe-grape-honey".
- Oxymel: Another historical mead recipe, blending honey with wine vinegar. From the Greek ὀξύμελι oxymeli, literally "vinegar-honey" (also oxymelikraton).
- Pitarrilla: Mayan drink made from a fermented mixture of wild honey, balché-tree bark and fresh water.
- Półtorak (TSG): A Polish great mead, made using two units of honey for each unit of water.
- Pyment: a melomel made from the fermentation of a blend of grapes and honey. If most of the fermentable sugars come from honey, it is considered a pyment. If most of the fermentable sugars come from grapes, it is considered a honeyed wine. In previous centuries piment was synonymous with Hippocras, a grape wine with honey added post-fermentation.
- Quick mead: A type of mead recipe that is meant to age quickly, for immediate consumption. Because of its production methods, short mead shares some qualities with cider (or even light ale): it is effervescent and often has a cidery taste. It can also be champagne-like.
- Red mead: A form of mead made with redcurrants.
- Rhodomel: made from honey, water, and flowers. From the Greek ῥοδόμελι rhodomeli, literally "rose-honey". Rose hips, rose petals, or rose attar are most commonly used today, yet historical meads were commonly made with other flowers, such as heather, elderflowers, hibiscus, or dandelion.
- Rubamel: A specific type of melomel made with raspberries.
- Sack mead: This refers to a mead that is made with more honey than is typically used. The finished product contains a higher-than-average ethanol concentration (meads at or above 14% ABV are generally considered to be of sack strength) and often retains a high specific gravity and elevated levels of sweetness, although dry sack meads (which have no residual sweetness) can be produced. According to one theory, the name derives from the fortified dessert wine sherry (which is sometimes sweetened after fermentation) that, in England, once bore the nickname "sack". In Another theory is that the term is a phonetic reduction of "sake" the name of a Japanese beverage that was introduced to the West by Spanish and Portuguese traders. However, this mead is quite sweet, and Shakespeare referenced "sack" in Henry IV, "If sack and sugar be a fault, God help the wicked!", as well as 18th-century cookbooks that reference "sack mead" by authors unlikely to have known nor tasted "sake".
- Short mead: A mead made with less honey than usual and intended for immediate consumption.
- Show mead: A term that has come to mean "plain" mead: that which has honey and water as a base, with no fruits, spices, or extra flavorings. Because honey alone often doesn't provide enough nourishment for the yeast to complete its life cycle, mead devoid of fruit, etc., sometimes requires a special yeast nutrient and other enzymes to produce an acceptable finished product. In most competitions, including all those that subscribe to the BJCP style guidelines, as well as the International Mead Fest, the term "traditional mead" refers to this variety (because mead is historically a variable product, these guidelines are a recent expedient, designed to provide a common language for competition judging; style guidelines per se do not apply to commercial or historical examples of this or any other type of mead).
- Sima: a quick-fermented low-alcoholic Finnish variety, seasoned with lemon and associated with the festival of vappu.
- Tapluch'i: a Georgian name for mead, especially made of honey, but it is also a collective name for any drinkable inebriant.
- Tej/mes: an Ethiopian and Eritrean mead, fermented with wild yeasts and the addition of gesho.
- Traditional mead: synonymous with "show mead," meaning it contains only honey, water, and yeast.
- Trójniak (TSG): A Polish mead, made using two units of water for each unit of honey.
- White mead: A mead that is colored white with herbs, fruit, or, sometimes, egg whites. 17th-century cookery books mention the terms white mead and white metheglin.
- Muratina: A native mead made from the Kikuyu, Embu, Meru and Kamba people of Kenya. It is made by fermenting honey, water, and Kigelia.

== See also ==
- History of alcoholic beverages
- Kilju
- Mead hall
- Sahti
- Sima

== Bibliography ==
- Wilkes, John (1996). The Illyrians. Blackwell Publishers. p. 221. ISBN 978-0-631-14671-1.
