= Palek =

Traditional Filipino alcoholic drink

- Type: Sugarcane wine
- Origin: Philippines, Batanes

Palek, also known as paleg or mineovaheng, is a traditional Filipino alcoholic drink from the Batanes Islands made from fermented sugarcane juice. It is flavored with ebony bark (Diospyros ferrea), which turns the drink black. It is traditionally served in a halved coconut shell and passed from one person to the next.

The Batanes Islands were also named "Bashi" in old European records after palek. It was named by the English explorer William Dampier in 1687 due to the drink being plentiful in the islands, which they called basi, after the name of a similar drink in Northern Luzon.

Their common drink is water; as it is of all other Indians: Besides which they make a sort of drink with the juice of the sugar-cane, which they boil, and put some small black sort of berries among it. When it is well-boiled, they put it into great jars and it is presently fit to drink. This is an excellent liquor, and very much like English Beer, both in colour and taste. It is very strong, and I do believe very wholesome: for our men, who drank briskly of it all the day of several weeks, were frequently drunk with it, and never sick after it. The natives brought a vast deal of it every day to those aboard and ashore: for some of our men were ashore at work on Bashee Island: which island they gave that name to from their drinking this liquor there; that being the name which the natives call'd this liquor by: and as they sold it to our men, very cheap, so they did not spare to drink it as freely. And indeed from the plenty of this liquor, and their plentiful use of it, our Men call'd all these Islands, the Bashee Islands."

— William Dampier, Dampier's Voyages (1906, Vol. 1, p.424)

== See also ==
- Basi
- Intus
