= Kallur, Palakkad =

Kallur
- Village
- Location in Kerala, India Kallur (India)
- Coordinates: 10.8117768°N 76.5110958°E
- Country: India
- State: Kerala
- District: Palakkad

Languages
  - Official: Malayalam, English
- Time zone: UTC+5:30 (IST)
- PIN: 678613
- Vehicle registration: KL-
- Lok Sabha constituency: Palakkad

Kallur is a small village in Palakkad district (erstwhile Palghat) of Kerala, southwest India, which is almost 20 km from Palakkad town and 17 km from Ottappalam.
