= Kallur, Kumbakonam =

Kallur
- village
- Location in Tamil Nadu, India
- Coordinates: 11.020551°N 79.387078°E
- Country: India
- State: Tamil Nadu
- District: Thanjavur

Population (2001)
  - Total: 2,696

Languages
  - Official: Tamil
- Time zone: UTC+5:30 (IST)
- Postal code: 612 503

Kallur is a village in the Kumbakonam taluk of Thanjavur district, Tamil Nadu, India.

== Demographics ==
As per the 2001 census, Kallur had a total population of 2696 with 1322 males and 1374 females. The sex ratio was 1039. The literacy rate was 61.39
