= Kalju, Saare County =

Village in Estonia

Kalju
- Village
- Location in Estonia
- Coordinates: 58°24′10″N 22°50′40″E
- Country: Estonia
- County: Saare County
- Municipality: Saaremaa Parish

Population (2011 Census)
  - Total: 27

Kalju (also known as Kaljuküla) is a village in Saaremaa Parish, Saare County, Estonia, on the island of Saaremaa. As of the 2011 census, the settlement's population was 27.

There's an old wooden Pahna schoolhouse from 1877 located in Kalju village.
