= Kilju =

Finnish home made alcoholic beverage

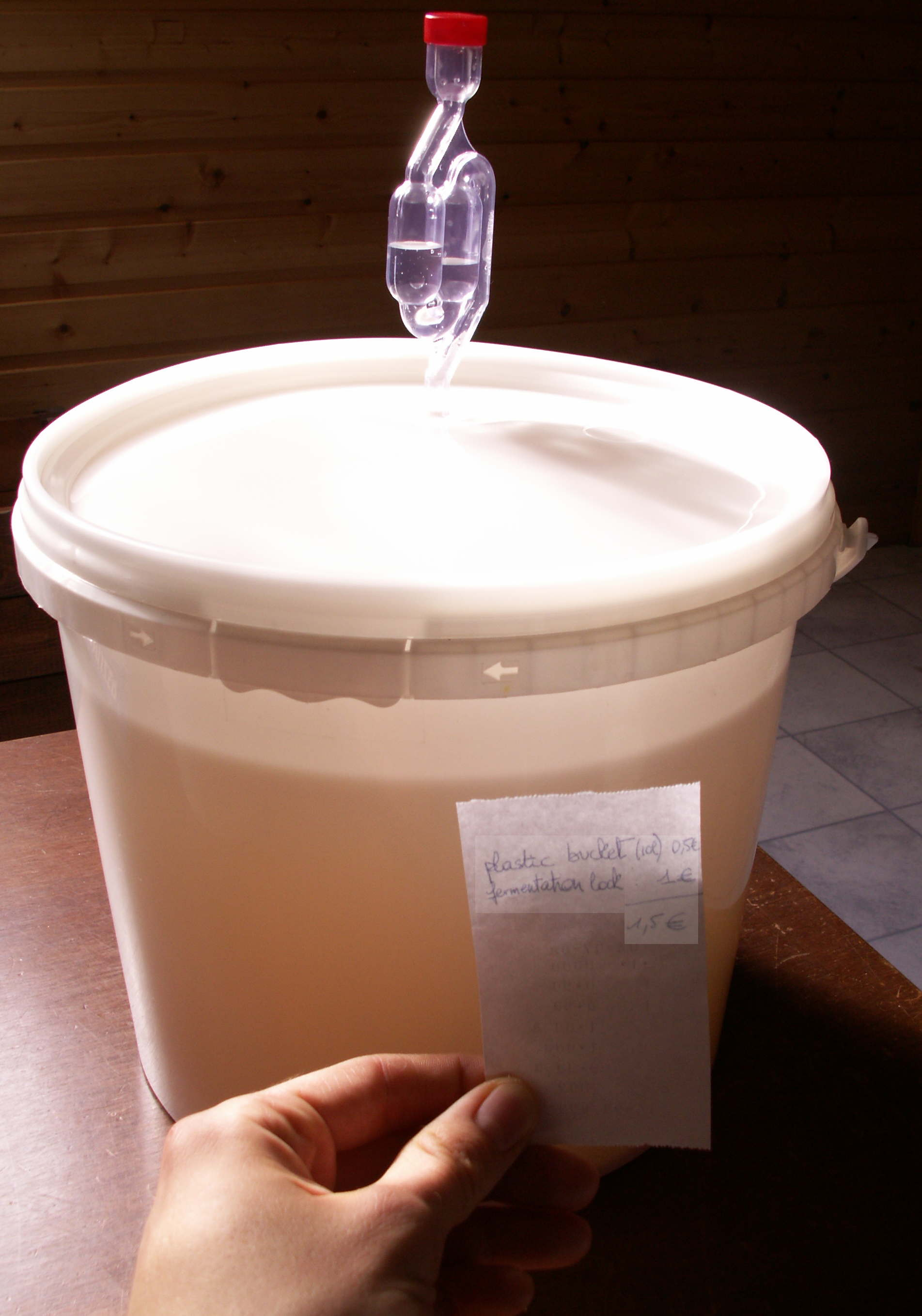
- A picture of kilju in a DIY fermentation vessel with integrated fermentation lock
- Type: Alcoholic beverage
- Origin: Finland, Nationwide
- Introduced: Early 20th century
- Alcohol by volume: 13–15% (typical)
- Color: Flax-colored
- Flavor: Neutral, ethanol-like
- Ingredients: Sugar (or honey), water, yeast

Kilju (Finnish pronunciation: [ˈkilju]) is the Finnish word for a mead-like homemade alcoholic beverage made from a source of carbohydrates (such as cane sugar or honey), yeast, and water, making it both affordable and cheap to produce. The ABV depends on the yeast that was used, and since it does not contain a sweet reserve it is completely dry. Crude product may be distilled into moonshine. Kilju intended for direct consumption is usually clarified and stabilized to avoid wine faults. It is a flax-colored alcoholic beverage with little discernible taste other than that of ethanol. It can be used as an ethanol base for drink mixers.

== Cultural aspects ==
Kilju is commonly associated with the punk subculture.

Kilju has long been part of Finnish alcohol and counterculture, as documented in an old video showing its production and consumption at one of the country’s leading engineering schools. "Four thousand litres of gases are generated. They are led to the neighbours' delight." The drink tends to invite such black humour, of the deadpan kind.

The first commercially produced kilju was introduced in 2022.

== Production ==
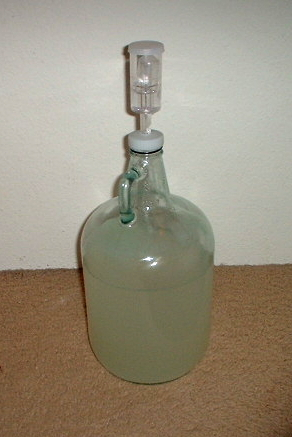
Kilju in its fifth day of fermentation. An air lock has been added to keep unnecessary and harmful bacteria away from the fermenting beverage.

The process is similar to that of homebrewing wine. If done slowly, it requires rigorous hygiene and filtering of the product. If brewed fast, specialized dried yeasts are available in amounts to drive the fermentation process through before bacterial infiltration can take place, in about three days. In Finnish, the latter are called pikahiiva (lit. quick-yeast), and they are sold in about 100 g (3 1/2 oz) packs dry, as opposed to the live standard pack of brewer's yeast of 50 g (1 3/4 oz) wet.

Properly made kilju is a clear, colorless, or off-white liquid with little discernible taste other than that of ethanol. It can be produced by natural settling of the yeast over time, but nowadays various fining agents are used to hasten the process as well.

Kilju is often produced improperly by home brewers who allow contaminants to disrupt fermentation or do not adequately filter or rack the liquid, or do not use a fining agent. The latter mistakes result in yeast being suspended, causing the mixture to be cloudy rather than clear. The yeast is not harmful, but can yield an unpleasant taste and intestinal discomfort. It is also a common mistake to leave the carbon dioxide produced by fermentation into the suspension, so that the yeast provides it with nucleation sites, keeping the yeast up in the solution. Proper technique calls for airing the product during the first few days of fermentation by stirring the must. Fining agents such as microsilica or various semipolar proteinaceacous or carbohydrate agents are also used to get the yeast to fall out of suspension.

However, once alcohol is produced, care should be taken to avoid oxidisation. If the yeast is still active (the standard gravity is still falling day after day) and the ABV is low, gentle stirring will unsettle the trapped carbon dioxide and allow for oxygen to replace it. In the early stages of fermentation this is preferable as yeast need oxygen to survive. If yeast are active and ABV is high, brief stirring is permissible but risky. Allowing the gasses to transfer through an airlock over time is far safer, but takes longer. If yeast are dormant (the standard gravity remains steady 7 days after the last reading) then degassing should only take place through an airlock. Racking with the use of a siphon to another vessel is recommended at this stage.

=== Ingredients ===
An easy way to produce fermented water is to obtain turbo yeast kits (contains Saccharomyces cerevisiae yeast strain, enzymes, vitamins, and minerals) that instructs on the package the quantity of white sugar, and tap water needed.

- Inverted sugar syrup
  - Water
  - Sugars in wine: White sugar (or crystallized sucrose) is cheap and common. Also, partially refined sugars such as brown sugar should be avoided, as a major constituent of fine commercial brown sugar is molasses, and molasses are used to (for example) produce a distinct flavor in rum. Using plain sugar is beneficial over whole fruit, as unwanted methanol tends to be a major occurrence in fruit spirits.
- Yeast in winemaking: The most common yeast associated with winemaking is Saccharomyces cerevisiae. Saccharomyces cerevisiae is excellent at producing ethanol. Yeast are dependent on a few nutrients (often included in yeast kit sanchets) to produce as much ethanol as possible; the most important ones are:
  - Invertase is an enzyme that cleaves the glycosidic linkage between the glucose and fructose molecules in sucrose. This helps the yeast metabolize the sugars faster.
  - Thiamine increases the resistance of the yeast Saccharomyces cerevisiae against oxidative, osmotic and thermal stress.
  - Yeast assimilable nitrogen (YAN), is the combination of free amino nitrogen (FAN), ammonia (NH_{3}) and ammonium (NH_{4}^{+}) that is available for the wine yeast Saccharomyces cerevisiae to use during fermentation. Outside the sugars in wine, nitrogen is the most important nutrient needed to carry out a successful fermentation that doesn't end prior to the intended point of dryness or sees the development of off-odors and related wine faults.

==== Inverted sugar syrup ====
Inverted sugar syrup for fermented water is usually home-made by fully dissolving sugar in cold tap water. Yeast requires oxygen rich water that does not exceed 25 °C (77 °F).

A common manual way to dissolve refined sugar is to mix with water in a container which is half filled, and then sealed and shaken. However, a mixer or blender may be used to automatically dissolve the sugar, in turns, if necessary.

==== Yeast ====
Yeast, and yeast nutrition, is mixed in the syrup. One gram pure yeast consumes approximately 0.2 g sugar.

Yeasts will usually die out once the alcohol level reaches about 15% due to the toxicity of alcohol on the yeast cells' physiology while the more alcohol tolerant Saccharomyces species take over. In addition to S. cerevisiae, Saccharomyces bayanus is a species of yeast that can tolerate alcohol levels of 17–20%.

=== Alcohol measurement ===
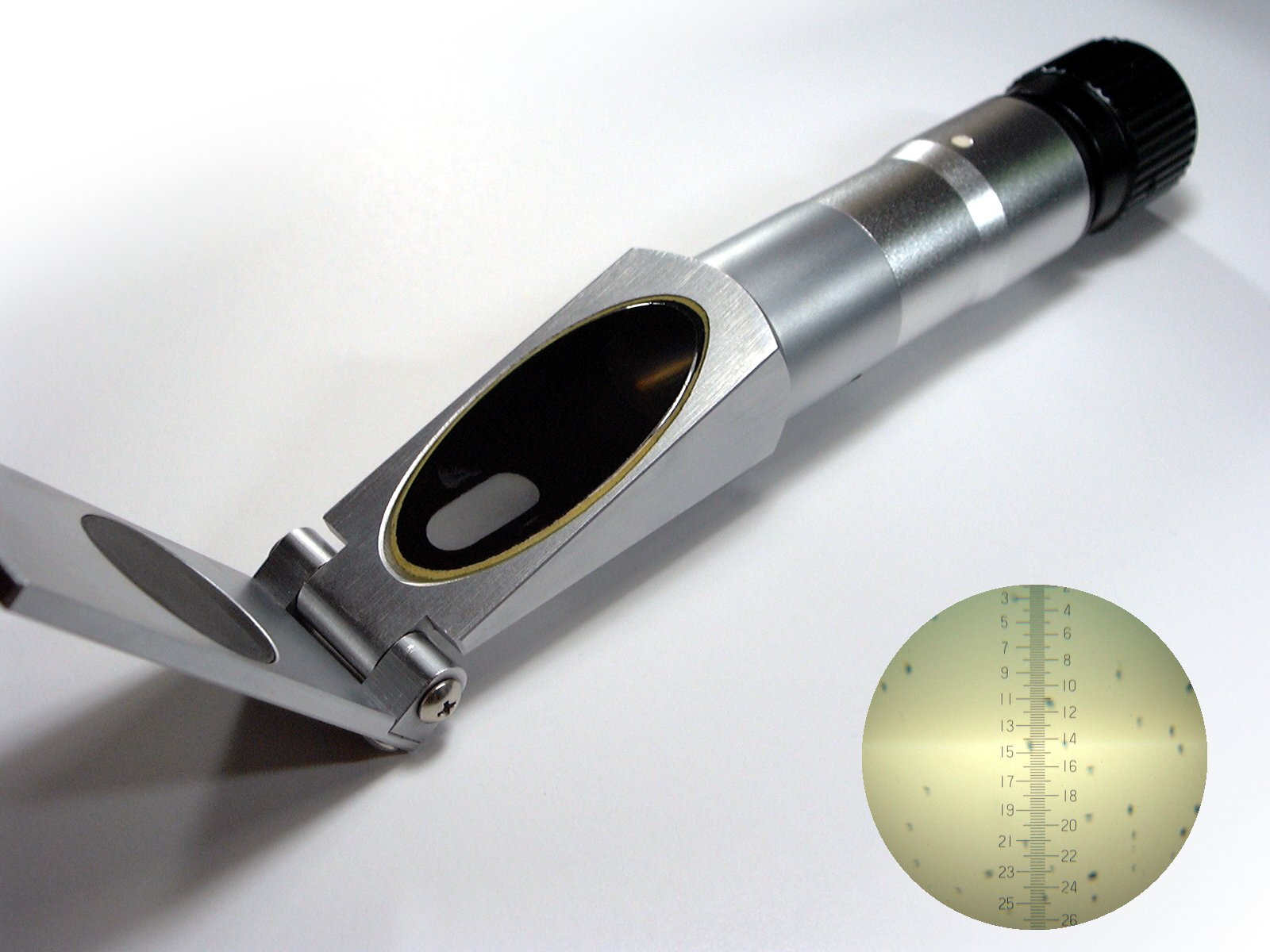
A classical hand-held must weight-type refractometer.

1. To make plain crude kilju, the must weight must be zero: A fermentation lock should indicate less than a bubble per minute. Then the sugar reserve is measured with a must weight refractometer/hygrometer. If there's sugar left, then more yeast should be added to consume it, and this measurement process should be repeated. A solution with sugar is not fermented water, but fermented syrup.
2. Clarification: The solution is clarified, typically with a fining agent such as bentonite.
3. Alcohol by volume: Only when the must weight is zero, and when the solution has been clarified, an alcoholic hydrometer, or an ethanol-type refractometer, will display accurate alcohol volume. A leftover sugar reserve will give false values.

==== Alcohol adjustment ====
Since fermented water contains no flavors, water may be added to cut down the ABV if desired.

=== Post-process ===
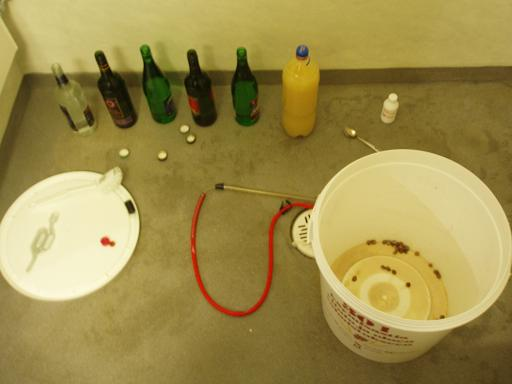
Equipment used to make kilju, and a bottle of unclarified kilju, with water-logged raisins to avoid legal issues in Finland before 1 March 2018.

Fermented water contains a similar alcoholic content of wines as both beverages are fermented on yeast, however fermented water differs from wine and other fermented beverages in that it contains no fruit juice or residual sugar after manufacture.

Kilju can be produced by fermenting sugar, yeast, and water, but it was illegal in Finland before March 2018; therefore, grain, potatoes, fruits or berries were used during fermentation to avoid legal problems and to flavor the drink. Oranges and lemons are a popular choice for this purpose.

==== Undistilled ====
===== Flavoring =====
Kilju often has additives such as citrus fruits, apples, berry juices, or artificial flavorings. Flavored kilju from fruits for example doesn't necessarily have to be sweet as long as all sugar is consumed by the yeast.

Kilju (15-17% ABV) contains 2.4-2.7 times more water than 40% distilled spirit. Since kilju contains approximately 85% water, it can be mixed with concentrates such as a drink mixer, fruit syrup, or squash concentrate.

====== Carbonation (alcopop) ======
Alternatively, it can be made as a carbonated soft drink by two methods.

When served before the fermentation process is complete. Kilju made this way is high in sugar and carbon dioxide (CO_{2}) content, and has little to no alcohol, being similar to a sweet lemon soda. It is a family tradition to many. The simple production process also makes it accessible to underage drinkers. Cf. sima, commonly seasoned with lemon and unpurified cane sugar, leading to a small beer or a light mead.

To make homemade alcopop (typically to 3–7%) water is added to kilju after the fermentation process is complete to dilute the ABV accordingly. The solution is then carbonated with a soda machine, and soft drink syrup (which will lower the ABV approximately 10%) is added. Alternatively, it can be made as a carbonated soft drink when served before the fermentation process is complete. Fermented water made this way is high in sugar and carbon dioxide (CO_{2}) content, and do not need to be diluted with water because it has little to no alcohol depending on how many days it has been fermented, being similar to a sweet lemon soda.

==== Distillation (moonshine) ====
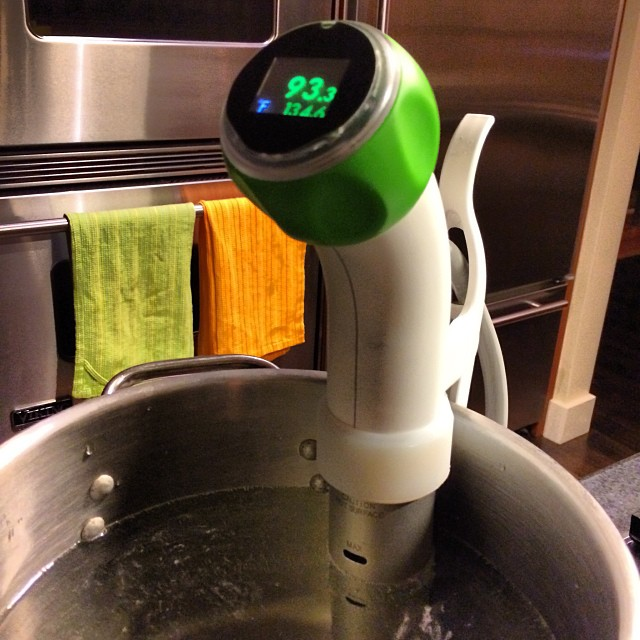
A thermal immersion circulator, like this sous vide stick, is used to evaporate ethanol in plastic stills or spiral stills.

Kilju can be refined into moonshine by means of distillation to vodka or rectified spirit, but it is illegal in most countries. It is distinct from rum because it is typically made by molasses, a byproduct of the sugar refining process, or fresh sugar cane juice that has a discernible taste of its own.

Moonshine by country, often distilled from fermented water:

- Cuba: Gualfarina
- Finland: Pontikka
- Latvia: Kandža
- Nicaragua: Cususa
- Poland: Bimber
- Russia: Samogon
- Saudi Arabia: Aragh
- Sweden: Hembränt (HB)

== Legality ==
Winemaking is legal in most countries. However, kilju is fermented from pure carbohydrates like white sugar (a plant extract) instead of grapes.

=== Finland ===
The Finnish Alcoholic Beverages Act 1 March 2018 legalized the manufacture of fermented water and wine from fruits, berries and other carbohydrate sources, without the pretense of making proper wine.

=== Sweden ===
In Sweden, it is legal to produce if the final product is not distilled.

== Consumption ==
Kilju is often mixed with juice or some other beverage to mask off tastes, of which there can be several.

Compared to wines, kilju most closely resembles Beaujolais nouveau, which is drunk after only a few weeks of fermentation. However, properly made kilju will not easily turn into vinegar, lacking the nutrients necessary for further fermentation. It is possible to drink kilju years after it was made if it has been properly stored. In fact as white wines, it ages well into 2-3a, especially when made from impure cane sugar, molasses included (fariinisokeri), or if brewed partially from oat malt and hops, as an extra strong beer.

=== Binge drinking ===
Kilju is regarded as a low-quality drink that is primarily consumed for its alcohol content, mainly associated with binge drinking. Due to its low cost, potential wine fault (when not clarified enough), and simple production process, kilju is mostly drunk by low-income people.

== History ==
When homebrewing grew in popularity during the economic depression that followed the Finnish banking crisis of the early 1990s, yeast strains known as "turbo yeast" ("turbohiiva", "pikahiiva") were introduced to the market. These yeast strains enable a very rapid fermentation to full cask strength, in some cases in as little as three days (compared to several weeks required by traditional wine yeast strains). Such a short production time naturally does not allow the yeast to become lees. The introduction of turbo yeast reinforced the public's view of kilju as an easy method of procuring cheap alcohol.

== See also ==
- Fermented tea
- Free Beer
- Mead
- Fruit wine
- Pruno
- Tharra
