= Kulus =

Kulus may refer to:

- Külüs, Azerbaijan
- Kulus, Iran
- Kulus, a character in Kwakwaka'wakw mythology
