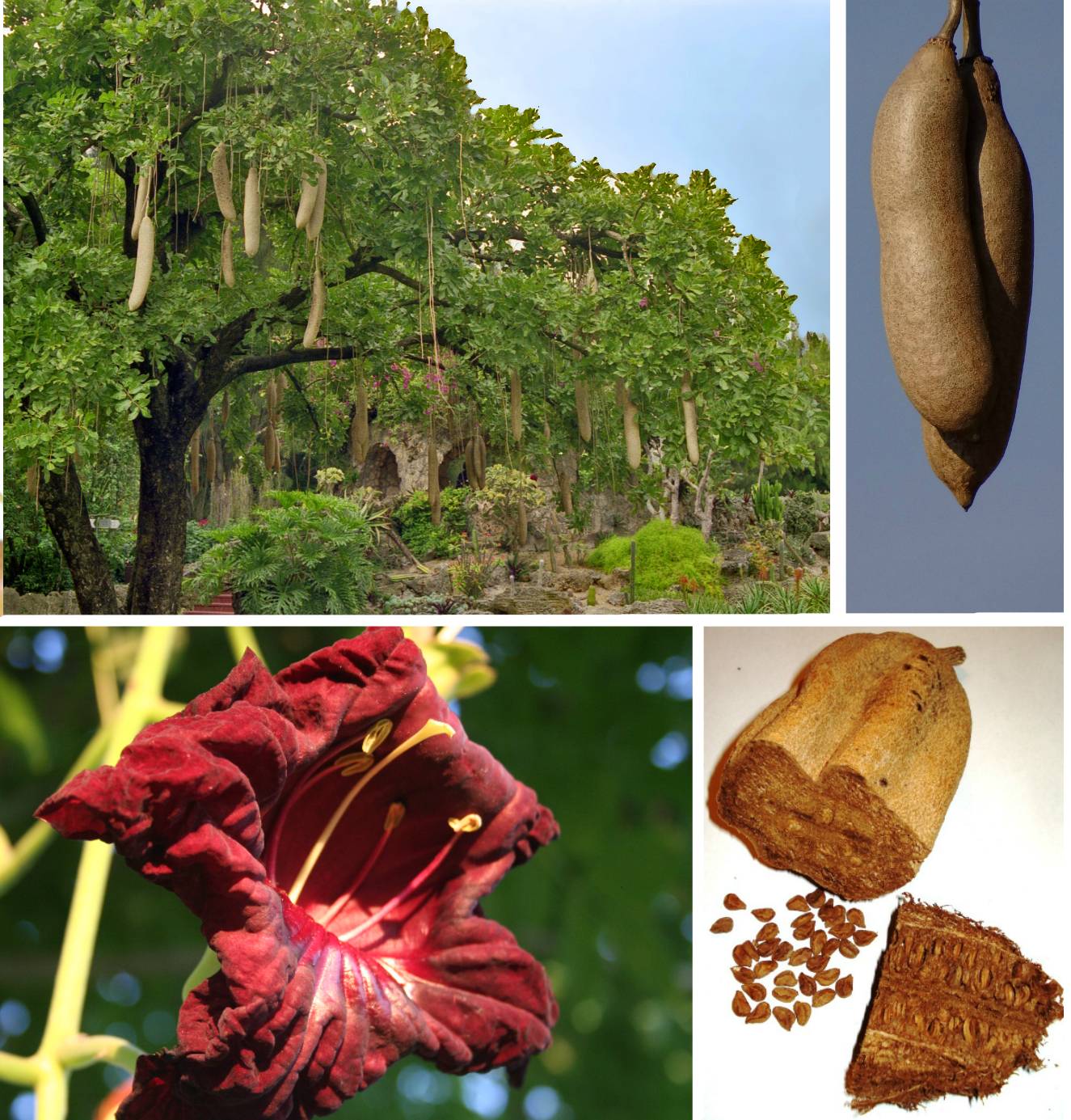
- K. africana habitat, fruit, flower and seeds

Conservation status
- Least Concern (IUCN 3.1)

Scientific classification
- Kingdom: Plantae
- Clade: Tracheophytes
- Clade: Angiosperms
- Clade: Eudicots
- Clade: Asterids
- Order: Lamiales
- Family: Bignoniaceae
- Clade: Crescentiina
- Clade: Paleotropical clade
- Genus: Kigelia; DC.
- Species: K. africana

Binomial name
- Kigelia africana (Lam.) Benth.

= Kigelia =

Genus of African tree

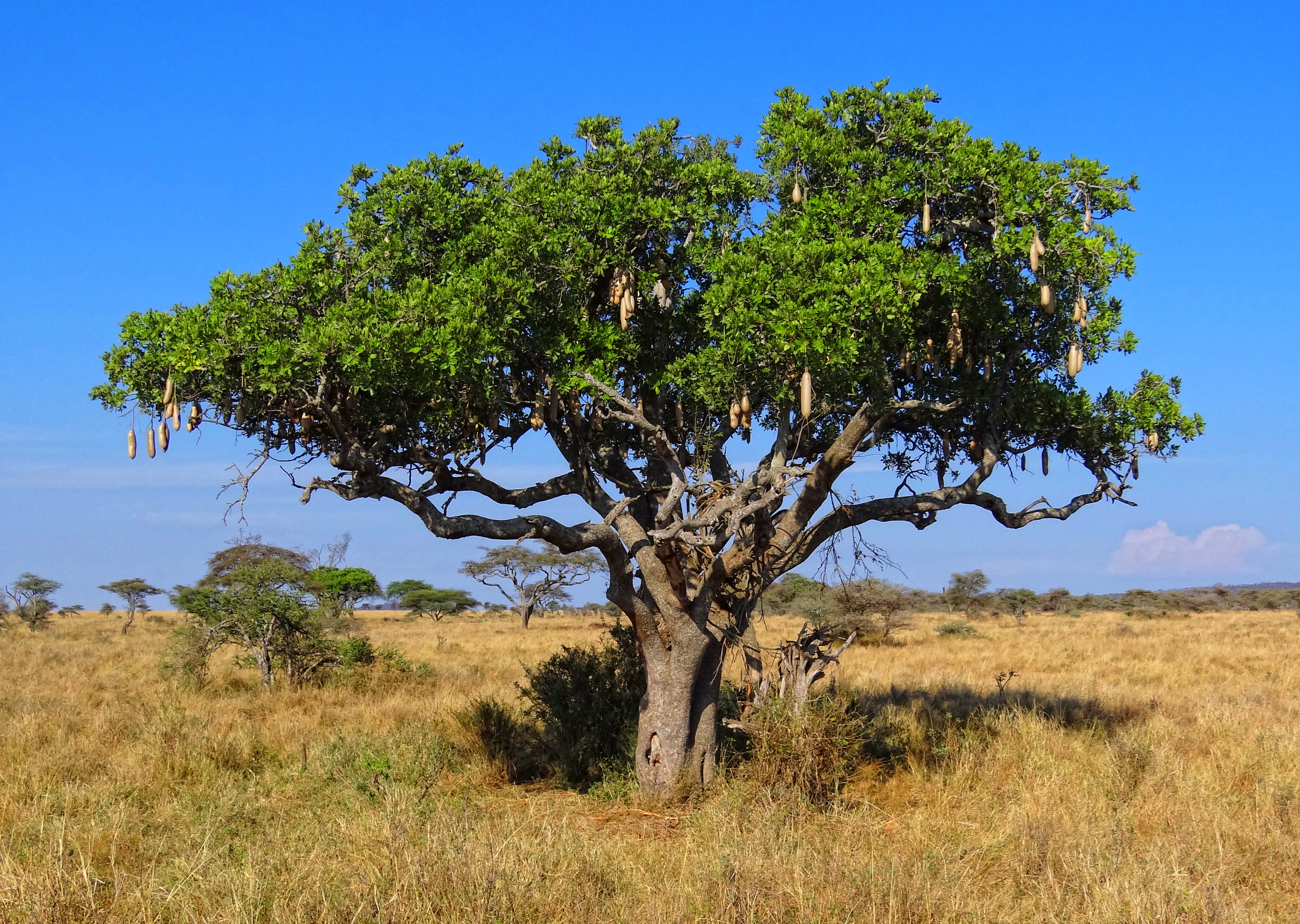
K. africana in Serengeti National Park

Kigelia is a genus of flowering plants in the trumpet vine family Bignoniaceae. The genus consists of only one species, Kigelia africana, syn. Kigelia pinnata, which occurs throughout tropical Africa and is cultivated elsewhere in the tropics.

Often called sausage tree, it grows a fruit that is up to 60 centimetres (24 in) long, weighs about 5–10 kilograms (11–22 lb), and resembles a sausage in a casing. The fruit and bark of the plant are used by African tribes as traditional medicine. The fruit is poisonous for humans when raw, but is also made into an alcoholic drink by tribes in Kenya. It is eaten by elephants, baboons, and other wild animals, which may disperse the seeds, but their importance for seed dispersal remains unverified. Bats pollinate the flowers by drinking their nectar. They can also be pollinated via airstreams, insects, and birds.

== Etymology ==
The genus name comes from the Mozambican Bantu name, kigeli-keia, while the common names sausage tree and cucumber tree refer to the large sausage-shaped fruit. Its name in Afrikaans, worsboom, also means sausage tree, while its Arabic name means "the father of kit-bags".

== Description ==
The tree can be deciduous or evergreen depending on rainfall. It has a rounded crown, a thick trunk, and spreading, low-branching limbs; its bark is dark grey to light brown and scaly, with the inner bark being creamy-white, and the branches are marked with lenticels. It can grow up to 24 metres (79 ft) tall.

The bark is grey and smooth at first, peeling on older trees. It can be as thick as 6 mm (0.24 in) on a 15 cm (5.9 in) diameter branch. The wood is pale brown or yellowish, undifferentiated, and not prone to cracking.

The tree mostly grows in the wild, especially in wetter places such as rainforest, woodland, wetter savanna, and shrubland on loamy, red clay soil, which may be rocky. It can grow from sea level to 3,000 m elevation.

=== Foliage ===
The leaves are arranged alternately along the stem and are divided into several pairs of leaflets, usually with a single leaflet at the tip. Each leaf can be up to 50 cm (20 in) long and typically has three to six pairs of opposite leaflets. The leaflets are shaped from oval to narrow and pointed, measuring 7–20 cm (2.8–7.9 in) long and 4–12 cm (1.6–4.7 in) wide. Their edges are mostly smooth, sometimes slightly toothed, and their bases are slightly uneven, ranging from rounded to wedge-shaped. The upper surface of the leaflets is shiny green and often rough, while the underside is dull green and can be either smooth or softly hairy. The central vein is sunken on the upper side, with seven to twelve pairs of prominent side veins visible underneath. The leaves do not have stipules, and the terminal leaflet can be either present or absent.

=== Flowers ===
The flowers hang down from branches on long flexible stems (2–6 m or 7–20 ft long), exceptionally up to 7.5 m (25 ft) in length. The flowers are produced in panicles; they are bell-shaped and fleshy (similar to those of the African tulip tree but broader, darker, and more waxy), orange to maroon or purplish green, and about 10 cm (3.9 in) (occasionally as much as 12 cm (4.7 in)) wide. The flowers are hermaphrodite, display symmetry across only one plane (zygomorphic), and have petals arranged in groups of five. The flowers have four fertile stamens: one smaller sterile stamen, a conical ovary, and emit a strong unpleasant scent at night, attracting bats for pollination, though are also much visited in daylight by nectar-feeding birds.

=== Fruit ===
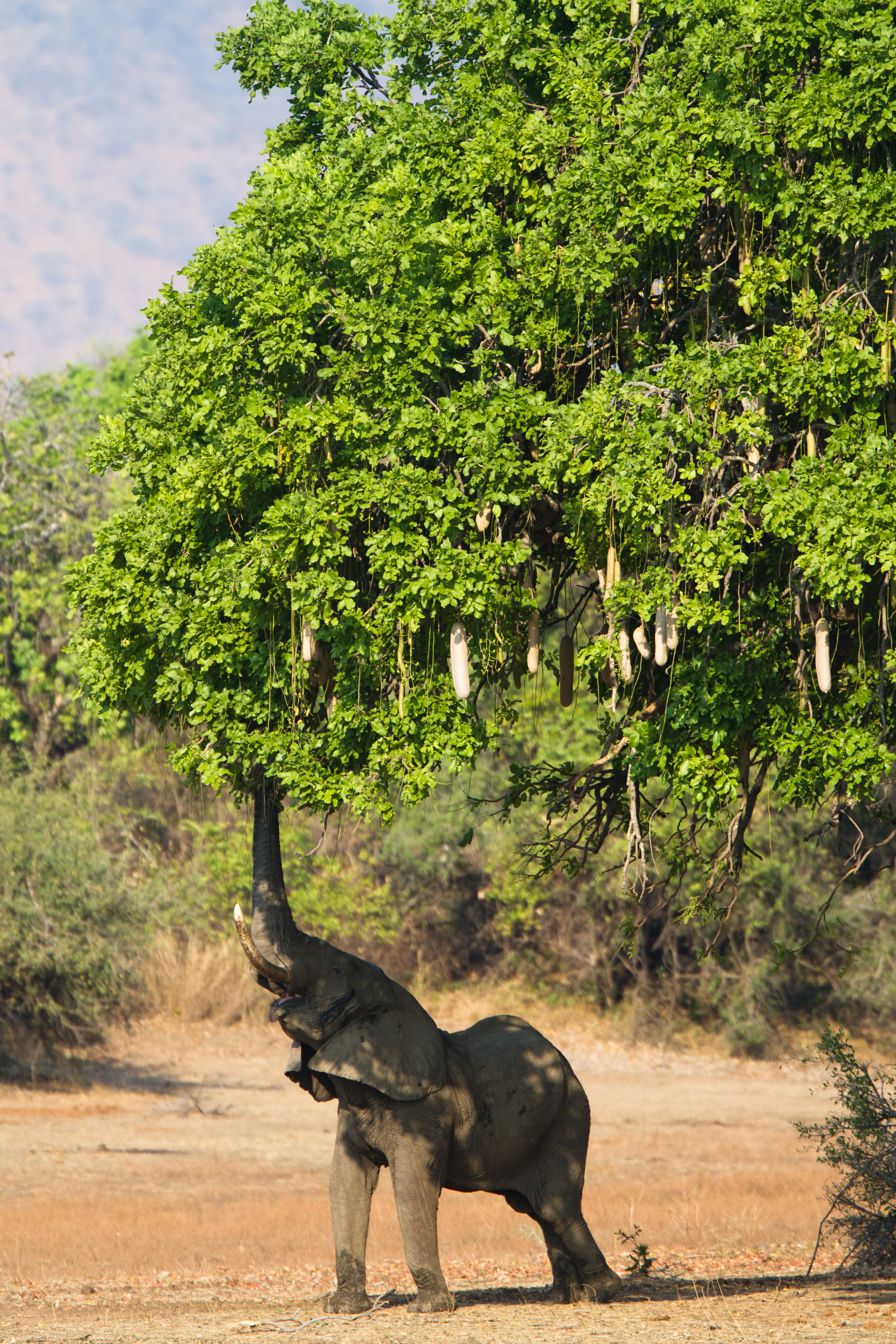
African bush elephant eating the fruit

The fruit is a tough, very fibrous, indehiscent, greyish-brown, somewhat woody berry from 30 to 100 cm (12 to 39 in) long and up to 18 cm (7.1 in) diameter, but 20 cm (7.9 in) has been reported. Typically the fruit weighs between 5–10 kg (11–22 lb) but occasionally up to 12 kg (26 lb), and hangs down on the long, rope-like peduncles. The fruit pulp is fibrous, containing many seeds, which are unwinged, 1.25 cm long, and obovate. The fruit pulp is poisonous to humans and strongly purgative, causing blistering of the tongue and skin, though the seeds may be roasted and eaten safely.

== Uses ==
Traditionally, the tree has been used by local African tribes in the belief that the plant is useful as a therapy for various disorders. Extract from the peel of the fruit has anti-inflammatory and anti-bacterial properties while the fruit itself, when crushed, can be used to treat constipation. The tree components contain diverse phytochemicals, including phenols, coumarins, sterols, triterpenes, diterpenes, unsaturated fatty acids, quinones, iridoids, alkanes, and esters.

In Botswana, the timber is used for makoros, yokes and oars. More generally, it is also used as fuel and for the construction of canoes, planks, fence posts, as well as crafting various household items such as containers, musical instruments, furnitures, and tool handles. Branches are also used for making bows. Both the wood and fruit are carved into objects like traps, toys, and dining utensils, while the wood also provides fuel. The tannin-rich fruit pulp yields a black dye for colouring and dying purposes. Early use of the wood for wedge-shaped tools was discovered at Kalambo Falls, Zambia, dating to between 390,000 and 324,000 years ago.

Around Mount Kenya, especially among the Kikuyu, Embu and the Akamba, the dried fruit are used to make an alcoholic mead beverage (Muratina in Kikuyu and Embu). The harvested fruit is split into two along the grain, and soaked to make it less bitter, before being dried in the sun. Cane sugar is then added to the fruit pieces. The fruit are fermented for anywhere between two and four days in a warm environment, with the final ethanol content being between 3 and 6%.

The tree is widely grown as an ornamental tree in tropical regions for its decorative flowers and unusual fruit.

Kigelia africana also holds significant cultural and spiritual importance for many African communities. The tree is held to be sacred, and the fruit are widely traded in local markets as talismans that are thought to bring good luck in many different situations.

== Distribution ==
Although native to Africa, Kigelia has been transplanted worldwide for its ornamental value. In Townsville, Queensland, Australia, it exists on the James Cook University campus. It is also cultivated in the Andean region of Colombia.

== Gallery ==
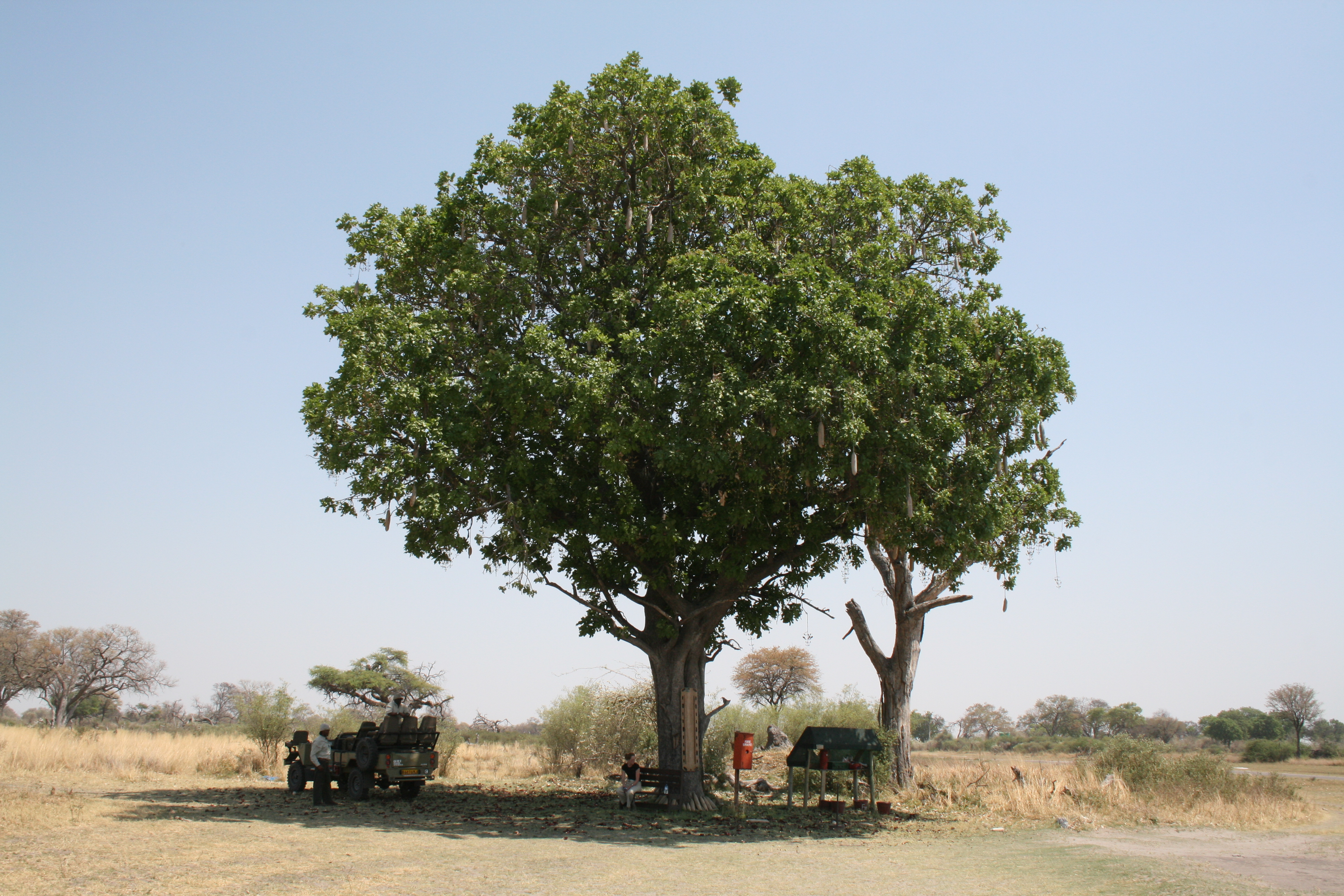
A sausage tree in Botswana in use as an airport departure lounge

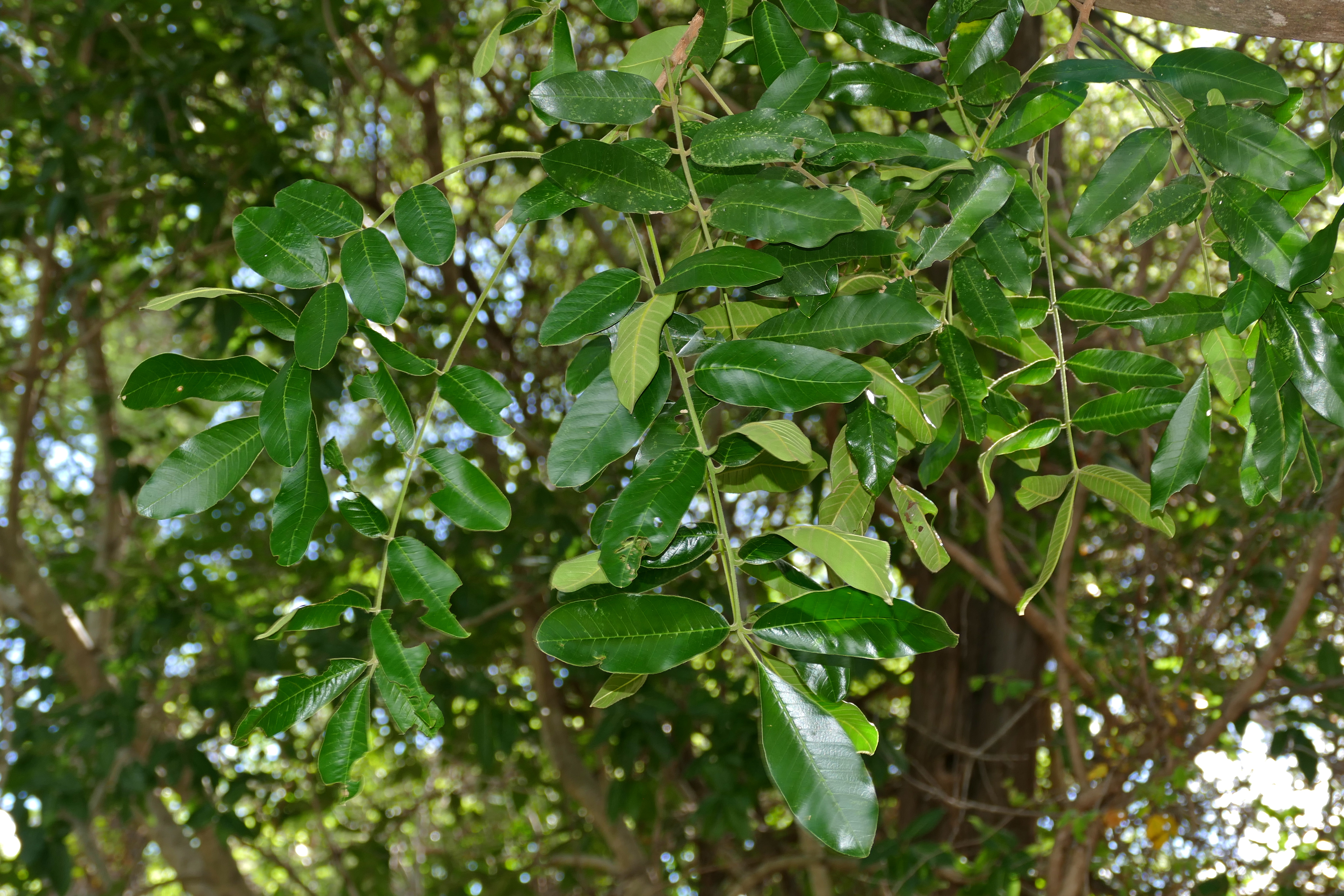
Leaves, Kruger National Park

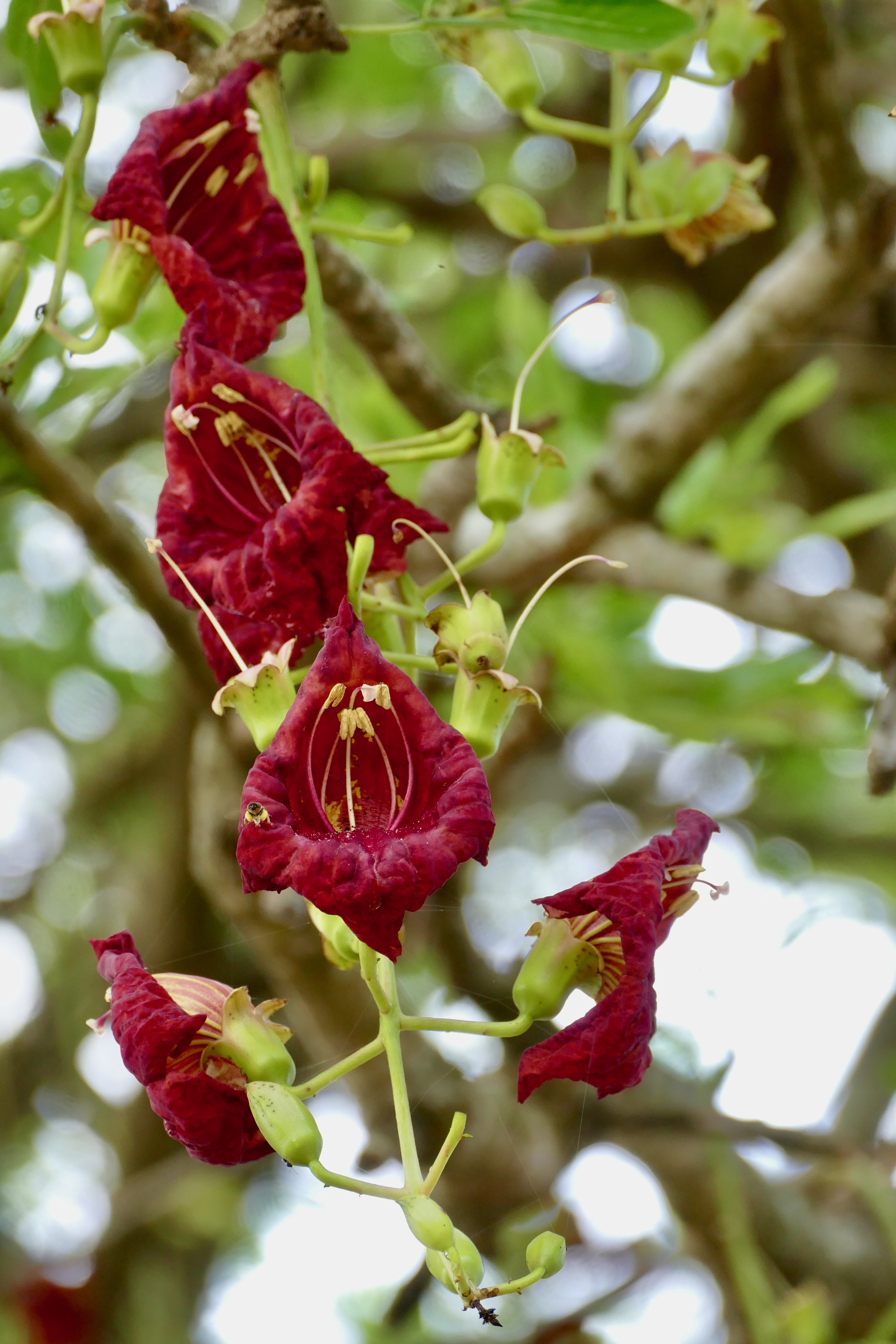
Inflorescence, Kruger National Park

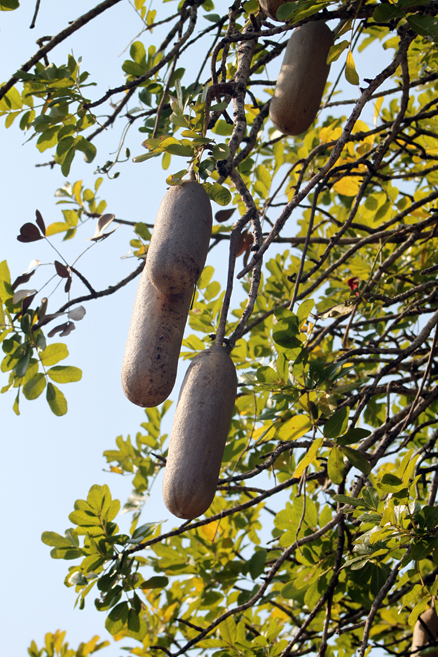
Fruit, Kruger National Park

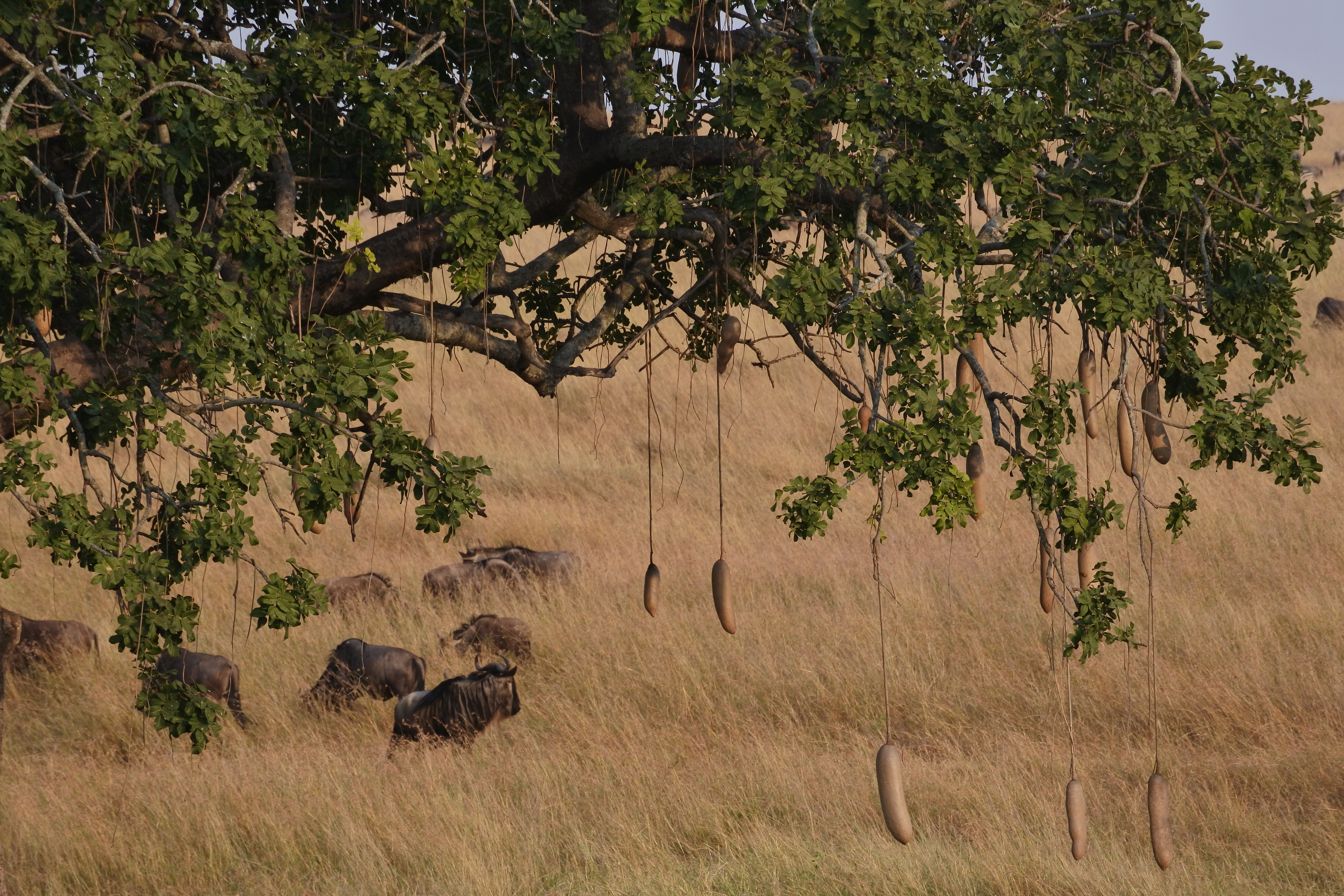
Fruit, showing the exceptional length of the stems; Kenya

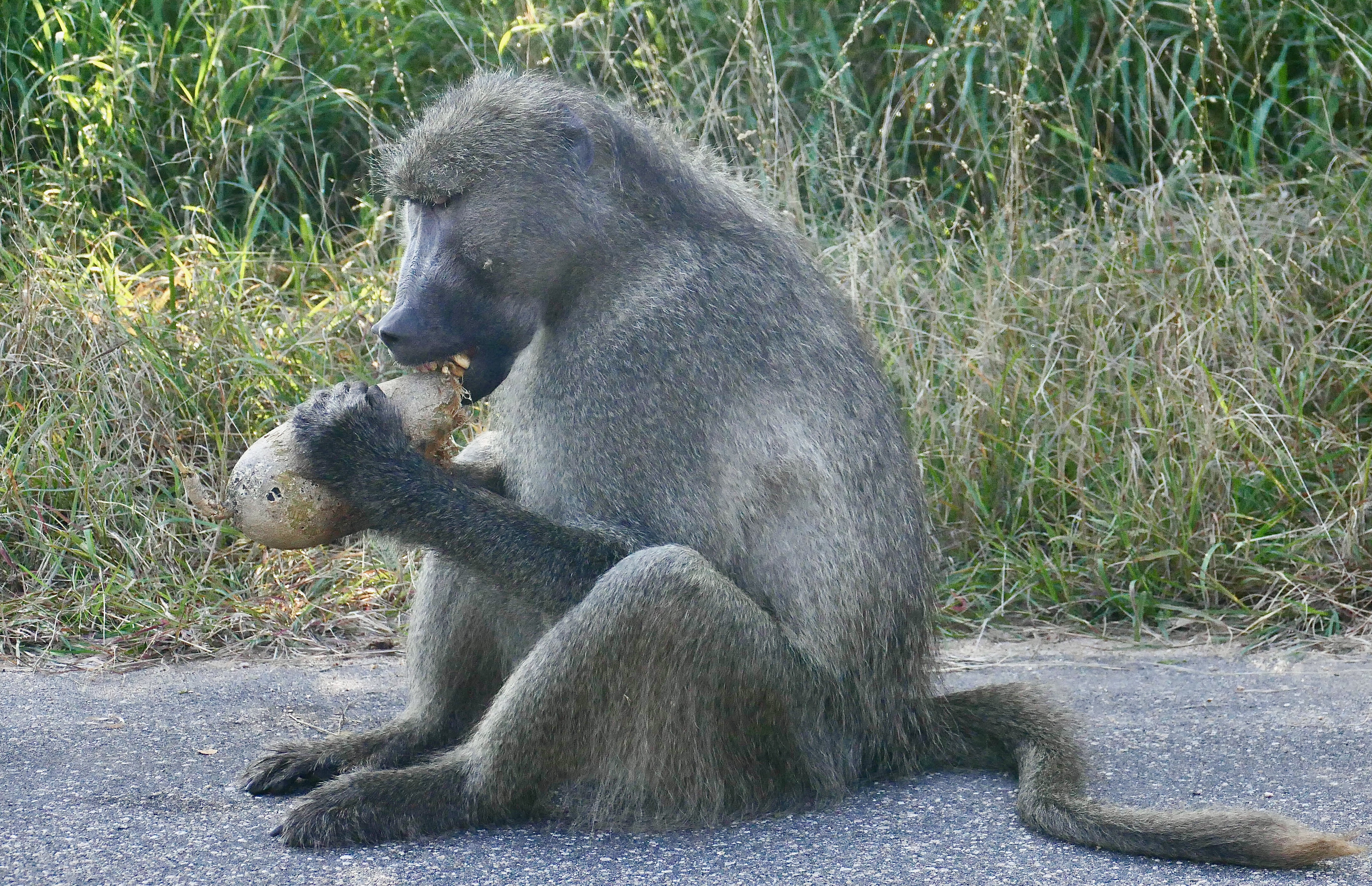
Chacma baboon eating the fruit
