= Kallur, Chittoor district =

Kallur kalluru
- Village
- Interactive map of Kallur
- Location in Andhra Pradesh, India Kallur (India)
- Coordinates: 13.55°N 78.99°E
- Country: India
- State: Andhra Pradesh
- District: Chittoor

Languages
  - Official: Telugu
- Time zone: UTC+5:30 (IST)
- PIN: 517113
- Telephone code: 91–8585
- Vehicle registration: AP03, AP39
- Nearest Cities: Pileru, Chittoor
- Assembly Constituency: Punganur
- Lok Sabha Constituency: Rajampeta

Kallur is a village in Chittoor district of the Indian state of Andhra Pradesh. It is located in Pulicherla mandal.
