= Sima (mead) =

Finnish fermented low level alcoholic drink and soft drink

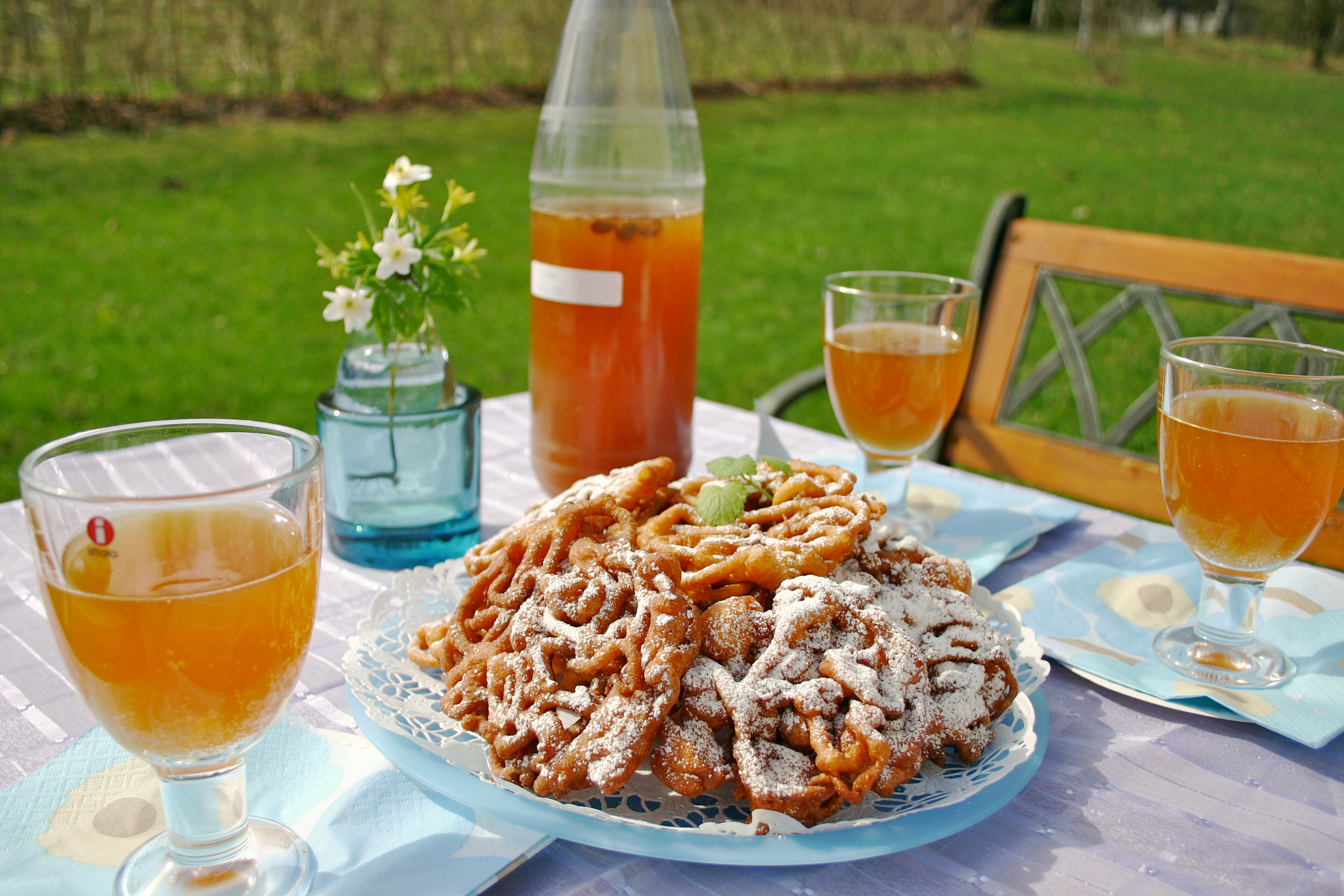
Sima is often served with tippaleipä or other Vappu pastries.

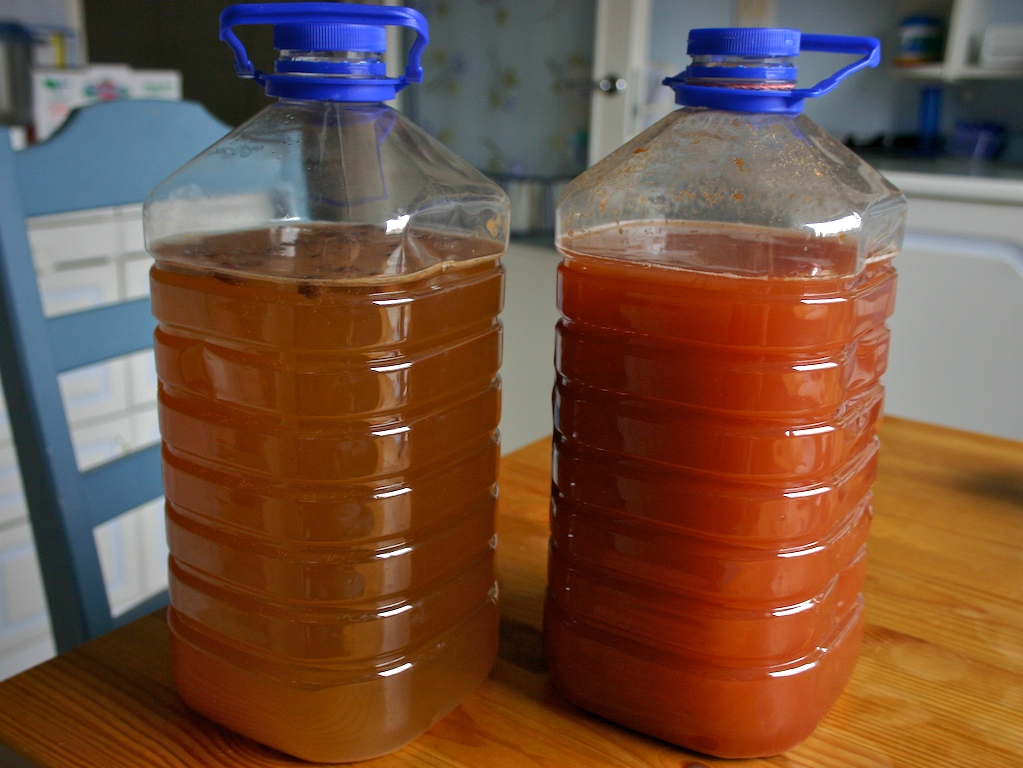
Two varieties of sima: original (left) and rhubarb (right)

Sima is a Finnish fermented low-alcohol drink and soft drink. It is traditionally a form of mead, an alcoholic beverage produced by fermenting a solution of honey and water, although in modern times the honey is generally replaced with different kinds of sugar, mostly syrup, which makes it a sugar wine. The drink also has a very low alcohol content due to limited fermentation. Sima is therefore a sweet sparkling beverage that is mainly seasonal and connected with the Finnish Vappu festival. It is usually spiced by adding both the flesh and rind of a lemon.

Sima is usually accompanied by a munkki (donut), a tippaleipä (a special Vappu funnel cake), or a rosetti (rosette).

The Finnish word sima is an old name for honey, which Elias Lönnrot used to mean a drink in his epic poetry, the Kalevala.

== History ==
Mead was originally brought to Finland in the 1500s from Lübeck and Riga. The modern concept of a low-alcohol sima originated in the 1700s, as it was developed to be a more refreshing summer beverage. This version of sima is found in the cookbooks of Cajsa Warg. During the 1900s, the drink became associated with the Finnish labour movement and the Finnish Walpurgis Night festivities.

== Ingredients and preparation ==
Sima's usual ingredients include lemon, active dry yeast, and raisins. Sugar is added as brown sugar, white sugar, honey, or some combination of them. In some recipes, hops are included for added flavor. The concoction of water and the lemon and sugars are mixed, boiled, and cooled to room temperature. The yeast is added and the mixture left to stand overnight. Then it is carefully decanted into bottles and a few raisins are added to each bottle.

During secondary fermentation, raisins are added to control the amount of sugars and to act as an indicator of readiness for consumption — they will swell by absorbing carbon dioxide and rise to the top of the bottle when the drink is ready. The sima will be ready in about three to seven days depending on its temperature. It is served chilled. Usually, the alcohol content is low and the drink is suitable for children. Carbonation is produced by the yeast, and the drink is traditionally cloudy and not clarified or filtered. Because of this, traditional sima is a fresh product that does not store for long; fermentation may continue in a bottle and the alcoholicity may rise. Commercial sima (sold as a soft drink, with alcohol less than 1%) is filtered and clear, and contains no raisins.

== See also ==
- Kilju
- Kvass
- Soma (drink)
- Tepache
