= Intus =

Filipino alcoholic drink

- Type: Sugarcane wine
- Origin: Philippines, Visayas, Mindanao

Intus was a traditional pre-colonial Filipino alcoholic drink from the Visayas Islands and Mindanao. It was made by boiling sugarcane juice until it reduces to a thick syrup. It was then allowed to cool and mixed with the bark of the kabarawan tree (Neolitsea villosa) and fermented.

The word intus (or initus) means "reduced" or "liquid thickened by boiling", from the Old Visayan verb itus ("to reduce"). Like the kabarawan drink, traditional intus is extinct. The tradition was lost during the Spanish colonial period of the Philippines. Among the Lumad people of Mindanao, intus was flavored with langkawas (Alpinia galanga) or pal-la (Cordyline fruticosa) roots.

There is a variant of Intus which is still made today, and found in Pantukan, Davao del Norte. Unlike the traditional recipe, which called for sugarcane, local matriarchs ferment taro before flavouring with langkawas. This versions seems to warrant further ageing, where the fermenting vessels (tadyaw) are buried underground for two to three years.

== See also ==
- Kabarawan
- Basi
- Palek
