= Runeberg Day =

Flag-flying day in Finland

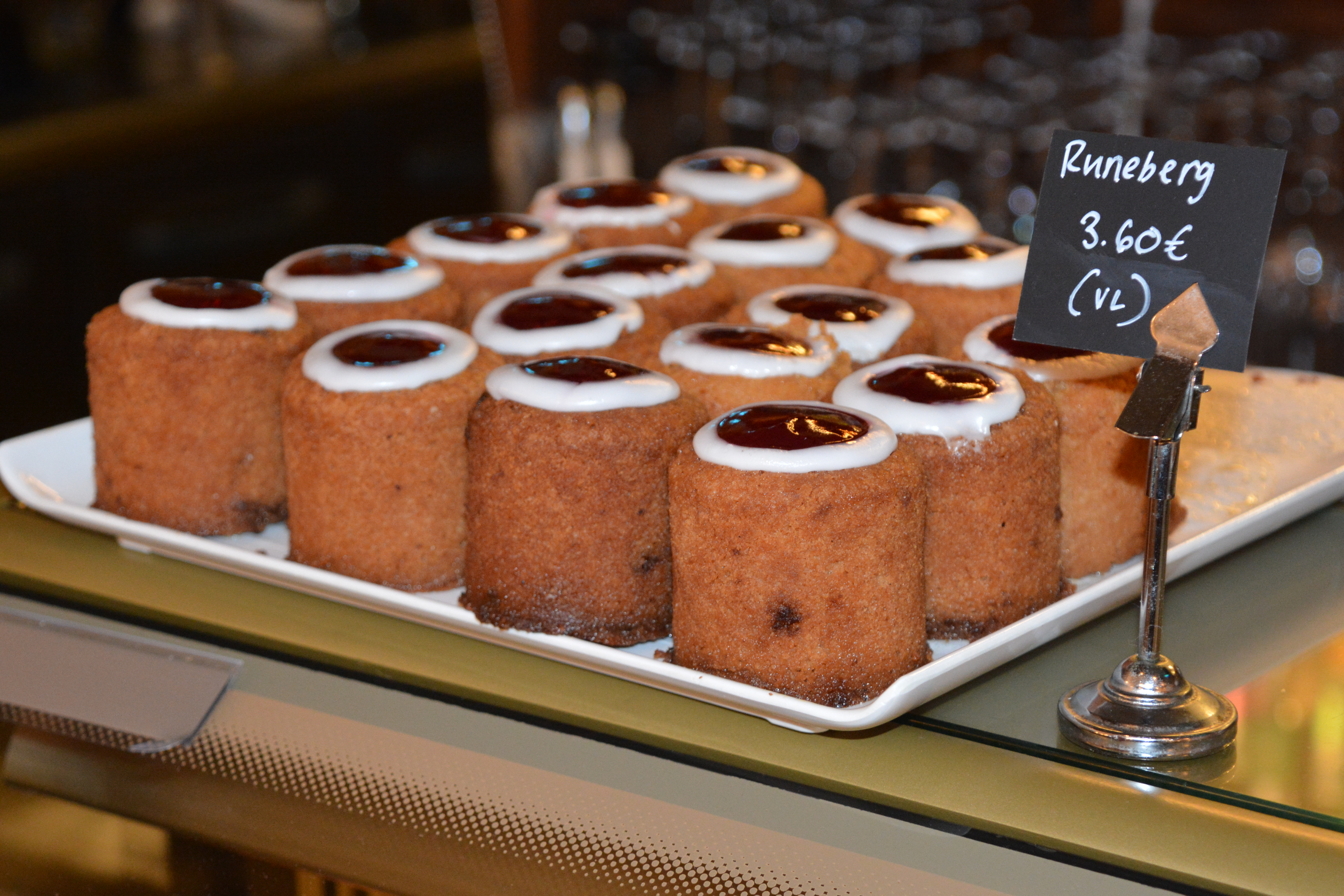
Runeberg tortes served at café

Runeberg Day (Finnish: Runebergin päivä, Swedish: Runebergsdagen) is celebrated in Finland on February 5 in honor of the national poet Johan Ludvig Runeberg, who was born on this day in 1804. Runeberg is remembered as the author of the romantic nationalistic epic The Tales of Ensign Stål. Its first poem was chosen as the Finnish national anthem.

The celebrations in Runeberg's honor began already during his lifetime. By the late 19th and early 20th centuries, Runeberg Day had become a significant national holiday, with the veneration of his memory reaching almost cult-like proportions. After 1917, Independence Day largely took its place as a national day. Runeberg Day was officially introduced to the Finnish calendar as a flag-flying day in 1952.

In the mid-20th century, Runeberg's status as a national hero began to be re-evaluated, with his glorification of war seen as outdated. His wife, Fredrika Runeberg, also began receive more recognition as one of Finland’s early novelists and a pioneer of women's rights. Today, Runeberg Day is associated with Runeberg tortes and cultural events. The Society of Swedish Literature in Finland presents its prizes in science and literature, and city of Porvoo awards the Runeberg Prize on this day.

== J.L. Runeberg ==
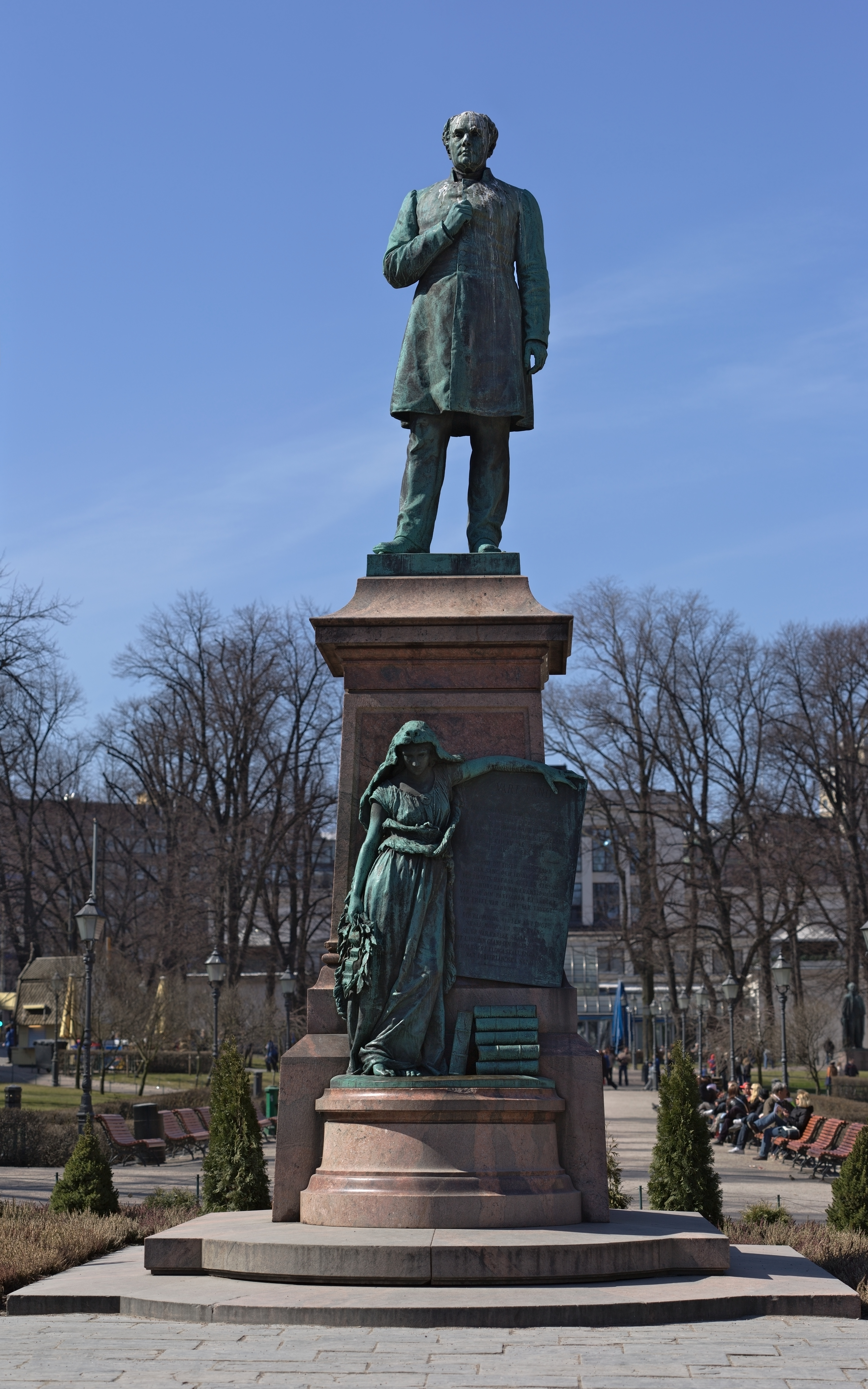
Statue of J.L. Runeberg in Helsinki

Johan Ludvig Runeberg (1804–1877) was a Finnish poet, teacher and professor. His works, together with Elias Lönnrot's Kalevala, are considered to have elevated the newly formed Grand Duchy of Finland into the ranks of cultured nations, both in the international eyes as well those of the Finns themselves.

In his poems from 1830s and 1840s, Runeberg created the idealized image of Finnish people and Finnish nature. The epic poem The Tales of Ensign Stål, published in two parts in 1848 and in 1860, gave Finland a moral identity. As a creator of patriotic sentiment and as the writer of the Finnish national anthem Vårt land (Maamme, 'Our Land'), Runeberg was acclaimed as Finland's national poet already during his lifetime.

After his death in 1877, Runeberg was elevated to an almost infallible national figure and statues were erected in his honor. His poems were introduced to the wider public through Zachris Topelius' Boken om vårt land (Maamme-kirja, 'Book of Our Land'), which was used as a textbook in Finnish schools for over 75 years.

== Celebrations during the 19th and 20th centuries ==
Runeberg Day celebrations started during the 1850s. Runeberg was first publicly celebrated on his fiftieth birthday in Jakobstad in 1854. On February 5, 1858, a student chorus from Porvoo Gymnasium sang in tribute outside his residence, and this became an annual tradition which continued until his death.

Starting in 1864, the Artist Guild of Finland, with Zachris Topelius as the leading figure, began hosting its annual celebrations on Runeberg's birthday at New Theatre (now the Swedish Theatre) in Helsinki. These gatherings were humorous and cheerful, often featuring elements perceived national, such as folk costumes, folk songs, and tableaux inspired by Runeberg's works. After Runeberg's death, the celebrations transformed into memorial events and took on a more solemn tone. It was during this time that the name Runebergsdagen became established.

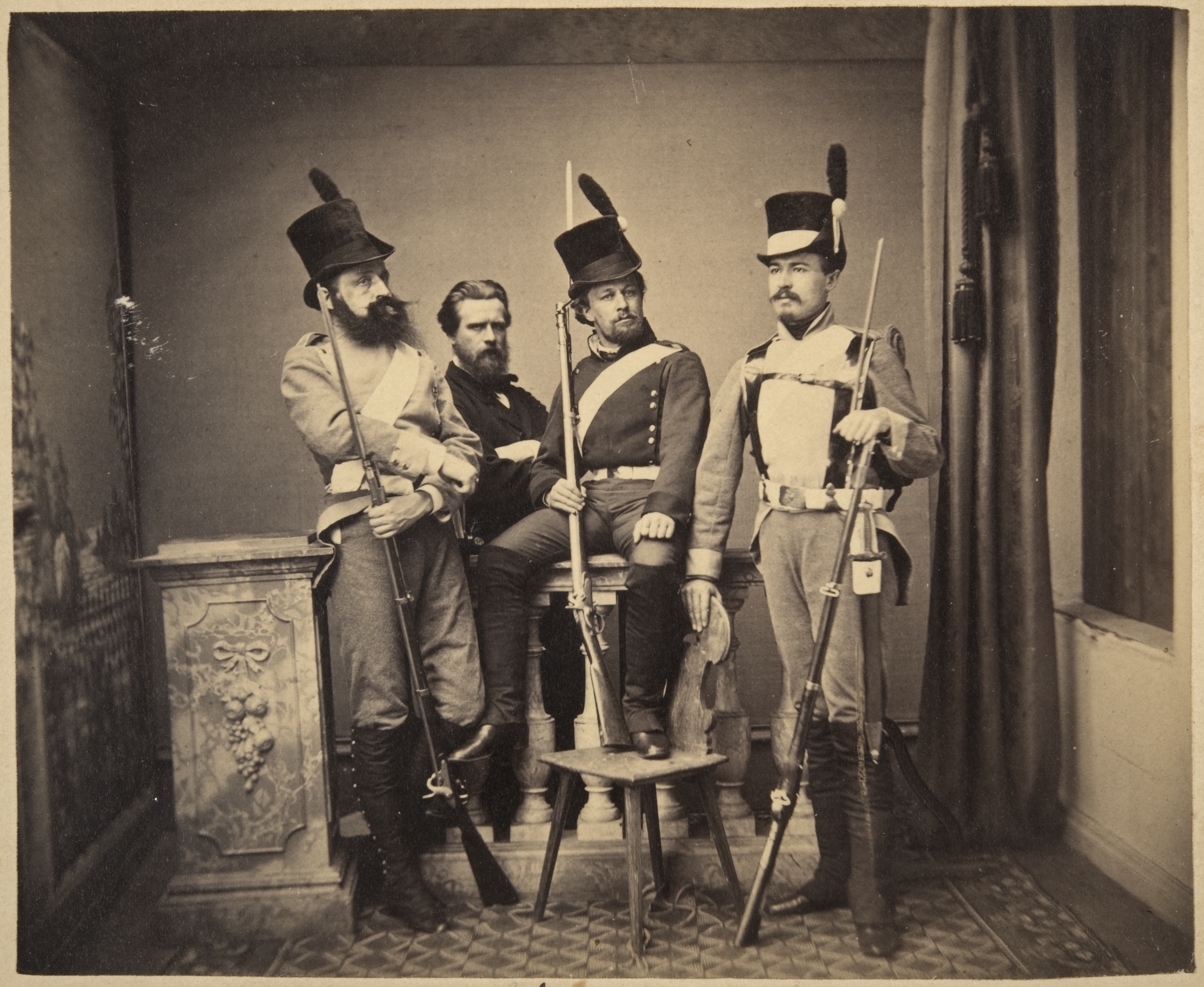
August Schauman, Carl Eneas Sjöstrand, Johannes Collan, and Leopold Krohn in a tableau enacting a scene from the Finnish War, performed during the Runeberg Day celebration hosted by the Artist Guild of Finland in 1867

In 1885, the Society of Swedish Literature in Finland was founded to preserve Runeberg's memory. The society was part of a national and liberal movement aimed at preserving Swedish language and culture, which were perceived to be under threat due to both the Russification policies of the Russian administration, and the rise of the Fennoman movement, which advocated for a greater role for the Finnish language in society. The society chose Runeberg Day as its anniversary. The society's traditions included torchlight processions, singing, and the laying of wreaths at Runeberg’s statue, which was unveiled in Helsinki in 1885. Statues were also erected in Porvoo in 1885 and Jakobstad in 1905.

Runeberg was initially celebrated as a national poet by the elite, but his poems were soon translated into Finnish and introduced into school curricula, where they were promoted to the broader public. Schools, youth associations, and various organizations organized Runeberg Day celebrations across the country. These events typically featured tableaux, songs, music, patriotic and religious speeches, and readings of Runeberg's poetry. While originally embraced by the elite, Runeberg's poetry also resonated with the masses, and The Tales of Ensign Stål could be found in many homes alongside the Bible and other religious literature.

At the end of the 19th century, during the first period of Russification, lighting candles in windows on Runeberg Day became a symbolic act of protest against the Russian authorities. In response, the authorities banned torchlight precessions, singing tributes, and the tradition of placing candles in windows on Runeberg Day. Some celebrations were held in opposition to the ban.

After Finland's independence in 1917, Runeberg Day celebrations peaked, with a record number of events held across the country. However, over time, the number of celebrations began to decline as leftist groups struggled to identify with Runeberg. He also became increasingly associated with the Swedish-speaking population, and the pro-Finnish groups elevated Finnish-language writers alongside him. During the 1920s, the tradition of lighting candles on Runeberg Day shifted to Independence Day celebrations on December 6.

In the mid-20th century, the societal values shifted, and Runeberg's works were re-evaluated. His portrayal as a national hero was increasingly challenged, and his glorification of war was seen as outdated. Although Runeberg remained Finland's national poet, his image was redefined, shifting focus from the war heroes of his poems to other aspects of his life. There was also a growing interest in his wife, Fredrika Runeberg, who was recognized as one of the first novelists in Finland, and an early advocate for women's rights.

== 21st century ==
Today, Runeberg Day is marked by various cultural and literary events, with focus on literature and culture rather than the poet himself. The Society of Swedish Literature in Finland holds its annual celebration on this day, awarding prizes to authors and researchers. The Runeberg Prize, established in 1986, and the Runeberg Junior Prize, introduced in 2017, are awarded by the city of Porvoo. In cities such as Jakobstad, Runeberg’s birthplace, and Porvoo, his long-time residence, cultural programs like singing performances and other events are organized to honor his legacy.

The most enduring tradition of Runeberg Day is the enjoyment of Runeberg tortes, a cylindrical pastry made of wheat flour and almonds, and often flavored with rum, almond oil, or lemon essence. It is typically topped with a dollop of raspberry jam, encircled by white icing. The torte originates from Porvoo, where it was introduced in the late 1840s by confectioner Lars Henrik Astenius. Runeberg himself is said to have enjoyed a similar pastry with his morning schnapps, and a recipe for it can also be found in Fredrika Runeberg's recipe book. The pastry was later popularized by Fredrik Edvard Ekberg, who began selling it at Café Ekberg in Helsinki in 1865. While Runeberg tortes were once available year-round, they are now primarily enjoyed in the weeks leading up to Runeberg Day.

== See also ==
- Flag flying days in Finland
- Kalevala Day
