= Runeberg =

Runeberg may refer to:

- Runeberg Prize, a Finnish literary award named after the poet Johan Ludvig Runeberg
- MS J. L. Runeberg, a cruise ship named after Johan Ludvig Runeberg
- Project Runeberg, a digital cultural archive initiative for Nordic countries
- Johan Ludvig Runeberg (1804–1877), Finland-Swedish priest and poet
- Walter Runeberg (1838–1920), Finnish sculptor
