= Kalevala Day =

Finnish national holiday

Kalevala Day Finnish Culture Day
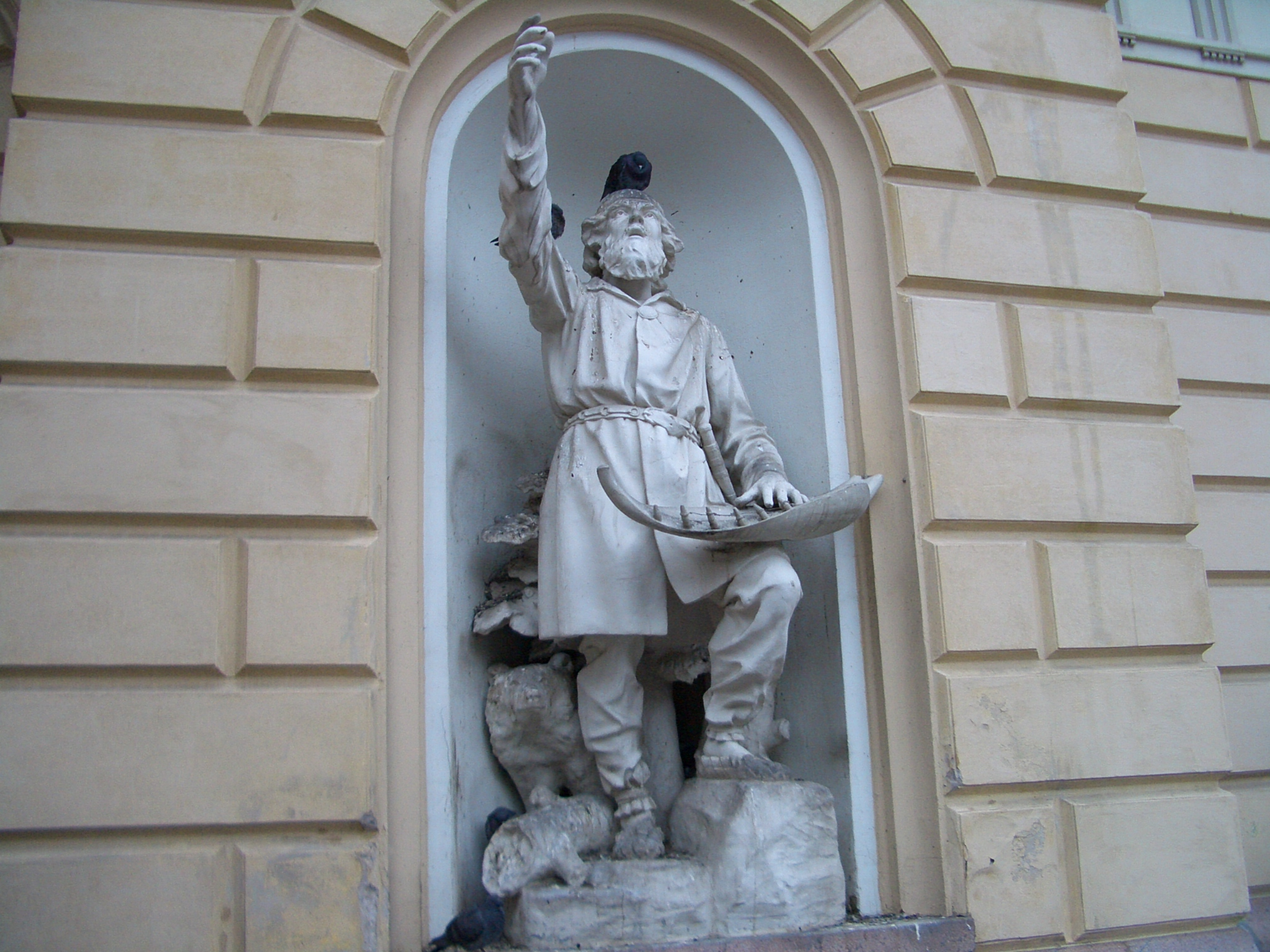
- A statue of Väinämöinen, the hero of Kalevala, decorates the Old Student House in Helsinki, Finland.
- Official name: Finnish: Kalevalan päivä, suomalaisen kulttuurin päivä
- Observed by: Finland
- Significance: Day celebrating the culture of Finland and the Kalevala epic
- Date: 28 February
- Next time: 28 February 2027
- Frequency: Annual

Kalevala Day (Finnish: Kalevalan päivä), also known as Finnish Culture Day (Finnish: suomalaisen kulttuurin päivä), is celebrated on 28 February in honor of Finnish culture and the Finnish national epic, the Kalevala. It is one of the official flag flying days in Finland.

The date is based on the day in 1835 when Elias Lönnrot signed the preface to the first edition of the Kalevala. The version of the book usually read today, the New Kalevala, was published in 1849. Celebrations of Kalevala Day are observed based on both the first edition of 1835 and the new edition of 1849.

The first celebration took place in 1865, organized by Savo-Karelian university students in Helsinki. Over time, the event grew in significance, with major public celebrations held on the 50th and 75th anniversaries of the Old Kalevala. Large-scale celebrations also took place on the 100th and 150th anniversaries of both versions of the Kalevala. The events reached their largest scale during the 1920s–1930s.

In 1978, an additional title, "Finnish Culture Day", was officially adopted, reflecting a shift in focus from exclusively celebrating the Kalevala to recognizing Finnish culture more broadly. Since its founding in 1919, the Kalevala Society has played a central role in organizing the celebrations.

== Kalevala—the Finnish-Karelian epic ==
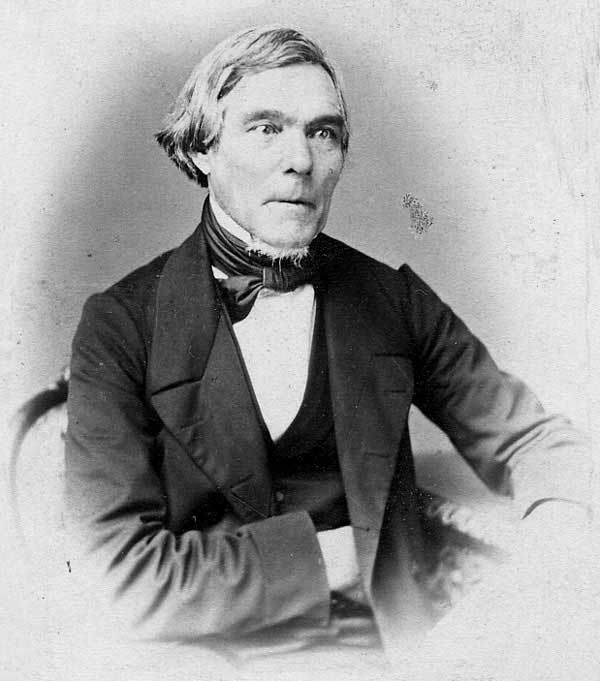
Elias Lönnrot, the composer of Kalevala

Kalevala is a 19th-century work of epic poetry compiled by Elias Lönnrot from Finnish and Karelian oral folklore and mythology. It is regarded as the national epic of Finland and Karelia and is one of the most significant works of Finnic literature. Kalevala has inspired numerous artists, including the Finnish classical composer Jean Sibelius, the Finnish painter Akseli Gallen-Kallela, and the English writer J. R. R. Tolkien. The Kalevala was awarded the European Heritage Label in 2024 as a "living epic", open to evolving interpretations.

The first version of Kalevala, known as the Old Kalevala, was published in 1835 and consists of 12,078 verses. Lönnrot signed the preface on 28 February 1835, a date later celebrated as Kalevala Day. The version of Kalevala most commonly known today, sometimes called the New Kalevala, was published in 1849. This edition contains 22,795 verses divided into fifty cantos.

== History ==
=== Origins in 19th century ===
Kalevala Day has its origins in Finland's academic world, which played a significant role in fostering the nationalistic movement during the 19th century. Amid fears of social unrest, the Russian administration banned Finnish student nations between 1852 and 1868. Despite this, in 1865, the Savo-Karelian Student Nation resumed its activities unofficially and chose to hold its annual celebration on 28 February in the honor of Kalevala. These events took on a distinctly patriotic tone, with speeches honoring Kalevala and Lönnrot as well as paying tribute to Finland and to the students' home regions of Savo and Karelia.

In 1885, the Finnish Literature Society organized the first public Kalevala celebration, to mark the 50th anniversary of the work. The main event was held at the University of Helsinki, then known as the Imperial Alexander University. Additional celebrations took place in other Finnish cities. Although Yrjö Sakari Yrjö-Koskinen, one of the speakers at the main event, referred to Kalevala Day as a day of national significance, it did not yet become an annual celebration.

=== Early 20th century ===
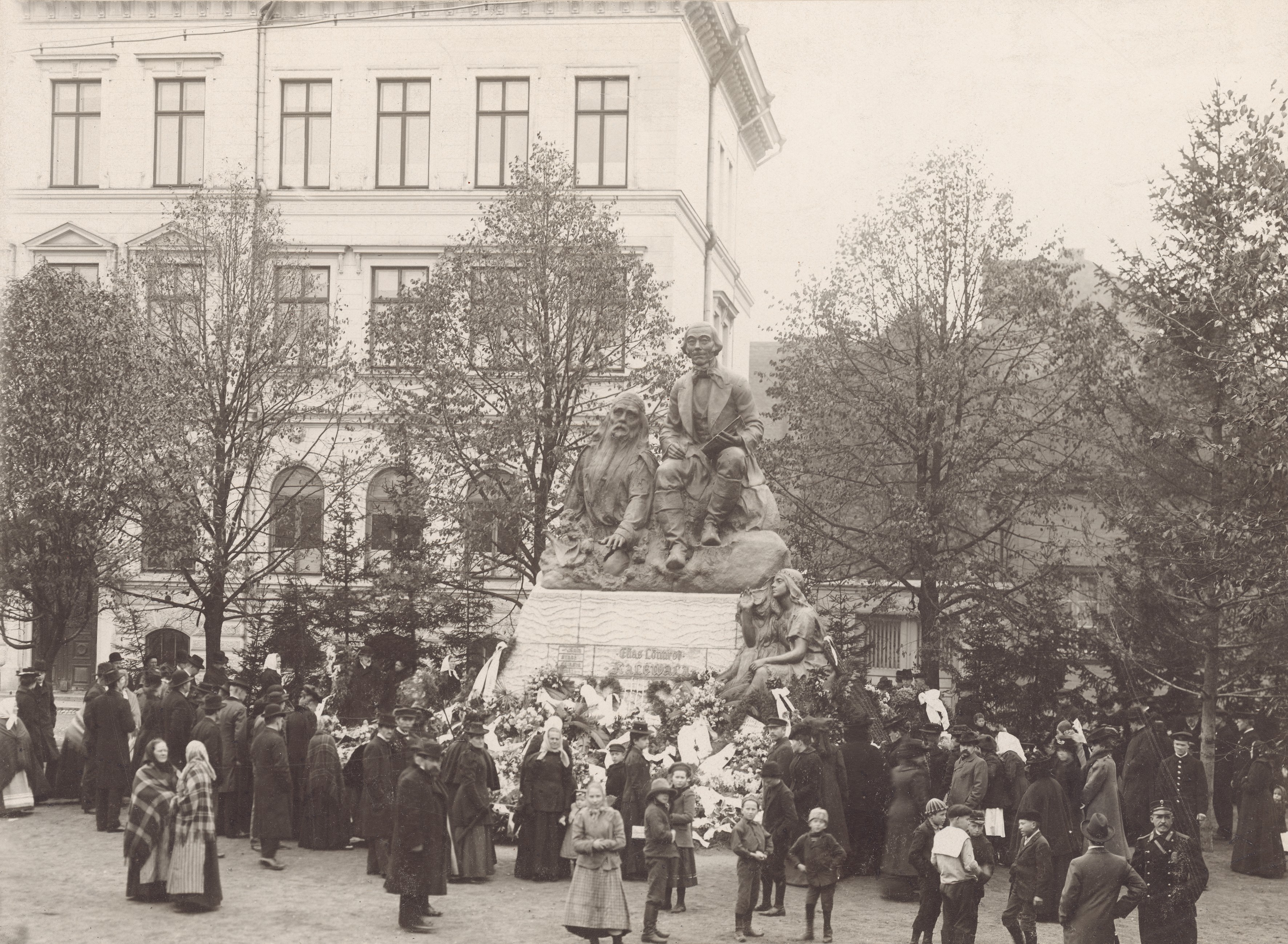
Statue of Elias Lönnrot by Emil Wikström on the day of its reveal

In the early 1900s, the Russian administration attempted to Russify Finland and to integrate it more closely into the Russian Empire. This policy faced broad resistance from the Finnish public. During this politically tense period, a statue of Elias Lönnrot by the sculptor Emil Wikström was erected in Helsinki. It depicts Lönnrot on a verse-collecting journey, writing in his notebook. Beside Lönnrot is the hero of Kalevala, Väinämöinen, and at the base of the monument's pedestal, the maiden Impi is selecting strands from her hair for a kantele.

Since the Russian authorities sought to suppress expressions of national identity, no public unveiling ceremony was held. Instead, the statue was revealed in the dark of night on 18 October 1902. The statue soon became a symbol of passive resistance. In the following days, numerous wreaths were placed at the monument, and silent crowds gathered around it. A procession to the statue would later become a central part of Kalevala Day celebrations.

On the 60th anniversary of the New Kalevala in 1909, some parties voiced concern that the work was being forgotten. In response, the Young Finnish Party (Nuorsuomalaiset) began promoting the idea of an annual celebration. Among the advocates were the poet Eino Leino and the linguist Eemil Nestor Setälä. That year, university students observed the anniversary with a torchlit procession to Elias Lönnrot's statue, where they paid tribute to him. Smaller celebrations were organized in towns across Finland. The event was promoted as an alternative to Runeberg Day, observed on 5 February. This reflected the then-ongoing language strife in Finland between Swedish and Finnish speakers. While Johan Ludvig Runeberg wrote in Swedish and was associated with Swedish cultural elite, the Kalevala was distinctly Finnish, and it was championed by the Fennomans.

During the 1910s, the Finnish Alliance (Suomalaisuuden Liitto) and various youth associations organized Kalevala Day celebrations across the country. The 75th anniversary of the Old Kalevala in 1910 was especially popular, with nearly ten thousand people attending the ceremonies. In the latter part of the decade, both Swedish- and Finnish-speaking students took part in the procession to Lönnrot's statue, reflecting a period of reduced linguistic tension between the two language groups. The following year, Kalevala Day coincided with Shrove Tuesday (Finnish: Laskiainen), and only a few dozen people attended the celebrations at Lönnrot's statue. The celebrations resumed in 1912 and became an established tradition.

=== From independence to the Continuation War ===
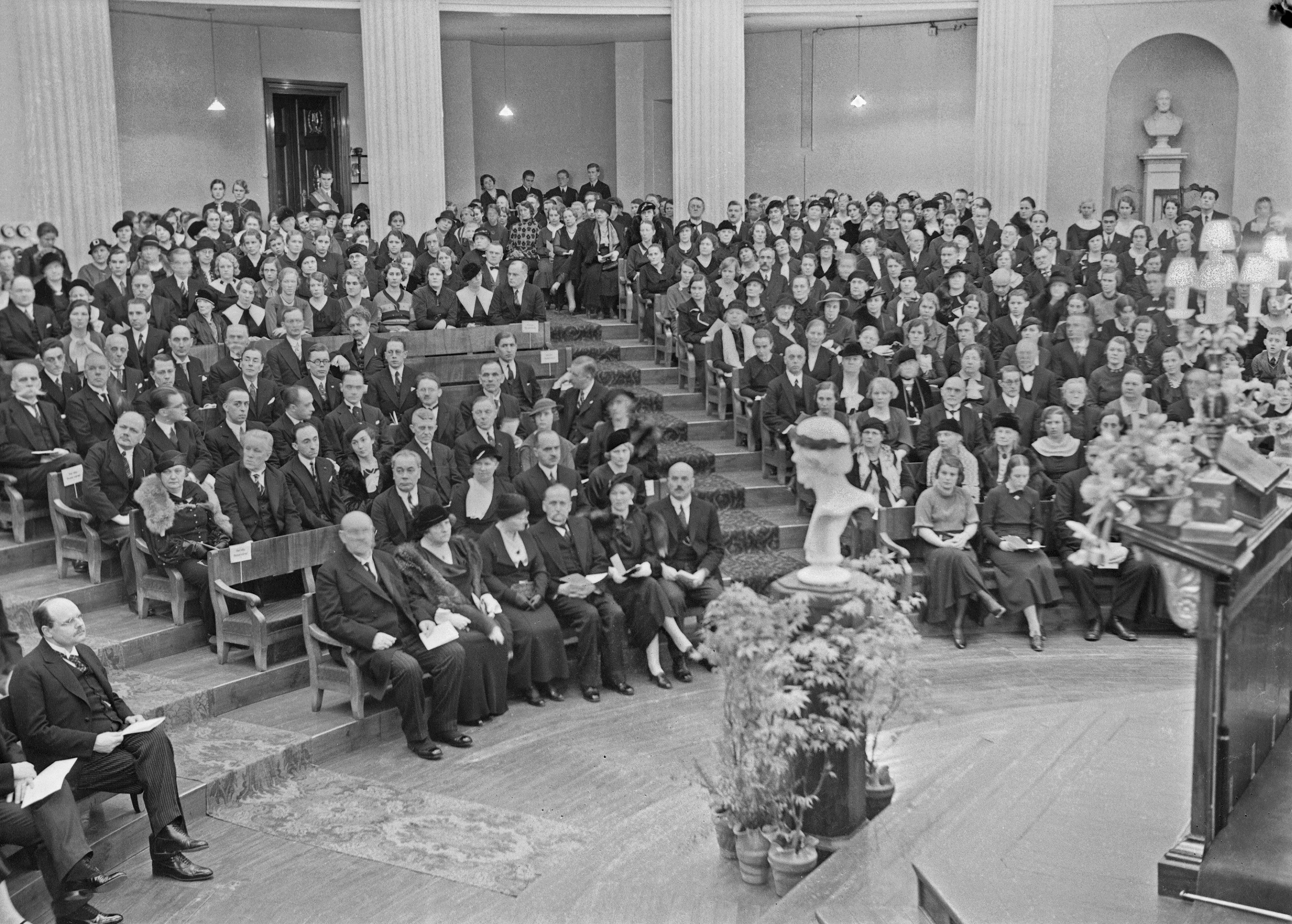
100th anniversary celebration of the Old Kalevala in the ballroom of the University of Helsinki

After Finland's Declaration of Independence in 1917, nationalism surged, and there was renewed interest in Kalevala. Throughout the 1920s and 1930s, various organizations—including schools, youth associations, and local chapters of the Marthas, Lotta Svärd, and the White Guard—organized Kalevala Day celebrations across the country. Left-wing groups typically did not observe Kalevala Day. During this period, many celebrations featured right-wing themes, such as pan-Finnicism and aggressive Karelianism. However, there were also Kalevala celebrations that adopted a more humanistic and pacifist tone.

The Kalevala Society (Kalevalaseura), officially founded in 1919, played a central role in organizing and promoting Kalevala Day celebrations from 1920 onward. It took responsibility for sending out programs for schools and cultural organizations, and for public education initiatives. In Helsinki, the society began hosting an academic gathering featuring a program of speeches, music, and performances. The daytime ceremonies included a visit to the statue of Elias Lönnrot, which had been decorated with flowers for the occasion. The largest Kalevala event took place in 1935, marking the 100th anniversary of the Old Kalevala. The festivities lasted for four days and were organized by the Kalevala Society and other associations, with support from the state.

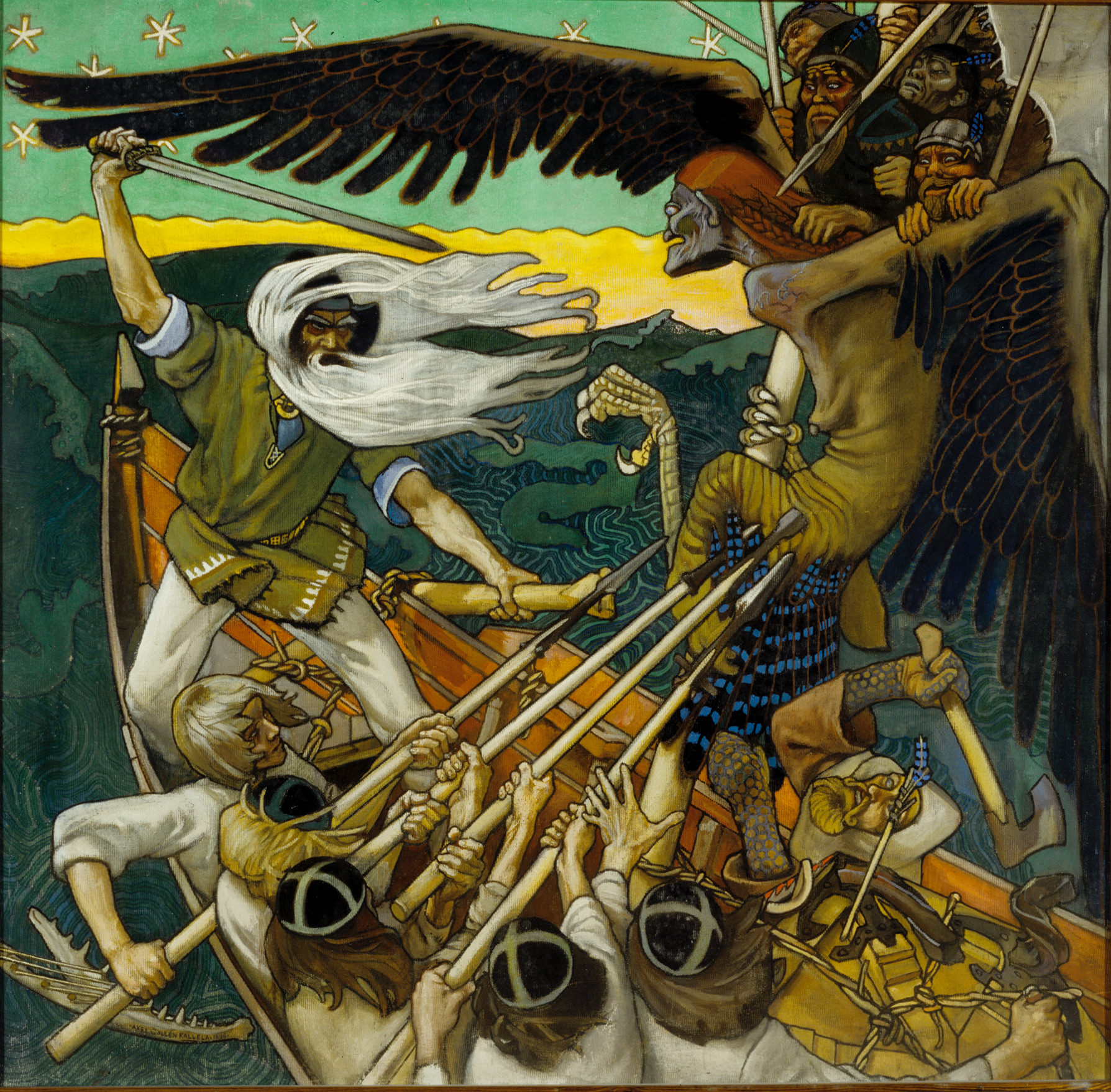
Louhi, Mistress of the North, attacking Väinämöinen in the form of a giant eagle, with her troops on her back. (The Defense of the Sampo, Akseli Gallen-Kallela, 1896)

In 1941, prior to the start of the Continuation War, Kalevala Day was celebrated in Helsinki Exhibition Hall as a "Kalevala–Karelia" event. The speeches and newspaper articles from that time adopted an aggressive tone, using Kalevala to justify the impending war. After Finland's defeat, Kalevala was reinterpreted and used as a source of more peaceful material.

=== Post-war events ===
In 1949, large celebrations were again held to mark the 100th anniversary of the New Kalevala. Different political groups now sought to claim it as part of their own symbolic heritage. This resulted in two separate events being organized: one by the Kalevala Society and another by the left-wing Finnish People's Democratic League. Earlier that year, Finnish-born Soviet politician Otto Kuusinen had published a new edition of Kalevala, featuring a Marxist introduction. In it, Kuusinen rejected Lönnrot's bourgeois theories regarding the origin and age of the verses and emphasized that Kalevala was based on Karelian, rather than Finnish, poetry.

During Matti Kuusi's tenure as chairman of the Kalevala Society (1963–1975), the focus of Kalevala Day celebrations shifted. Nationalistic elements were scaled back, and the format of the event became more diverse. During this period, the celebrations were organized in the form of cultural theme weeks, which changed each year. These included "Vernacular week", "Finnish landscape week", "Sámi week", "Folk song week", and "Karelian culture week". These events were held in various cities across Finland and aimed to appeal to different audiences. The transformation into themed cultural weeks allowed the celebrations to engage with contemporary cultural issues and to provide a platform for the exploration of Finnish traditions, arts, and education. After Kuusi's tenure, the theme weeks were discontinued.

Kalevala Day had become an established flag-flying day as early as the 1920s. Its status was confirmed in 1952, when it was added to the flag day list in the Finnish almanac. The flag-flying day was confirmed by decree in 1978, when it was also given the additional epithet "Finnish Culture Day", reflecting the evolution from a celebration of Kalevala to that of Finnish culture more broadly.

Extensive celebrations took place during the 150th anniversary of the Old Kalevala in 1985, with 500 events distributed throughout the year. During the 150th anniversary of the New Kalevala in 1999, celebrations expanded abroad, with over 700 events held in Finland and 42 other countries.

== See also ==
- Kalevi (mythology)
