= Emilie Björkstén =

Finnish poet (1823–1896)

- Born: July 26, 1823; Kangasniemi, Finland
- Died: January 15, 1896 (aged 72)
- Occupation: Poet
- Writing career
- Pen name: e ***

Arkadia Emilie Björkstén (July 26, 1823 – January 15, 1896) was a 19th-century Finnish poet, often writing under the pen name e ***. She published four well-received books of poetry between 1864 and 1886. Her work was deeply influenced by the 19th-century Finnish poet Johan Ludvig Runeberg, with whom she had a long romantic affair, beginning when she was a teenager.

== Early life ==
Emilie Björkstén was born in 1823 in Kangasniemi, a town in central Finland. After being orphaned at a young age, she began to move from place to place and stay with different relatives around the country.

== Relationship with Johan Ludvig Runeberg ==
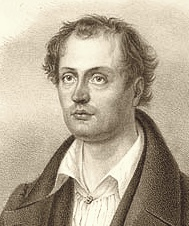
The Finnish poet Johan Ludwig Runeberg in 1837, shortly before he and Björkstén met.

While living in Porvoo at age 15, Björkstén met the Finnish national poet Johan Ludvig Runeberg, who was nearly 20 years her senior. The two began a romantic relationship, and the successful older poet also served as a literary inspiration and mentor to Björkstén. The height of their emotional affair was between 1846 and 1849, but they remained linked throughout their lives.

While their relationship did cause a stir, it was tempered by Johan's wife Fredrika Runeberg's reaction, which was to accept the affair and befriend Björkstén. A poet herself, Fredrika also became a mentor to the young writer, becoming the first person to read her poetry. The two women's work went on to contain similar symbolic elements, and they also shared a common aim of improving women's status in Finland.

Björkstén continued to move from one relative's house to another throughout her adult life, but she stayed in touch with the Runebergs, and when Johan became paralyzed in 1863 she returned to help care for him. Like Fredrika, Emilie is said to have put up with an "astonishing amount of bad behavior" from Johan over the course of their relationship.

== Writing ==
Björkstén published several books of poetry, including her well-received debut Sandperlor (1864); Drottningar (1867), which was based on the stories of various famous women; and the largely religious collection De sista (1886). After Johan Runeberg died in 1877, she dedicated the poetry collection Ännu en gång, published later that year, to his widow, "with humility and respect."

Björkstén herself never married, nor did she ever settle in one place permanently or work a steady job. In addition to her poetry, she published a memoir, Några Minnen, in 1871. Mosaiker, an anthology she edited of work by women poets, including Fredrika Runeberg and Wilhelmina Nordström, was published in 1874. She also wrote stories for children and worked as a translator from English.

Her writing was usually published under the pen name e ***, although contemporary readers would have likely understood her identity regardless.

== Death and legacy ==
Björkstén died in 1896. Her letters with the Runebergs and excerpts from her diaries were published posthumously in the 20th century, with her letters with Johan in particular causing a stir when they were first published in 1940.

In 1939, an early Finnish costume film directed by Toivo Särkkä, Runon kuningas ja muuttolintu ("The King of Poets and the Bird of Passage"), depicted the love story between Runeberg and Björkstén, and it became a massive box-office success.

== Selected works ==
=== Poetry ===
- Sandperlor (1864)
- Drottningar (1867)
- Mosaiker (anthology, editor and contributor, 1874)
- Ännu en gång (1877)
- De sista (1886)

=== Memoir ===
- Några Minnen (1871)
