= Fredrik Ekberg =

Finnish pastry chef and baker (1825–1891)

Fredrik Edvard Ekberg (29 June 1825 – 10 April 1891) was a Finnish pastry chef and baker who founded Café Ekberg in Helsinki. He is said to have created Finland's "national pastry tradition".

== Biography ==
Born in Helsinki, the orphaned Fredrik Edvard Ekberg was the foster son of a bank clerk. He originally intended to become a watchmaker but eventually became a journeyman baker. During his journey in the 1840s, he visited St. Petersburg, the Baltics and Vyborg.

Ekberg opened his first bakery in 1852 in Kruununhaka, Helsinki, which moved four years later to the Kiseleffska building on Aleksanterinkatu. The restaurant Café Parisien, which Ekberg opened in 1873 in the pastry shop on Aleksanterinkatu 52, can be seen as the highlight of his business. It operated on Aleksanterinkatu until 1917. He opened a business on Bulevardi in 1915, where the family business is still in operation in the fourth generation.

Ekberg spoke Swedish as his mother tongue. He married Eleonora Wilhelmina Österman in 1857 and Johanna Carolina Elisabeth De Geer in 1867. Ekberg died at the age of 65 in Helsinki in 1891.

== Literature ==
- L. Ekberg, Firman Fredr. Edv. Ekberg 1852−1952 (1952)
- Rafael Hertzberg, Helsingfors för trehundra år sedan och i våra dagar (1888)
- Bo Lönnqvist, Bakelser i Helsingfors. Narinkka 1986−1987
- Bo Lönnqvist, Bakelser. En studie i lyxens kulturella formspråk (1997)
- August Schauman, Nu och förr (1886).
