= Anette Reuterskiöld =

Finnish writer (1804–1880)

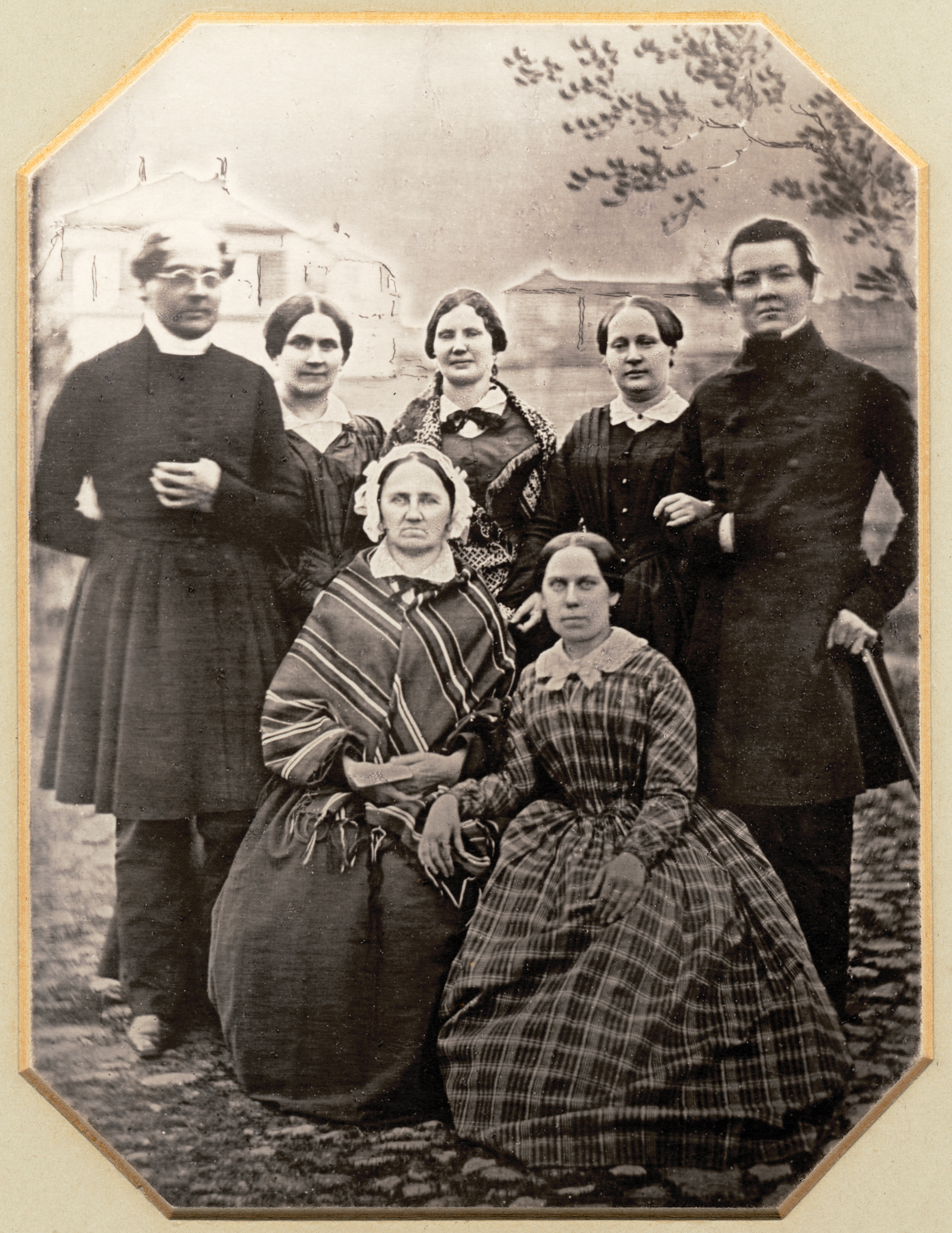
- Anette Reuterskiöld with the Runebergs and their friends (third from the left in the top row). Image from the image collection of the SKS Runeberg library.
- Born: Anna Beata Sofia Reuterskiöld; 16 April 1804; Sveaborg, Finland, Kingdom of Sweden
- Died: 25 December 1880 (aged 76); Borgå, Grand Duchy of Finland, Russian Empire
- Occupation: Writer

Anna Beata Sofia "Anette" Reuterskiöld (Finland Swedish: [ɑˈnetː ˈrøjterˌʃøld]; 16 April 1804 – 25 December 1880) was a Finnish writer and socialite.

She is mentioned in the biographical register published by the Finnish Women's Association in 1896 thanks to an unpublished play she wrote about Finnish women in various fields of work. She was a close friend of Fredrika Runeberg.

== Literature ==
- Intima interiörer: hundra brev från Fredrika and J.L. Runeberg samt andra vänner till Emilie Björkstén. Helsinki: Akateeminen Kirjakauppa, 1938. (in Swedish)
- Mäkelä-Alitalo, Anneli: History of the city of Porvoo III:1, 1809–1878. Porvoo: City of Porvoo, 2000.
- Runeberg, Fredrika, Karin Allardt Ekelund (ed.): Brev till sonen Walter 1861 – 1879 : Köpenhamn, Rom, Paris. Skrifter utgivna av Svenska litteratursällskapet i Finland. SLS, 1971. (in Swedish)
