= Runeberg torte =

Finnish cake with almonds and rum or arrack

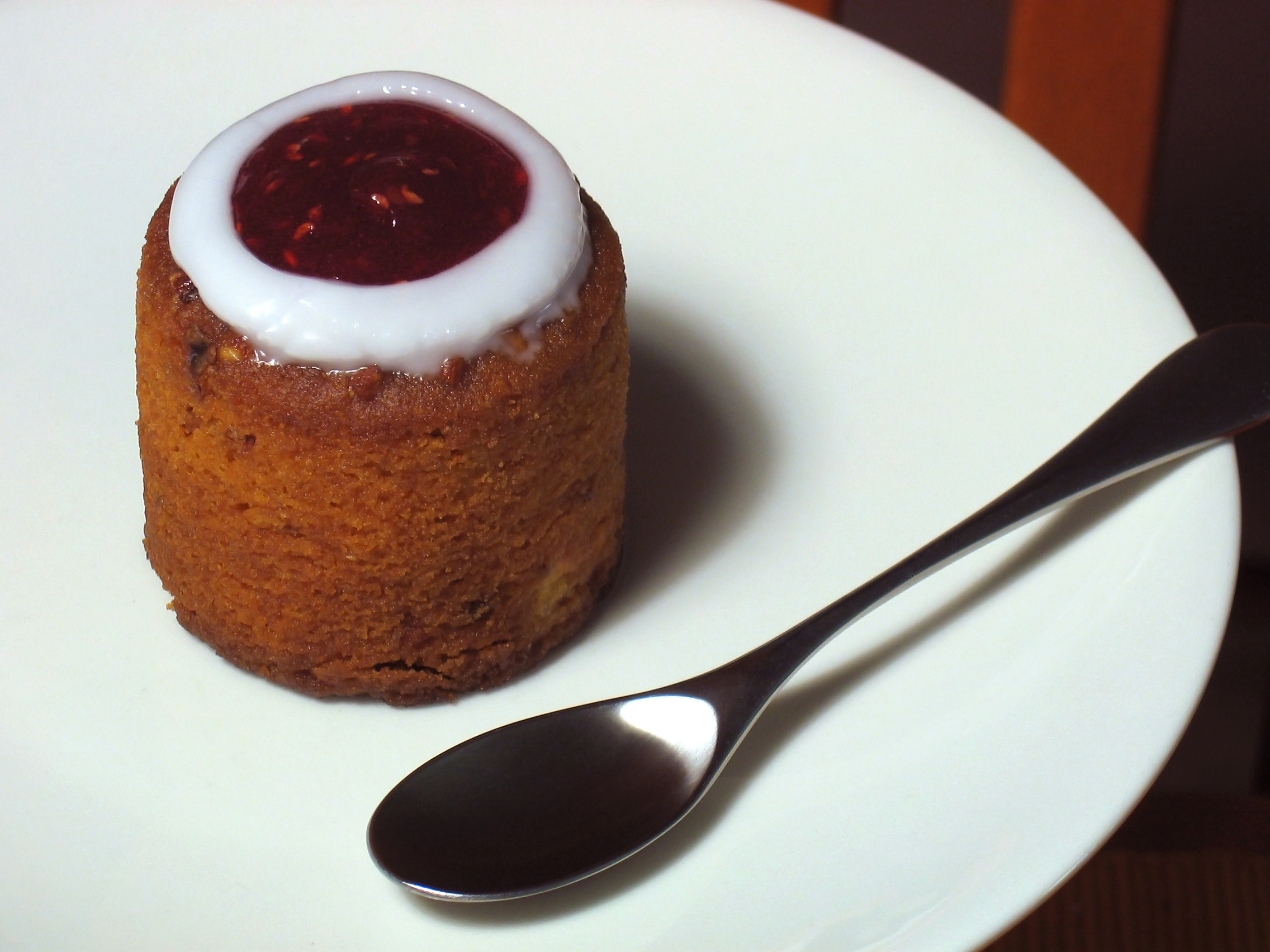
- Fazer's Runeberg torte
- Type: Torte
- Course: Dessert
- Place of origin: Porvoo, Finland
- Associated cuisine: Finnish
- Created by: Fredrika Runeberg
- Invented: 1850s
- Main ingredients: Flour, bread crumbs, Almond meal, rum or arrack, raspberry jam, sugar

Runeberg torte (Finnish: runebergintorttu [ˈruːneberinˌtortːu]; Swedish: runebergstårta) is a Finnish torte flavored with almonds and arrack or rum and weighing about 100 grams. It usually has raspberry jam encircled by a ring of icing on top.

The torte is named after the Finnish poet Johan Ludvig Runeberg (1804–1877) who, according to legend, regularly enjoyed the torte, made by his wife, with punsch for breakfast. Runeberg tortes are typically eaten only in Finland and are generally available in stores from the beginning of January to Runeberg Day on February 5; however, Porvoo, where Runeberg lived for most of his life, is an exception, as in some of its cafés tortes are available every day of the year.

== History ==
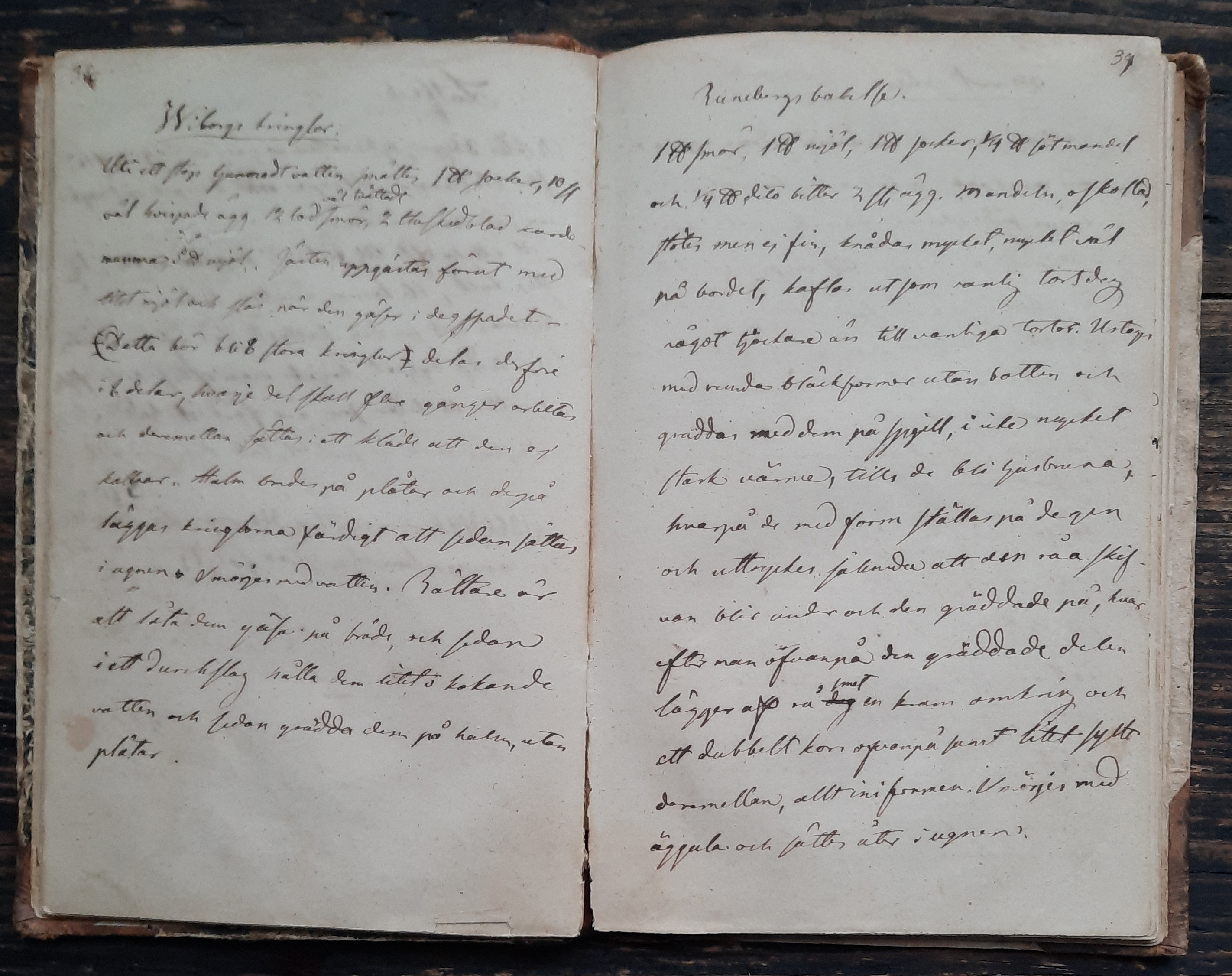
Fredrika Runeberg's original recipe from 1850s for "Runebergsbakelse"

Popular legend says that Runeberg's wife, Fredrika Runeberg, created the dessert. Her recipe book from the 1850s has a recipe for the torte, believed to be a variation of an earlier recipe by confectioner Lars Astenius from Porvoo. The torte was popularized by Fredrik Edvard Ekberg, who began selling it at Café Ekberg in Helsinki in 1865.

== In popular culture ==
In "A Wife-Changing Experience", the third episode of the 21st season of Family Guy series, the Runeberg torte is mentioned, and even Peter Griffin explains that it was named after J. L. Runeberg.
