= Kalevala House =

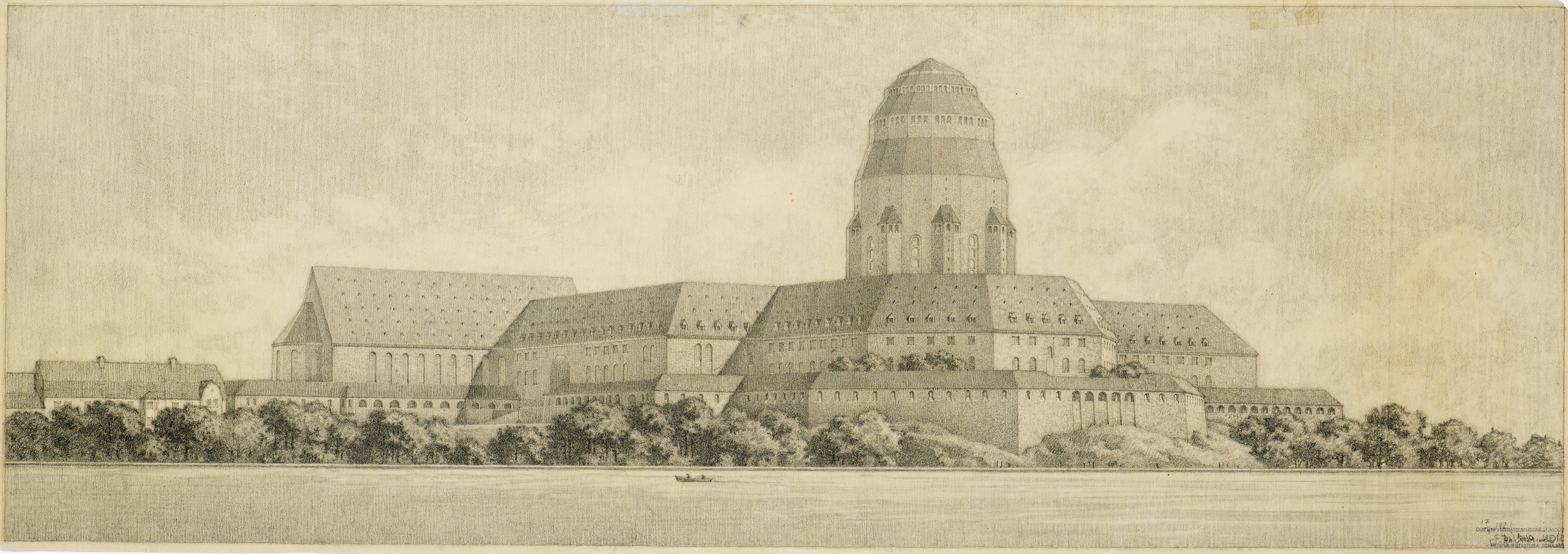
Sketch drawing of the northwestern side of the Kalevala House by Eliel Saarinen from 1921.

The Kalevala House (Finnish: Kalevalatalo) was a proposed monumental building in Helsinki, Finland, intended to serve as the headquarters of the Kalevala Society and a center of Finnish culture. The plans included a Finnish cultural research institute, exhibition spaces, artists' workspaces and "research chambers". Additionally, the crypt beneath the foot of the 80-meter-high main tower was to serve as a burial place for notable Finnish figures and Fennomen. The building was to be located at the top of Munkkiniemi, near the present-day Hotel Kalastajatorppa.

Kalevalapiha, a planned courtyard of the Kalevala House

The construction of its own house had been part of the Kalevala Society's plans since its establishment in 1911. The project was driven especially by the sculptor Alpo Sailo, one of the society's founding members. In 1921, architect Eliel Saarinen drafted grand plans for the Kalevala House. However, the painter Akseli Gallen-Kallela, a key figure in the society, began to oppose the project after Saarinen's drawings were completed, possibly fearing it would compete for funding with his own major project, the Greater Kalevala (Suur-Kalevala). Before long, the majority of the society's board also turned against the expensive project. The requirement to build the society's own house remained in its rules until the early 2000s.

== National "Kalevala religion" in the 20th century ==
Admiration of the Kalevala and Kalevala culture led to outright worship of the Kalevala in the early 20th century. In the true sense of the word, a national Kalevala religion was being created. It culminated in the construction project of the huge Kalevala House, the "Finnish Panthéon", during the interwar period. The initiative was taken in 1911 by the sculptor Alpo Sailo (1877–1955). Its altar would have been the Great Kalevala, a monumental giant book commissioned from Akseli Gallen-Kallela, each page of which would have been a magnificent painting. Sailo described:

Above all, the house comes with a sense of holiness. Let it rise in the middle of the holy park, fenced from the rest of the world. Let it be adorned with statues depicting our ancient gods and heroes. (...) what is most precious to the people is preserved here, and that the spirit of our people is here in all its glory.

There would have been a crypt under the house, a "tuonela" in which the great men of the nation would have been buried. Eliel Saarinen, a prominent architect of the National Romantic period, drew up the magnificent plans for the Kalevala House in 1921. At this point, however, the project failed because Gallen-Kallela considered Saarinen's drawings too unnational. The idea was reheated in the jubilee of the Kalevala in 1935. At that time, Alpo Sailo commented on the house:

Absolutely no functionalism (...), it must be a Finnish building in all respects.

This civic religion thus contained a very strong conservative charge. However, due to a lack of financial resources, the Kalevala House never went beyond the drawings.

In the 20th century, it was very typical to seek support for political passions from folk poetry. In the aftermath of national romance, the heroic types of Kalevala poems were admired, and the Kalevala was claimed to be essentially a war epic. In this spirit, the armored ships ordered for the Finnish Navy were named after Väinämöinen and Ilmarinen (1930–1931).

The Kalevala house, which rises to a height of more than 80 meters, was to be located in Munkkiniemi, where Sigurd Stenius, the owner of the area, had already promised it a plot of land.
