= Fredrika Wenman =

Finnish poet (1803–1873)

- Born: 22 September 1803 Central Ostrobothnia, Finland
- Died: 9 August 1873 (aged 69) Kronoby
- Occupation: Writer

Frederika (Friga) Wenman (22 September 1803 Central Ostrobothnia – 9 August 1873 Kronoby) was a Finnish rural poet who wrote in Swedish.

== Early life and career ==
Wenman's parents were Frederick Julius and Ulrika Christina Cullen, regents of Kronunkyla. In 1845 she married Frederic Wilhelm Wanman, assistant priest of Croonunkilla.

Wenman met Johan Ludvig Runeberg at a school in Vaasa. Runeberg dedicated his poem to Frigga. However, the courtship ended when Runeberg left to study at the Royal Academy of Turku in 1823. Fredrika published her poems under the pseudonym F in Vasabladet magazine.

At the age of almost 70, Wenman published her only poetry collection under the pseudonym F..a. Runeberg gave Wenman financial help through a relative who helped publish the collection. This collection contained religious ideas and glorified the ideals of Wanman's youth (Runeberg).

== Works ==
- Bleka blommor. omakustanne, Nikolaistad 1870
