= Arrack =

South and Southeast Asian alcoholic drink

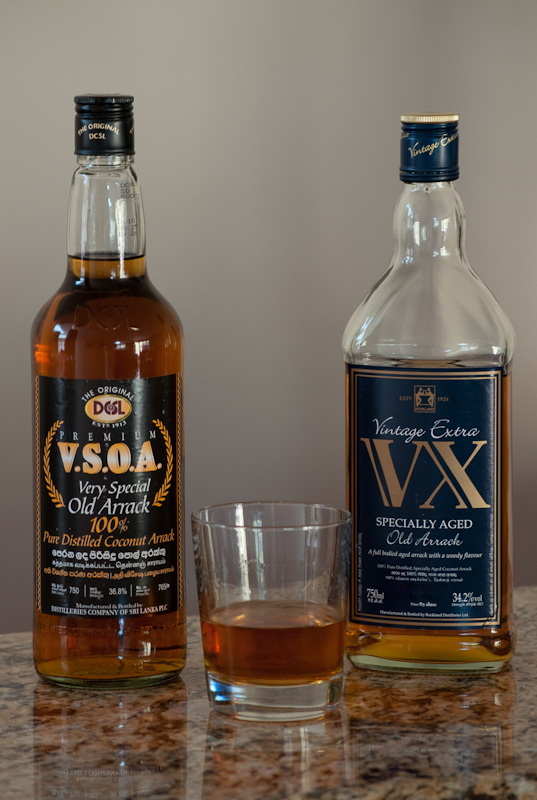
- Two kinds of arrack from Sri Lanka
- Type: Alcoholic drink
- Origin: Indian subcontinent and Southeast Asia
- Alcohol by volume: 33–50%
- Proof (US): 66–100°
- Color: Golden brown
- Ingredients: Fermented coconut sugar or sugarcane

Arrack is a distilled alcoholic drink typically produced in India, Sri Lanka, and Southeast Asia, made from the fermented sap of coconut flowers or sugarcane, and also with grain (e.g., red rice) or fruit depending upon the country of origin. It is sometimes spelled arak, or simply referred to as 'rack or 'rak. In Keralam, coconut blossom arrack is called "chaaraayam" in Malayalam. In some Northern parts of India, sugarcane arrack is colloquially called "desi daru" in Hindi.

There are two primary styles of arrack that are very different from one another: Batavia arrack is often clear in color but has a flavor profile more similar to dark rum, with a distinctive "funk" or "hogo" imparted to it from fermented red rice. Sri Lankan (Ceylon) arrack, by contrast, is a more refined and subtle spirit. It has hints of cognac and rum character and a wealth of delicate floral notes. Both styles are also made "in-house" by local citizenry and can be more akin to moonshine in their presentation.

== Etymology ==
The word derived from the Arabic word arak (عرق, ʿaraq), meaning 'distillate'. In the Eastern Mediterranean, the term arak is usually used for liquor distilled from grapes and flavored with anise.

The word "arrack" has been considered by some experts to be derived from areca nut, a palm seed originating in India from the areca tree and used as the basis for many varieties of arrack. In 1838, Samuel Morewood's work on the histories of liquors was published. On the topic of arrack, he wrote that "The word arrack is decided by philologers to be of Indian origin; and should the conjecture be correct, that it is derived from the areca-nut, or the arrack-tree, as Kaempfer calls it, it is clear, that as a spirit was extracted from that fruit, the name was given to all liquors having similar intoxicating effects." He goes on to explain that the word areca comes from the Telinga dialect of Sanskrit, which means that "the term areca, or arrack," used throughout the region, "may be fairly traced" back to India. He notes several examples of the word and its derivatives among other ethnic groups: the Tungusians, Calmucks, and Kirghizes use the terms "arrack" or "rak", and the Ossetians "applied the word 'Arak' to denote all distilled liquors".

== History ==
Strabo reports Indians made a beverage from rice known as arak. Arrack predates all "New World" spirits, as it is a parent to cachaça (which was, in turn, the parent of rum, rhum agricole, and ron). Genoese merchants made the spirit as a byproduct of their sugar cane production in the Canary Islands. In addition to making sugar, they produced arrack instead of importing it for their growing list of customers. Other early arrack was distilled from molasses and water, using dried cakes of red rice and botanicals that contained yeast and other fungi to trigger the fermentation process (this technique can be traced back thousands of years to China and even predates the birth of distillation). It is also claimed to have been distilled in India in 800 BCE, but while palm wine and fermented sugarcane drinks were being made around this time, not all believe that formal distillation was taking place.

Outside Asia, the spirit was a common ingredient in the proliferation of Indian alcoholic punch, and was particularly popular in Holland and Sweden. It was the first distilled spirit consumed in colonial America, in the colonies of New Sweden and New Netherland, but is now mostly confused with the more common and similar spelled anise-flavored spirit arak.

Regardless of the exact origin, arrack has come to symbolize a multitude of largely unrelated, distilled alcohols produced throughout Asia and the eastern Mediterranean. This is largely due to the proliferation of distillation knowledge throughout the Middle East during the 14th century. Each country named its own alcohol by using various Latin alphabet forms of the same word that was synonymous with distillation at the time (arak, araka, araki, ariki, arrack, arack, raki, raque, racque, rac, rak). 1864 English and Australian Cookery Book described arrack as "a spirituous liquor from the East Indies. This term, or its corruption, rack, is applied to any spirituous liquor in the East. The true arrack is said to be distilled from toddy, the fermented juice of the coconut flower. It is however, frequently distilled from rice and sugar, fermented with the cocoa-nut juice."

== Arrack in different countries ==
=== India ===
Arrack was banned in the states of Kerala in 1996, and Karnataka on 1 July 2007.

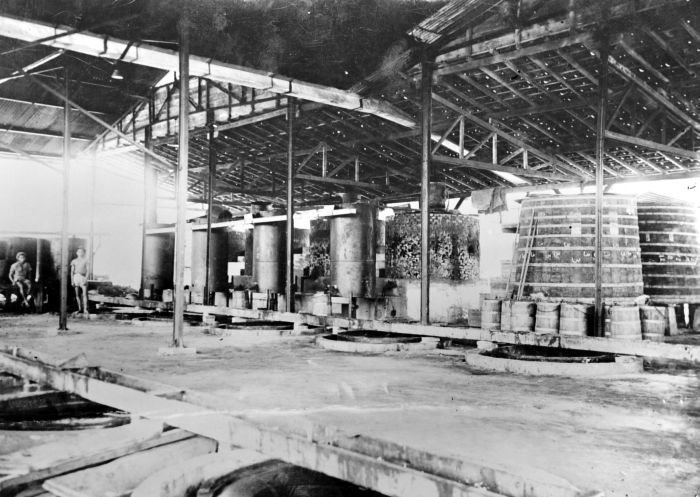
Batavian arrack factory "Aparak" in 1948

=== Indonesia (Batavia) arrack ===
Within Indonesia itself, the term arak is still widely used to describe arrack. Arak (or rice wine) was a popular alcoholic beverage during the colonial era. It is considered the "rum" of Indonesia because, like rum, it is distilled from sugarcane. It uses pot still distillation. To start the fermentation, local fermented red rice is combined with local yeast to give a unique flavor and smell of the distillate. It is distilled to approximately 70% ABV. Like rum, Batavia-arrack is often a blend of different original parcels.

One of the longest established arrack companies in Indonesia is the Batavia Arak Company (Dutch Batavia-Arak Maatschappij), which was already in business by 1872, became a limited liability company in 1901, and was still operating in the early 1950s. The Batavia Arak Company also exported arrack to the Netherlands and had an office in Amsterdam. Some of the arrack brands produced by Batavia Arak Company were KWT (produced in the Bandengan [Kampung Baru] area of old Jakarta) and OGL. Still commonly available in Northern Europe and Southern Asia, Batavia-arrack can be difficult to find in the United States. Batavia-Arrack van Oosten is a more recently available brand.

Batavia-arrack is said to enhance flavor when used as a component in other products, such as pastries (like the Finnish Runeberg torte or the Dresdner Stollen), or in the confectionery and flavor industries. It is used in herbal and bitter liqueurs, and as a component in alcoholic punches (such as punsch, regent punch, royal punch, and black tea-port milk punch).

Its use in punch was noted by early American bartender Jerry Thomas: "Most of the arrack imported into this country is distilled from rice, and comes from Batavia. It is but little used in America, except to flavor punch; the taste of it is very agreeable in this mixture. Arrack improves very much with age. It is much used in some parts of India, where it is distilled from toddy, the juice of the coconut tree".

In Indonesia, arrack is often created as a form of moonshine.

==== Methanol poisoning ====
Indonesian arrack containing methanol has caused both local and tourist deaths from methanol toxicity. Arrack plays a socially and culturally important role in Balinese society, where it is often diluted with water, shared with friends, or drunk in small quantities during religious ceremonies. However, with the growth of tourism, the need for cheap alcohol, and increases in alcohol import taxes and regulations, arrack became the spirit of choice for many mixed drinks in bars. With the growth in arrack production and popularity, more deaths from methanol poisoning were reported. Arrack is usually sold on the black market, without regulation, where methanol is sometimes added for economic reasons, or out of the assumption that it will be more potent.

=== Philippines ===
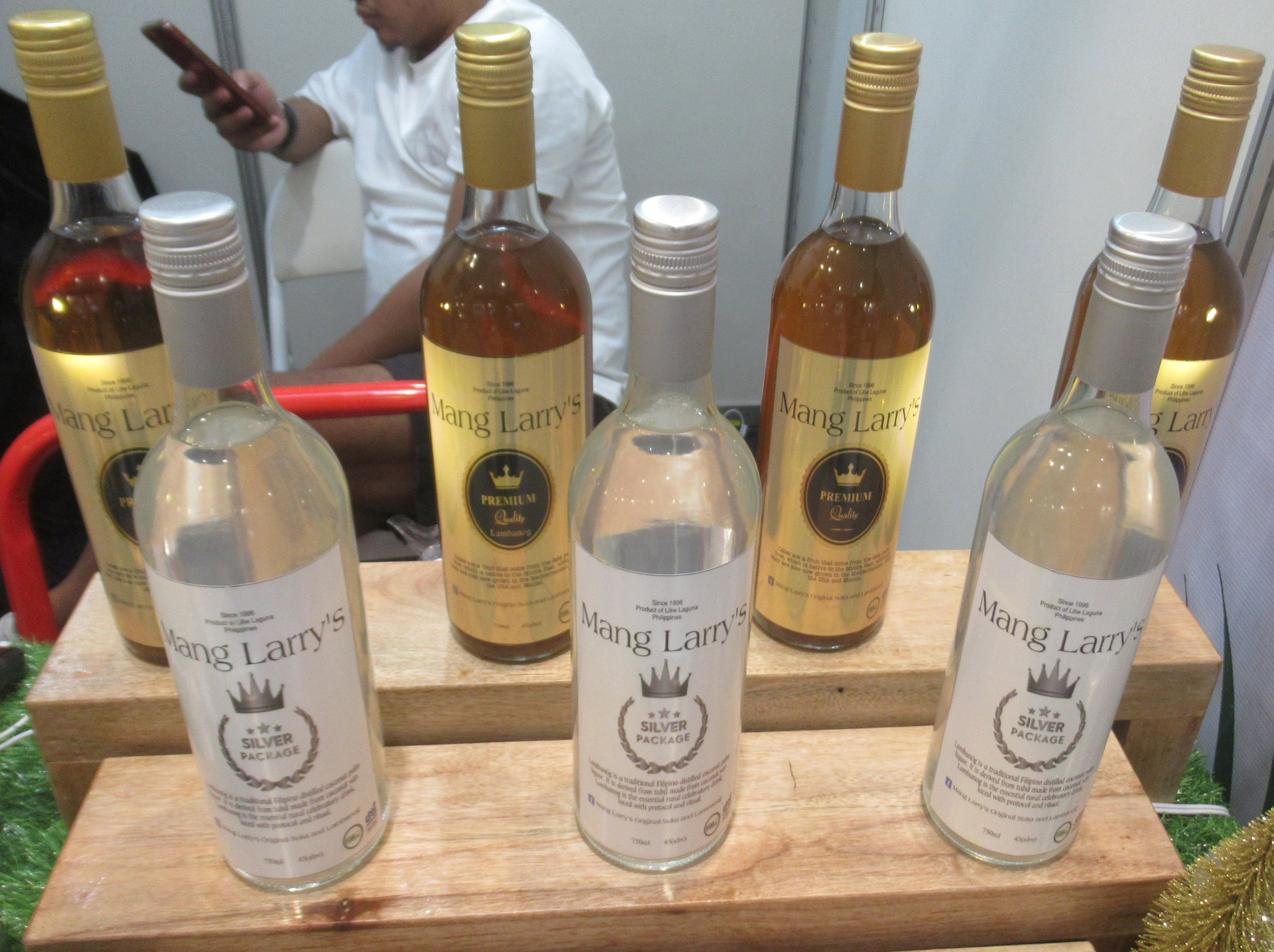
Lambanog, a palm liquor

A Filipino term for distilled and undistilled alcoholic drinks in general is alak, derived from the Arabic word ʿaraq. The term arak, though, is specifically used in Ilocano. It can be derived from palm sap (notably coconut, nipa palm, or kaong palm), sugarcane, or rice. Traditionally distilled native alcohols include lambanóg and laksoy, which are made from the sap of palm flowers. The sap is harvested into bamboo receptacles similar to rubber tapping, then cooked or fermented to produce a mildly-alcoholic coconut toddy called tubâ. The tubâ, which by itself is also a popular beverage, is further distilled to produce lambanóg (or laksoy, if made from nipa palm sap).

The Italian explorer Antonio Pigafetta stated that the arrack that he drank in Palawan and nearby islands in 1521 was made from distilled rice wine. However, he was likely referring to pangasi, an undistilled rice wine.

=== Sri Lanka (Ceylon) arrack ===
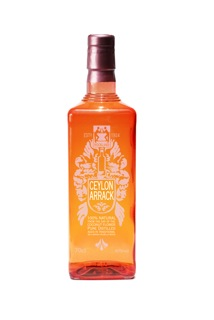
"Ceylon Arrack"

Sri Lanka is the largest producer of coconut arrack and, until 1992, the government played a significant role in its production.

Other than water, the entire manufacturing process revolves around the fermentation and distillation of a single ingredient, the sap of unopened flowers from a coconut palm (Cocos nucifera). Each morning at dawn, men known as toddy tappers move among the tops of coconut trees using connecting ropes not unlike tightropes.A single tree may contribute up to two litres per day.

Due to its concentrated sugar and yeast content, the captured liquid naturally and immediately ferments into a mildly alcoholic drink called "toddy", tuak, or occasionally "palm wine". Within a few hours after collection, the toddy is poured into large wooden vats, called "washbacks", made from the wood of teak or Berrya cordifolia. The natural fermentation process is allowed to continue in the washbacks until the alcohol content reaches 5–7% and deemed ready for distillation.

Distillation is generally a two-step process involving either pot stills, continuous stills, or a combination of both. The first step results in "low wine", a liquid with an alcohol content between 20 and 40%. The second step results in the final distillate with an alcohol content of 60 to 90%. It is generally diluted to between 33% and 50% alcohol by volume (ABV) or 66 to 100 proof. The entire distillation process is completed within 24 hours. Various blends of coconut arrack diverge in processing, yet the extracted spirit may also be sold raw, repeatedly distilled or filtered, or transferred back into halmilla vats for maturing up to 15 years, depending on flavour, colour and fragrance requirements.

Premium blends of arrack add no other ingredients, while the inexpensive and common blends are mixed with neutral spirits before bottling. Most people describe the taste as resembling "... a blend between whiskey and rum", similar, but distinctively different at the same time.

Coconut arrack is traditionally consumed by itself or with ginger beer, a popular soda in Sri Lanka. It also may be mixed in cocktails as a substitute for the required portions of either rum or whiskey. Arrack is often combined with popular mixers such as cola, soda water, and lime juice.

==== Production types ====
According to the Alcohol and Drug Information Centre's 2008 report on alcohol in Sri Lanka, the types of arrack are:

- Special arrack, which is produced in the highest volume, nearly doubling in production between 2002 and 2007.
- Molasses arrack is the least-processed kind and considered the common kind.

Nevertheless, as a whole, arrack is the most popular local alcoholic beverage consumed in Sri Lanka and produced as a wide variety of brands that fit into the following three categories:

- Premium aged, after distillation, is aged in halmilla vats for up to 15 years to mature and mellow the raw spirit before blending. Premium brands include Ceylon Arrack, VSOA, VX, Vat9, Old Reserve and Extra Special.
- Premium clear is generally not aged, but often distilled and/or filtered multiple times to soften its taste. Premium clear brands include Double Distilled and Blue Label.
- Common is blended with other alcohols produced from molasses or mixed with neutral spirits as filler.

==== Producers ====
Sri Lanka's largest manufacturers, listed in order based on their 2019 annual production of arrack, are:

- DCSL (Distilleries Company of Sri Lanka), 16.44 million litres
- IDL (International Distilleries Ltd), 1.61 million litres
- Rockland Distilleries (Pvt) Ltd, 1.18 million litres
- Acme Lanka Ltd, 0.92 million litres

Ceylon Arrack, a brand of Sri Lankan coconut arrack, was recently launched in the UK in 2010. It is also available in France and Germany. White Lion VSOA entered the American market soon after.

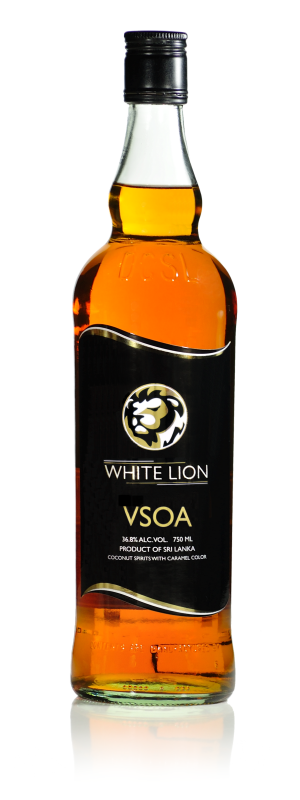
Coconut arrack for export

=== Saint Helena ===
Historically arrack has been a common beverage on the island of Saint Helena, distilled from potatoes. This is likely due to influences of the East India Company, which controlled Saint Helena and used it as a halfway point between India and England.

=== Sweden and Finland ===
In Sweden and Finland, Batavia-arrack has historically been mixed with other ingredients in order to make Swedish punsch (now available in prepackaged bottles). The alcohol content is normally not over 25%, although it has a high sugar content of nearly 30%. The original recipe was a mixture of arrack with water, sugar, lemon, and tea or spices (chiefly nutmeg). Today punsch is drunk warm (in Sweden) or cold (in Finland) as an accompaniment to yellow split pea soup (in Sweden) or green split pea soup (in Finland), or chilled as an after dinner drink accompanied with coffee (especially during dinner parties at student nations). It is used as a flavouring in several types of pastries and sweets as well. The name arrack is still retained for some pastries, for example arraksboll, whereas punsch is used for things like punschrulle. In Finland, arrack (or rum) usually serves as one of the ingredients in the making one of the Finnish traditional pastries, Runeberg tortes.

== See also ==
- Arak
- Feni (Urrak)
- List of Indonesian beverages
- Palm wine

== Cited works ==
- Dobbin, Christine E. (1996). Asian entrepreneurial minorities: conjoint communities in the making of the world-economy 1570-1940. Taylor & Francis. ISBN 978-0-7007-0404-0.
- Lopez, Robert S. (1990). Medieval Trade in the Mediterranean World. United States: Columbia University Press. ISBN 978-0-231-12357-0.
- Merrillees, Scott (2015). Jakarta: Portraits of a Capital 1950-1980. Jakarta: Equinox Publishing. ISBN 978-602-8397-30-8.
