= Kalevala Society =

Finnish foundation, established in 1911

- Kalevalaseura
- Formation: 1911; 115 years ago
- Headquarters: Helsinki, Finland
- Chairperson: Lotte Tarkka
- Website: kalevalaseura.fi

Kalevala Society (Finnish: Kalevalaseura) is a foundation established in 1911 with the mission of promoting scientific and artistic activities related to the Finnish cultural heritage and the Finnish national epic, Kalevala. The society organizes events, engages in publishing, research, and dissemination of information on these topics, and awards grants and recognition prizes. It invites Finnish and international experts in the Kalevala, cultural heritage, and Finnish culture to become members, and has, as of 2025, about 500 members. Many of the international members are translators or illustrators of the Kalevala.

== History ==
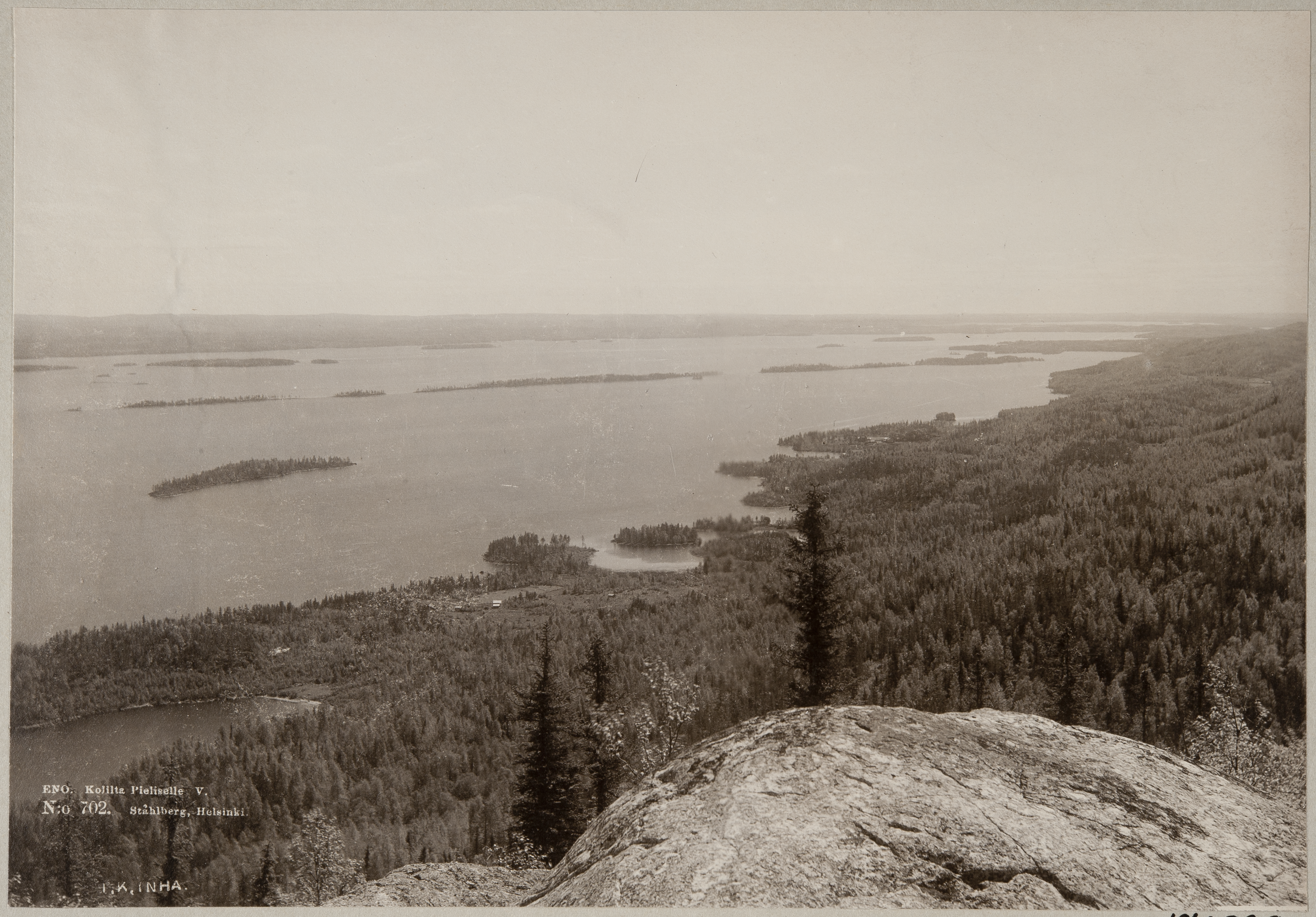
I. K. Inha's photograph from Koli towards Pielinen, in North Karelia, Finland

The ideological foundation of the society was Karelianism, a national romantic movement that idealized the region of Karelia, with its untouched landscapes and traditional villages. A large portion of the oral folklore that Elias Lönnrot used to compose the Kalevala was collected from Karelia in the 1830s and 1840s, and Karelia was regarded as both the cradle and a museum of ancient Finnish culture. Karelianism reached its peak in the 1890s and the early 1900s, a period later referred to as the Golden Age of Finnish Art. By the 1910s, Karelianism had fallen out of fashion. To revive the interest, the artist Akseli Gallen-Kallela, Senator E. N. Setälä, and dental professor Matti Äyräpää decided to form a society for those who believed in the symbolic value of the Kalevala, as well as the political and romantic significance of Karelia.

The Kalevala Society was founded in 1911, but its bylaws were officially approved by the Patent and Registration Office only in 1919. In addition to Gallen-Kallela, Setälä and Äyräpää, its founding members included the sculptor Alpo Sailo and the folk poetry researcher Väinö Salminen. The society’s primary objective, as established in 1911, was to promote collaboration between the arts and sciences related to Finnish oral folklore. There were also plans to create the monumental Kalevala House and the Great Kalevala , a lavishly decorated version of the Kalevala illustrated by Akseli Gallen-Kallela. However, neither of these projects was realized as originally envisioned.

In 1952, the society erected a statue of Elias Lönnrot in his hometown of Sammatti. The statue was based on a plaster model by Eemil Halonen.

The tenures of E. N. Setälä (1919–1935) and A.O. Väisänen (1942–1962) were marked by rivalry with the Finnish Literature Society. Despite this, the societies collaborated to organize the centennials of the Old Kalevala and the New Kalevala in 1935 and 1949, respectively. Since the 1960s, they have worked in close collaboration with each other and other related cultural societies. In 2024, the Kalevala Society donated its archives from 1919–2013 to the Finnish Literature Society.

== Yearbook and other publications ==
The Yearbook of the Kalevala Society is a peer-reviewed annual publication, first published in 1921, featuring primary research on the Kalevala, folk poetry, and other fields such as ethnology, linguistics, and archaeology. Before the 1970s, the Yearbook consisted of a collection of freely selected articles from scholars in various fields, without a specific thematic focus. Since 1971, the Yearbook has been organized around specific themes.

The first edition of the Kalevala Society Yearbook was published in 1921 by Otava. Yearbooks from 1922 to 1978 were published by WSOY. Since 1979 they have been published by the Finnish Literature Society. Starting with volume 100 in 2021, the Yearbook has been available both in hardcover and as an open access digital publication.

The book series Folklore Fellows’ Communications, established in 1907, has been published by the Kalevala Society since 2020.

== Chairpersons ==
- E. N. Setälä (1919–1935)
- Otto Manninen (1935–1937)
- Onni Okkonen (1937–1942)
- A. O. Väisänen (1942–1962)
- Matti Kuusi (1963–1975)
- Aimo Turunen (1975–1981)
- Pekka Laaksonen (1981–2007)
- Seppo Knuuttila (2007–2016)
- Pekka Hakamies (2016–2023)
- Lotte Tarkka (2023–)

== Sources ==
- Kalleinen, Kristiina (2011). Kansallisen tieteen ja taiteen puolesta (in Finnish). Helsinki: SKS & Kalevalaseura. ISBN 978-952-222-256-5.
- Anttonen, Pertti; Kuusi, Matti (1999). Kalevala-lipas. Helsinki: Suomalaisen Kirjallisuuden Seura. ISBN 951-746-045-7.
