= Café Ekberg =

Café in Helsinki, Finland

Coordinates: 60°09′53.00″N 24°56′16.04″E

Ekberg 1852 Oy Ab
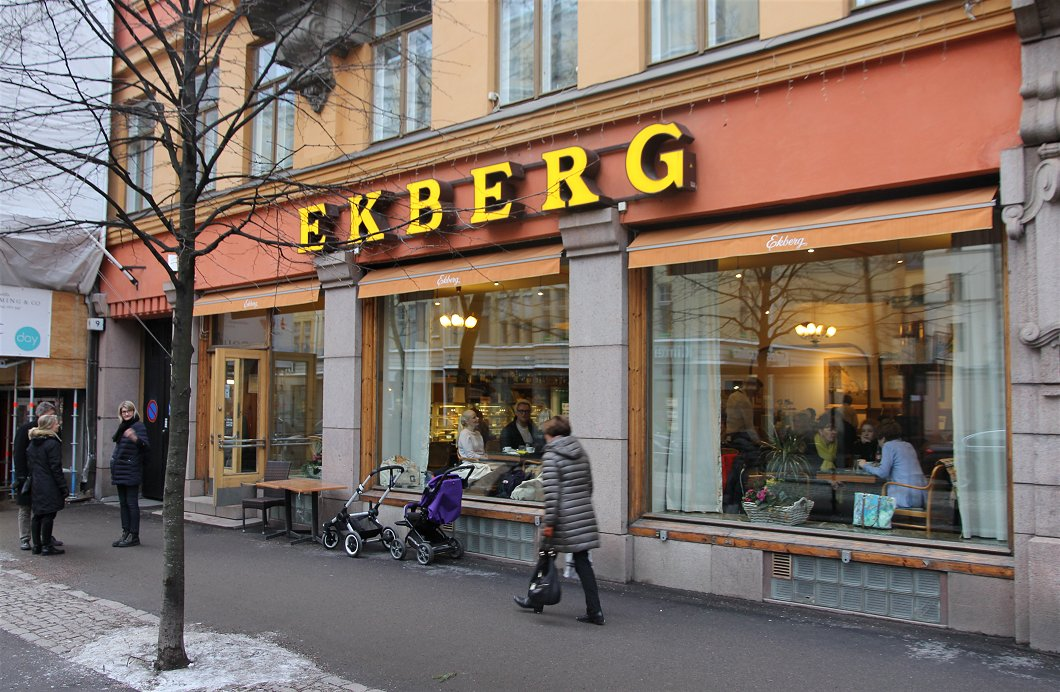
- Type: Private
- Founded: February 1852; 174 years ago
- Founder: Fredrik Edvard Ekberg
- Headquarters: Kamppi, Helsinki, Finland
- Owner: Ekberg family
- Website: www.ekberg.fi/en/

Ekberg (registered as Ekberg 1852 Oy Ab) is a café, pâtisserie and bakery shop on Bulevardi in Kamppi, Helsinki, Finland. It was founded by Fredrik Edvard Ekberg (1825–1891) in 1852, making it the oldest café still in operation in Finland.

Opening in Kruununhaka, it moved to Aleksanterinkatu. Ekberg moved to its current address at Bulevardi 9 in Helsinki in 1915. Examples of baked goods that have remained in Ekberg's range since the 19th century include the Napoleon cake, Krapfens and Runeberg tortes.

The interior of the café was renewed in 1951 and renovated in 2016. This latter renovation destroyed much of the cafe's original decor, receiving both condemnations from the locals and media attention.

== Ownership and management ==
Ekberg 1852 Oy Ab is a family-owned company managed by the fifth generation.

== See also ==
- Cafe Regatta
