= Armas Otto Väisänen =

Finnish ethnographer

Armas Otto Aapo Väisänen
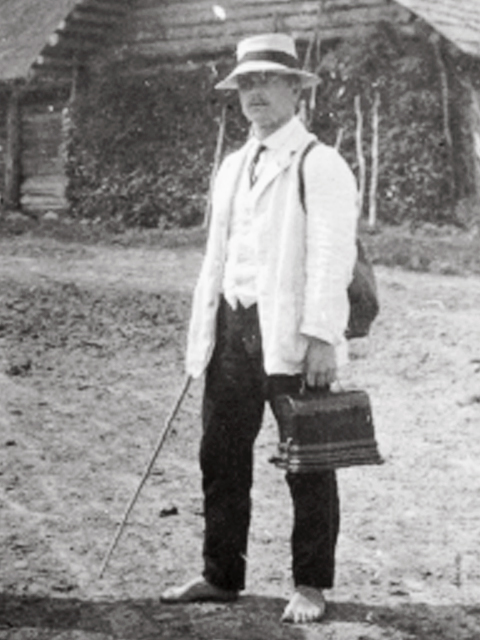
- Armas Otto Väisänen in 1913
- Born: 9 April 1890; Savonranta, Grand Duchy of Finland, Russian Empire
- Died: 18 July 1969 (aged 79); Helsinki, Finland
- Other names: A. O. Väisänen
- Occupation: scholar
- Known for: folk music

Armas Otto Aapo Väisänen (9 April 1890 – 18 July 1969) was an eminent Finnish scholar of folk music, an ethnographer and ethnomusicologist.

Väisänen was born in Savonranta. In the early twentieth century he documented, in recordings and photographs, traditional Finnish and Finno-Ugric music and musicians. With a scholarship from the Finno-Ugrian Society Väisänen traveled to Russia in 1914 to collect Finno-Ugric folk melodies. He made field trips to Mordovia, Ingria, Veps, Russian Karelia. His activities also marked the a new stage in the history of collecting Seto folk songs in Southern Estonia. After the first trip in 1912 he made 6 fieldtrips to Estonia between 1912 and 1923.

A. O. Väisänen's dissertation was presented in 1939 on Ob-Ugrian folk music in German: Untersuchungen über die Ob-ugrischen Melodien: eine vergleichende Studien nebst methodischer Einleitung.

Between 1926 and 1957 Väisänen hold the position of the head of the folk music department at the Sibelius Academy, Helsinki, Finland. He was the professor of musicology at University of Helsinki from 1956 to 1959. He died in Helsinki, aged 79.
