= MS J. L. Runeberg =

Steamship

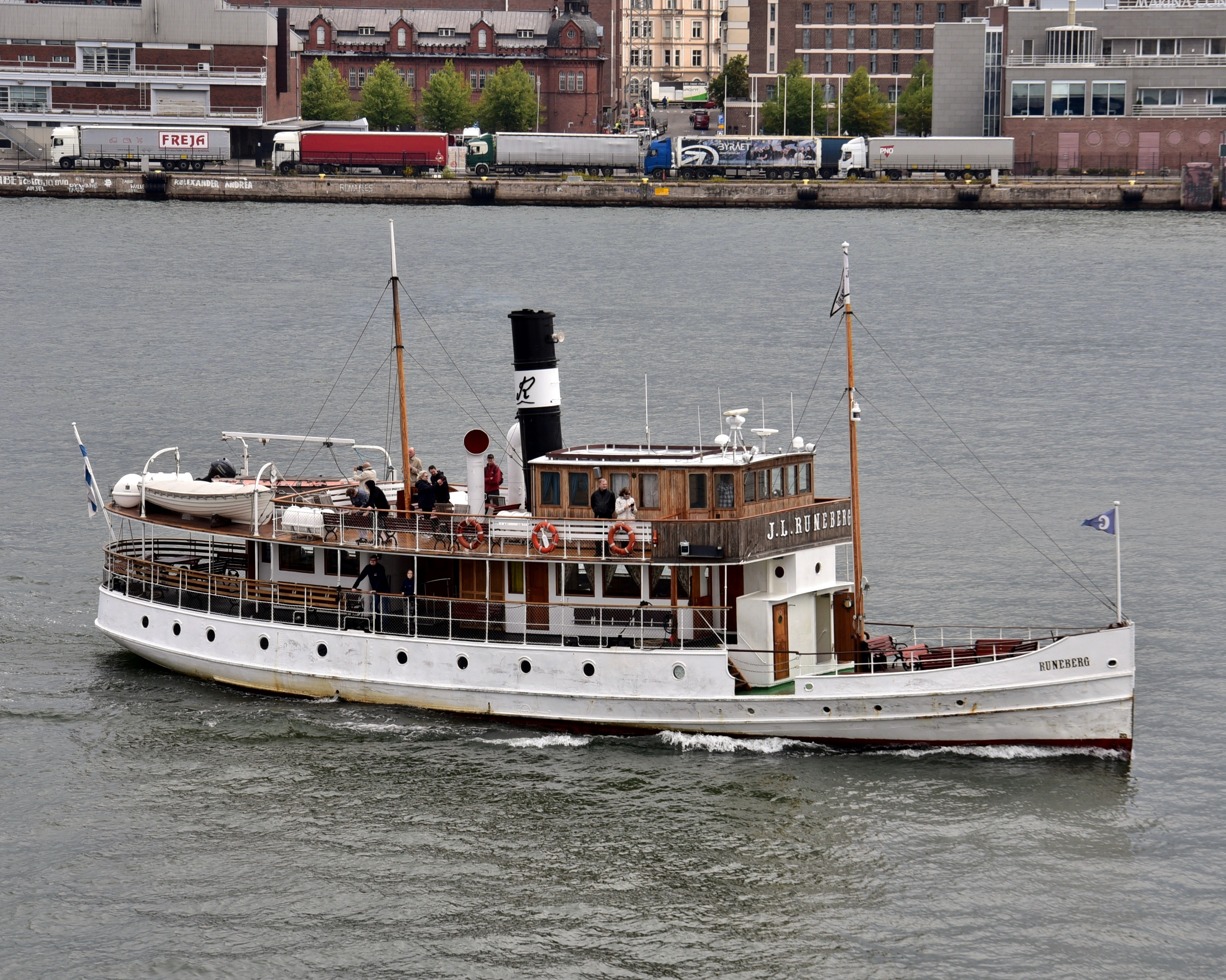
M/S J.L.Runeberg departing from Helsinki in August 2019.

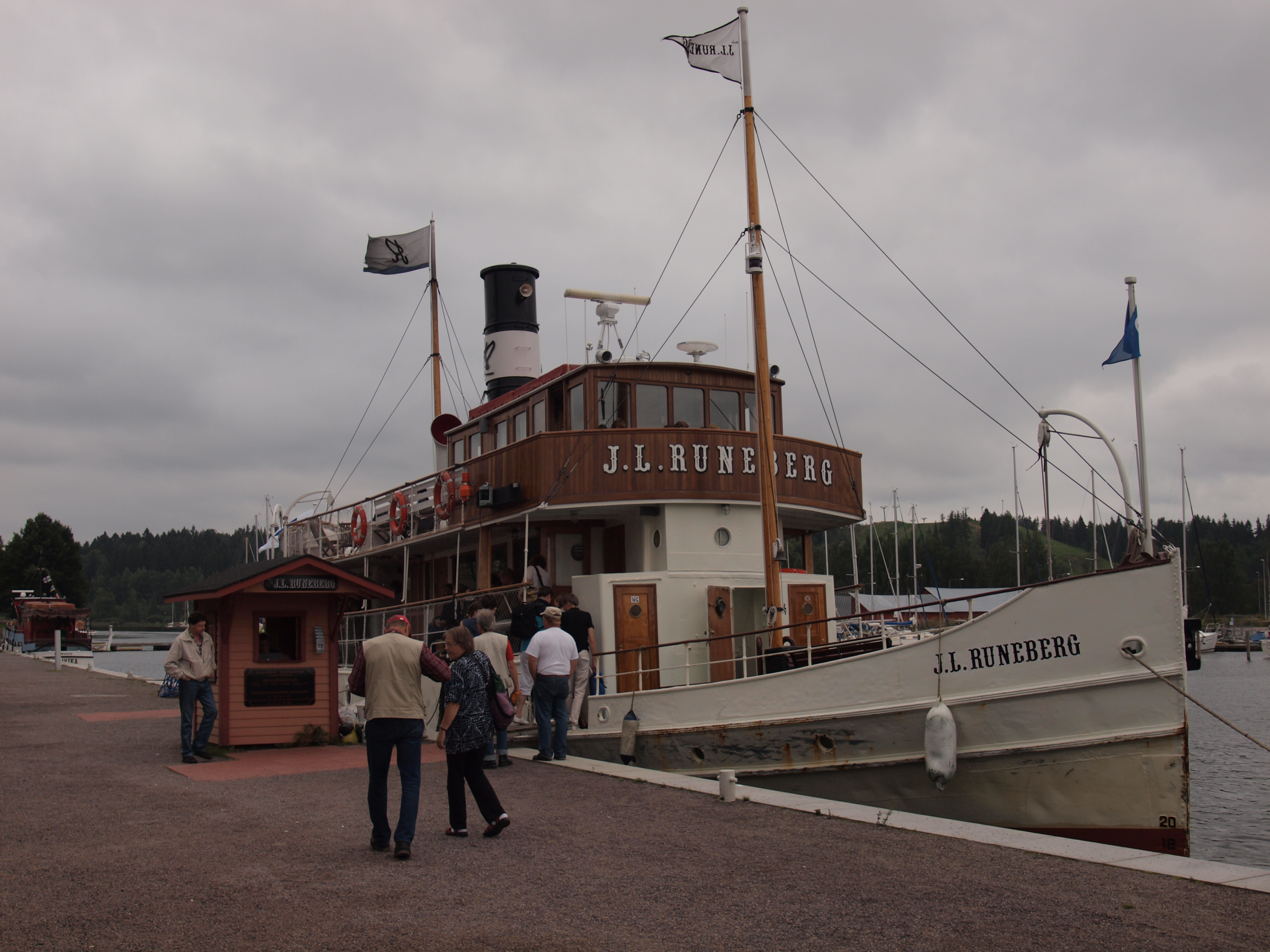
M/S J.L.Runeberg in the Porvoo harbour.

MS J. L. Runeberg (formerly SS Helsingfors Skärgård) is a steamship built at Sandvikens Skeppsdocka och Mekaniska Verkstad in Helsinki, Finland in 1912. It is named after Johan Ludvig Runeberg, the Finnish national poet.

The ship operates between Helsinki and Porvoo from May to September four to five days a week, and between Helsinki and Loviisa from July to August once per week.

== History ==
The ship operated a service to Korkeasaari from 1945 to 1949. The original steam engine was replaced with a diesel engine in 1962.

The Helsinki city bailiff seized the ship on 22 August 1965 because of unpaid debts. At the subsequent auction, it was bought by Leo Vuoristo, who had recently purchased Haikko Manor with his wife, Satu. The ship was sold to Ingmar Gustafsson and Ted Lönnroos in 1985 and was then renovated by volunteers. Its 75th anniversary was celebrated with a voyage to Stockholm.

== Statistics ==
- Passengers: 220
- Length: 28.8 m
- Width: 6.65 m
- Draft: 2.0 m
- ISM certified in 1998
