= Statue of Johan Ludvig Runeberg =

Coordinates: 60°10′03″N 24°56′51″E

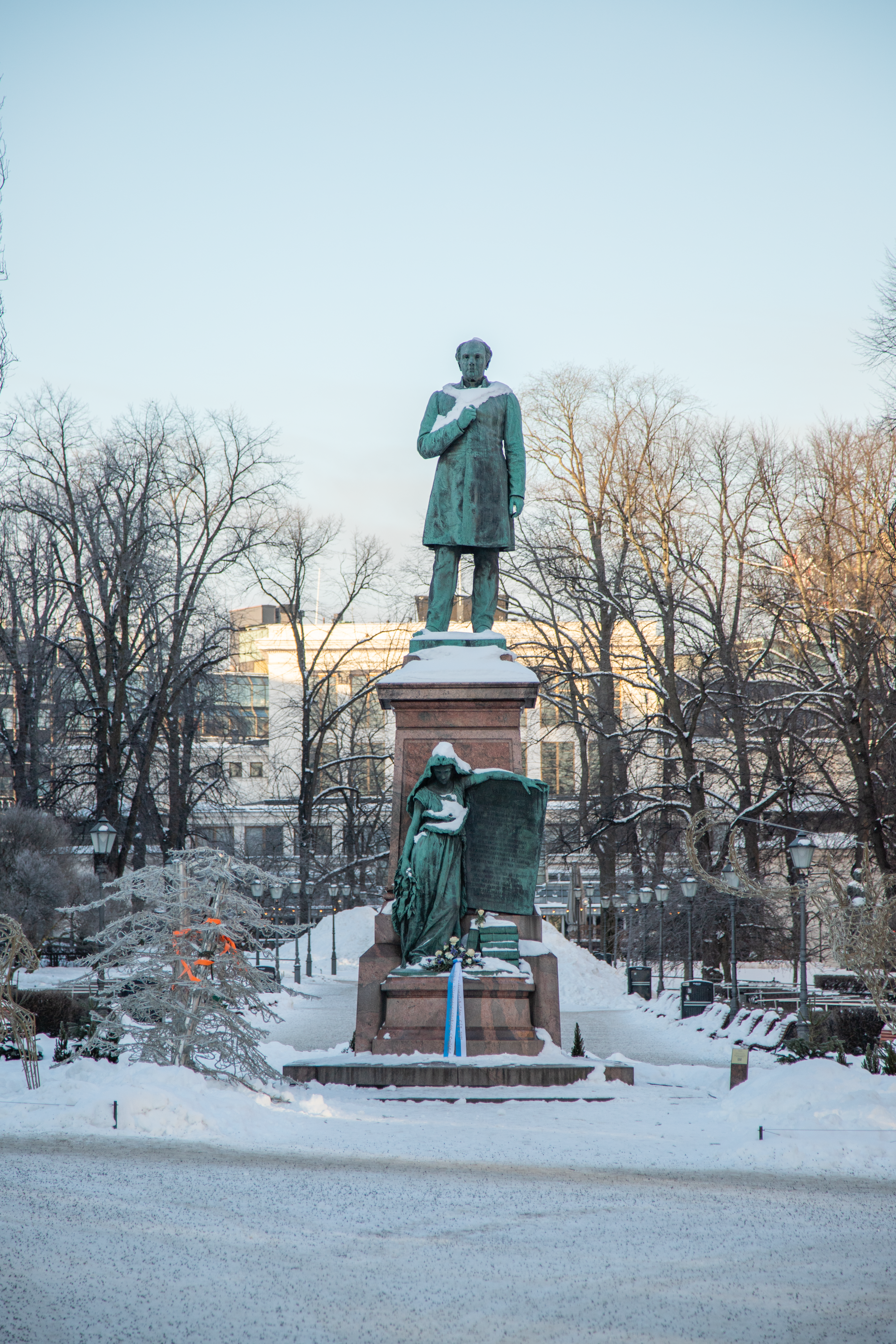
- Statue of J. L. Runeberg
- Interactive map of Statue of Johan Ludvig Runeberg
- Location: Esplanadi, Helsinki
- Designer: Walter Runeberg
- Inauguration date: 6 May 1885

The Statue of Johan Ludvig Runeberg is a statue dedicated to the Finland-Swedish author, national poet and priest Johan Ludvig Runeberg (1804–1877), designed and sculpted by his son Walter Runeberg (1838–1920). The statue is located in the Esplanadi park in Helsinki.

== Sculpture ==
The memorial stands on the central path of the middle section of Esplanadi park — known as Runeberg's esplanade — between Kluuvikatu and Kasarmikatu. The bronze figure stands on a red granite pedestal, facing east towards the Market Square.

Runeberg is depicted at around the age of 55 — the age at which the second part of his major work Tales of Ensign Stål was published — dressed in a priest's coat of the kind he wore while teaching at Borgå gymnasium. He stands upright with his right hand resting on his chest, thumb tucked under the lapel, as if about to begin a speech.

By the foot of the pedestal there is a young woman wrapped in bearskin, popularly known as Suomi ("Finland") or Vårt land ("Our Land"). She holds a laurel wreath in her right hand and, in her left, a large inscription tablet bearing three verses of the Finnish national anthem in Runeberg's native language Swedish. A pile of books lies at her feet. The figure was intended as Finland's allegorical muse or mythological guardian spirit, rather than a national personification.

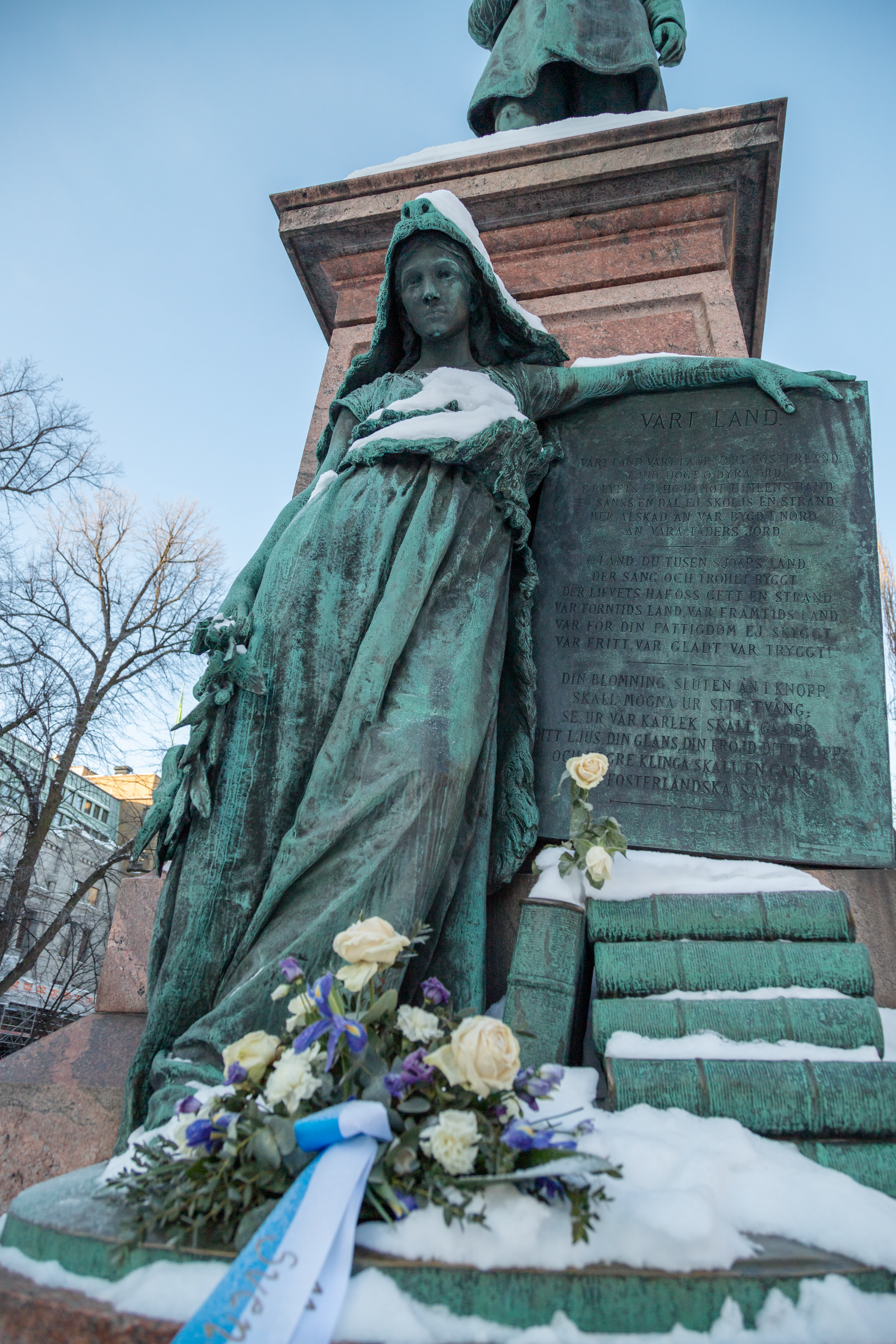
The words from three verses of the Finnish national anthem, in Runeberg's native language Swedish.

Swedish original

Vårt land, vårt land, vårt fosterland,
Ljud högt, o dyra ord!
Ej lyfts en höjd mot himlens rand,
Ej sänks en dal, ej sköljs en strand,
Mer älskad än vår bygd i nord,
Än våra fäders jord.

O land, du tusen sjöars land,
Där sång och trohet byggt,
Där livets hav oss gett en strand,
Vår forntids land, vår framtids land.
Var för din fattigdom ej skyggt.
Var fritt, var glatt, var tryggt.

Din blomning, sluten än i knopp,
Skall mogna ur sitt tvång;
Se, ur vår kärlek skall gå opp
Ditt ljus, din glans, din fröjd, ditt hopp.
Och högre klinga skall en gång
Vår fosterländska sång.

English translation

Our land, our land, our Fatherland!
Ring out, dear word, oh sound!
No rising hill, or mountain grand,
No sloping dale, no northern strand,
There is, more loved, to be found,
Than this — our fathers’ ground.

Oh land, the thousand lakes’ own land,
Of faith, and lay, and glee,
Where life’s main sea gave us a strand,
Our fore-time’s land, our future’s land,
Shy of thy poorness, never be,
Be calm, be glad, be free!

Thy blossom, hidden now from sight,
Shall burst its bud ere long.
Lo! from our love, shall rise aright,
Thy sun, thy hope, thy joy, thy light,
And higher, once, more full and strong,
Shall ring Our Country’s song.
(Trans. from Swedish by Anna Krook, 1904)

The memorial bears no inscription naming the person depicted, as this was considered self-evident at the time. While no inscription names Runeberg directly, the granite pedestal is inscribed on the south side in Finnish — Suomen kansa maamme laulajalle ("From the people of Finland to the singer of Our Land") — and on the north side in Swedish: Af Finlands folk ("From the people of Finland"). The rear face bears the year 1885. The combined height of the statue and pedestal is eight metres.

== History ==
A statue of Runeberg had been proposed during the poet's own lifetime. After his death in May 1877, the Finnish Diet launched a public fundraising campaign on 31 May 1877 and established a committee in early 1878. The committee was chaired by Senator Lars Theodor von Hellens, with the author Zacharias Topelius as secretary and merchant councillor Henrik Borgström as treasurer; further members included J. V. Snellman, Lorenz Lindelöf, Otto Donner, Robert Lagerborg and F. W. G. Hjelt.

The commission was awarded without competition to Walter Runeberg, who was living in Paris at the time. His draft was completed in 1881 and approved in 1882 while on display in Finland. The pose of the figure was inspired by an ancient sculpture of Sophocles in the collection of the Lateran Museum in Rome. The position of the hand was modelled by the painter Hjalmar Munsterhjelm. The statue was cast twice in bronze in Paris. The female pedestal figure was completed separately in 1883.

=== Unveiling ===
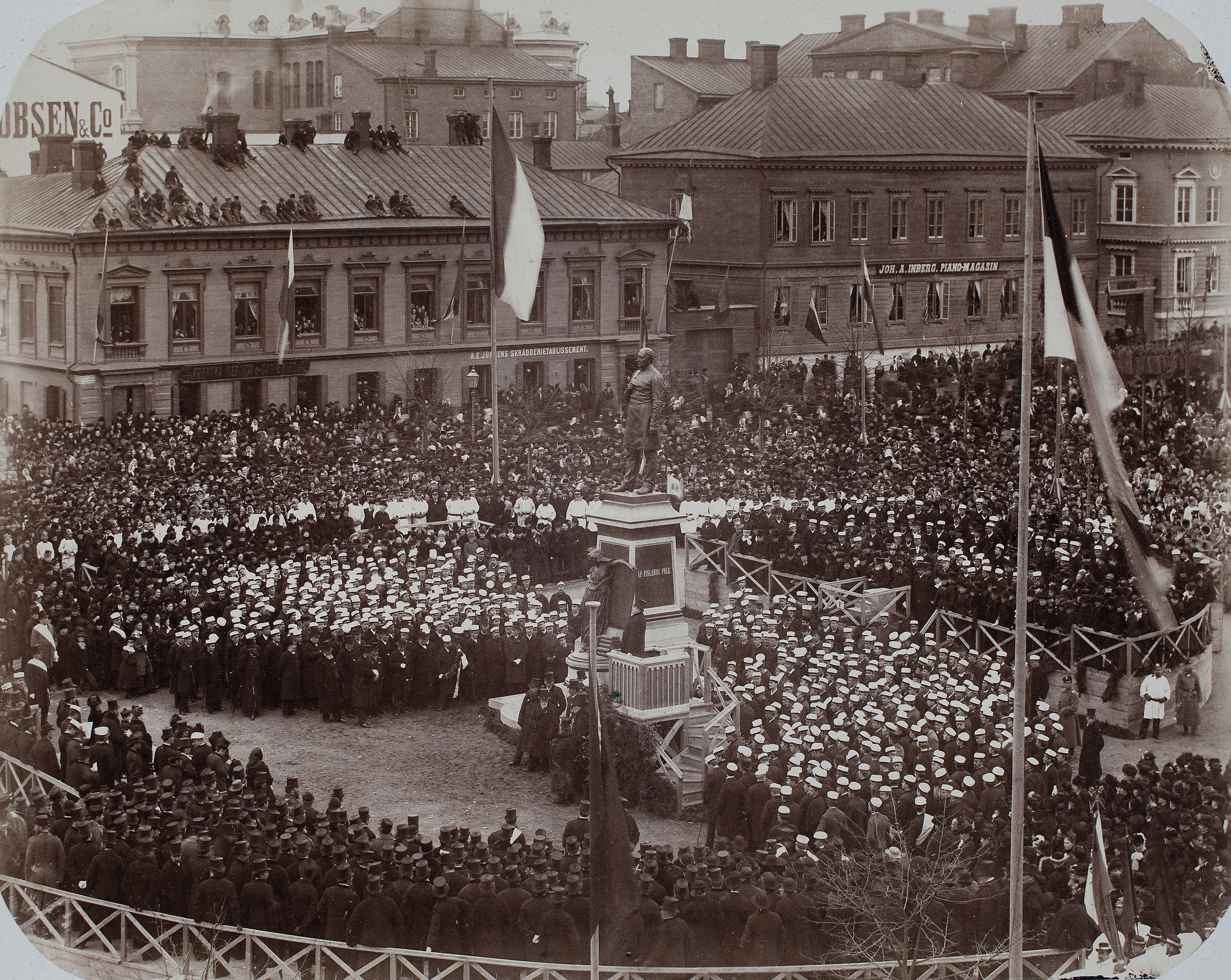
The unveiling ceremony on 6 May 1885.

The statue was unveiled on 6 May 1885, the eighth anniversary of the poet's death, in front of a crowd of approximately 20,000 people. The event was a major public celebration: flags flew across the entire city and shops were closed for the day. The ceremony opened with a 130-piece brass band playing Björneborgarnas marsch, followed by a cantata performed by a choir of several hundred singers. Speeches were given by State Councillor Wilhelm Lagus in Swedish and by Dr Julius Krohn in Finnish. The national anthem Maamme was then sung, conducted by its composer Professor Fredrik Pacius. In the evening the city was festively illuminated.

A second statue of Runeberg was unveiled on 30 May 1885 in Porvoo, the city where he spent most of his life. This version was cast in bronze at natural size but without the female pedestal figure.

== Reception and legacy ==
The Runeberg memorial was regarded as Helsinki's first public commemorative statue, though strictly speaking several older monuments exist, such as the Empress's Stone and certain funerary monuments. Walter Runeberg produced several miniature copies of the work in various materials, which passed to different private owners. In 1895 he donated the original plaster model of the female figure to Borgå gymnasium, where it was placed in the school's upper hall.
