= Johan Ludvig Runeberg =

Finnish poet (1804–1877)

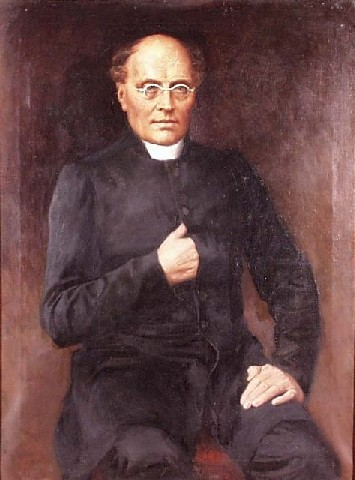
- Portrait by Albert Edelfelt (1893)
- Born: 5 February 1804; Jakobstad, Sweden
- Died: 6 May 1877 (aged 73); Porvoo, Grand Duchy of Finland, Russian Empire
- Education: Imperial Academy of Turku
- Occupations: Priest and poet
- Spouse: Fredrika Tengström
- Children: 8, including Walter

Signature
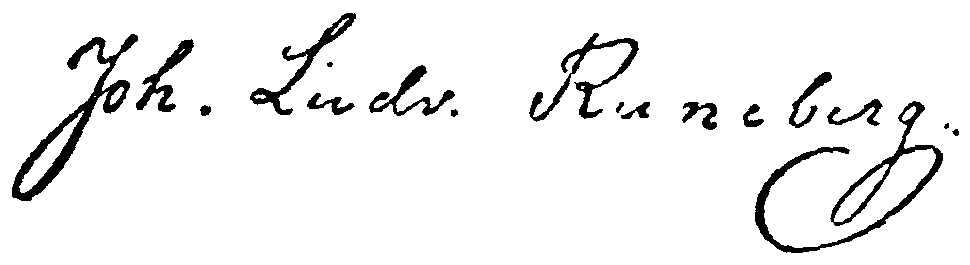

Johan Ludvig Runeberg (Finland Swedish: [ˈjuːhɑn ˈlʉdːviɡ ˈrʉːnebærj]; 5 February 1804 – 6 May 1877) was a Finnish priest, lyric and epic poet. He wrote exclusively in Swedish. He is considered a national poet of Finland. He is the author of the lyrics to Vårt land (Our Land, Maamme in Finnish). Runeberg was also involved in the modernization of the Finnish Lutheran hymnal and produced many texts for the new edition.

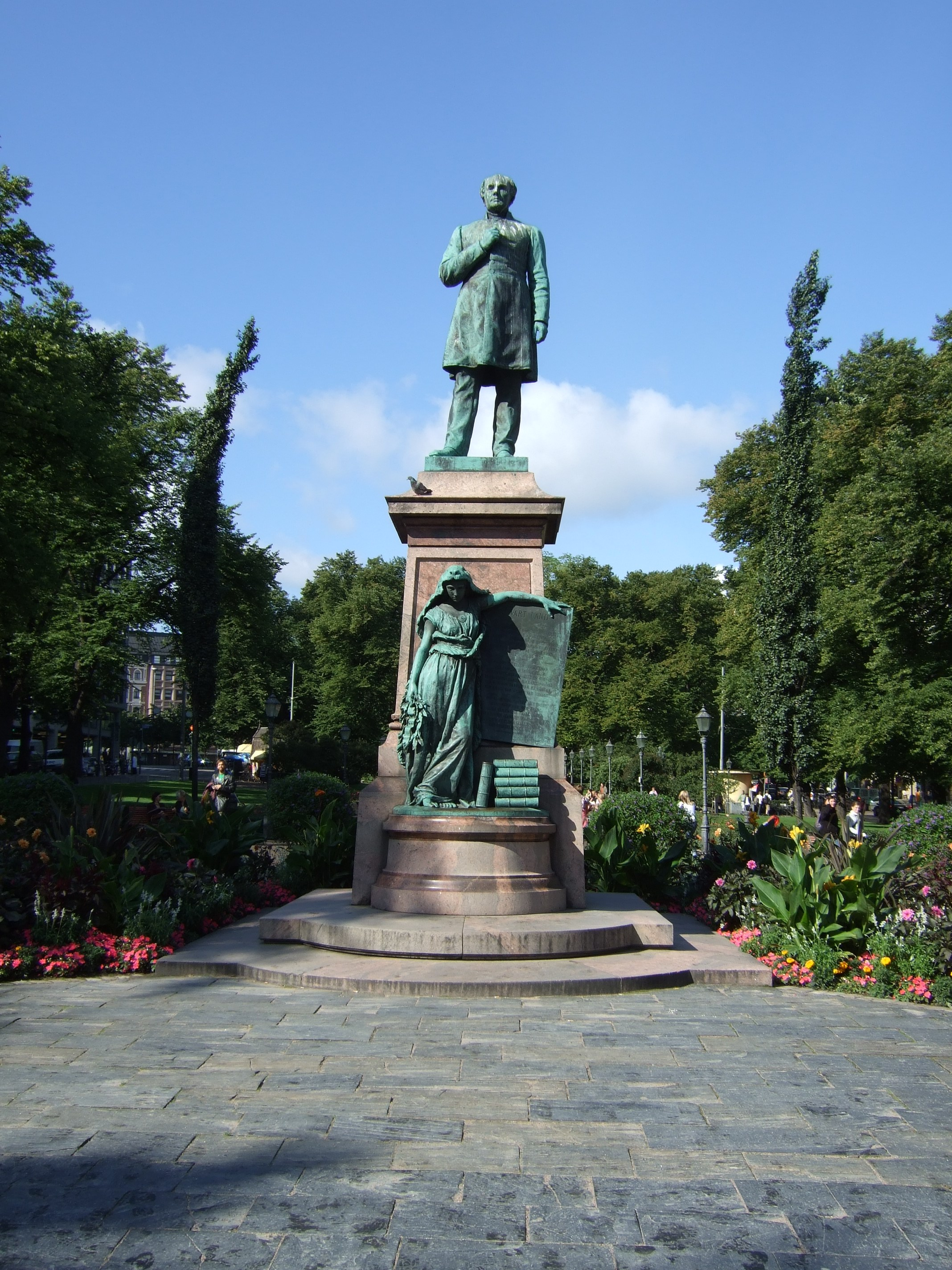
Statue of Johan Ludvig Runeberg on Esplanadi in Helsinki, Finland

== Background ==
=== Childhood ===
Runeberg was born into a Swedish-speaking family in Jakobstad, on the shores of the Gulf of Bothnia. His parents were sea captain Lorentz Ulrik Runeberg (1772–1828) and Anna Maria Malm (1782–1834). His paternal grandfather Ludvig had moved within Sweden from the west to the east, which is now Finland, and Anna Maria Malm was born to a merchant family from Jakobstad, which probably also had their roots in Sweden.

As a child, Runeberg suffered from scrofula, which led to glandular swelling. His physical development slowed down due to illness so that he did not learn to walk until he was three or four years old. From his father, Johan inherited a manly and brisk character, and from his mother, he inherited sensitivity and artistic talent.

=== Education ===
At the age of eight, Runeberg was sent to live with his uncle and attend school in Oulu. Runeberg studied in the city of Vaasa and later on at the Imperial Academy of Turku, where he befriended Johan Vilhelm Snellman and Zacharias Topelius. His studies concentrated mainly on the classical languages of Latin and Greek. He earned a Master of Philosophy during 1827. He served as a tutor (1822–1826), docent at the Imperial Alexander University (1830) and teacher at the Swedish-language Helsingfors Lyceum (1831–1836).

From 1837, he lived in Porvoo, where he served as professor of Latin literature in the Borgå gymnasium. Runeberg was the tutor of Carl Henrik Alopaeus, who would later become the bishop of Porvoo and an educator of the deaf. Runeberg also supported Carl Oscar Malm's school for the deaf in Porvoo (at which Alopaeus taught) as well as serving on the school board. Finnish salon hostess Natalia Castrén (1830–1881) was a member of Runeberg's cultural circle.

== Poetry ==
Many of his poems deal with life in rural Finland. The best known of these is Bonden Paavo, (Farmer Paavo, Saarijärven Paavo in Finnish), about a smallholding peasant farmer in the poor parish of Saarijärvi and his determination, sisu (guts) and unwavering faith in providence in the face of a harsh climate and years of bad harvests. Three times, a frosty night destroys his crops. Every time, he mixes double the amount of bark into his bark bread to stave off starvation and works ever harder to dry off marsh into dryer land that would not be as exposed to the night frost. After the fourth year, Paavo finally gets a rich crop. As his wife exults, thanks God and tells Paavo to enjoy full bread made entirely out of grain, Paavo instructs his wife to mix bark into grain once more, because their neighbour's crop has been lost in a frost and he gives half of his crop to the needy neighbour.

== Selected works ==
Runeberg's main works included the idealist poem "Älgskyttarna" (Elk Hunters, 1832) and the epic Kung Fjalar (King Fjalar, 1844). The heroic poem Fänrik Ståls Sägner (The Tales of Ensign Stål), Vänrikki Stoolin tarinat in Finnish) written between 1848 and 1860, is among the greatest Finnish epic poems outside the native Kalevala tradition, and contains tales of the Finnish War of 1808–09 with Russia. During the war, Sweden ignominiously lost Finland to Russia, and by the order of Alexander I, the Grand Duchy of Finland was established.

== Personal life ==
He was married to his second cousin Fredrika Runeberg, née Tengström, who wrote poems and novels. They were the parents of eight children, including the sculptor Walter Runeberg, who was their eldest son. He also had several emotional affairs throughout his life, most notably with Maria Prytz and the younger poet Emilie Björkstén.

Johan Ludvig Runeberg met poet Fredrika Wenman at a school in Vaasa. Runeberg dedicated his poem to Frigga. However, the courtship ended when Runeberg left to study at the Royal Academy of Turku in 1823.

== Legacy ==
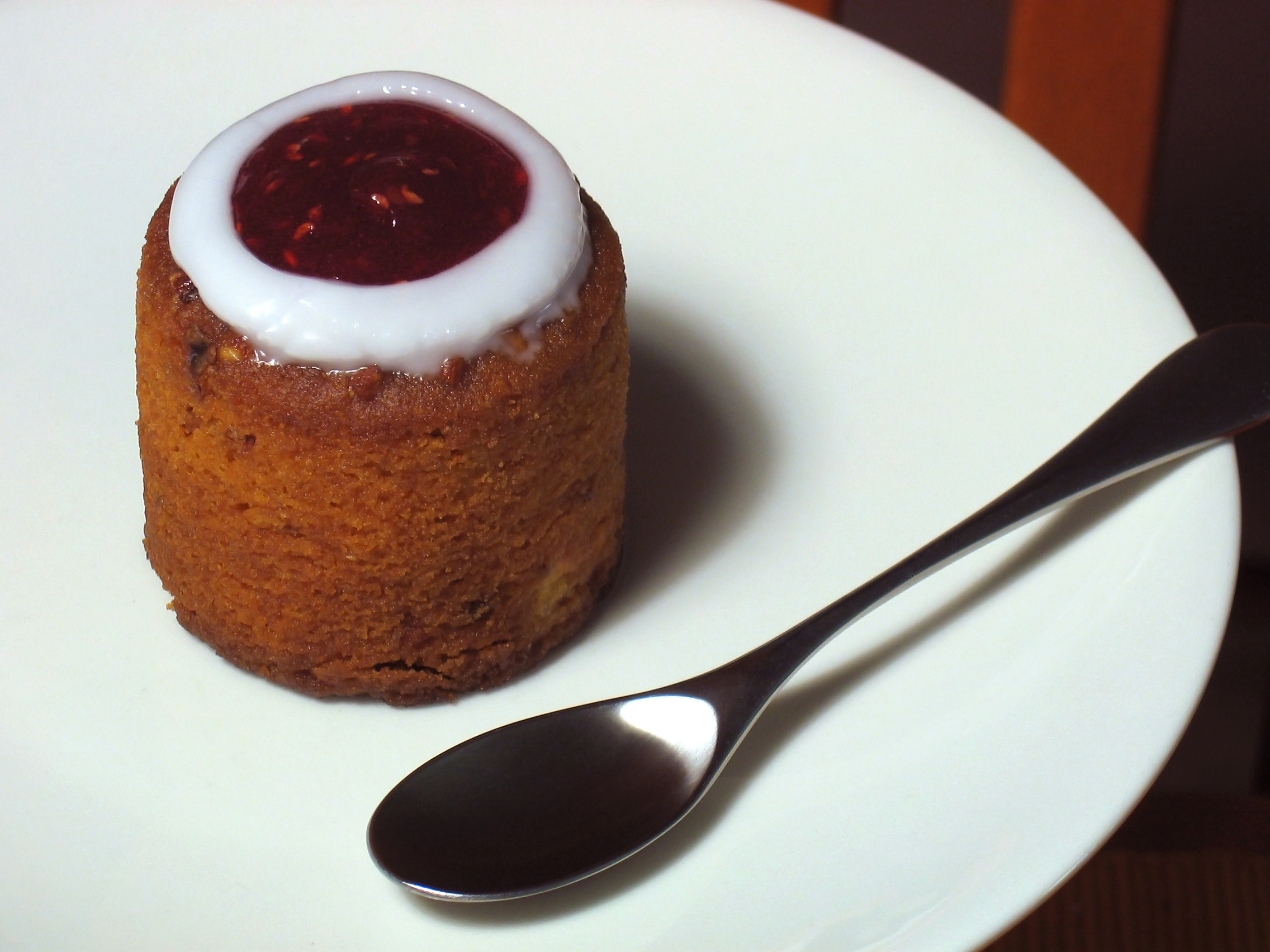
Runeberg torte

Runeberg Day (Finnish: Runebergin päivä; Swedish: Runebergsdagen) is celebrated annually on 5 February, the day of Runeberg's birth. A pastry flavored with almonds called Runeberg's torte (Finnish: Runebergintorttu; Swedish: Runebergstårta) is generally available in stores from the beginning of January until 5 February.

There is a statue of Johan Ludwig Runeberg by his son Walter Runeberg on Esplanadi in the heart of Helsinki. Runeberg Township in Becker County, Minnesota was also named after Runeberg.

The Runeberginkatu street in central Helsinki is named after him.

Runeberg was selected as the main motif of the Finnish commemorative coin, the €10 Johan Ludvig Runeberg and Finnish Poetry commemorative coin. It was minted in 2004 celebrating the 200th anniversary of his birth. The obverse of the coin features a stylized portrait of Runeberg's face. The reverse features an 1831 font sample from the Swedish-language newspaper Helsingfors Tidningar, since Runeberg wrote most of his work in Swedish.

== See also ==
- List of Swedish-language writers
- MS J. L. Runeberg
- Project Runeberg
- Runeberg Prize
- Runeberg torte
- Sven Dufva
