= Fredrika Runeberg =

Finnish novelist (1807–1879)

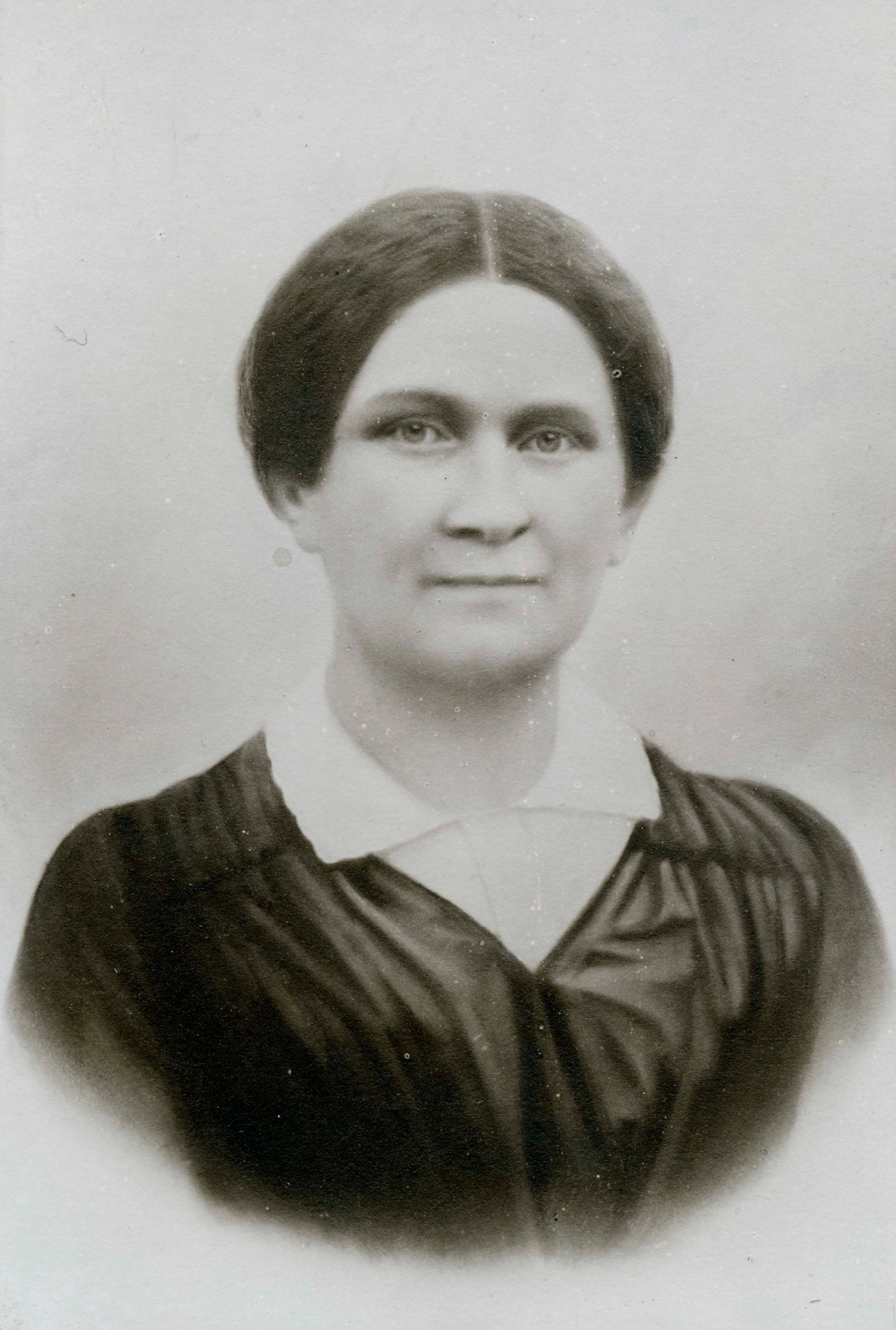
- Runeberg in 1846
- Born: Fredrika Charlotta Tengström; 2 September 1807; Jakobstad, Kingdom of Sweden
- Died: 27 May 1879 (aged 71); Helsinki, Grand Duchy of Finland, Russian Empire
- Occupations: Novelist; short story writer; journalist
- Spouse: Johan Ludvig Runeberg
- Children: 8, including Walter
- Relatives: Jakob Tengström (granduncle)
- Writing career
- Genres: Historical fiction, journalism

Fredrika Charlotta Runeberg (née Tengström; 2 September 1807 – 27 May 1879) was a Finnish (Finland-Swedish) novelist and journalist. She was a pioneer of Finnish historical fiction and one of the first woman journalists in Finland.

In her own time, she was mainly known as the wife of her famous husband, poet Johan Ludvig Runeberg. The family lived most of their life in Porvoo, where she created most of her works, including the historical novel Fru Catharina Boije och hennes döttrar (1858). She wrote in Swedish.

== Life and career ==
Born in a bourgeoise family in Jakobstad, Fredrika Tengström lived most of her youth in Turku, the then capital of Finland. She was educated in Anna Salmberg's school for girls in 1824–25. She met her future husband, Johan Ludvig Runeberg, her second cousin, while living with her great-uncle Jakob Tengström, Archbishop of Turku, in Pargas, having lost her home in the Great Fire of Turku in 1827. In 1828, she moved to Helsinki, the new capital, with her mother, and married Runeberg in January 1831. The family settled in Porvoo and had seven sons; the only daughter died an infant.

Fredrika Runeberg was the first Finnish author to critically analyze the status of women, at home and in the society. Her oeuvre includes two historical novels: Fru Catharina Boije och hennes döttrar (1858), set in Finland during the Great Northern War, and Sigrid Liljeholm (1862), set in the Cudgel War. She also contributed to various newspapers and magazines, and translated foreign literature and articles, mostly from French, German, and English, into Swedish.

She was a close friend of Anette Reuterskiöld.

== Legacy ==
=== Runeberg torte ===
According to a legend, Fredrika Runeberg is the creator of the famous Finnish pastry, the Runeberg torte, although her recipe is also said to be based upon an earlier recipe by confectioner Lars Astenius from Porvoo. The torte is typically served on Johan Ludvig Runeberg's birthday, on 5 February, which is an established flag flying day in Finland. The torte tradition has spread all over Finland, commemorating the country's national poet.

=== Home museum ===
Shortly after her death in Helsinki, the Runeberg family home in Porvoo was made into a museum in 1882, being one of the most popular sights in town.

=== Fredrika Runeberg Stipendium ===
Since 1987, the Swedish Cultural Foundation in Finland has awarded the annual Fredrika Runeberg Stipendium in her memory to a "mother of community", i.e. women with political or societal achievements. The laureates include prominent people like Elisabeth Rehn (1996), Märta Tikkanen (2001), Eva Biaudet (2006), and Astrid Thors (2011).

== Bibliography ==
- Fru Catharina Boije och hennes döttrar. En berättelse från stora ofredens tid. Finska Litteratursällskapet, Helsinki 1858.
- Teckningar och drömmar. Theodor Sederholm, Helsinki 1861.
- Sigrid Liljeholm. Theodor Sederholm, Helsinki 1862.
- Anteckningar om Runeberg. Min pennas saga (= Svenska Litteratursällskapet i Finland. Skrifter 310, ISSN 0039-6842). Mercator, Helsinki 1946 (posthumous).
- Receptbok (= Svenska Litteratursällskapet i Finland. Skrifter 652). Svenska Litteratursällskapet i Finland, Helsinki 2003, ISBN 951-583-093-1 (posthumous).
