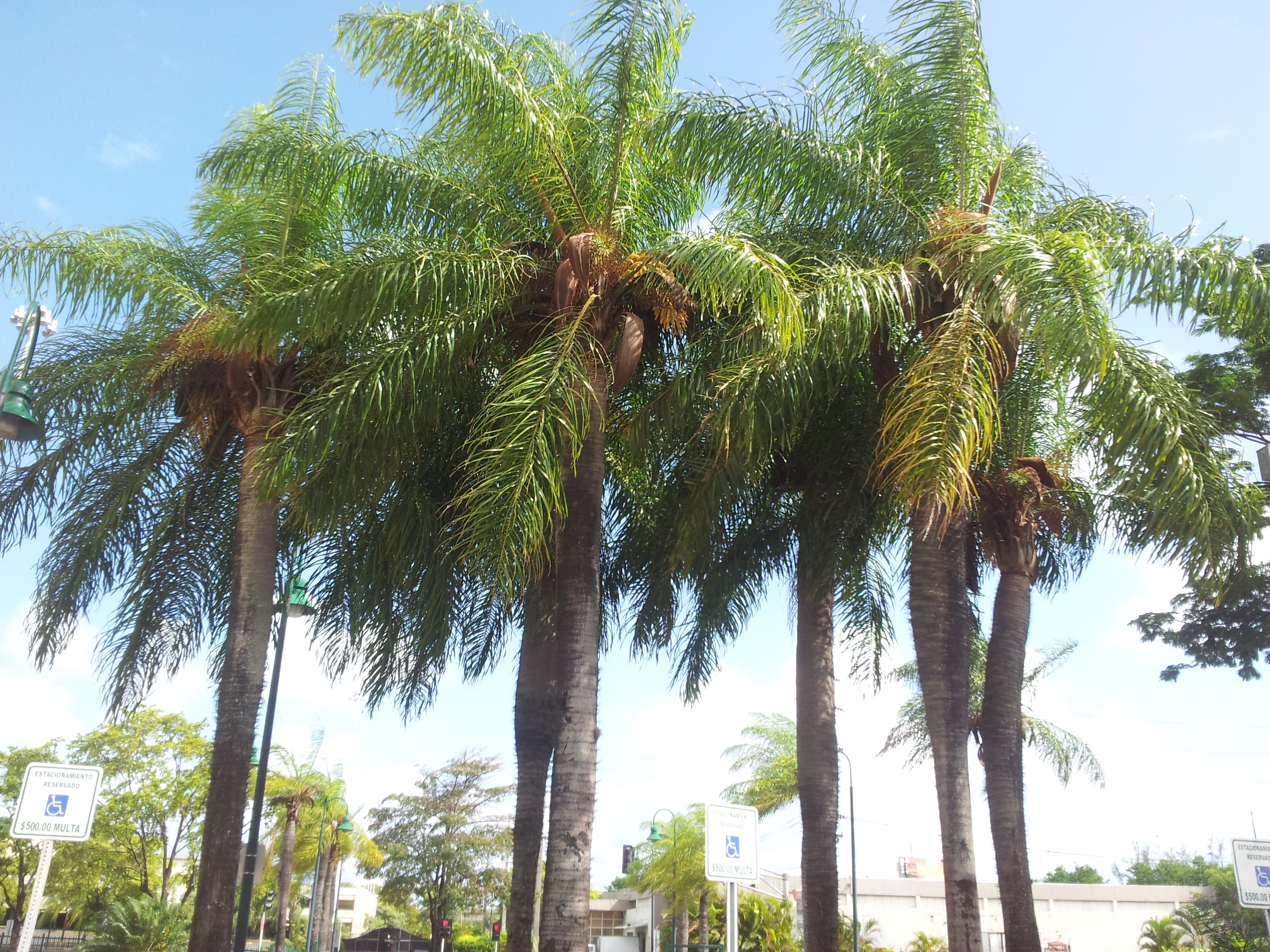

Scientific classification
- Kingdom: Plantae
- Clade: Tracheophytes
- Clade: Angiosperms
- Clade: Monocots
- Clade: Commelinids
- Order: Arecales
- Family: Arecaceae
- Genus: Acrocomia
- Species: A. media

Binomial name
- Acrocomia media O.F.Cook

= Acrocomia media =

Species of palm

Acrocomia media is a species of palm which is native to Puerto Rico and the Virgin Islands.

== Description ==
Acrocomia media is a pinnately leaved palm with a solitary, stout stem. It usually reaches a height of 8 to 10 metres (26 to 33 ft), sometimes growing up to 15 metres (49 ft) tall, with a stem diameter of 20 to 30 centimetres (7.9 to 11.8 in).

== Taxonomy ==
American botanist George Proctor considered A. media to be a valid species on the basis of its shorter, more slender trunk, but other authors considered it a synonym of A. aculeata.

=== Common names ===
Acrocomia media is commonly known as coroso or palma de coroso in Puerto Rico.
