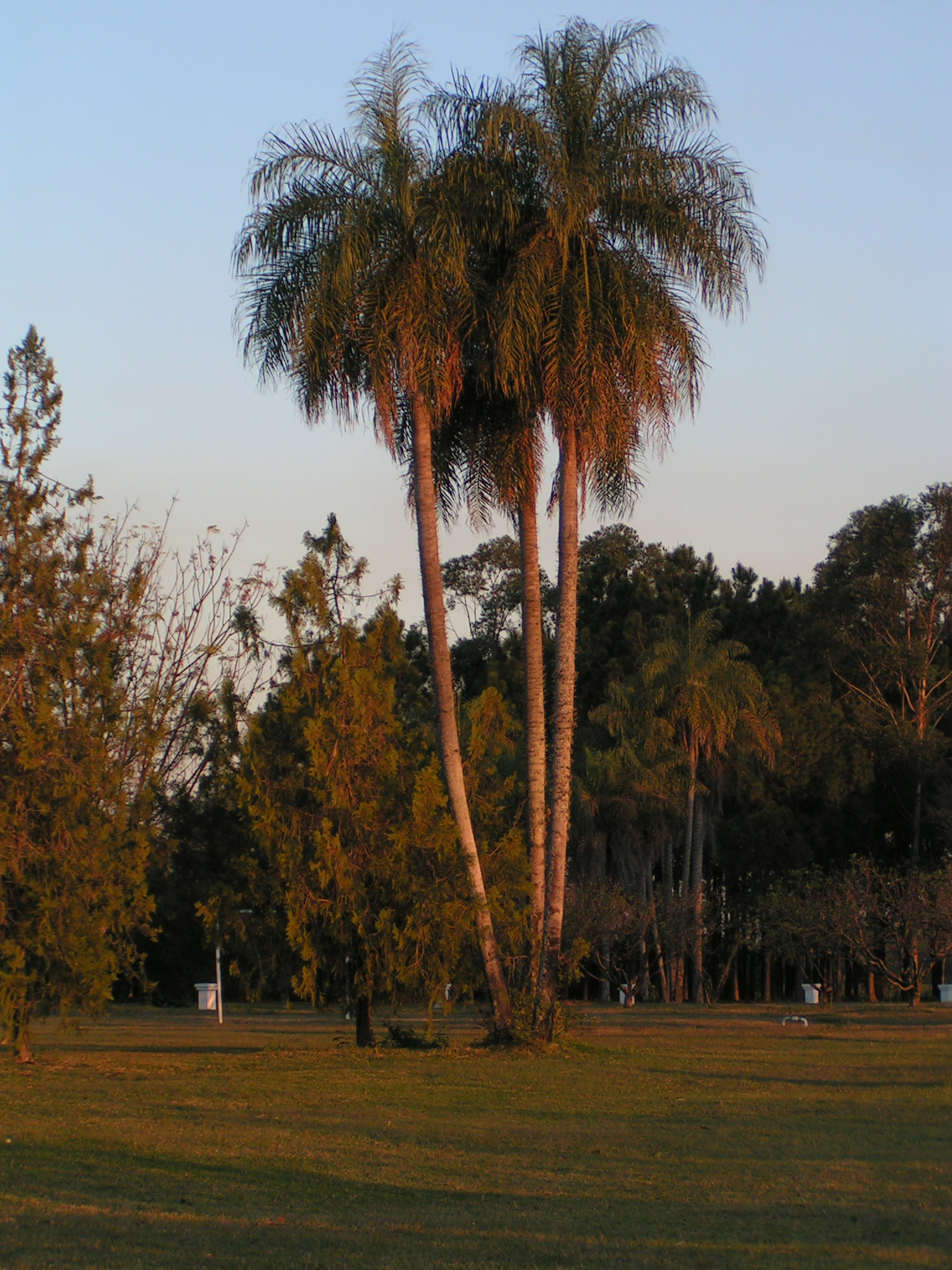

Conservation status
- Least Concern (IUCN 3.1)

Scientific classification
- Kingdom: Plantae
- Clade: Tracheophytes
- Clade: Angiosperms
- Clade: Monocots
- Clade: Commelinids
- Order: Arecales
- Family: Arecaceae
- Genus: Acrocomia
- Species: A. totai

Binomial name
- Acrocomia totai Mart.

= Acrocomia totai =

Species of palm

Acrocomia totai, also known as Paraguay palm or mbocaya (from Guarani: "mboka" meaning "to break" and "ya" meaning "fruit"), is a species of palm in the family Arecaceae and the genus Acrocomia. It is native to parts of South America, where it occurs predominantly in Paraguay and the bordering subdivisions of Brazil, Bolivia and Argentina.

== Identification ==
Acrocomia totai can be difficult to distinguish from Acrocomia aculeata. Its trunk is often smoother and less irregular, while its crown tends to be denser and more compact. In contrast, A. aculeata generally has a more open and irregular crown.
