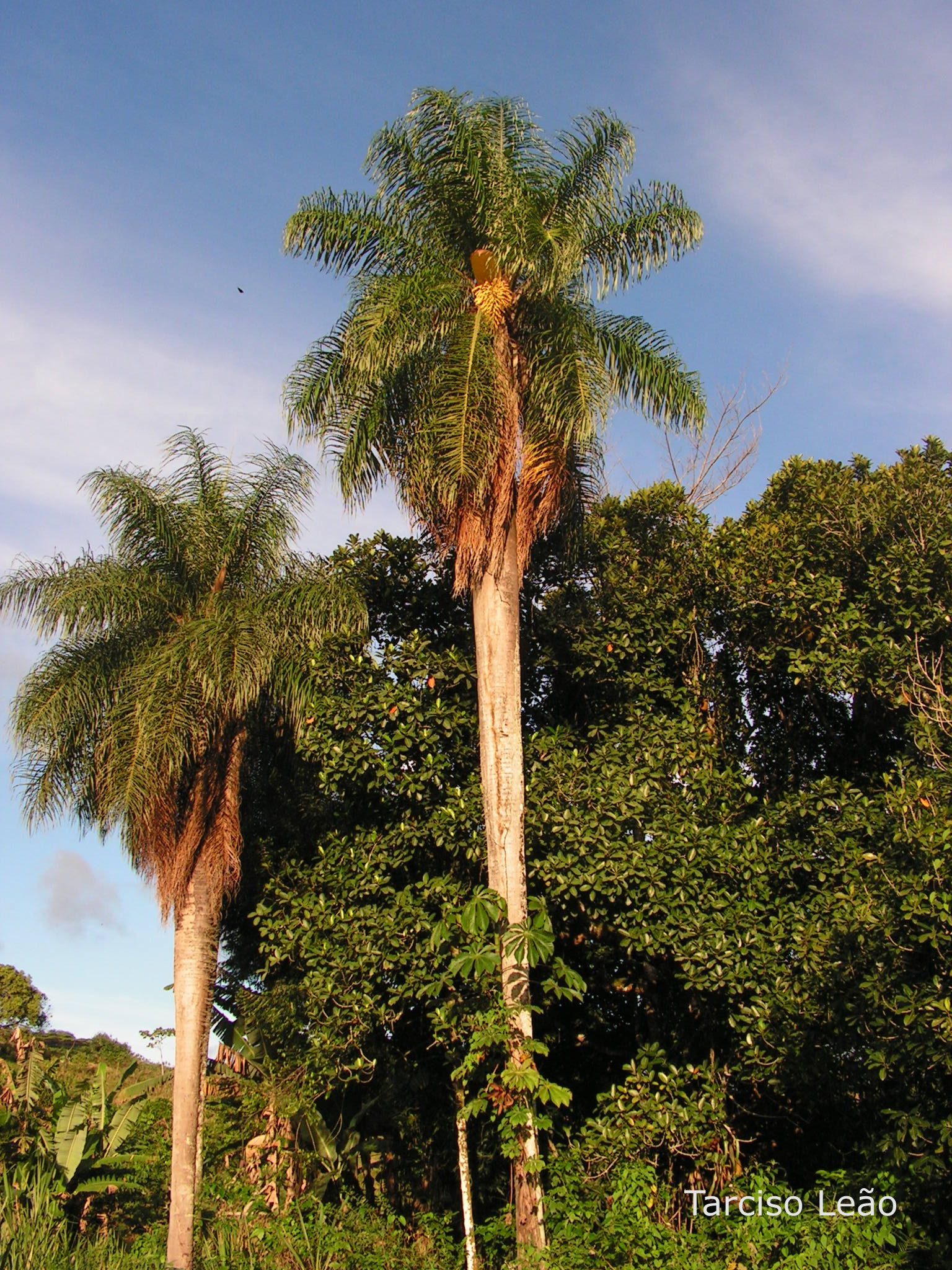

Scientific classification
- Kingdom: Plantae
- Clade: Embryophytes
- Clade: Tracheophytes
- Clade: Angiosperms
- Clade: Monocots
- Clade: Commelinids
- Order: Arecales
- Family: Arecaceae
- Genus: Acrocomia
- Species: A. intumescens

Binomial name
- Acrocomia intumescens (Drude, 1881)

= Acrocomia intumescens =

Species of plant

Acrocomia intumescens, the macaúba-barriguda tree, is a palm tree in the genus Acrocomia. It is native to the Brazilian states of Alagoas, Pernambuco, Rio Grande do Norte, Paraíba and Ceará. It occurs in the Atlantic Forest, both in the Zona da Mata and in the Caatinga moist-forest enclaves.

This palm is one of two species that are locally known by the name of macaúba, macaíba, boicaiuva or coco-de-catarro, the other being Acrocomia aculeata. The local names are derived from the Tupi word ma'kaí'ba, meaning "yellow-coconut".

== Characteristics ==
The plant has a solitary stem that grows up to ten meters high and is swollen in the middle, as described by the Latin specific epithet intumescens. The palm leaves are compound, plicated and deciduous, and the inflorescence is panicle-like.

== Uses ==
The plant is widely used in urban afforestation of squares and roads in Northeast Brazil, and its wood is widely used in civil constructions. The fruits have an edible mesocarp.

== Cultivation ==
A panicle contains an average of 25 fruits. Seedling germination is slow, and can last from one to three years.

=== Densification ===
Studies carried out by the Federal University of Viçosa point to a density of 400 plants per hectare. This is limited by the size of macaúba leaves, which, when planted, should not compete with neighboring plants for sunlight.

Generally, when palm stand density increases, productivity is greatly reduced, as the competition for nutrients is high and their replacement rate is slow.

=== Climate ===
Unlike oil palm, whose agricultural productivity depends on well-defined soil and climate conditions, in which temperature and rainfall are not subject to disproportionate variations, macaúba grows in regions with altitudes between 500 and 1000 m, with rainfall below 1500 mm, and temperature ranging from 15 to 35°C.

=== Production cycle ===
Macaúba starts fruit production between 4 and 5 years after planting and its productivity extends beyond 50 years.

In commercial plantation projects, a useful life between 20 and 25 years is estimated. This is partially due to the size reached by the palm tree, which makes harvesting difficult.

The macaúba harvest period may change due to climate variation in each region, especially during the rainy season. In most of the Minas Gerais region, the period begins in October and extends until March. However, the peak of the harvest occurs in the months of mid-November to mid-January.

=== Productivity ===
It is difficult to estimate the annual production of native macaúba fruit due to a series of factors, mainly the variation in fruit yield per palm. In fact, the age of the plant, the soil and climate conditions, and the occurrence of annual fires can influence the harvest.

As observed in some arable areas, or with more fertile soils, macaúba can produce up to 8 bunches per plant, with the number of fruits per panicle varying from 400 to 500. These rates are much higher than those observed in lands with less agricultural use, or in older or younger palm trees, whose average production is usually no more than 4 bunches per tree.

In general, the same palm tree exhibits decreasing production in each 3-year cycle, that is, good production in the 1st year, regular in the 2nd year, lower production in the 3rd year, and returning to good yields in the subsequent year.

Therefore, production per macaúba is very varied, depending on soil and climate conditions, reaching a productivity between 25,000 and 40,000 kg of fruit per hectare per year, in a cultivation of 400 palm trees per hectare (62.5 to 100 kg of coconut per macaúba/year).

The challenge for new plantations is to define the best relationship of multiple variables in macaúba cultivation for greater return on investment, that is, the relationship between production, density, intercropping, cultural treatment and irrigation.

== Gallery ==
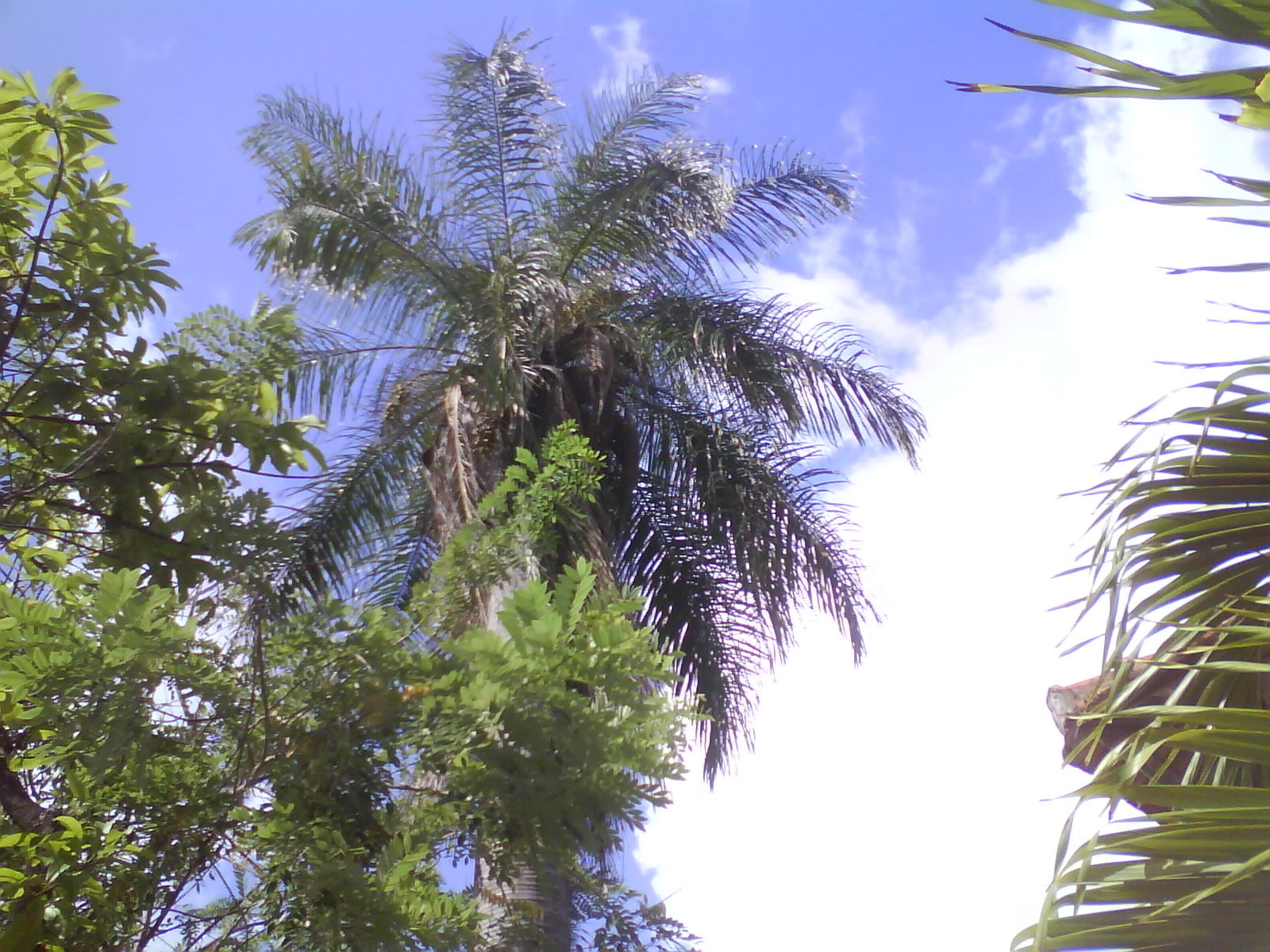
Example of a macaúba tree kept by the Agronomy department of the Federal University of Ceará

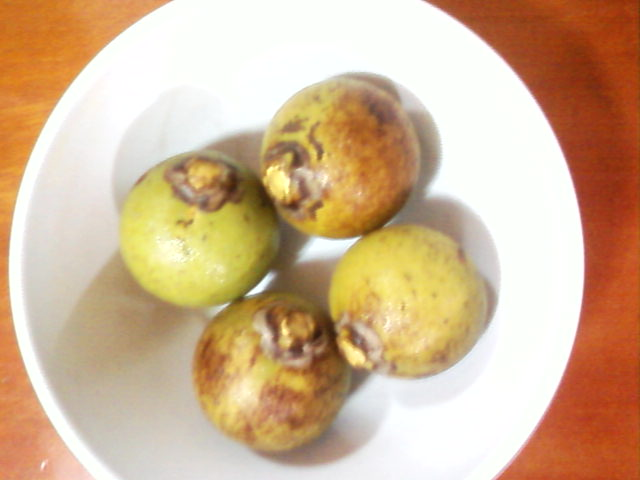
Edible fruits of macaúba-barriguda
