= Palm wine =

Alcoholic beverage made from palm sap

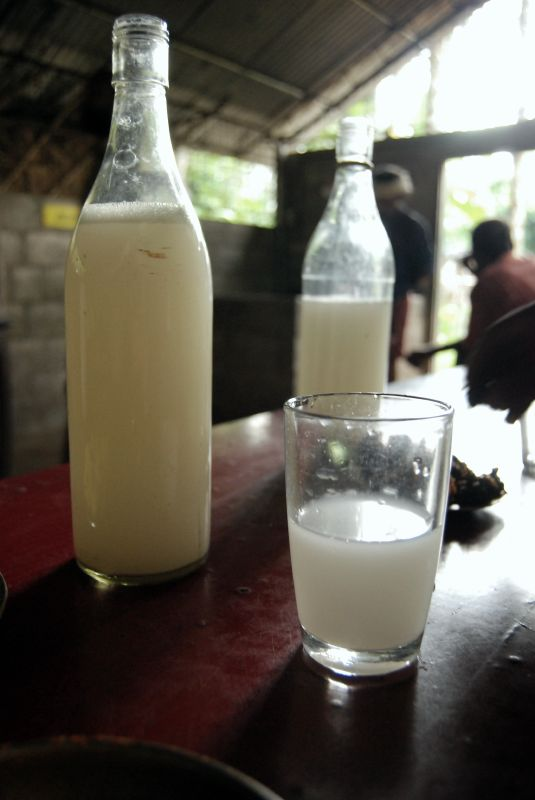
- Bottles and a glass of palm wine
- Type: Alcoholic drink
- Origin: Africa and Asia
- Introduced: Neolithic
- Alcohol by volume: typically 4–8%
- Proof (US): 8–16°
- Color: White
- Ingredients: Fermented sap of palm trees
- Related products: Ogogoro, coyol wine, Desi daru

Palm wine, known by several local names, is an alcoholic beverage created from the sap of various species of palm trees such as the palmyra, date palms, and coconut palms. It is known by various names in different regions and is common in various parts of Africa, the Caribbean, South America, South Asia, Southeast Asia, and Micronesia. Smallholder and individual farmers may promote conservation through palm wine production, as palm trees provide a regular household income that may be worth more than timber sales.

== Tapping ==
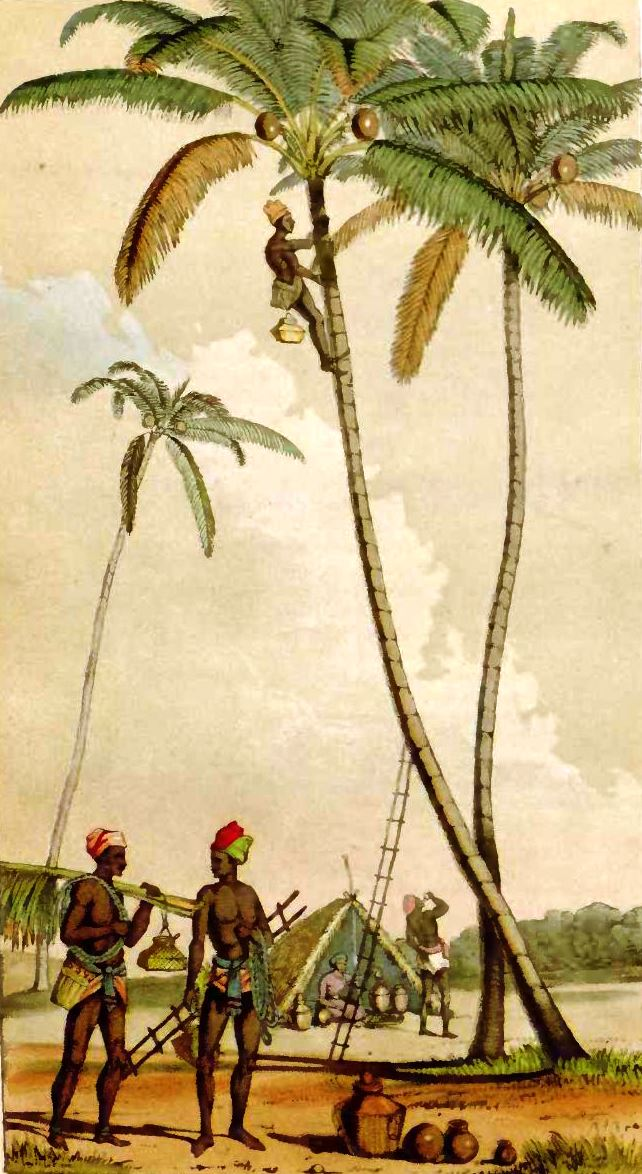
Toddy collectors at work on Cocos nucifera palms

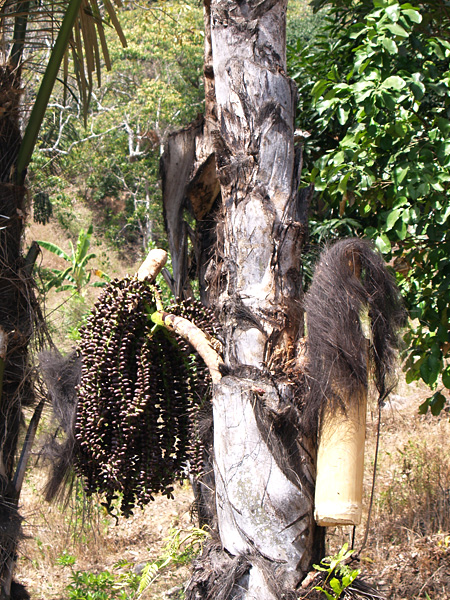
Tapping palm sap in East Timor

Thati Kallu in Nekkonda Village Warangal Telangana India

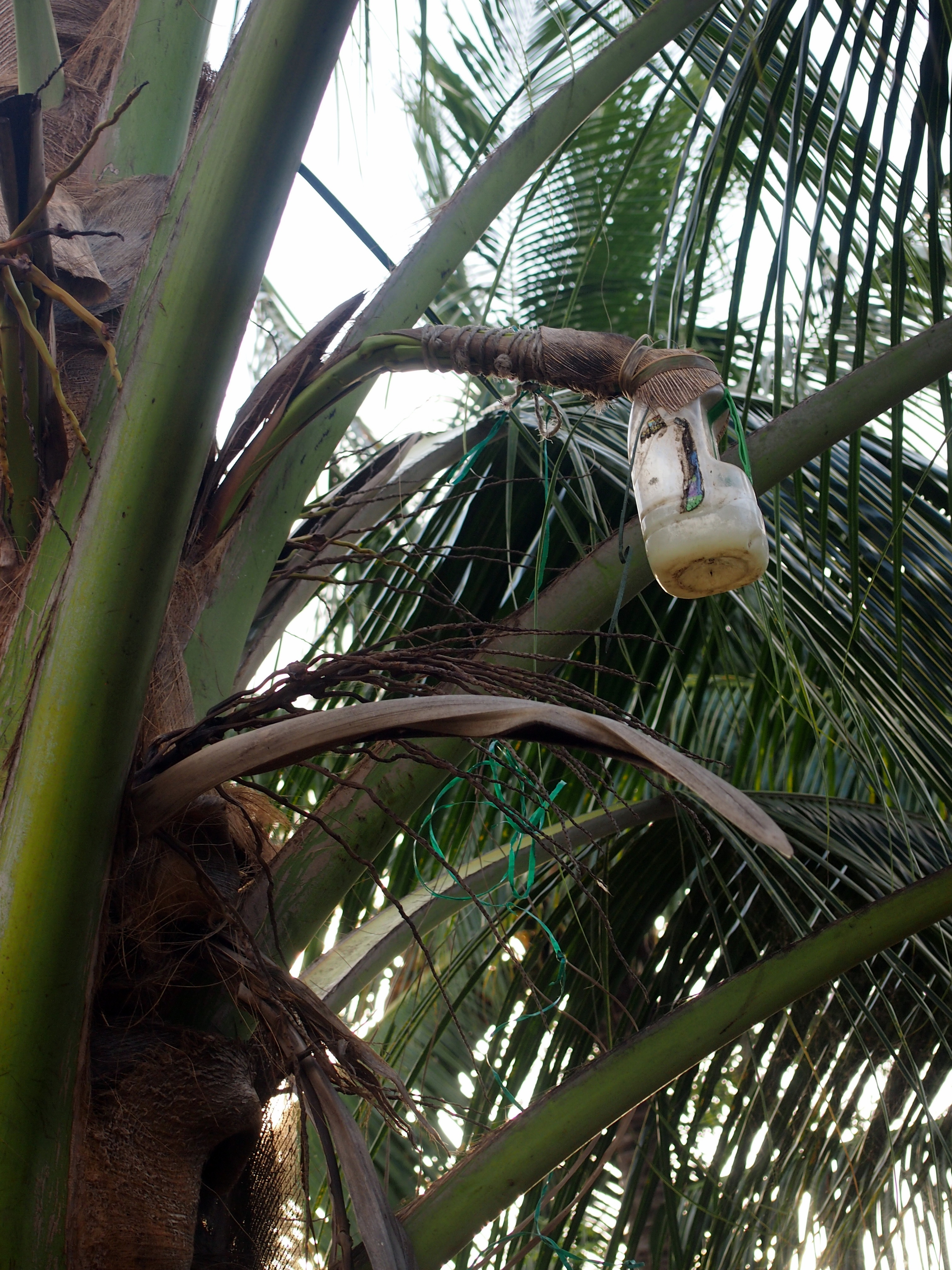
Tapping palm sap in Kenya

A tapper extracts and collects the sap. Typically, the sap is collected from the palm tree's cut flower. A container is fastened to the flower stump to collect the sap. The white liquid that initially collects is usually very sweet and non-alcoholic before it is fermented. An alternative method is the felling of the entire tree. Where this is practiced, people sometimes light a fire at the cut end to help collect sap.

Palm sap begins fermenting immediately after collection, due to natural yeasts in the air (often spurred by residual yeast left in the collecting container). Within two hours, fermentation yields an aromatic, sweet wine with up to 4% alcohol and mildly intoxicating effects. Producers may let the wine ferment longer, up to a day, to produce a stronger, sourer, more acidic taste that some people prefer. Longer fermentation produces vinegar instead of stronger wine.

== Distilled ==
Palm wine may be distilled to create a stronger drink, which goes by different names depending on the region (e.g., arrack, palm feni, id:sopi, village gin, charayam, and country whiskey).

In Nigeria, this is commonly called palm wine. In southwestern Nigeria and some parts of Cameroon, it is also known as Emu or Matango. In southeastern Nigeria, it is generally called Mmanya Ngwo or referred to colloquially as Tombo. In both Congos, it is called nsámbá. In parts of southern Ghana, distilled palm wine is called akpeteshi or burukutu. In Togo and Benin, it is called atan; in Tunisia, lagmi. In coastal parts of Kenya, it is known as mnazi. In India, it is called toddy. In Ivory Coast, it is called koutoukou.

In the Philippines, the most common distilled palm liquor is lambanog, which is made from aged tubâ. It has very high alcohol by volume, at 40–45% abv (80 to 90 proof).

== Consumption by region ==
=== Africa ===
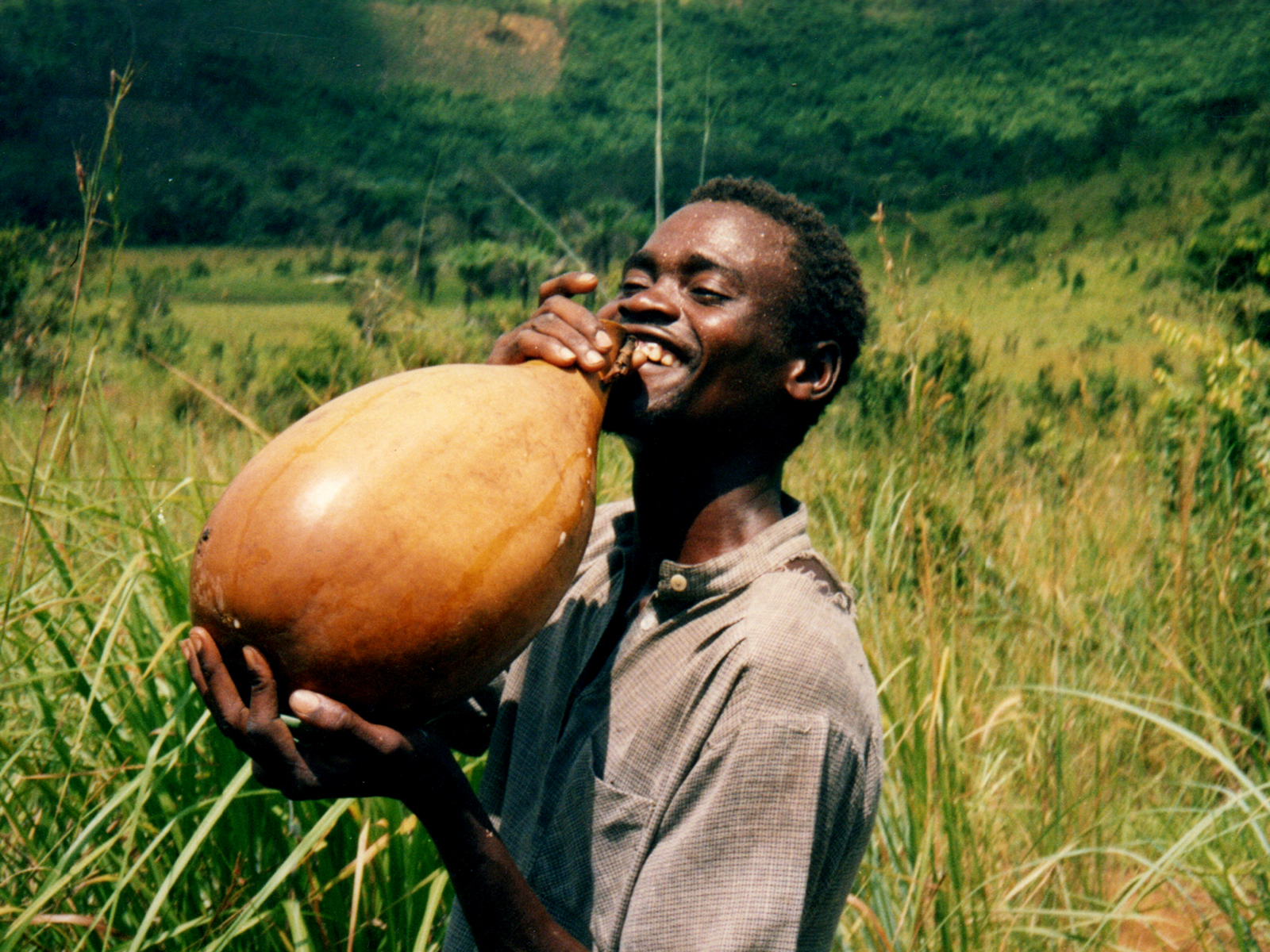
Palm wine is collected, fermented, and stored in calabashes in Bandundu Province, Democratic Republic of the Congo (c. 1990).

In Africa, the sap used to create palm wine is most often taken from wild date palms such as the silver date palm (Phoenix sylvestris), the palmyra, and the jaggery palm (Caryota urens), or oil palm such as the African oil palm (Elaeis guineense) or from Raffia palms, kithul palms, or nipa palms. In part of the central and western Democratic Republic of the Congo, palm wine is called malafu.

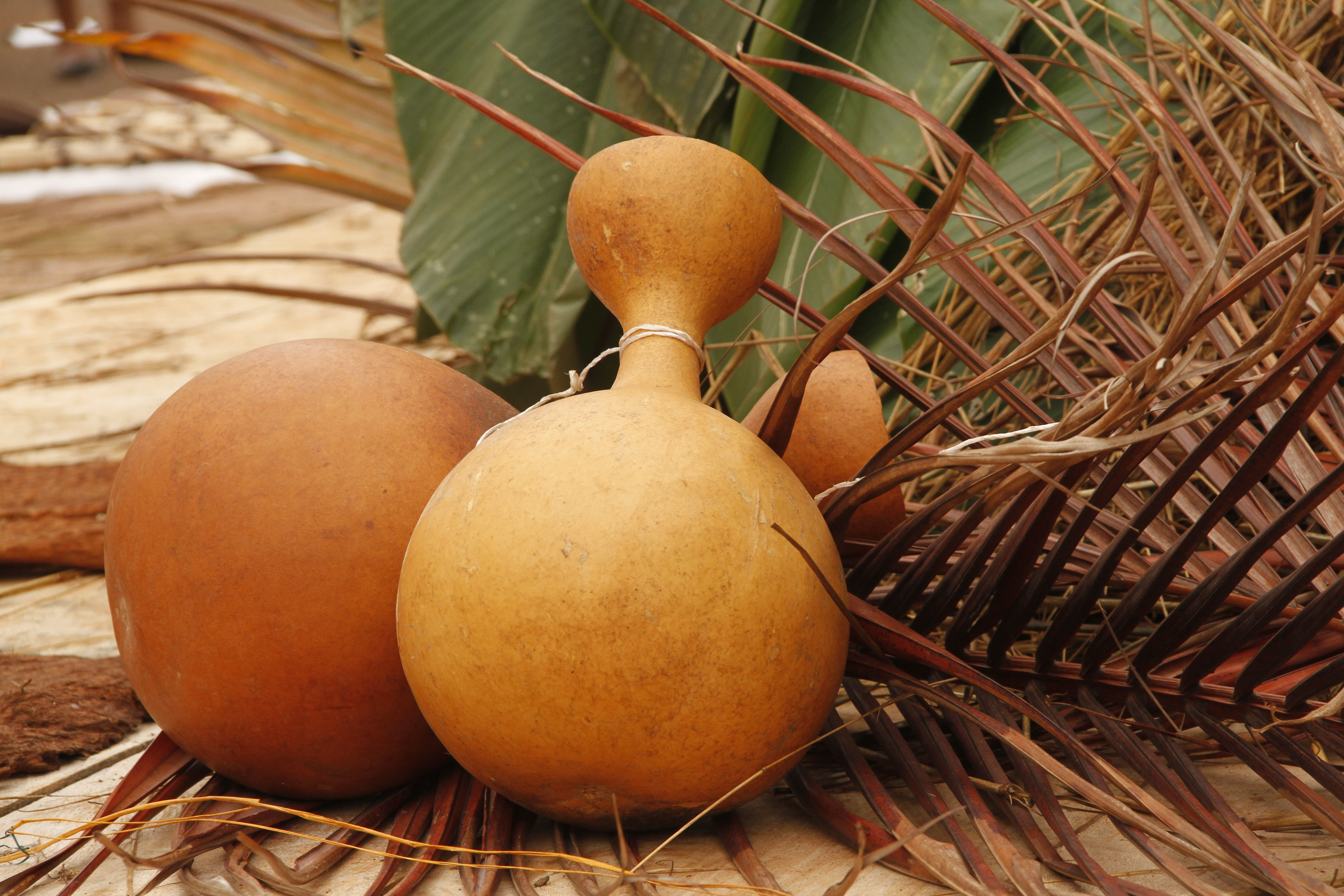
Image of Calabash for palm wine storage

Palm wine plays an important role in many ceremonies in many tribes and nations of Nigeria such as among the Igbo and Yoruba peoples, and elsewhere in Central and Western Africa. Guests at weddings, birth celebrations, funerals, and gatherings to observe important festivals and holidays are served in generous quantities. People often infuse palm wine with medicinal herbs to treat a wide variety of physical complaints. As a token of respect to deceased ancestors, many drinking sessions begin with a small amount of palm wine spilled on the ground (Kulosa malafu in Kikongo ya Leta). Men and women enjoy palm wine, although women usually drink it in less public venues.

In parts of southeastern Nigeria, namely Igboland, palm wine is locally called "mmanya ocha" (literally, "white drink"), with variants like "ngwo" and "nkwu". It plays a very important role in traditional Igbo settings. In Urualla, for instance, and other "ideato" towns, it is the drink of choice for traditional weddings. A young man going for the first introduction at his in-laws' house must bring palm wine. The amount of palm wine required varies depending on regional customs in Igboland. This custom is similar in Cameroon's neighboring northwestern region (North West Region).

Poyo is a fermented drink made in Sierra Leone from various palm tree species. In Sierra Leone, poyo plays an important role in local life. According to the Limbas people, one of Sierra Leone's oldest ethnic groups, whoever brings poyo brings life. People serve it at weddings, birth celebrations, and funeral wakes.

Four types of palm wine are found in the central and southern Democratic Republic of the Congo. From the oil palm comes ngasi, dibondo comes from the raffia palm, cocoti from the coconut palm, and mahusu from a short palm that grows in the savannah areas of western Bandundu and Kasai provinces.

=== South Asia ===
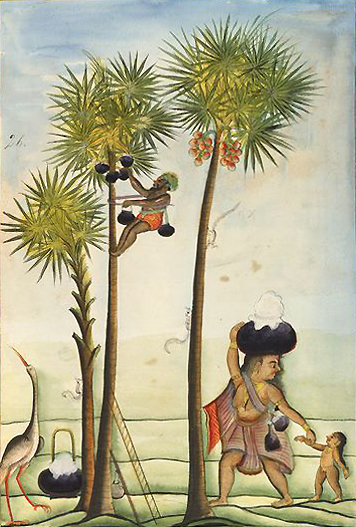
Toddy-tapper climbing a toddy palm in Madras, c. 1785

In South Asian countries such as Bangladesh, India, and Sri Lanka, coconut palms and Palmyra palms (Borassus species) are preferred. People mainly produce it from the lala palm (Hyphaene coriacea) by cutting the stem and collecting the sap. In some areas of India, palm wine is evaporated to produce the unrefined sugar called jaggery.

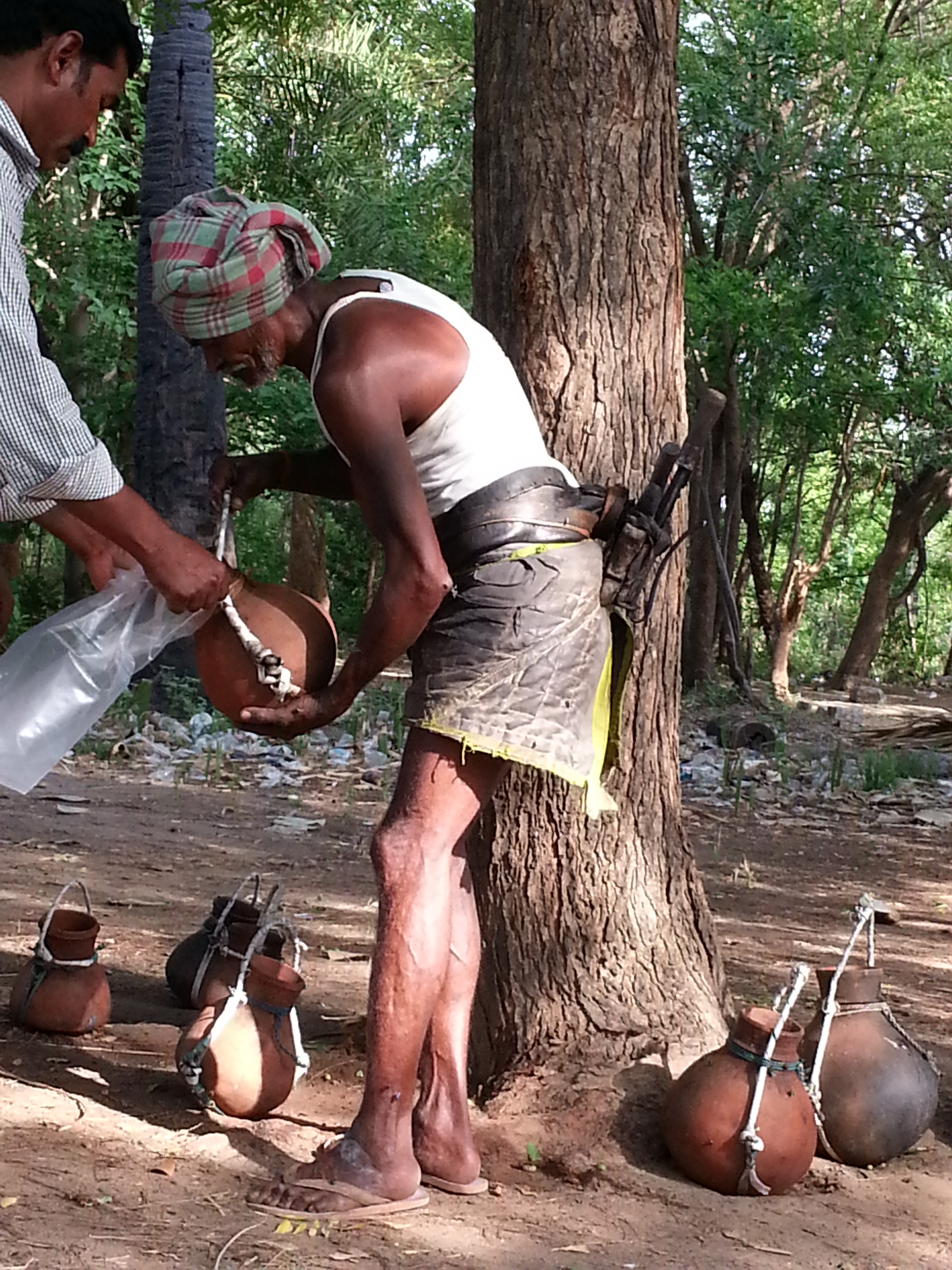
A toddy tapper in the state of Telangana selling toddy (2014)

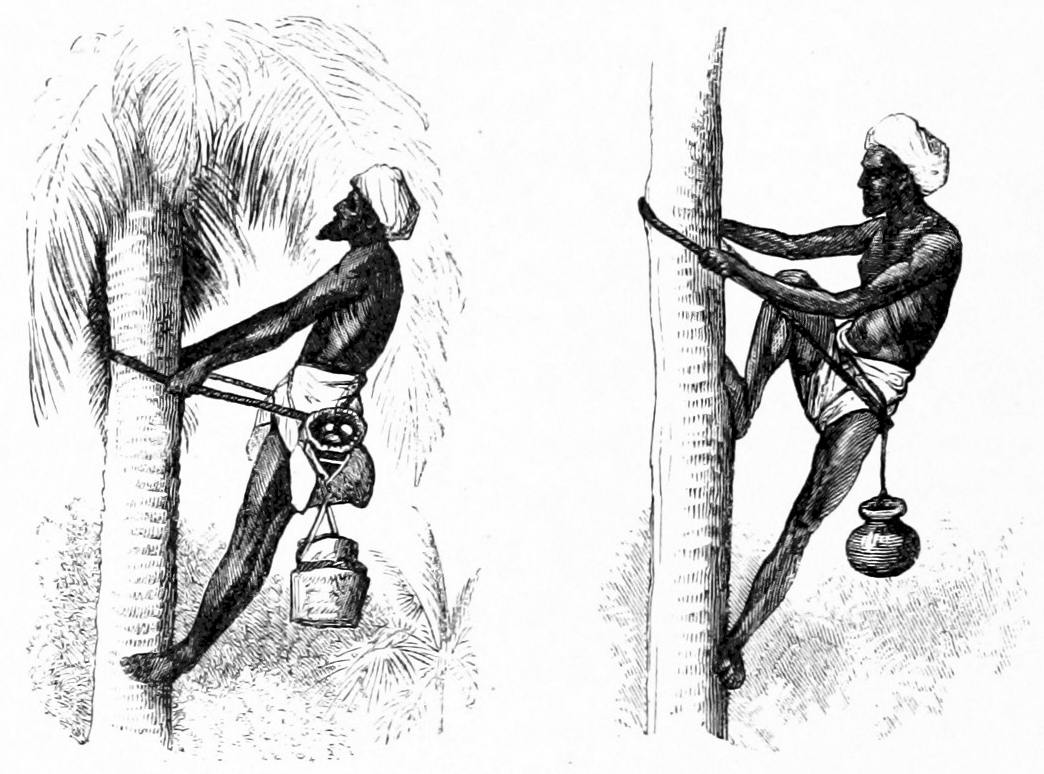
Toddy Drawer in India, 1870

In parts of India, the unfermented sap is called neera (patanīr in Tamil Nadu) and is refrigerated, stored, and distributed by semi-government agencies. A small amount of lime (calcium hydroxide) is added to the sap to prevent fermentation. Like fruit juice products, neera is relatively rich in potassium.

In India, palm wine or toddy is served as either neera or patanīr (a sweet, non-alcoholic beverage derived from fresh sap) or kallu (a sour beverage made from fermented sap, but not as strong as wine). Palm sap contains natural yeasts, which perform the fermentation of glucose to alcohol, as well as acetobacter, which subsequently converts the alcohol to acetic acid (vinegar). The optimal time to drink is one day after tapping, when vinegar content is minimal; after that, it becomes increasingly sour. Some palm wine drinkers prefer their beverage more sour than usual, but fermenting too long turns it into vinegar rather than wine. Refrigeration extends the beverage's life, and a variety of spices also contribute to flavor.

In India, palm wine is usually available at toddy shops (known as kallu śāp in Malayalam, kallu kaḍai in Tamil, kalita gaḍaṅg in Tulu, kallu dukānaṁ in Telugu, kallu aṅgaḍi in Kannada). In Tamil Nadu, this beverage is currently banned, though the legality fluctuates with politics. In the absence of legal toddy, moonshine distillers of arrack often sell methanol-contaminated alcohol, which can have lethal consequences. To discourage this practice, authorities have pushed for inexpensive "Indian Made Foreign Liquor" (IMFL).

In Telangana and Andhra Pradesh (India), toddy is a popular rural drink, often consumed at the end of the day after work.

There are two main types of toddy (kallu) in the states of Telangana and Andhra Pradesh, namely tāḍi kallu (Telugu: తాటికల్లు) (from Toddy Palmyra trees) and īta kallu (Telugu: ఈతకల్లు, from silver date palms). Īta kallu is very sweet and less intoxicating, whereas tāḍi kallu is stronger (sweet in the morning, becoming sour to bitter-sour in the evening) and is highly intoxicating. People enjoy kallu right at the trees where they bring it down. They drink from leaves, holding them to their mouths while the Goud pours the kallu from the biṅki (kallu pot). There are different types of toddy according to the season: poḍḍataḍu, parpuḍtaḍu, paṇḍuḍtaḍu.

In the Indian state of Kerala, toddy leavens a local form of hopper called vellayappam (as a substitute for yeast). Toddy is mixed with rice dough and left overnight to aid fermentation and expand the dough, causing it to rise and making the bread soft when prepared.

In Kerala, toddy is sold under a license issued by the excise department and it is an industry having more than 50,000 employees with a welfare board under the labor department. It is also used to prepare a soft variety of Sanna, which is famous in parts of Karnataka and Goa in India.

=== Indonesia and Malaysia ===
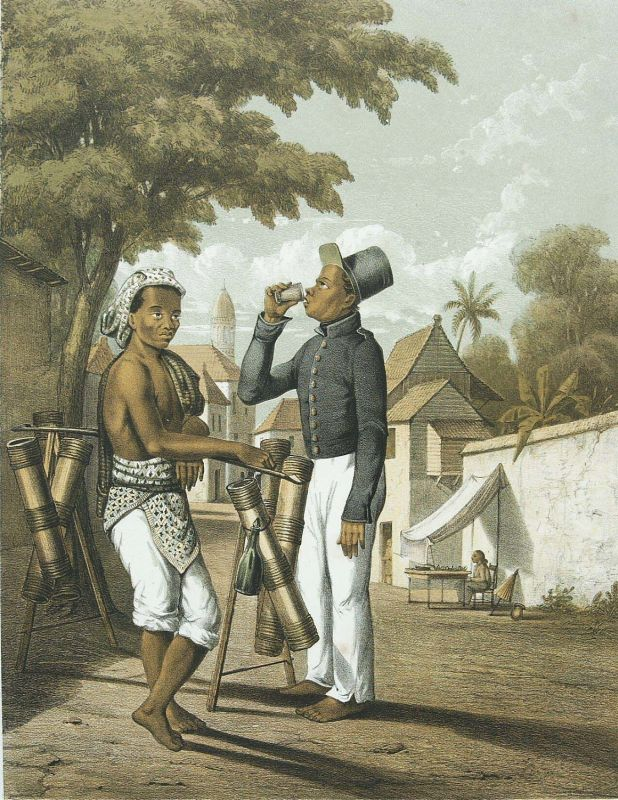
Lithograph of a tuak vendor and a native Royal Netherlands East Indies Army (KNIL) soldier consuming the drink (1854)

The drink refer to both palm wine and rice wine, is imbibed in Sumatra, Sulawesi, Kalimantan, and Bali of Indonesia and parts of Malaysia such as Sarawak in East Malaysia. The beverage is popular among the Ibans and Dayaks during the Gawai festivals, weddings, and other special occasions, and when hosting guests. The Batak people of North Sumatra also consume palm wine, with palm sap mixed with raru bark to make tuak. People serve the brew at stalls along with snacks. The same word is used for other drinks in Indonesia, for example, those made using fermented rice. Another palm wine, the bahar, which is mixed with the rosok tree bark, is a speciality among the Dusun of Sabah's West Coast and Kudat divisions.

=== Myanmar ===
Palm wine, called htan yay (ထန်းရည်) in Burmese, made from the fermented sap of the toddy palm, is traditionally consumed in rural parts of Upper Myanmar. Toddy palm wine is traditionally produced in the country's Dry Zone.

=== Singapore ===
Palm toddy was historically a popular working-class drink, particularly for the Indian community, since it was cheaper than beer. Sales were restricted to on-premises drinking at government-run toddy shops, the last of which closed in 1979. Legal sales resumed in 2022 when a first batch was imported from Malaysia.

=== Mexico ===
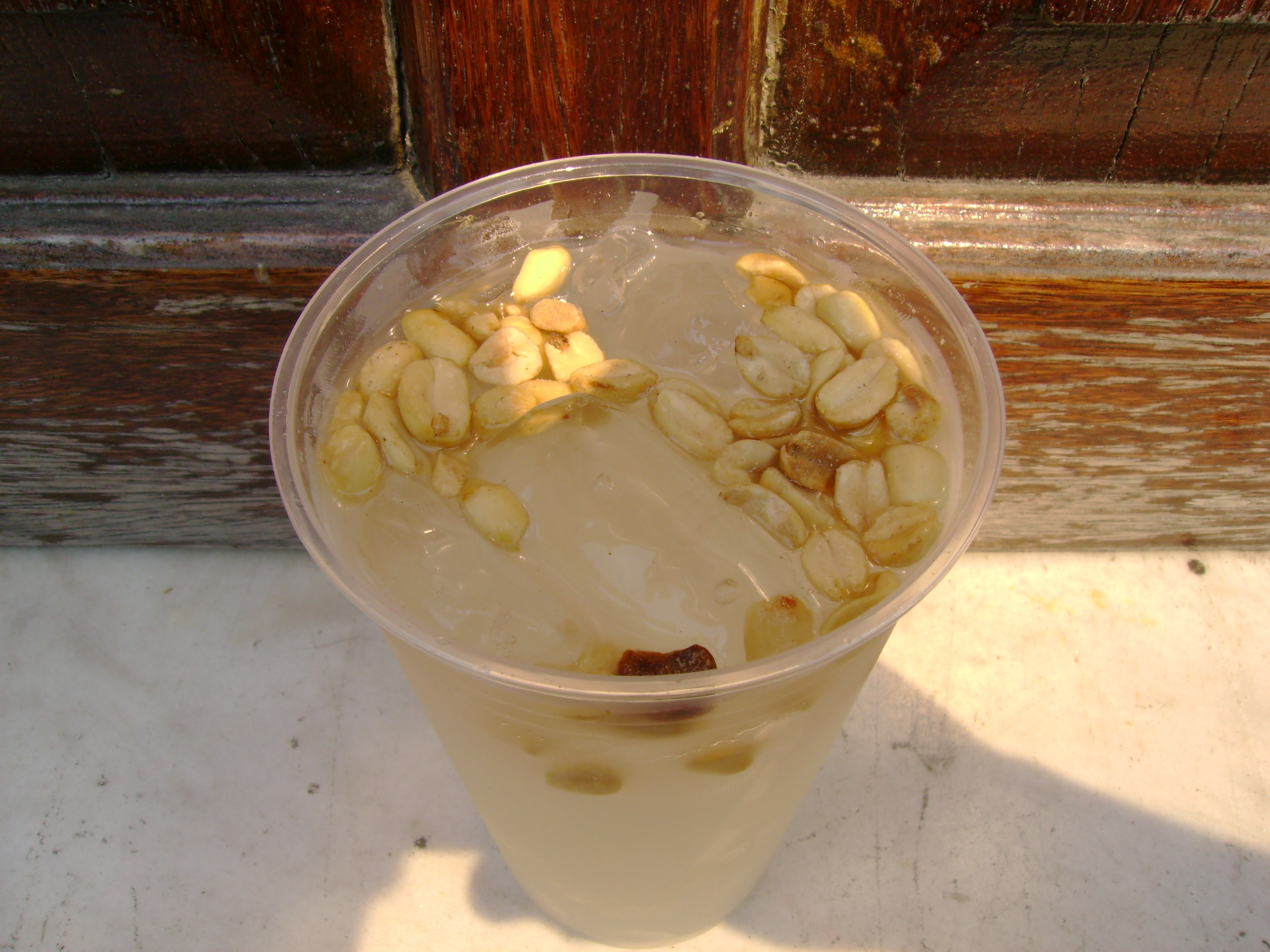
Tuba fresca from Colima, Mexico; a non-alcoholic drink made from coconut sap derived from Philippine tubâ

Mexican tuba made from coconut sap is common in western Mexico, especially in the states of Colima, Jalisco, Michoacán, and Guerrero. Coconuts are not native to the Americas. The Manila Galleons brought them from the Philippines to Acapulco, along with tuba manufacturing. Mexican tuba is made in the same way as Filipino tubâ. The traditional sap collectors are known as tuberos (which also means "plumber" in both Mexico and the Philippines). It became so popular that in 1619, Captain Sebastian de Piñeda wrote to King Philip III of Spain complaining about the Filipino "Indio" settlers in Nueva España who were causing significant loss of profits to Iberian alcohol exporters due to tuba.

Mexican tuba is also commonly sold as tuba fresca, a non-alcoholic version made from fresh coconut sap. Street vendors traditionally sell it in large bottle gourds, mixed with coconut milk, ice, and sugar. They usually top it with peanuts and diced fruit.

=== Philippines ===
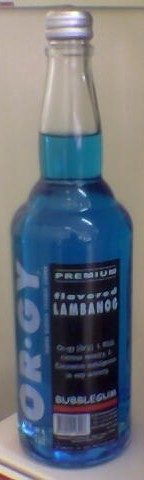
Bubblegum-flavored lambanog, a palm wine from the Philippines

People widely consume palm wines in the Philippines, and they are part of the traditional palm vinegar industry. They are gathered mostly from coconuts, nipa palms, or kaong palms. Palm wines fermented for a few days to a few weeks are generally called tubâ. Two notable traditional derivations of tubâ have higher alcohol contents. The first is distilled liquor, generally known as lambanog (coconut) and laksoy (nipa palm). They are milky white to clear. The second is the bahalina, which is typically deep brown-orange due to the use of bark extracts from the mangrove Ceriops tagal.

Other types of palm wines indigenous to the islands include subtypes of tubâ like tuhak or tubâ sa hidikup which is made from kaong palm sap, and tunggang which is made from fishtail palm sap.

On the island of Leyte in the central Philippines, the red tubâ is aged with tanbark for up to six months to two years, until it turns dark red and tapping its glass container produces a deep, hollow sound. This type of tubâ is called bahal (for tubâ aged this way for up to six months) and bahalina (for tubâ aged thus for up to a year or more).

=== South America ===
Production of palm wine may have contributed to the endangered status of the Chilean wine palm (Jubaea chilensis).

=== Other areas ===
In Tuvalu, toddy production can be seen in palm trees tapped along Funafuti International Airport. In Kiribati, it is called Karewe; people drink freshly tapped sap from coconut spathes and ferment it into an alcoholic beverage. Karewe is boiled down to a thick light brown liquid, called kamwaimwai, used as a sweetener and spread.

== Consumption by animals ==
Some small pollinating mammals consume large amounts of fermented palm nectar as part of their diet, especially the Southeast Asian pen-tailed treeshrew. The inflorescences of the bertam palm contain populations of yeast that ferment the nectar to up to 3.8% alcohol (average: 0.6%). Treeshrews metabolize the alcohol very efficiently and do not appear to get drunk on the fermented nectar.

Megabats have been known to drink from containers of harvested palm sap and then urinate into the containers, leading to the transmission of the Nipah virus.

== Names ==
There are a variety of regional names for palm wine:

State / Territory / Region	Name used
Algeria	لاقمي lāgmi
Bangladesh	তাড়ি taṛi, তাড়ু taṛu, tuak
Benin	sodavi (distilled), sodabe, atan
Cambodia	tek tnaot chu (ទឹកត្នោតជូរ)
Cameroon	mimbo, matango, mbuh, palm wine, tumbu liquor, vin de palme, miluh
Central America	vino de coyol
People's Republic of China	棕榈酒 zōng lǘ jiǔ
Democratic Republic of the Congo	malafu ya ngasi (Kikongo), masanga ya mbila (Lingala), vin de palme (French)
East Timor	tuaka, tua mutin, brandy is called tua sabu
Equatorial Guinea	topé (most widespread name), also called bahú in the north and mahú in the south
Gabon	toutou
Gambia	singer
Ghana	doka, nsafufuo, palm wine, yabra, dεha, tér daññ, Akpeteshi (when it is further distilled)
Guam	tuba (originated from the Philippines)
India	Toddy in English கள்ளு kaḷḷu in Tamil കള്ള് kaḷḷŭ in Malayalam ಕಳ್ಳು kaḷḷu or sendi in Kannada kali in Tulu తాటి కల్లు tāṭi kallu in Telugu; Tadi in Assam, Odisha, Uttar Pradesh, Bihar and Maharashtra তাড়ি taṛi in Bengali sur in Konkani; Tadi in Bhojpuri
Indonesia	arak or tuak. In Batak region, North Sumatra: lapo tuak. In South Sulawesi (especially in Tana Toraja): ballo. In North Sulawesi: saguer Java Island: Lahang (from the sugar palm) and the alcoholic ꦠꦸꦄꦏ꧀ ꦭꦺꦒꦺꦤ꧀ Tuak Legen (from the palmyra palm) Bali Island: ᬢᬸᬅᬓ᭄ Tuak (from the palmyra palm) and a stronger one is ᬅᬭᬓ᭄ ᬩᬮᬶ Arak Bali
Ivory Coast	bandji, koutoukou (when it is further distilled)
Kenya	mnazi (which means coconut palm in Mijikenda)
Kiribati	karewe
Libya	لاقبي lāgbi [ˈlaːɡbi]
Madagascar	soura
Malaysia	nira (Malay for fresh juice obtained from the blossom of the coconut, palm or sugar-palm, which can be made into sugar or the said palm wine, which is also known as tuak), toddy (English), bahar (Kadazan/Dusun), goribon (Rungus), tuba (Borneo)
Maldives	ދޯރާ، ރުކުރާ، މީރާ (dōrā, rukurā, mīrā)
Mali	bandji, sibiji, chimichama
Marianas	tuba (originated from the Philippines)
Mexico	tuba (garnished with peanuts, originated from the Philippines)
Myanmar	ထန်းရည် htan yay
Namibia	omulunga, palm-wine
Nauru	demangi
Nepal	tāri तारि
Nigeria	palm-wine, palmy, ukọt nsuñ, mmin efik, emu, oguro, tombo liquor, mmanya ngwo, nkwu enu, nkwu ocha
Papua New Guinea	segero, tuak
Philippines	tubâ (general term for fermented and unfermented palm sap), lambanóg (distilled coconut sap, also vino de coco, dalisay de coco), laksoy (distilled nipa palm sap, also dalisay de nipa, barik), bahalina or bahal (aged tubâ with mangrove bark extracts), tuhak or tubâ sa hidikup (sugar palm wine), tunggang (fishtail palm wine), dalisay (general term for distilled palm liquor)
Seychelles	kalou
Sierra Leone	poyo, mampama
South Africa	ubusulu, injemane
Sri Lanka	රා rā (Sinhala), கள்ளு kaḷḷu (Tamil), panam culloo
Tanzania	pómbe (which means alcohol) or tembo
Thailand	kache (กะแช่), namtanmao (น้ำตาลเมา)
Tunisia	لاقمي lāgmi
Tuvalu	kaleve (unfermented), kao (fermented), or in English, toddy (unfermented), sour toddy (fermented)
Vietnam	rượu dừa

^{a} Telugu, Tamil and Malayalam.
^{b} Marathi.

== Gallery ==
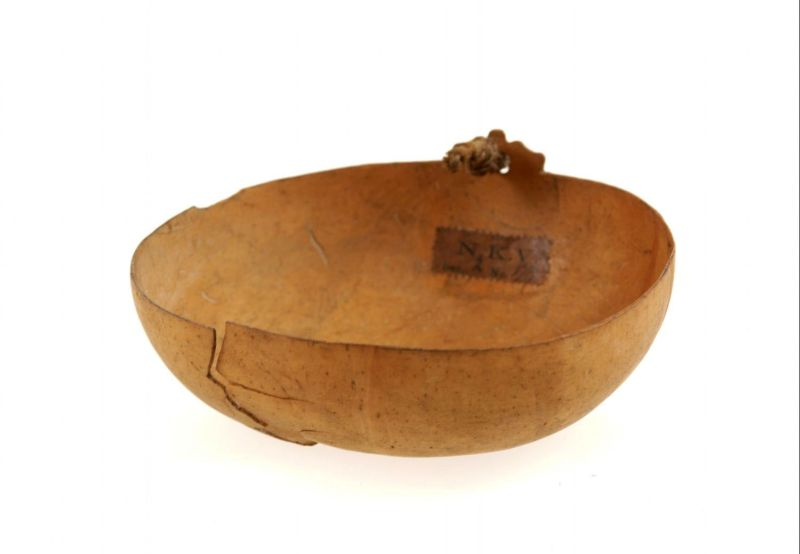
Bowl for tuak drinking made from a gourd (late 19th century)

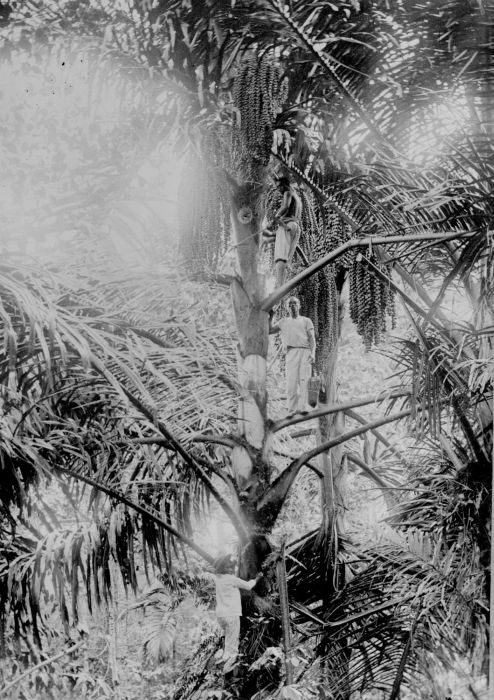
Tapping the sap of the immature flower flasks in "arènpalm" (Arenga pinnata), one of the palms used to make palm wine, in Ambon, Moluccas (1919). The wine was called toewak (Dutch), tuak, or sagoweer (saguer). People also drank the fresh sap, "sugar water".

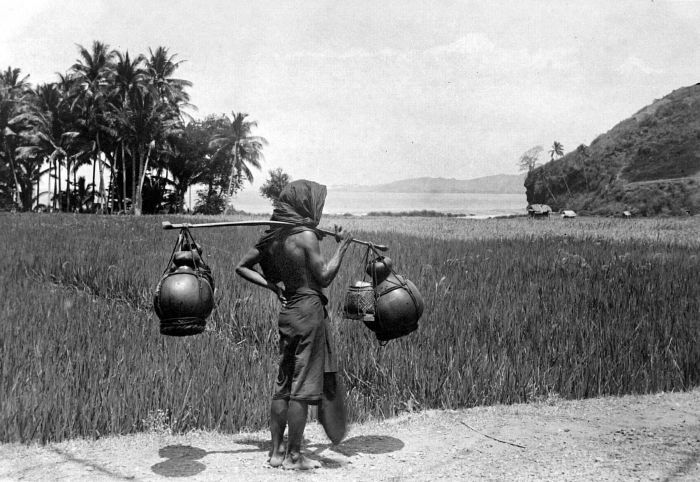
Palm wine seller in Bali (1929)

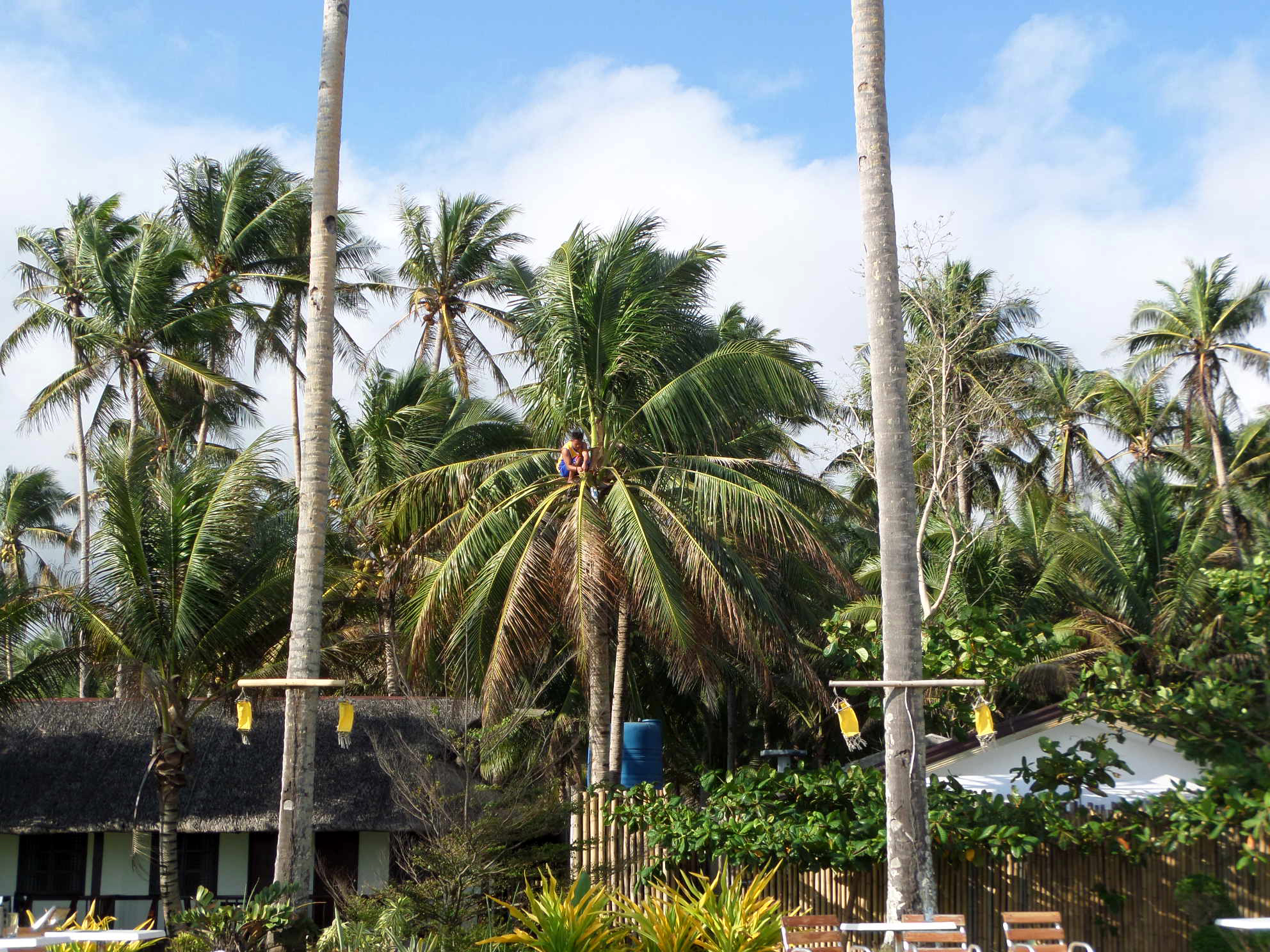
Taken in Southern Leyte, Philippines, where a tuba gatherer climbs a coconut tree to harvest some tuba

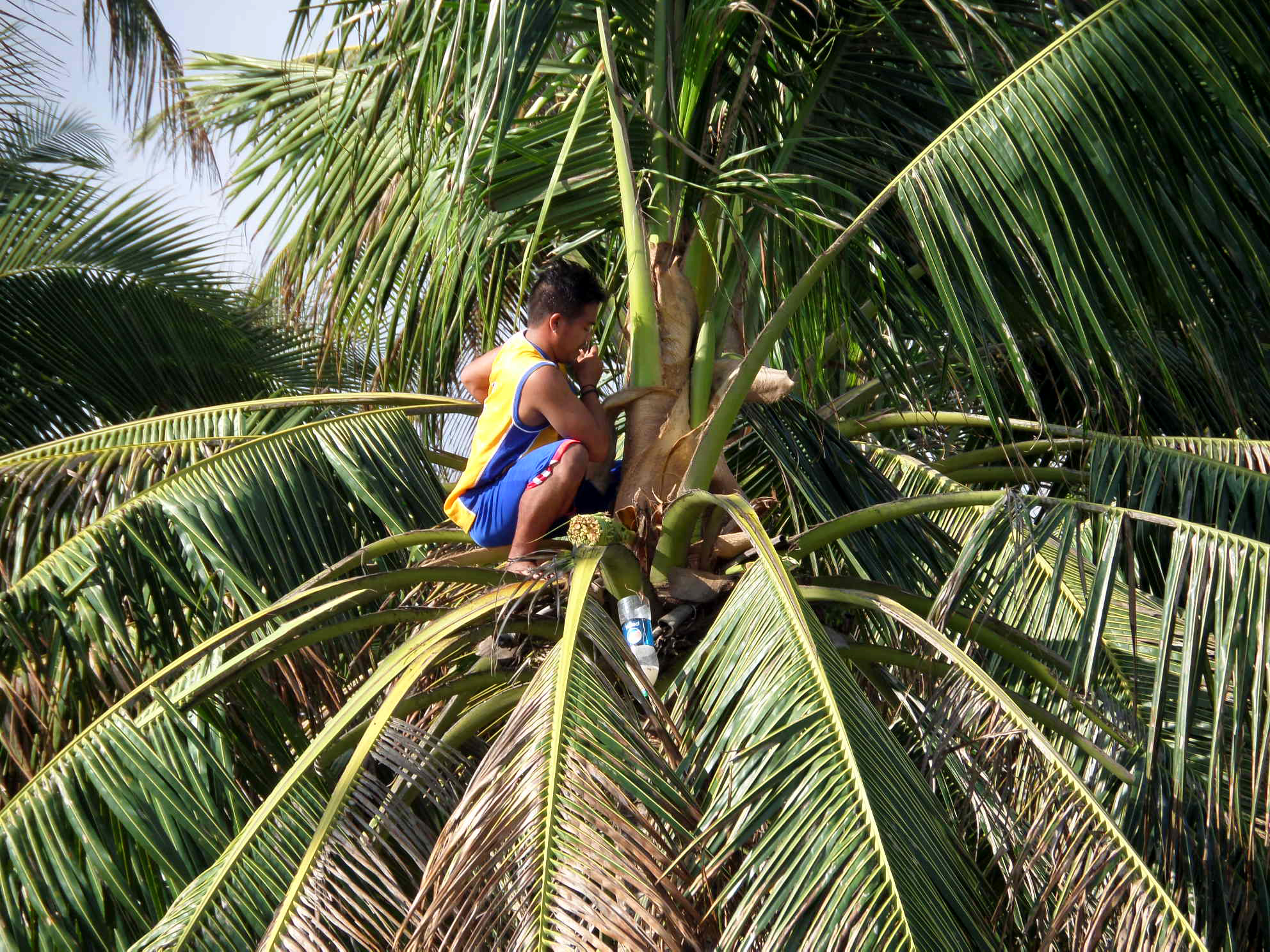
Sitting on the coconut palm while gathering tuba

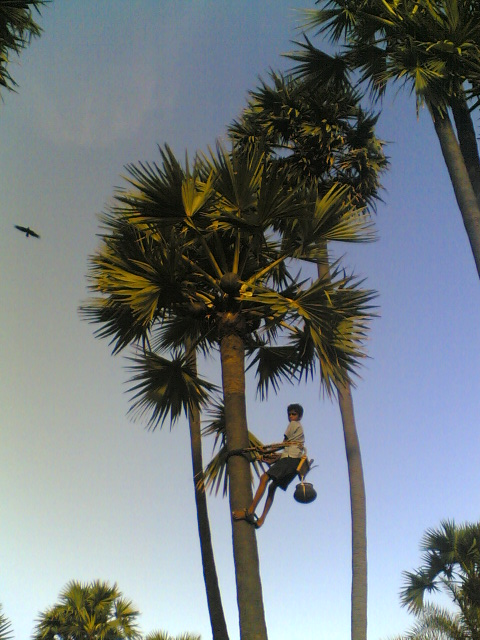
A young toddy-picker climbing a palm tree to collect palm sap, Visakhapatnam, India

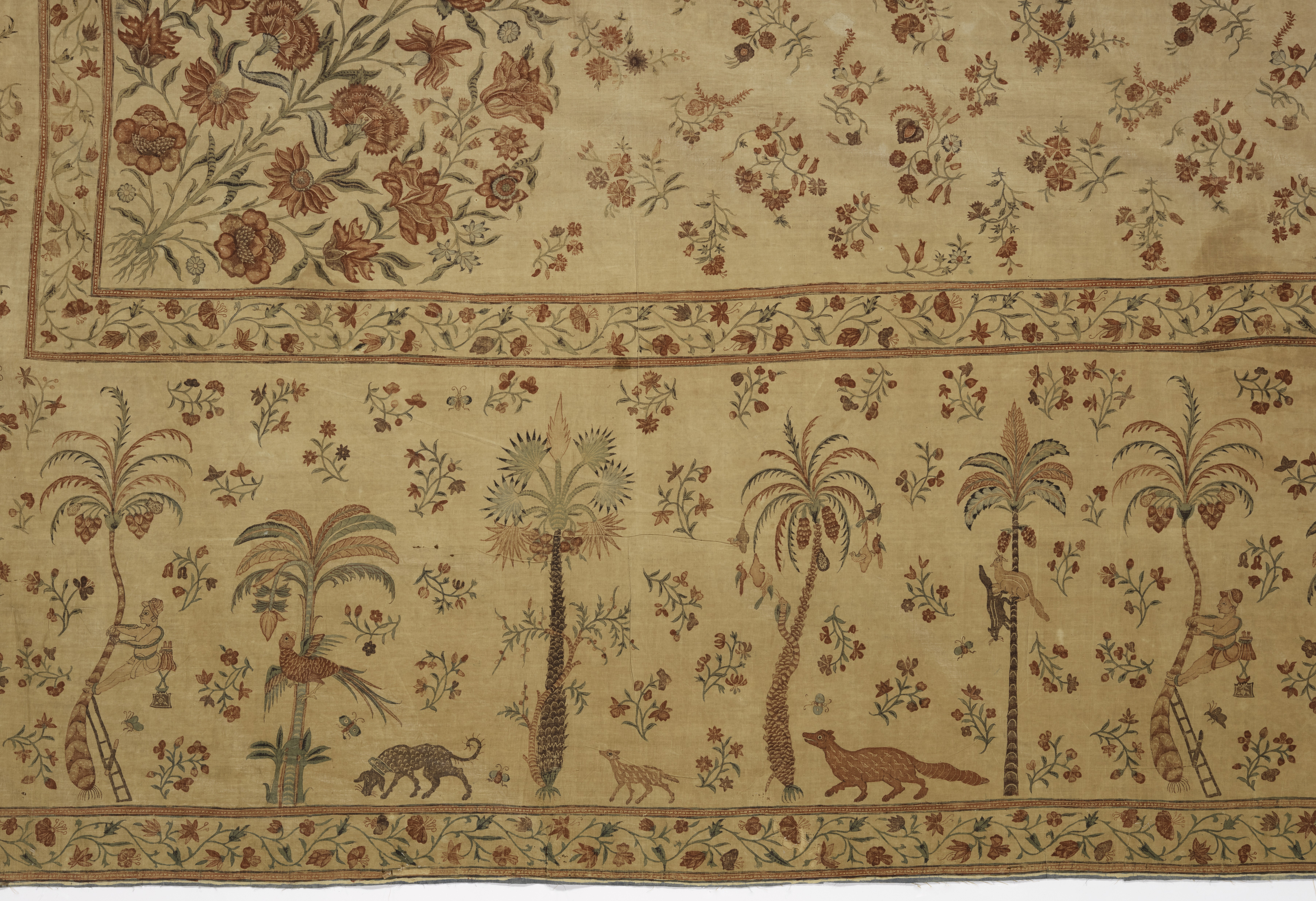
Palampore tapestry depicting toddy tappers, India, 1750 CE

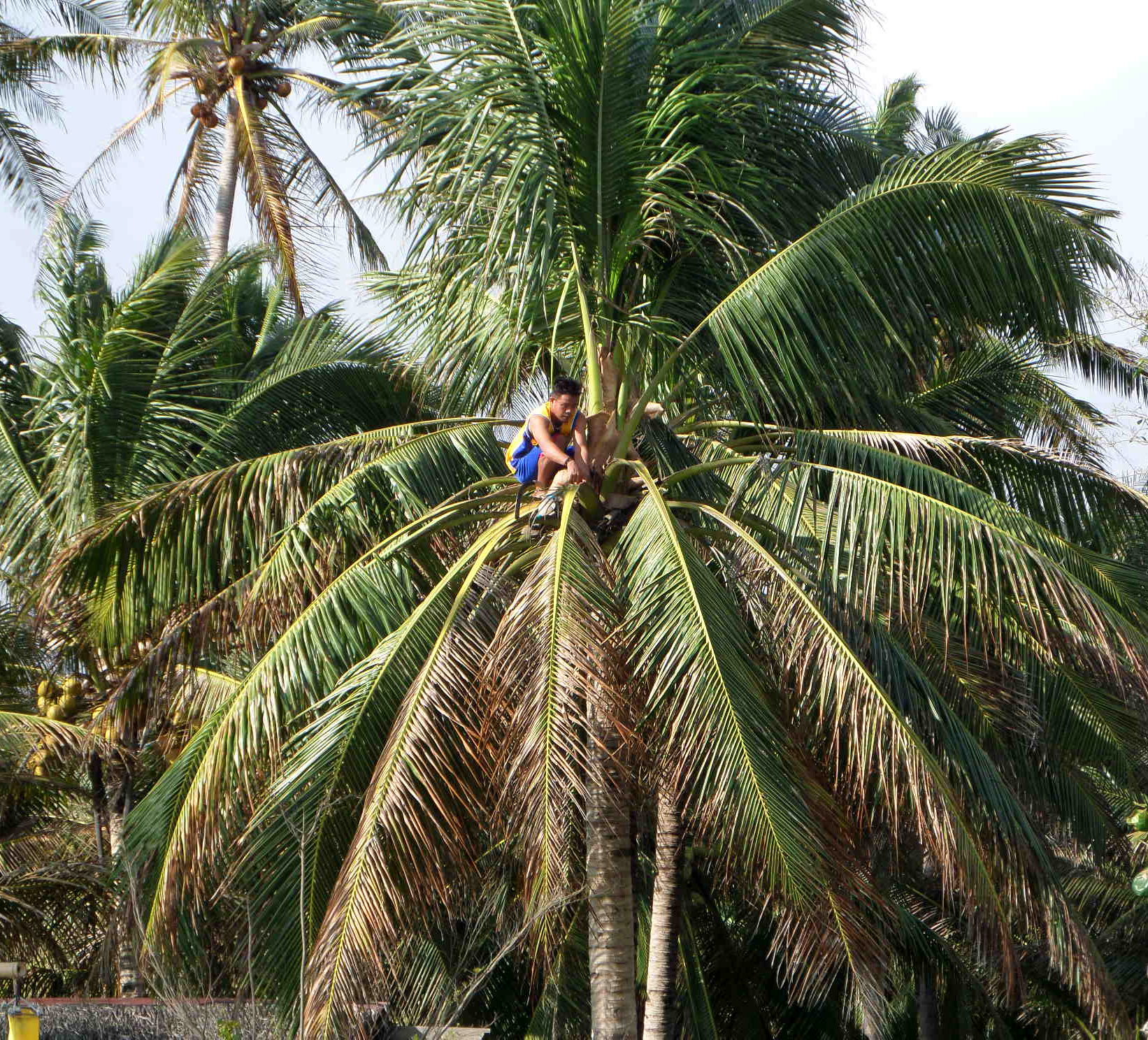
Locally called "manananggot" for tuba gatherer

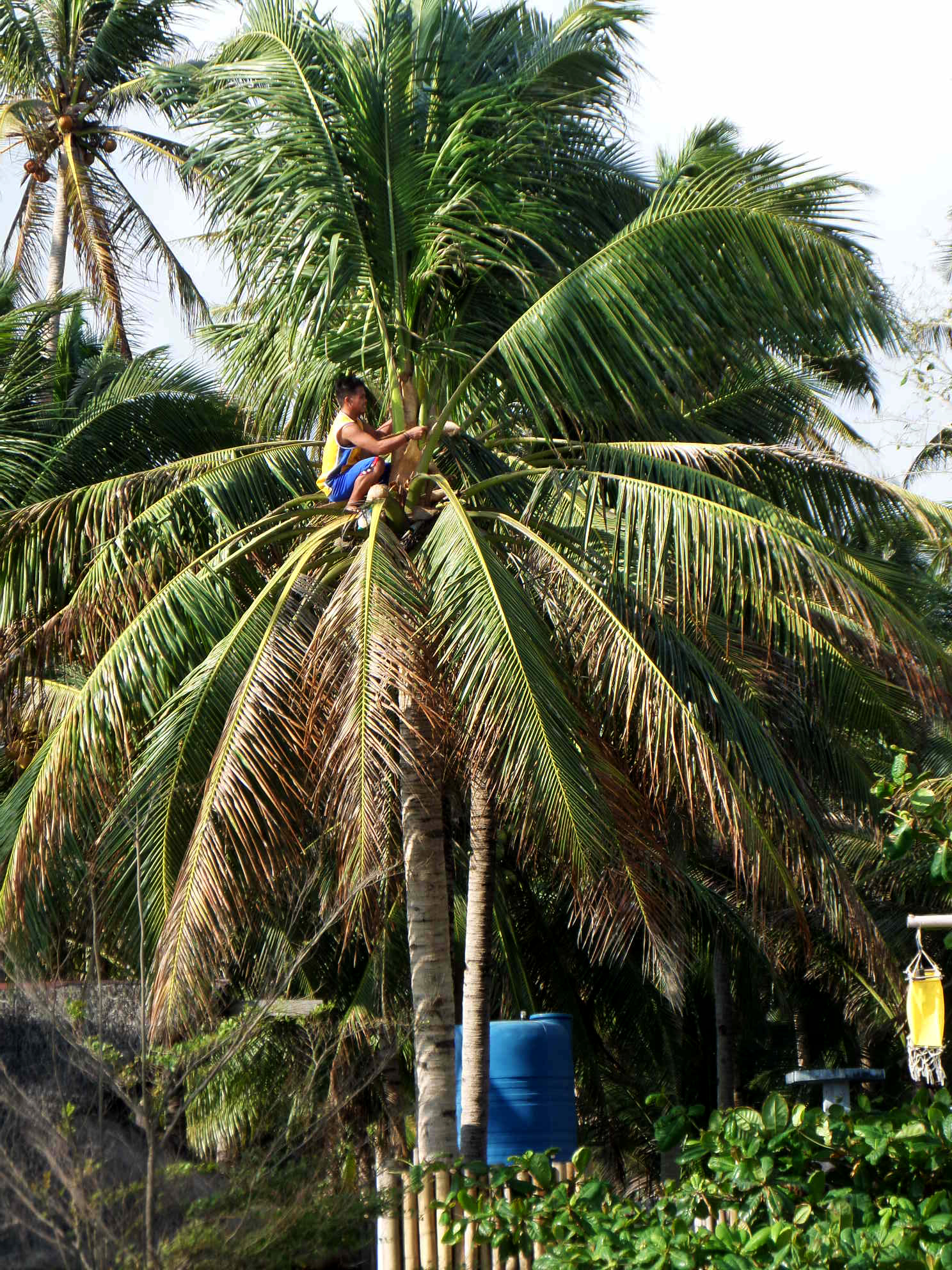
Gathering tuba from the coconut tree

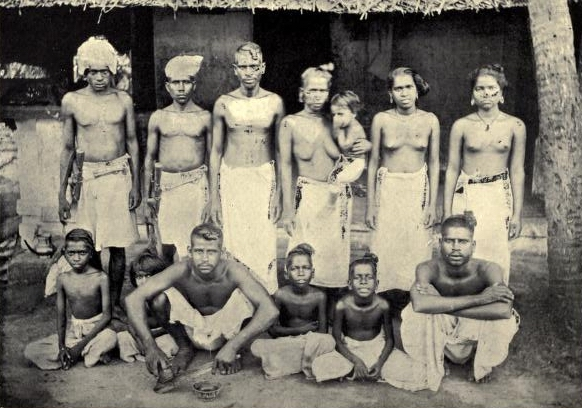
Thiyyas, traditional toddy tappers of North Malabar region

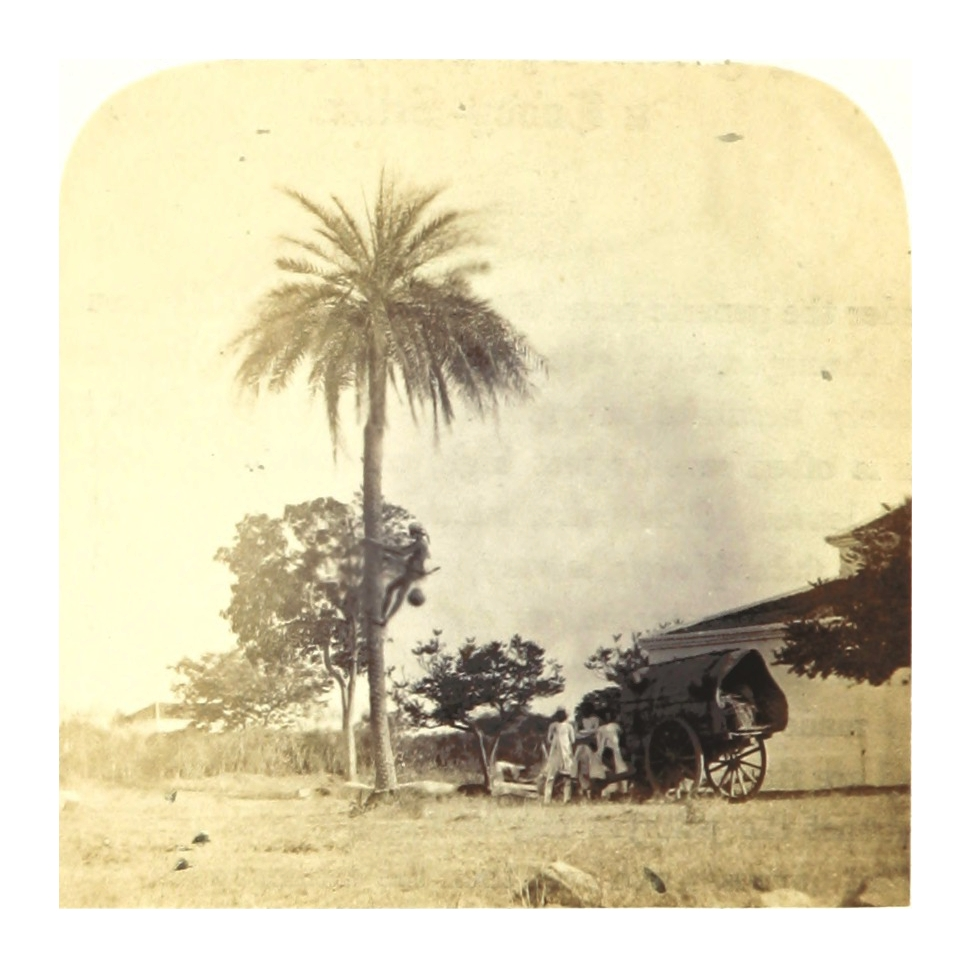
Toddy tapper at work, India, c. 1862

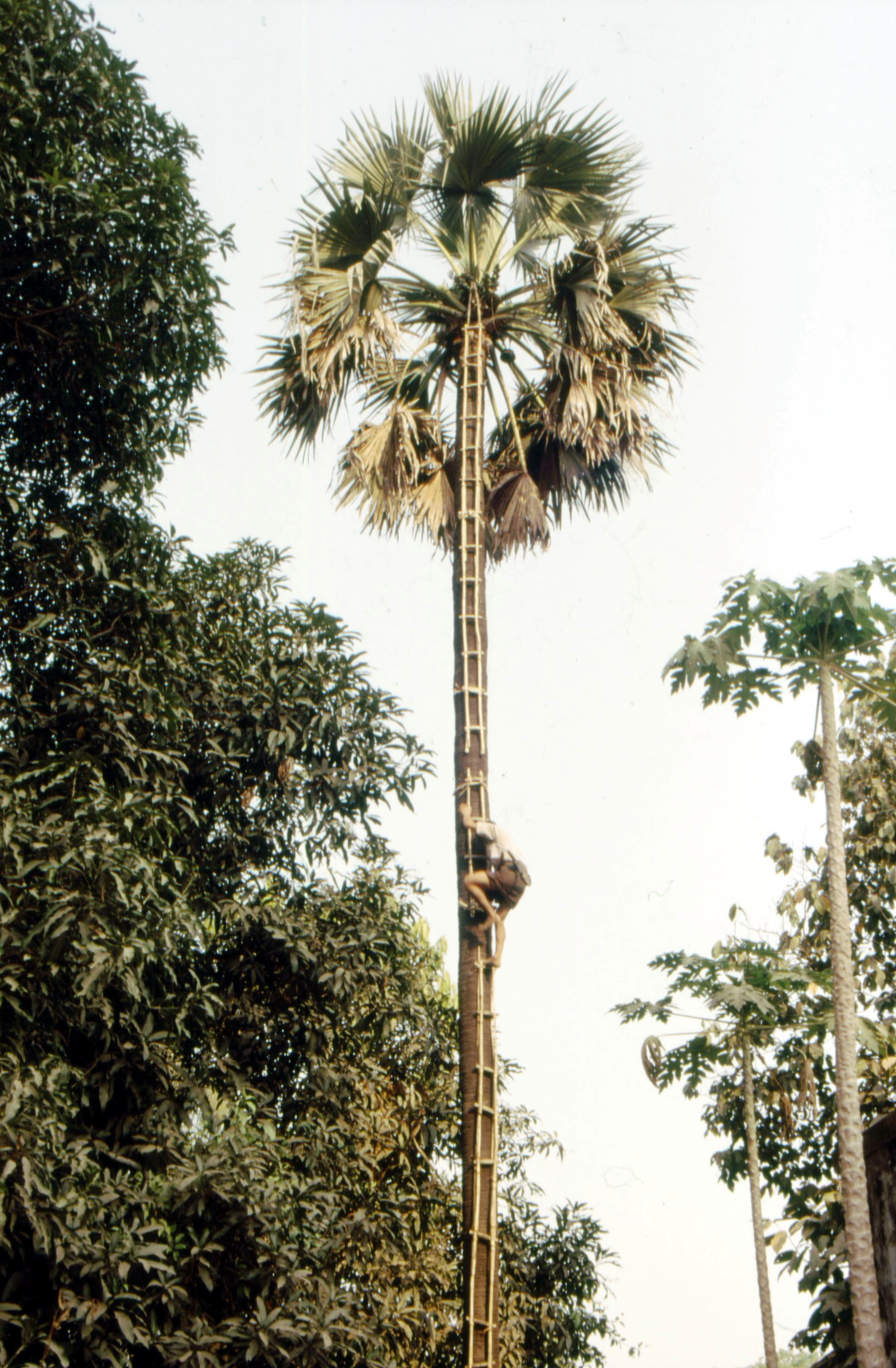
Toddy tapper climbing palm tree with a hanging ladder, India

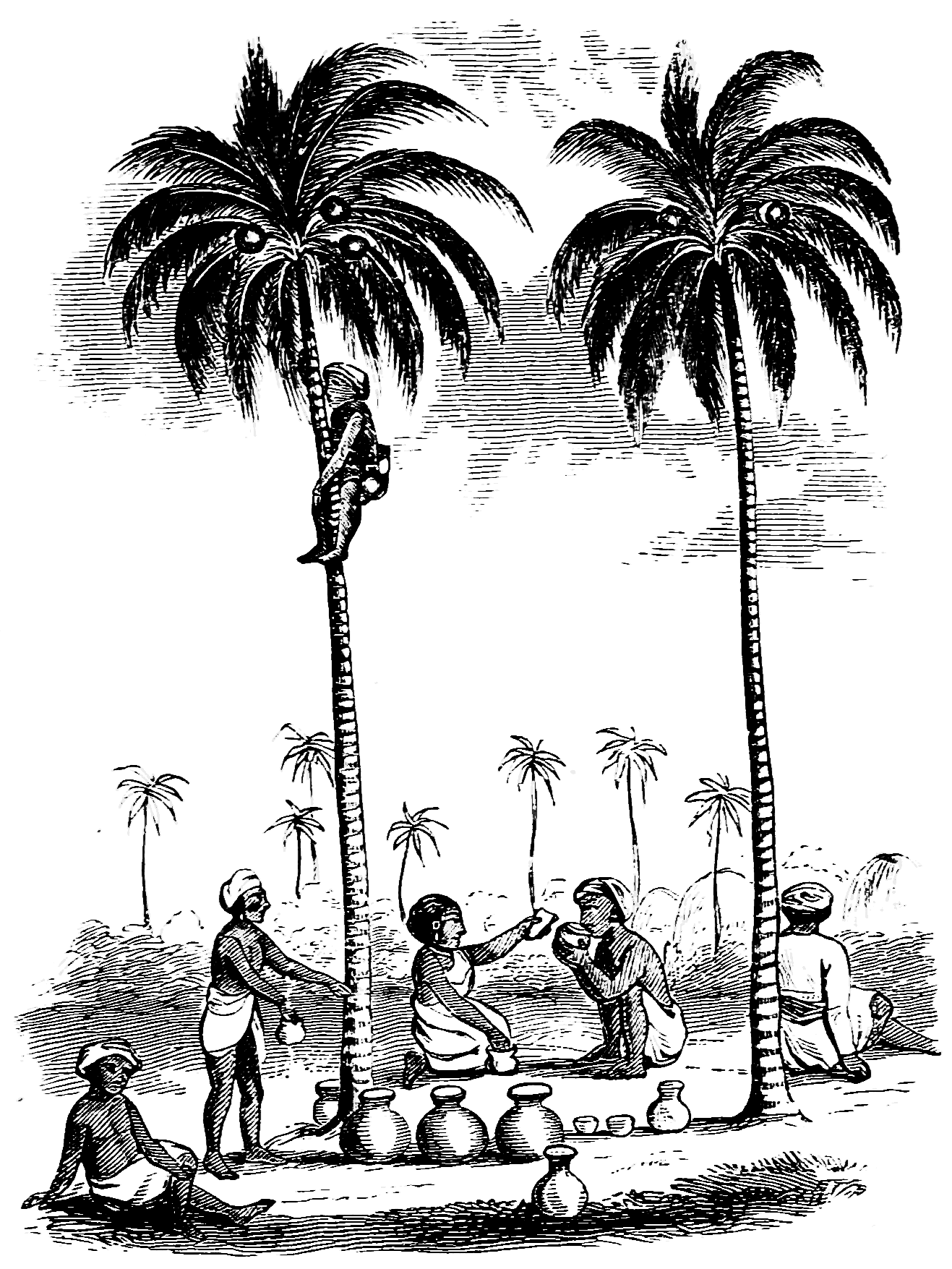
Coconut trees, and toddy gatherers of Southern India (1855)

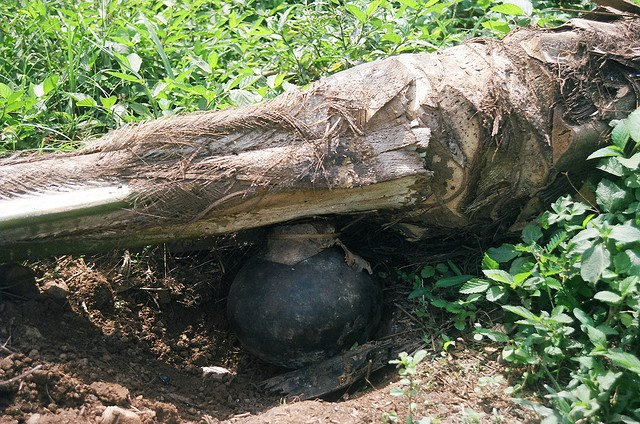
Palmwine

== In popular culture ==
Palm wine tapping and consumption recur as motifs in the Chinua Achebe novel Things Fall Apart, and in the Amos Tutuola novel The Palm-Wine Drinkard. It is also mentioned in the 2006 movie Blood Diamond. A few characters drink it in a part of The Color Purple, when visiting with a fictional West African Tribe called the Olinka.

== See also ==
- Arrack, an alcoholic beverage distilled from coconut palm wine in Southeast Asia.
- Coyol wine
- Desi daru
- Madurai Veeran, a deity who consumes toddy.
- Ogogoro
- Palm-wine music, a West African musical genre.
- Pulque
- Sree Muthappan, another deity who consumes toddy.
- List of Indonesian beverages
