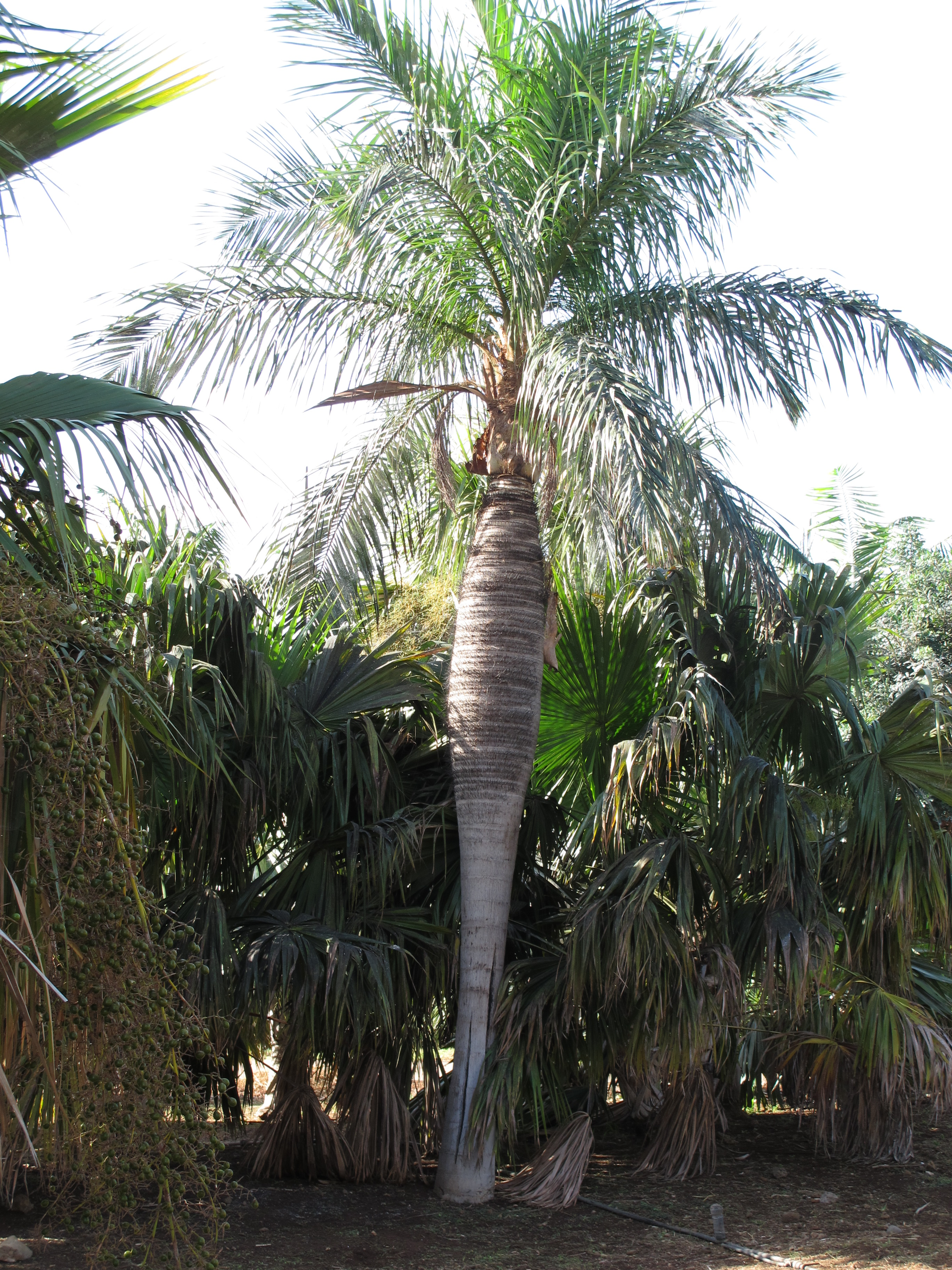

Conservation status
- Least Concern (IUCN 3.1)

Scientific classification
- Kingdom: Plantae
- Clade: Tracheophytes
- Clade: Angiosperms
- Clade: Monocots
- Clade: Commelinids
- Order: Arecales
- Family: Arecaceae
- Genus: Acrocomia
- Species: A. crispa

Binomial name
- Acrocomia crispa (Kunth) C.F.Baker ex. Becc.

Synonyms
- Acrocomia armentalis (Morales) L.H. Bailey; Gastrococos crispa (Kunth) H.E. Moore; Acrocomia lasiospatha Griseb.; Astrocaryum crispum (Kunth) Gomez Maca; Cocos crispa Kunth; Gastrococos armentalis Morales

= Acrocomia crispa =

Species of palm

Acrocomia crispa, also known as the Cuban belly palm or corojo, a palm species which is endemic to Cuba. Formerly placed in its own genus, Gastrococos, recent work found that that genus was nested within Acrocomia. It is a tall, spiny palm with a trunk that is slender at the base, but swollen in the middle, giving it the name "Cuban belly palm" in English. The young palm tree stems are edible by humans and animals; the ripe fruit ripe is used to produce cooking oil and for animal feed.

== Description ==
Acrocomia crispa is a single-stemmed palm tree with pinnately-compound leaves. Stems are 7–18 m (23–59 ft) tall, with a distinct, "spindle-shaped" bulge halfway up the stem. Trunks are densely spiny, but becomes smooth and grey as the trunk ages. Trees have 10-20 leaves which are up to 3 m (10 ft) with leaflets which are approximately opposite.

== Taxonomy ==
The species was first described by as Cocos crispa by Carl Sigismund Kunth in 1816 based on an incomplete specimen collected by Alexander von Humboldt and Aimé Bonpland. In 1866 Sebastián Alfredo de Morales described Gastrococcus armentalis based on a distinct type species. Although Morales was able to examine the specimen that Kunth's species was based on, he concluded that the two collections represented different species. In 1912, based on Charles Fuller Baker's description, Odoardo Beccari published a formal description Acrocomia crispa, in which he included Kunth's C. cripsa.
