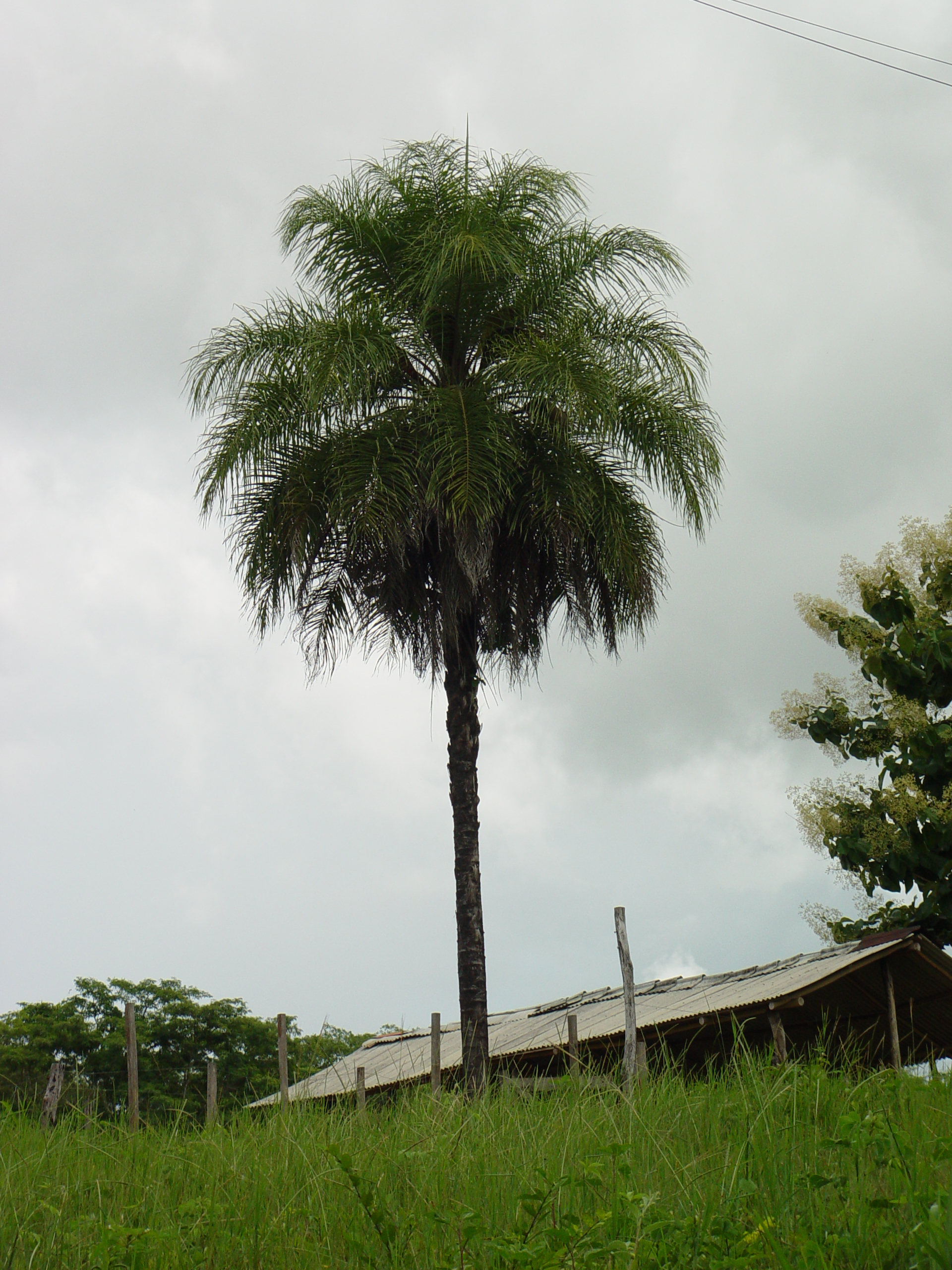
- Acrocomia aculeata

Scientific classification
- Kingdom: Plantae
- Clade: Embryophytes
- Clade: Tracheophytes
- Clade: Angiosperms
- Clade: Monocots
- Clade: Commelinids
- Order: Arecales
- Family: Arecaceae
- Subfamily: Arecoideae
- Tribe: Cocoseae
- Genus: Acrocomia; Mart.

Synonyms
- Gastrococos Morales; Acanthococos Barb.Rodr.

= Acrocomia =

Genus of palms

Acrocomia is a genus of palms which is native to the Neotropics, ranging from Mexico in the north, through Central America and the Caribbean, and through South America south to Argentina.

== Description ==
Acrocomia is a genus of spiny, pinnate-leaved palms which range from large trees to small palms with short, subterranean stems.

The species bears branched inflorescences which are located among the leaves. The flowers are unisexual; female flowers are born near the base of the inflorescence, while male flowers are borne towards the tips. Fruits are large, single-seeded, and vary in colour from yellow, to orange, to brown.

Acrocomia is considered to be at an early phase of development as an alternative and multipurpose crop.

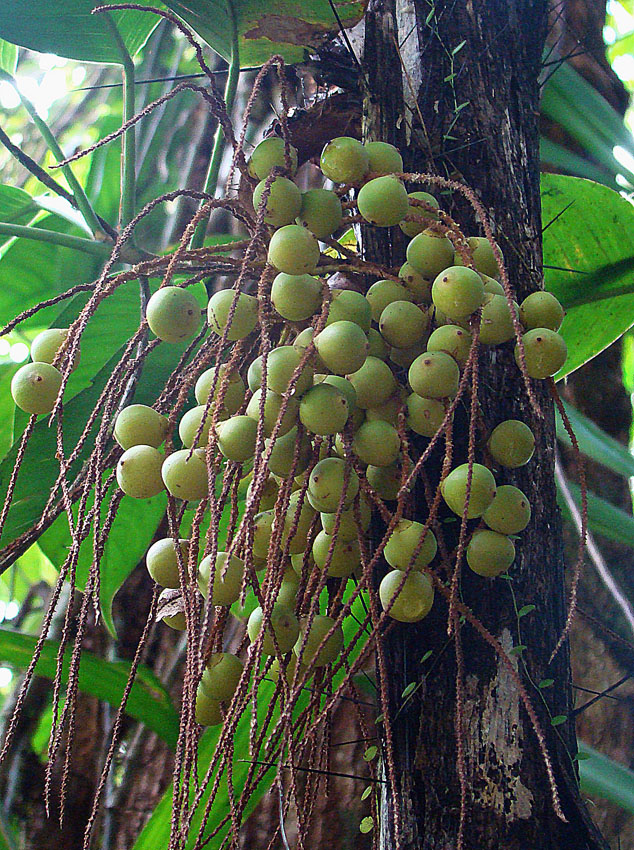
Acrocomia aculeata immature fruits.

== Species ==
- Acrocomia aculeata (Jacq.) Lodd. ex R.Keith - Mexico, Central America, West Indies, northern South America
- Acrocomia crispa (Kunth) C. Baker ex. Becc. - Cuba
- Acrocomia emensis (Toledo) Lorenzi - Brazil
- Acrocomia glaucescens Lorenzi - Brazil
- Acrocomia hassleri (Barb.Rodr.) W.J.Hahn - Mato Grosso do Sul, Paraguay
- Acrocomia intumescens Drude - Brazil
- Acrocomia media O.F.Cook - Puerto Rico, Virgin Islands
- Acrocomia mexicana Karw. ex Mart. - Yucatán, Mexico
- Acrocomia totai Mart. - Bolivia, Paraguay, northern Argentina, southern Brazil
