= Akpeteshie =

National spirit of Ghana

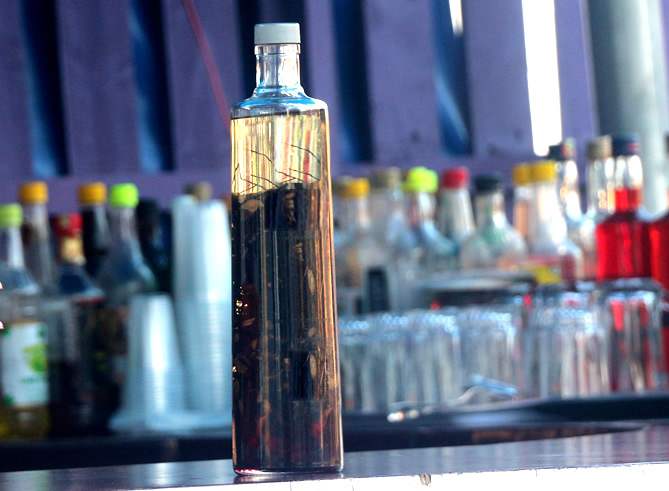
- Akpeteshie infused with herbs
- Type: Liquor
- Origin: Ghana
- Alcohol by volume: 30–60%
- Proof (US): 60°–120°
- Colour: clear
- Ingredients: Palm wine
- Related products: Ogogoro

Akpeteshie is a liquor produced by distilling palm wine or sugar cane, primarily in the region of Western Africa. It is the national spirit of Ghana. In Nigeria it is known as Ògógóró (Ogog'), an Urhobo word, usually distilled locally from fermented Raffia palm tree juice, where it is known as the country's homebrew. Today, there is a misconception that Ogogoro can be pure ethanol, but traditionally, it had to come from the palm tree and then be distilled from this source.

It is popular throughout West Africa, and goes by many names including apio, ogoglo, ogogoro (Ogog'), VC10, Kill Me Quick, Efie Nipa, Kele, Kumepreko, Anferewoase, Apiatiti, Home Boy, Nana Drobo, One Touch among others. It is also known as sapele water, kparaga, kai-kai, Sun gbalaja, egun inu igo meaning The Masquerade in the Bottle, push-me-push-you, and/or crim-kena, sonsé ("do you do it?" in Yoruba language). In the Igbo language it is known as Akpuru achia. Other Nigerian epithets include: Udi Ogagan, Agbagba Urhobo, as well OHMS (Our Home Made Stuff), Iced Water, Push Me, I Push You and Craze man in the bottle. Ghanaian moonshine is referred to as akpeteshie.

== History and origins ==
Before the advent of European colonization of what is today Ghana, the Anlo brewed a local spirit also known as "kpótomenui," meaning "something hidden in a coconut mat fence."

With British colonization of what became known as the Gold Coast, such local brewing was outlawed in the early 1930s. According to a 1996 interview with S.S. Dotse about his life under British colonial rule: "Our contention was that the drink the white man brought is the same as ours. The white men's contention was that ours was too strong...Before the white men came we were using akpeteshie. But when they came they banned it, probably because they wanted to make sales on their own liquor. And so we were calling it kpótomenui. When you had a visitor whom you knew very well, then you ordered that kpótomenui be brought. This is akpeteshie, but it was never referred to by name."

The name "akpeteshie" was given to the drink with its prohibition: the word comes from the Ga language (ape te shie, the act of hiding) spoken in greater Accra and means they are hiding, referring to the secretive way in which non-European inhabitants were forced to consume the beverage. Despite being outlawed, illicit spirits remained commonplace, with reports that even schoolboys were able to easily obtain akpeteshie through the 1930s. Demand for akpeteshie and the profits to be made from its sale was enough to encourage the spread of sugar cane cultivation in the Anlo region of Ghana.

Distillation was legalized with decolonization and Ghanaian independence. The first factory was established in the Volta Region, taking advantage of the area's supply of sugar cane plantations.

== Preparation ==
Ogogoro is distilled from the juice of Raffia palm trees. An incision is made in the trunk and a gourd placed outside it for collection, which is collected a day or two later. After extraction, the sap is boiled to form steam, which subsequently condenses and is collected for consumption.

== Brewing ==
Brewing of Akpeteshie.

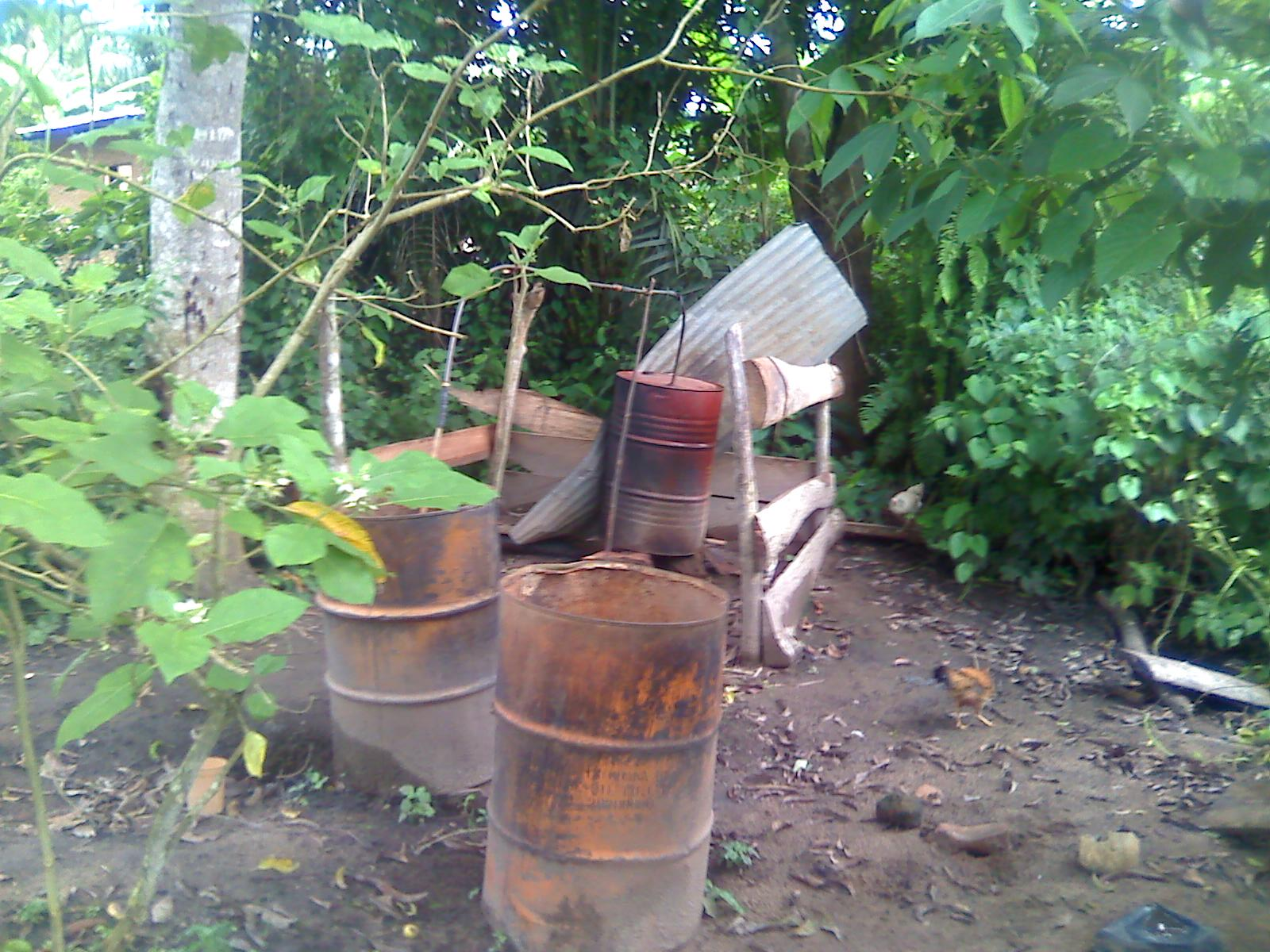
Akpeteshie local distillation process

Akpeteshie is distilled from palm wine or sugarcane juice. This sweetened liquid or wine is first fermented in a large barrels, sometimes with the help of yeast. After this first stage of fermentation, fires are built under the barrels in order to bring the liquid to a boil and pass the resulting vapor through a copper pipe within cooling barrels, where it condenses and drips into sieved jars. The boiled juice then undergoes a distillation. The resulting spirit is between 40 and 50% alcohol by volume.

== Packaging and consumption ==
Akpeteshie is not professionally bottled or sealed, but instead poured into unlabeled used bottles. The spirit can be bought wholesale from a brewer or by the glass at boutiques and bars. Although not professionally advertised, the drink is very popular. This is partially due to its price, which is lower than that of other professionally bottled or imported drinks. Its relative cheapness makes it a drink associated more with the poor, but even those who can afford better quality are said to consume the spirit in secret.

The potency of the liquor heavily affects the bodily senses, providing a feeling likened to that of a knockout punch. Practiced drinkers can be seen acknowledging receipt by blowing out air or pounding their chest.

== Social significance ==
As drink and commodity, respectively, ogogoro carries substantial cultural and economic significance within Nigeria. It is an essential part of numerous religious and social ceremonies; Burutu (Ijaw) priests pour it onto the ground as offerings to contact their gods, while fathers of Nigerian brides use it as a libation by which they provide their official blessing to a wedding.

The economic facets of ogogoro have been equally salient throughout recent Nigerian history. Many poor Nigerian families homebrew the drink as a means of economic subsistence, many of whom sell shots of it on city street corners. The criminalization of ogogoro which occurred under the colonial regime is also believed to have been largely economic; while the public justifications for the law regarded public health concerns regarding alcohol, it has been argued that colonial officials were also seeking to suppress local economic activity which might draw money or labor away from the colonial system.
