= Acrocomia hassleri =

Scientific classification
- Kingdom: Plantae
- Clade: Tracheophytes
- Clade: Angiosperms
- Clade: Monocots
- Clade: Commelinids
- Order: Arecales
- Family: Arecaceae
- Genus: Acrocomia
- Species: A. hassleri

Binomial name
- Acrocomia hassleri (Barb.Rodr.) W.J.Hahn

Synonyms
- Acanthococos hassleri Barb.Rodr. Acanthococos sericea Burret; Acanthococos emensis Toledo; Acanthococos emensis var. pubifolia Toledo

Species of palm

Acrocomia hassleri is a species of palm which is native to southern Brazil (State of Mato Grosso do Sul) and Paraguay.
