= Coyol wine =

Alcoholic beverage made from coyol palm sap

Coyol wine, or chicha de coyol is a fermented alcoholic beverage made from the sap of coyol palms. It originates from Nicoya, Costa Rica but extended to southern Mexico and certain regions of Central America like Nicaragua and Honduras. Juticalpa in Honduras, the rest of Costa Rica, and Río San Juan Department and Chontales Department, Nicaragua are all known for their traditions of coyol wine.

In order to produce the wine, the trees are cut down and drained of their sap, which is left to ferment in the sun. The result is a cloudy, pale yellow, moderately alcoholic beverage. Coyol wine is most commonly produced and sold by private vendors, often seen selling the drink on the side of country roads and at small kiosks in used plastic bottles that originally contained water, soft drinks, or other similar beverages.

Coyol can also be drunk directly from the hole where it collects in the palm trunk, using a straw or a piece of bamboo.

The wine is purportedly unique in that it causes inebriation not primarily by its alcohol content, but through enzymatic action triggered when one drinks it and then receives significant sun exposure. It is popularly claimed that one can become inebriated at night, regain sobriety by the next day, and then undergo inebriation again in the morning without consuming any more, merely by being exposed to the sun again.
