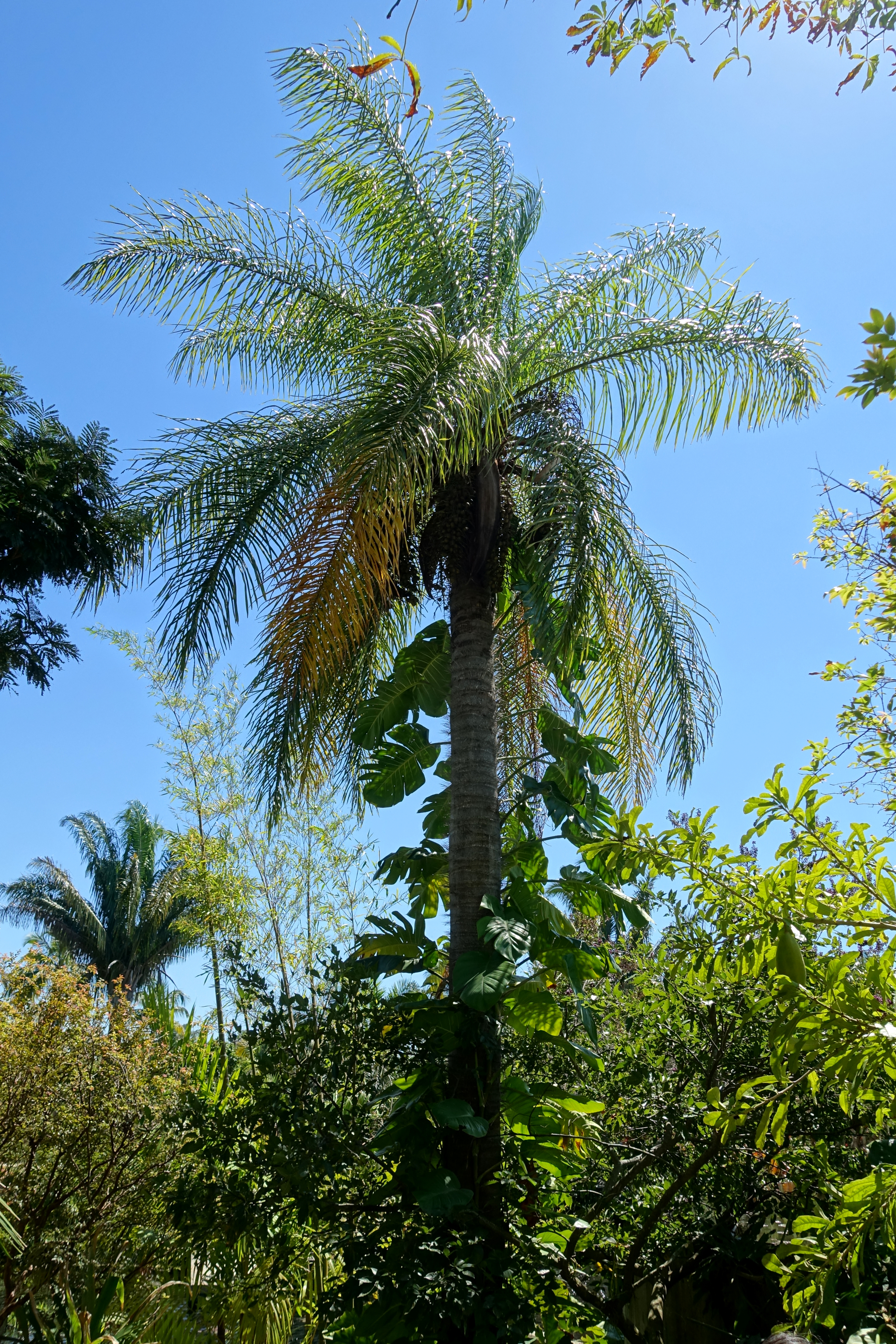

Conservation status
- Least Concern (IUCN 3.1)

Scientific classification
- Kingdom: Plantae
- Clade: Tracheophytes
- Clade: Angiosperms
- Clade: Monocots
- Clade: Commelinids
- Order: Arecales
- Family: Arecaceae
- Genus: Acrocomia
- Species: A. aculeata

Binomial name
- Acrocomia aculeata (Jacq.) Lodd. ex Mart.

= Acrocomia aculeata =

Species of flowering plant

Acrocomia aculeata is a species of palm native to the Neotropics.

== Common names ==
Common names include grugru palm, gloo gloo, corojo, macaúba palm, coyol palm, and macaw palm; synonyms include A. lasiospatha, A. sclerocarpa, and A. vinifera.

== Description ==
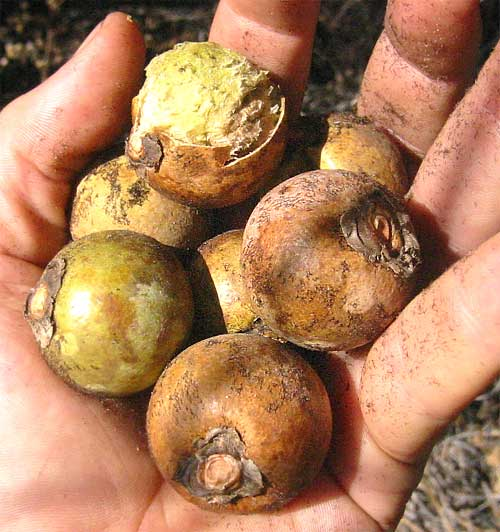
Fruit of Acrocomia aculeata

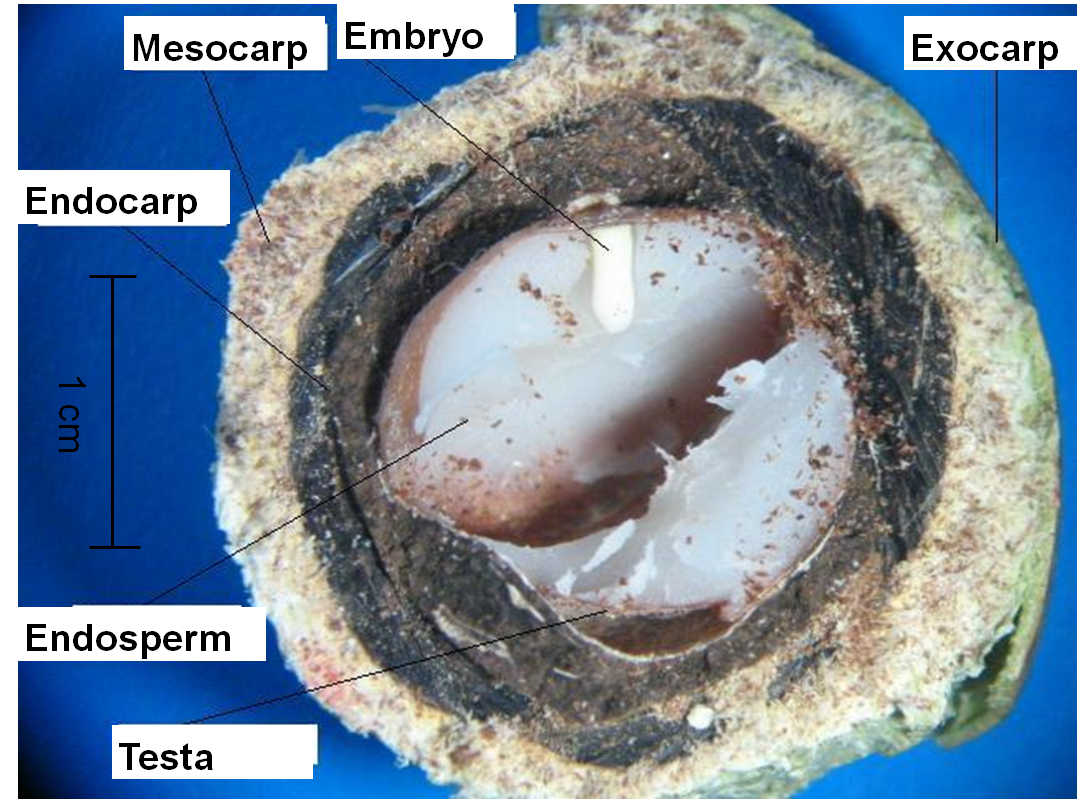
Composition of fruit by layers

Acrocomia aculeata grows up to 15–20 m (50–70 ft) tall, with a trunk up to 50 cm (20 in) in diameter, characterized by numerous slender, black, viciously sharp 10 cm (4 in) long spines jutting out from the trunk. This palm tree usually grows up to 10 – 15 metres tall. The leaves are pinnate, 3–4 m (10–13 ft) long, with numerous slender, 50–100 cm (1 ft 8 in – 3 ft 3 in) long leaflets. Petioles of the leaves are also covered with spines. The flowers are small, produced on a large branched inflorescence 1.5 m (5 ft) long. The fruit is a yellowish-green drupe 2.5–5 cm (1–2 in) in diameter. The inner fruit shell, also called endocarp, is very tough to break and contains usually one single, dark brown, nut-like seed 1–2 cm (1/2–3/4 in) in diameter. The inside of the seed, also called endosperm, is a dry white filling that has a vaguely sweet taste like coconut when eaten. The fruit turns yellow when ripe and has a hard outer shell. The pulp is slightly sweet, slimy and sticky.

== Distribution and habitat ==
The species is found from southern Mexico and the Caribbean to Brazil, where it inhabits diverse environments such as the Cerrado savanna and the Mata Atlântica rainforest. It also extends into Paraguay and northern Argentina, thriving in environments ranging from grasslands to subtropical forests.

== Ecology ==
The tree was noted by the English naturalist Henry Walter Bates in his 1863 book The Naturalist on the River Amazons, where he wrote that

[The hyacinth macaw] flies in pairs, and feeds on the hard nuts of several palms, but especially of the Mucuja (Acrocomia lasiospatha). These nuts, which are so hard as to be difficult to break with a heavy hammer, are crushed to a pulp by the powerful beak of this macaw.

— Bates

== Soil and climate requirements ==
The macauba palm grows abundantly in both degraded and pristine areas and it adapts well to diverse ecosystems. While it generally thrives better in fertile, clay-rich soils and native forest regions, it can also establish itself in sandy, low-fertility soils. Large populations are often found in grasslands that are degraded and low in nutrients.

The optimal climatic conditions for the macauba palm are characterized by moderate temperatures and ample rainfall. The palm thrives in areas with an average annual temperature between 22-28 °C and requires well-distributed rainfall, ideally between 1'000 to 2'000 mm annually. It can tolerate some variation in climate but grows best in regions with a warm and humid tropical climate.

== Cultivation management ==
Optimal cultivation management for Acrocomia aculeata involves a few key practices to ensure healthy growth and productivity. The palm thrives in soils that are rich in organic matter and nutrients. Therefore, fertilization ensures optimal plant health and productivity. Research suggests approximately 100–150 kg of nitrogen per hectare annually. Fertilizer applications should be split throughout the growing season to match the plant's needs and prevent nutrient loss.

Regarding water management, macauba palms require well-distributed rainfall, but they can tolerate drought periods if provided with supplemental irrigation when needed. For optimal growth, a planting density of 150-200 palms per hectare is recommended to give each plant enough space to grow and bear fruit effectively.

=== Environmental sustainability and soil restoration ===
Beyond its direct uses, macauba cultivation has beneficial environmental impacts, especially in degraded or marginal lands. Its extensive root system enhances soil structure, reduces erosion, and improves water retention, making it suitable for soil restoration projects. Acrocomia aculeata can be integrated into agroforestry systems, where it provides shade and improves biodiversity in plantation ecosystems.

== Harvest ==
The timing of the harvest depends on regional and climatic conditions. In Costa Rica, for instance, the harvest season is typically from July to August. The fruits of the macauba tree ripen at different intervals, with ripe fruits marked by a brown exocarp and a yellowish mesocarp. Once mature, the fruit naturally falls from the tree. The most common harvesting method involves hand-picking the fallen fruits from the ground, as no specialized machinery for macauba harvest is available.

== Yield ==
Acrocomia aculeata is one of the world's highest oil-yielding plants. Each macauba tree produces about four fruit bunches per year, with each bunch containing 300 to 600 drupaceous fruits, each weighing approximately 66 grams. The structure of the macauba fruit includes the epicarp (shell) (23% dry matter), mesocarp (pulp) (46.7% dry matter), endocarp (23.8% dry matter), and endosperm (almond) (6.3% dry matter).

The fruit yield capacity of the macauba ranges from 12.8 to 25 tons per hectare, which translates to oil yields of up to 2 tons per hectare. Notably, there are significant variations in yield and physico-chemical properties of Acrocomia aculeata depending on the region of origin. So far there are no commercial varieties. However, breeding programs are currently underway to exploit the yield potential and standardize the harvest volumes.

== Pests and diseases ==
Although the nutritious mesocarp is well protected by the hard endocarp against insects an microorganisms, macauba palms face significant threats from various pests and diseases, particularly in commercial plantations.

Pests like beetles, such as the false coconut cockroach (Coraliomela brunnea thoracica), cause damage to the apical leaves, stunting growth and potentially leading to plant death in severe infestations. The coconut bulb weevil (Strategus sp.) damages young plants by feeding on the apical meristem and roots, causing wilting and "dead heart" symptoms. Other beetles, like the coconut weevil (Pachymerus nucleorum), attack the pulp of macauba fruits, making them unfit for commercial use. The fruit weevil (Parisoschoenus obesulus) targets the base of newly formed fruits and flowers, causing premature fruit drop. Termites create galleries in the roots of weakened plants, though no control measures exist for these pests. The pineapple mealybug (Dysmicoccus brevipes) significantly reduces plant height and crown diameter, threatening the survival and productivity of macauba palms.

Diseases affecting macauba include leaf spots caused by pathogens such as Phoma sp. and Colletotrichum sp., which can lead to leaf necrosis and burn. Red ring disease, caused by the nematode Bursaphelenchus cocophilus, causes yellowing and drying of leaflets, eventually killing infected plants. Additionally, the lixa-grande disease complex, associated with Camarotella torrendiela, causes severe leaf burning. The spread of these diseases is not well understood, and there are no registered chemical treatments for either pests or diseases in macauba. Management strategies primarily focus on cultural controls, such as pruning and removal of affected plants, to mitigate these threats.

== Uses ==
Macauba oil and by-products are used in biodiesel production, cosmetics, food, and other bio-based products, contributing to sustainable agriculture and rural economies.

=== Biofuel and biodiesel production ===
The macauba palm is highly valued for its potential as a biodiesel feedstock. Its oil yields are comparable to the highly productive african oil palm (Elaeis guineensis) at 4–6 tons of oil per hectare, and the palm can thrive on marginal soils unsuitable for food crops, which minimizes the risk of land-use conflicts associated with biofuel production. The oil from macauba's pulp and kernel contains a mix of saturated and unsaturated fatty acids, including oleic acid, making it highly suitable for conversion into biodiesel through transesterification. This suitability is enhanced by the relatively low moisture and acidity levels when harvested at the right stage, which improves the efficiency and yield of biodiesel conversion.

=== Cosmetic and pharmaceutical industries ===
The kernel oil of macauba is high in lauric acid (38–45%), a saturated fatty acid with antimicrobial properties, which is prized in the cosmetics and pharmaceutical sectors. Lauric acid's presence makes macauba oil a suitable ingredient in personal care products such as soaps, lotions, and hair care formulations. Unlike many other palm oils, macauba's kernel oil has a stable composition that is resistant to rancidity, enhancing the shelf life of cosmetic products.

=== Food industry ===
Although traditionally less common in the food industry due to its primary non-edible uses, macauba oil's similarity to olive oil in fatty acid composition suggests potential applications as a food-grade vegetable oil. The pulp oil is rich in monounsaturated fats, primarily oleic acid, which contributes to heart health and reduces LDL cholesterol levels. Studies have highlighted that macauba oil could be a valuable cooking oil or ingredient in food processing, provided it meets food safety standards. The trunk of the palm can also be "milked" to yield a fermented alcoholic beverage known as coyol wine.

=== Utilization of processing residues ===
Residues from macauba oil production have been investigated for energy recovery and the production of adsorbent materials. Studies of the endocarp have examined its conversion by pyrolysis into biochar and its use in producing activated carbon and chemically modified adsorbents. These materials have been tested for the removal of contaminants from aqueous solutions, including lead and uranium. Pulp and kernel press cakes have also been investigated as adsorbents, extending their potential applications beyond animal feed. The fruit husk has been studied as a feedstock for fuel briquettes and for biogas production through anaerobic digestion. Research on husk pretreatment has examined ways to improve its biodegradability and methane production. Other investigated applications include the use of treated husk particles as a support for lipase immobilization and of press cakes as substrates for enzyme production. A 2026 review of macauba biomass research identified the integration of these processes into biorefineries as a research gap, noting that most studies examined individual conversion pathways separately. It also found that adsorption applications were predominantly studied at laboratory scale, while anaerobic digestion and second-generation ethanol production remained less explored. Variability in biomass composition and the shortage of life-cycle assessments covering cultivation, oil extraction and residue conversion were identified as limitations to evaluating integrated production systems.
