= Calle =

Calle may refer to:

== Places ==
- Calle-Calle River, southern Chile

== Film and television ==
- Calle 7, a Chilean TV Show
- Calle 54 (2000), a documentary film

=== Music ===
- Calle 13 (band), a Puerto Rican hip hop band
- "Calle Ocho" (2009), a hip hop song by Pitbull

== Other uses ==
- Calle (name)
- Calle (brand) A SLC-based street soccer brand helping to build street soccer courts across America.
- Calle (Venice), a typical Venetian street, located between two continuous rows of buildings

== See also ==
- Cable (disambiguation)
- Cale (disambiguation)
- Call (disambiguation)
- Calla (disambiguation)
- Caller (disambiguation)
- Callie (disambiguation)
- Cally (disambiguation)
- Calpe (disambiguation)
- Celle (disambiguation)
