= Kalas =

Kalas may refer to:

== Places ==
- Kalas, Karnataka, a village in India
- Kalas, Parner, a village in Maharashtra, India
- Madu Kalas, a village in Pakistan
- Uttar Kalas, a town in West Bengal, India
- Kalas, Iran, a village in East Azerbaijan Province, Iran
- Galați (Turkish: Kalas), Romania

== Other uses ==
- Kalas (surname)
- Kalas (band) (formerly Scum Angel), American heavy metal band led by Matt Pike
- Kalas, protagonist of the video game Baten Kaitos: Eternal Wings and the Lost Ocean

== See also ==
- 120349 Kalas, a main-belt minor planet
- Mount Kailash, a peak in the Kailas Range (Gangdisê Mountains), which are part of the Transhimalaya in Tibet
- Kalasha, a metal pot used in Hindu rites
- Kallas, an Estonian surname
- Kala (disambiguation)
- Kalach (disambiguation)
- Kalash (disambiguation)
- Kalla (disambiguation)
- Callas (disambiguation)
