= Calas =

Calas may refer to:

- Calas (food), a popular breakfast food in New Orleans
- Calas (general), a general and satrap of Alexander the Great
- Calas (surname)
- CALAS, Canadian Association for Laboratory Animal Science

== See also ==
- Callas (disambiguation)
- Kalas (disambiguation)
