= Medvezhy =

Medvezhiy, medvezhy, or medvezhyi are transliterations of медве́жьи, the Russian word for bear, and can refer to:

- Medvezhiy Glacier
- Medvezhy Island, in the Sea of Okhotsk
- Medvezhy Ruchey mine
- Medvezhy Vzvoz, a village
- Medvezhyi Islands, in the East Siberian Sea

== See also ==
- Medvezhye (disambiguation)
