= Nikolenkov =

Nikolenkov Николенков
- Khutor
- Location within Voronezh Oblast Location within Russia
- Coordinates: 50°27′N 40°58′E
- Country: Russia
- Region: Voronezh Oblast
- District: Kalacheyevsky District
- Time zone: UTC+3:00

Nikolenkov (Russian: Николенков) is a rural locality (a khutor) in Kalach, Kalacheyevsky District, Voronezh Oblast, Russia. The population was 50 as of 2010. There are 2 streets.

== Geography ==
Nikolenkov is located 6 km north of Kalach (the district's administrative centre) by road. Prishib is the nearest rural locality.
