= Novaya Kriusha =

Novaya Kriusha Новая Криуша
- Selo
- Location within Voronezh Oblast Location within Russia
- Coordinates: 50°15′N 41°17′E
- Country: Russia
- Region: Voronezh Oblast
- District: Kalacheyevsky District
- Time zone: UTC+3:00

Novaya Kriusha (Russian: Новая Криуша) is a rural locality (a selo) and the administrative center of Novokriushanskoye Rural Settlement, Kalacheyevsky District, Voronezh Oblast, Russia. The population was 1,941 as of 2010. There are 17 streets.

== Geography ==
Novaya Kriusha is located 31 km southeast of Kalach (the district's administrative centre) by road. Skripnikovo is the nearest rural locality.
