= Kalpe =

Kalpe (Ancient Greek: Κάλπη) may refer to:

- Kalpe, the ancient name for Gibraltar
- Kalpe (Bithynia), a city of ancient Bithynia in Asia Minor
- Kalpe (river), a river of ancient Bithynia in Asia Minor
