= Novomelovatka =

Novomelovatka Новомеловатка
- Selo
- Location within Voronezh Oblast Location within Russia
- Coordinates: 50°26′N 40°46′E
- Country: Russia
- Region: Voronezh Oblast
- District: Kalacheyevsky District
- Time zone: UTC+3:00

Novomelovatka (Russian: Новомеловатка) is a rural locality (a selo) and the administrative center of Melovatskoye Rural Settlement, Kalacheyevsky District, Voronezh Oblast, Russia. In ХІХ century the village was part of Novomelovatskaya volost, Bogucharsky Uyezd, Voronezh Governorate. The population was 1,950 as of 2010. There are 15 streets.

== Geography ==
Novomelovatka is located 22 km west of Kalach (the district's administrative centre) by road. Morozov is the nearest rural locality.
