= Sovetskoye, Voronezh Oblast =

Sovetskoye Советское
- Selo
- Location within Voronezh Oblast Location within Russia
- Coordinates: 50°21′N 41°24′E
- Country: Russia
- Region: Voronezh Oblast
- District: Kalacheyevsky District
- Time zone: UTC+3:00

Sovetskoye (Russian: Советское) is a rural locality (a selo) and the administrative center of Sovetskoye Rural Settlement, Kalacheyevsky District, Voronezh Oblast, Russia. The population was 432 as of 2010. There are 5 streets.

== Geography ==
Sovetskoye is located 37 km southeast of Kalach (the district's administrative centre) by road. Kolos is the nearest rural locality.
