= Manino, Voronezh Oblast =

Manino Манино
- Selo
- Location within Voronezh Oblast Location within Russia
- Coordinates: 50°29′N 41°23′E
- Country: Russia
- Region: Voronezh Oblast
- District: Kalacheyevsky District
- Time zone: UTC+3:00

Manino (Russian: Манино) is a rural locality (a selo) and the administrative center of Maninskoye Rural Settlement, Kalacheyevsky District, Voronezh Oblast, Russia. The population was 2,409 as of 2010. There are 32 streets.

== Geography ==
Manino is located 31 km northeast of Kalach (the district's administrative centre) by road. Krasnopolye is the nearest rural locality.
