= Kalacheyevsky =

Kalacheyevsky (masculine), Kalacheyevskaya (feminine), or Kalacheyevskoye (neuter) may refer to:

- Kalacheyevsky District, Voronezh Oblast, Russia
- Kalacheyevsky (rural locality), Voronezh Oblast, Russia

== See also ==
- Kalachevsky (disambiguation)
- Kalach (disambiguation)
