= Calla (disambiguation) =

Calla is a genus of flowering plants in the family Araceae.

Calla may also refer to:

- Calla (name)
- Calla (band), a rock band from Texas via Brooklyn
  - Calla (album)
- Calla, Ohio, a community in the United States
- Calla Bryn Sturgis, fictional town in The Dark Tower V, Wolves of the Calla
- Calla lily, the common name for the genus Zantedeschia of flowering plants in the family Araceae
- Calla Records, a defunct independent soul music label
- Common acute lymphoblastic leukemia antigen, also known as CD10 or Neprilysin
- Calla (film), a 1999 South Korean film by Song Hae-sung
- The Cognitive Academic Language Learning Approach (CALLA), an ESL teaching approach developed in the 1980s

== See also ==
- CALA (disambiguation)
- Call (disambiguation)
- Callan (disambiguation)
- Callao (disambiguation)
- Callas (disambiguation)
- Calle (disambiguation)
- Cally (disambiguation)
- Carla (disambiguation)
- Cella (disambiguation)
- Kalla (disambiguation)
