= Medvezhye =

Medvezhye may refer to:

- Medvezhye (Vologda Oblast), a village in Russia
- Medvezhye, Kalacheyevsky District, Voronezh Oblast, a village in Russia
- Medvezhye gas field, Yamalo-Nenets Autonomous Okrug, Russia
- Sankovo-Medvezhye, a Russian exclave in Belarus
- Medvezhye Lake, a body of water in the Dusse-Alin
- Medvezhye (Chukotka Autonomous Okrug), a body of water in Providensky District, Russia
- Medvezhye (Kurgan Oblast), a lake in Petukhovsky District, Kurgan Oblast, Russia

== See also ==
- Medvezhy (disambiguation)
