= Calpe (disambiguation) =

Calpe is the Spanish name for Calp, a coastal town in Valencia, Spain. It may also refer to:

- Calpe (monolith), also known as the Rock of Gibraltar or Mons Calpe, a monolithic limestone promontory located in Gibraltar. It was one of the Pillars of Hercules.
- Gibraltar: Calpe is an ancient name for Gibraltar, taken from the promontory. It still appears in names, and in the motto "Montis Insignia Calpe", traditionally placed on the coat of arms of Gibraltar
- Royal Calpe Hunt, formerly Civil Hunt, Civil Calpe Hunt and Calpe Hunt, a fox-hunting club based in Gibraltar, which existed during the 19th and 20th centuries
- Calpe (Bithynia), a city of ancient Bithynia in Asia Minor
- Calpe (river), a river of ancient Bithynia in Asia Minor
- HMS Calpe, two ships of the Royal Navy
- Espasa Calpe, Spanish book publisher
- Antonio Calpe (1940–2021), Spanish professional footballer
- Calpe Treitschke, 1825, a moth genus synonymous with Calyptra
- Calpe Quoy & Gaimard, 1827, a siphonophore genus now accepted as Abylopsis
