= Grinyov, Kalacheyevsky District, Voronezh Oblast =

Grinyov Гринёв
- Khutor
- Location within Voronezh Oblast Location within Russia
- Coordinates: 50°29′N 40°54′E
- Country: Russia
- Region: Voronezh Oblast
- District: Kalacheyevsky District
- Time zone: UTC+3:00

Grinyov (Russian: Гринёв) is a rural locality (a khutor) in Kalach, Kalacheyevsky District, Voronezh Oblast, Russia. The population was 79 as of 2010. There are four streets.

== Geography ==
Grinyov is located 13 km northwest of Kalach (the district's administrative centre) by road. Garankin is the nearest rural locality.
