= Perevolochnoye =

Perevolochnoye Переволочное
- Selo
- Location within Voronezh Oblast Location within Russia
- Coordinates: 50°18′N 40°42′E
- Country: Russia
- Region: Voronezh Oblast
- District: Kalacheyevsky District
- Time zone: UTC+3:00

Perevolochnoye (Russian: Переволочное) is a rural locality (a selo) in Khreshchatovskoye Rural Settlement, Kalacheyevsky District, Voronezh Oblast, Russia. The population was 464 as of 2010. There are 10 streets.

== Geography ==
Perevolochnoye is located 38 km southwest of Kalach (the district's administrative centre) by road. Khreshchatoye is the nearest rural locality.
