= Garankin =

Garankin Гаранькин
- Khutor
- Location within Voronezh Oblast Location within Russia
- Coordinates: 50°22′N 40°55′E
- Country: Russia
- Region: Voronezh Oblast
- District: Kalacheyevsky District
- Time zone: UTC+3:00

Garankin (Russian: Гаранькин) is a rural locality (a khutor) in Kalach, Kalacheyevsky District, Voronezh Oblast, Russia. The population was 52 as of 2010. There are 2 streets.

== Geography ==
Garankin is located 11 km northwest of Kalach (the district's administrative centre) by road. Grinyov is the nearest rural locality.
