= Zalesny =

Zalesny Залесный
- Khutor
- Location within Voronezh Oblast Location within Russia
- Coordinates: 50°24′N 40°54′E
- Country: Russia
- Region: Voronezh Oblast
- District: Kalacheyevsky District
- Time zone: UTC+3:00

Zalesny (Russian: Залесный) is a rural locality (a khutor) in Kalach, Kalacheyevsky District, Voronezh Oblast, Russia. The population was 310 as of 2010. There are 8 streets.

== Geography ==
Zalesny is located 12 km west of Kalach (the district's administrative centre) by road. Kalach is the nearest rural locality.
