= Kalacha =

Kalacha may refer to:

- Kalacha, Afghanistan, or Qalacha
- Kalacha, East Azerbaijan, Iran, or Qalehcheh
- Kalacha, Markazi, Iran, or Emamzadeh Deh Chal
- Nigatun, Armenia, formerly known as Kalacha

== See also ==
- Kalach (disambiguation)
- Qalaça, Azerbaijan
- Qal'acha, Tajikistan
- Kalachah, Iran
