= Kalachevsky =

Kalachevsky/Kalachyovsky (masculine), Kalachevskaya/Kalachyovskaya (feminine), or Kalachevskoye/Kalachyovskoye (neuter) may refer to:

- Kalachyovsky District, a district of Volgograd Oblast, Russia
- Kalachevskoye Urban Settlement, incorporating Kalach-na-Donu, Kalachyovsky District, Volgograd Oblast, Russia
- Kalachevsky (rural locality), Volgograd Oblast, Russia

== See also ==
- Kalacheyevsky (disambiguation)
- Kalach (disambiguation)
