= Kalash =

Kalash or Kalasha may refer to:

== Peoples and languages ==
- Kalash people, or Kalasha, an ethnic group of Chitral, Pakistan
- Kalasha language, also known as Kalasha-mun, a language of Chitral, Pakistan
- Kalasha-ala, a language of Nuristan, Afghanistan

== People with the name ==
- Kavi Kalash, a Royal Poet and Confidant of Chhatrapati Sambhaji Maharaj
- Kalash (rapper) (Kévin Valleray, born 1988), a French rapper
- Kalash Criminel (Amira Kiziamina, born 1995), a French rapper from the Democratic Republic of Congo
- Kalash l'Afro (born 1979), a French rapper of Tunisian origin

== Places ==
- Kalasha Valleys, in Chitral District, Pakistan
- Kalash, Iran, a village in East Azerbaijan Province, Iran
- Kalash-e Bozorg, a village in Ardabil Province, Iran

== Other uses ==
- Kalasha, or kalash, a pot used in Hindu rituals
- Kalasha (finial), the finial of Hindu temples
- Kalash (footwear)
- Kalash (TV series), an Indian soap opera 2001–2003
  - Kalash - Ek Vishwaas, an Indian soap opera 2015–2017
- Kalashnikov rifle, colloquially known as Kalash

== See also ==
- Kalas (disambiguation)
- Kailash (disambiguation)
- Kalach (disambiguation)
- Kalašma Bronze Age polity in Anatolia
- Kalašma language
- Kalashnikov (disambiguation)
