= Kalacheyevsky (rural locality) =

Kalacheyevsky Калачеевский
- Settlement
- Location within Voronezh Oblast Location within Russia
- Coordinates: 50°20′N 41°09′E
- Country: Russia
- Region: Voronezh Oblast
- District: Kalacheyevsky District
- Time zone: UTC+3:00

Kalacheyevsky (Russian: Калачеевский) is a rural locality (a settlement) and the administrative center of Kalacheyevskoye Rural Settlement, Kalacheyevsky District, Voronezh Oblast, Russia. The population was 1,082 as of 2010. There are 15 streets.

== Geography ==
Kalacheyevsky is located 16 km southeast of Kalach (the district's administrative centre) by road. Kolos is the nearest rural locality.
