= Callie =

Callie (also spelled Kallie), is a given name, nickname and surname. It is an English feminine given name that is often used as a form of Carrie and sometimes as a diminutive of Caroline. It primarily means “beauty” or “most beautiful”—it derives from the Greek word kallos, meaning “beauty” or from names like Callista (“most beautiful”) and Calliope (“beautiful voice” the Greek muse of epic poetry).

Notable people who are known by this name include the following:

== People ==
=== Given name ===
- Callie-Ann Warrington (born 2000), British Paralympic swimmer
- Callie Brownson (born 1989), American football player and coach
- Callie Crossley, American broadcast journalist
- Callie duPerier (born 1993), American barrel racer
- Callie V. Granade (born 1950), American judge
- Callie Hart (born 1983), British romance and fantasy author
- Callie Hernandez (born 1988), American actress
- Callie House (1861–1928), African American political activist
- Callie Leach French (1861–1935), American steamboat captain and pilot
- Callie Rennison, Criminologist
- Callie Schuttera, American actor
- Callie Shanahan (born 2003), American ice hockey player
- Callie Visagie (born 1988), South African rugby union player

=== Nickname ===
- Callie Kazumi, British novelist
- Callie Khouri (born 1957), screenwriter and director
- Callie Thorne (born 1969), American actress

=== Surname ===
- Ashley Callie (1976–2008), South African actress
- Dayton Callie (born 1946), Scottish-born American actor

== Fictional characters ==
- Callie Betto (Dryad), a mutant character in Marvel Comics
- Callie Briggs, on the TV series SWAT Kats: The Radical Squadron
- Callie Cadogan, on the TV series The 100
- Callie Adams Foster, a main character in the American TV series The Fosters.
- Callie Howard, Judy Howard's daughter in the movie Bad Boys: Ride or Die.
- Callie Maggotbone, on the TV series Ugly Americans
- Callie McPherson, in the novel Cut
- Callie Rogers, on the American soap opera The Young and the Restless (1998–2000)
- Callie Sadecki, Shauna and Jeff's daughter in the TV show Yellowjackets.
- Callie Shaw, in The Hardy Boys series
- Calliope Callie Torres, on the TV series Grey's Anatomy
- Sheriff Callie, title character of the Disney Junior TV series Sheriff Callie's Wild West
- Callie, cousin of Marie and one of the Squid Sisters from Splatoon (2015) and its sequels Splatoon 2 (2017) and Splatoon 3 (2022).

== See also ==
- Callie Furnace, a historic iron furnace in Virginia
- René Caillié (1799–1838), French explorer
- Calley, a surname
- "Callie" is the common shortening of an Origins Award
- Carlie
