= Medvezhye, Kalacheyevsky District, Voronezh Oblast =

Medvezhye Медвежье
- Selo
- Location within Voronezh Oblast Location within Russia
- Coordinates: 50°33′N 40°41′E
- Country: Russia
- Region: Voronezh Oblast
- District: Kalacheyevsky District
- Time zone: UTC+3:00

Medvezhye (Russian: Медвежье) is a rural locality (a selo) and the administrative center of Rossypnyanskoye Rural Settlement, Kalacheyevsky District, Voronezh Oblast, Russia. The population was 381 as of 2010. There are 9 streets.

== Geography ==
Medvezhye is located 41 km northwest of Kalach (the district's administrative centre) by road. Rossypnoye is the nearest rural locality.
