= Bear Glacier =

Bear Glacier may refer to one of several glaciers:

- Bear Glacier Provincial Park in British Columbia, Canada
- Bear Glacier within Kenai Fjords National Park in Alaska, United States
- Medvezhiy Glacier ("Bear Glacier" in Russian) in Tajikistan

== See also ==
- Glacier bear
