= Cala =

Cala (or CALA) may refer to:

== Geography ==
- Cala, Eastern Cape, a town in South Africa
- Cala, Huelva, a town and municipality in Huelva province, Spain
- Cala Gonone, a civil parish of Dorgali municipality, Sardinia, Italy

== Acronym ==
- Club Atlético Los Andes, an alternative name for Argentinean sports club Los Andes de Lomas de Zamora
- A business acronym for the Caribbean and Latin America or Central America and Latin America; see List of country groupings
- Chinese American Librarians Association
- Railroad reporting mark for the Carolina Southern Railroad

== People ==
- Cala (footballer, born 1989), Spanish football defender
- Cala (footballer, born 1990), Spanish football midfielder
- Aristóbulo Cala (born 1990), Colombian cyclist
- Ugo Calà (1904–1983), Italian chess player

== Other uses ==
- Cala Foods, a supermarket chain predominantly located in San Francisco
- Cala Homes, a British housebuilding company
- Lamborghini Calà, a concept car
- Cañón 155 mm L 45 CALA 30, an Argentinean long range gun
- Cala Records, a record label founded by Australian conductor Geoffrey Simon

== See also ==
- Calah, Biblical name of the city of Nimdrud
- Calla (disambiguation)
- Kala (disambiguation)
- Calas (disambiguation)
