= Chala (name) =

Chala or Chalá is a surname and a given name. People so named include:

== Surname ==
- Aníbal Chalá (born 1996), Ecuadorian footballer
- Carmen Chalá (born 1976), Ecuadorian judoka and former track and field athlete
- Cléber Chalá (born 1971), Ecuadorian retired footballer
- Diana Chalá (born 1982), Ecuadorian judoka
- Domingo Chalá (born 1945–6), Colombian singer and gravedigger
- Emerson Alejandro Chala (born 1991), Ecuadorian hurdler
- Liliana Chalá (born 1965), Ecuadorian hurdler and sprinter
- Vanessa Chalá (born 1990), Ecuadorian judoka
- Walter Chalá (born 1992), Ecuadorian footballer

== Given name ==
- Chala Beyo (born 1996), Ethiopian long-distance steeplechase runner
- Chala Kelele (born 1966), Ethiopian retired cross-country runner

== See also ==
- Chalas (surname)
- Calas (surname)
