= Horní Beřkovice =

- Municipality
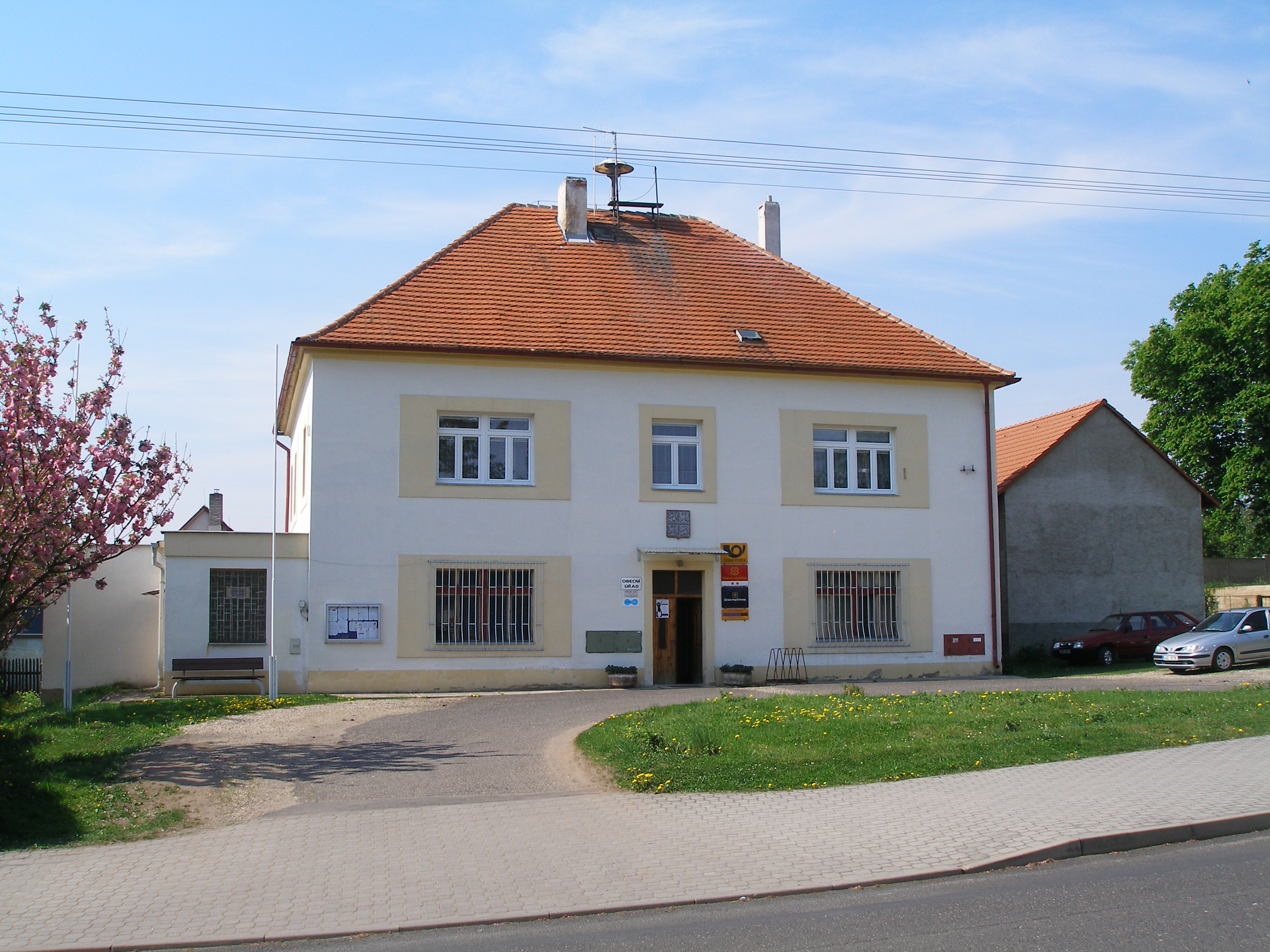
- Municipal office

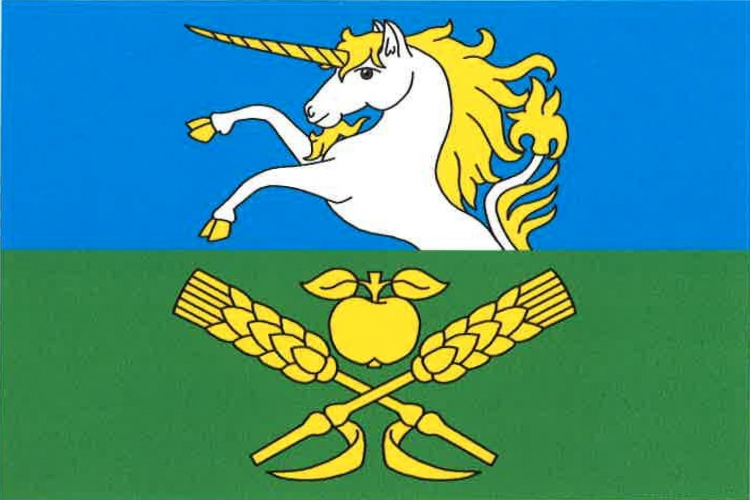
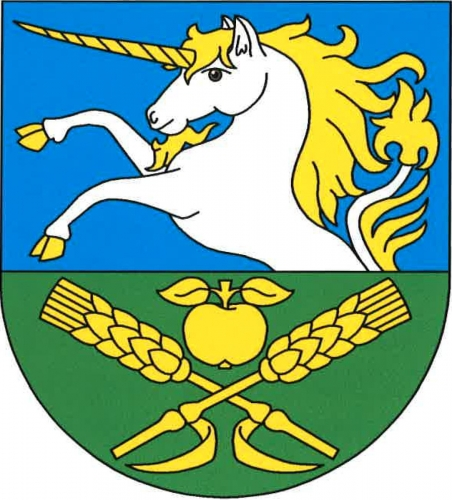
- Flag Coat of arms

- Location in the Czech Republic
- Coordinates: 50°21′32″N 14°20′48″E
- Country: Czech Republic
- Region: Ústí nad Labem
- District: Litoměřice
- First mentioned: 1344

Area
  - Total: 5.10 km^{2} (1.97 sq mi)
- Elevation: 210 m (690 ft)

Population (2026-01-01)
  - Total: 997
  - Density: 195/km^{2} (506/sq mi)
- Time zone: UTC+1 (CET)
  - Summer (DST): UTC+2 (CEST)
- Postal code: 411 85
- Website: www.obechorniberkovice.cz

Horní Beřkovice (German: Ober Berschkowitz) is a municipality and village in Litoměřice District in the Ústí nad Labem Region of the Czech Republic. It has about 1,000 inhabitants.

Horní Beřkovice lies approximately 26 kilometres (16 mi) south-east of Litoměřice, 40 km (25 mi) south-east of Ústí nad Labem, and 31 km (19 mi) north of Prague.

== Demographics ==
Historical population
Year	Pop.	±%
1869	639	—
1880	620	−3.0%
1890	649	+4.7%
1900	1,221	+88.1%
1910	1,509	+23.6%
1921	1,497	−0.8%
1930	2,094	+39.9%
1950	1,559	−25.5%
1961	1,583	+1.5%
1970	1,302	−17.8%
1980	1,036	−20.4%
1991	1,013	−2.2%
2001	948	−6.4%
2011	1,207	+27.3%
2021	1,195	−1.0%
Source: Censuses

== Economy ==
The main employer in Horní Beřkovice is the psychiatric hospital. It has more than 250 employees.

== Notable people ==
- Klementina Kalašová (1850–1889), opera singer
