= Calley =

Calley is the surname of:

== People ==
- Brian Calley (born 1977), American politician, Lieutenant Governor of Michigan
- Henry Calley (1914–1997), English Second World War bomber pilot and politician
- John Calley (1930–2011), American film studio executive and producer
- John Calley (engineer) (1663–1717), metalworker, plumber and glass-blower who helped develop Thomas Newcomen's steam engine
- Roy Calley, English journalist
- Samuel Calley (1821–1883), American politician
- Thomas Calley (politician) (1780–1836), British politician
- Thomas Calley (British Army officer) (1856–1932), British Army major-general and politician
- William Calley (1943–2024), U.S. Army officer involved in the My Lai Massacre

== Fictional characters ==
- Byron Calley, better known as Burner (comics), a Marvel Comics mutant
- Calley, a character from the U.K. television series Chuggington.
- Clifford Calley, on the U.S. television series The West Wing, played by Mark Feuerstein

== See also ==
- Callie, a given name and surname
- Cally, a given name and surname
