= Kalach =

Kalach may refer to:

== Places ==
- Kalach, Iran
- Kalach, Sverdlovsk Oblast, Russia
- Kalach, Liskinsky District, Voronezh Oblast, in the Liski, Voronezh Oblast urban settlement
- Kalach, Kalacheyevsky District, Voronezh Oblast, Russia
- Kalach-na-Donu, formerly Kalach, Kalachyovsky District, Volgograd Oblast, Russia
  - Battle of Kalach, in 1942

== Other uses ==
- Alberto Kalach (born 1960), Mexican architect
- Kalach (food), a traditional Eastern European bread

== See also ==
- Kalacha (disambiguation)
- Kalachevsky (disambiguation)
- Kalacheyevsky (disambiguation)
- Kalash (disambiguation)
