= Halas (surname) =

Halas (feminine: Halasová) is a Czech and Slovak surname. Hałas is a Polish surname derived from a nickname: hałas means 'noise', 'quarrel'. The Polish surname has archaic feminine forms (still used colloquially): Hałasowa (by husband) and Hałasówna (by father). It has forms Halas and Chałas. Notable people with the surname include:

- Agnieszka Hałas (born 1980), Polish fantasy writer
- Adam Halas (born 1998), Slovak swimmer
- Elżbieta Hałas (born 1954), Polish sociologist
- František Halas (1901–1949), Czech poet
- František X. Halas (1937–2023), Czech historian of Christianity, academic and diplomat
- George Halas (1895–1983), American football player and executive
- George Halas, Jr. (1925–1979), American football executive
- John Halas (1912–1995), British animator
- Naomi Halas, American engineer
- Shane Halas (born 1961), Australian rules footballer
- Teresa Hałas (born 1953), Polish politician
- Virginia Halas McCaskey (1923–2025), American football executive
- Walter Halas (1892–1959), American baseball player and coach
