= Cally =

Cally is an English feminine given name of Greek origins as a diminutive form of "Callandra". It is also an English feminine given name that is a form of Carrie and a diminutive form of Caroline.

== People ==
=== Given name ===
- Cally Ideus, American politician
- Cally Kwong (born 1962), Hong Kong singer, actress and businesswoman
- Cally Oldershaw, gemologist and science educator
- Cally Taylor, English author
- Cally-Jo Pothecary (born 1989), British fine artist and tattoo artist

=== Nickname ===
- Cally Beaton (born 1969), nickname of Caroline Beaton, British stand-up comedian, writer, executive coach and former TV executive
- Cally Monrad (1879–1950), nickname of Ragnhild Caroline Monrad, Norwegian singer, actress and poet
- Cally Gault (1927–2019), nickname of Calhoun Folk Gault, American gridiron football coach and college athletics administrator

=== Surname ===
- Pierre Cally (1630–1709), French Catholic Cartesian philosopher and theologian

=== Pseudonym ===
- Junior Cally (born 1991), pseudonym of Antonio Signore, Italian rapper

== Fictional characters ==
- Cally (Blake's 7), from the British science fiction television series Blake's 7
- Cally Harper Ewing, from the television series Dallas
- Cally Stone, a main character in the television series Dark Oracle

== See also ==
- The "Cally", a local colloquial name for the Caledonian Road, London, UK
- Callie (disambiguation)
- Calley, a surname
- Cally (ship, 1944), see Boats of the Mackenzie River watershed
- Caloy
