= Dubuque Freight House =

- U.S. National Register of Historic Places
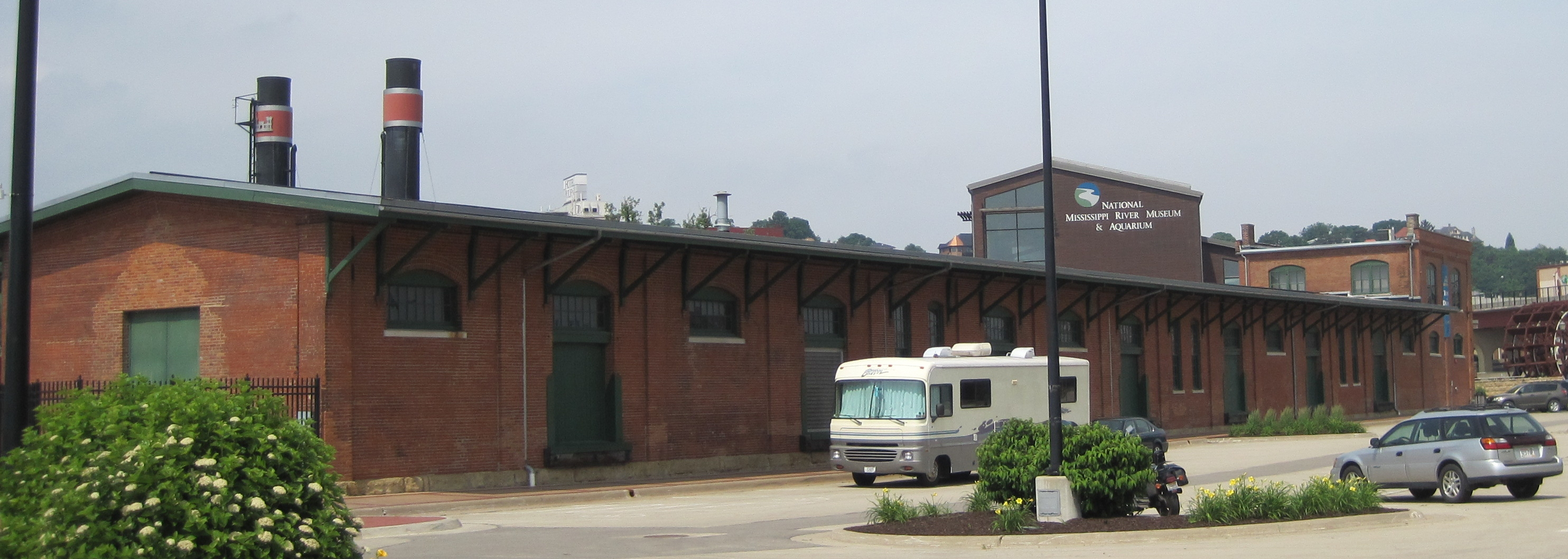

- Location within Iowa Location within the United States
- Location: E. 3rd St. Extension; Dubuque, Iowa
- Coordinates: 42°29′47.7″N 90°39′38.8″W
- Area: less than one acre
- Built: 1901
- Architect: Chicago, Burlington & Northern RR
- NRHP reference No.: 79003693
- Added to NRHP: October 11, 1979

The Dubuque Freight House is a historic building located in Dubuque, Iowa, United States. Built by the Chicago, Burlington and Northern Railroad (CB&N) in 1901, this was the third and last freight house built by a railroad in the Ice Harbor area. The other two facilities were built by the Illinois Central Railroad (1872) and the Chicago, Milwaukee and St. Paul Railroad (1874). These other two railroads were older, larger, and monopolized the bridge and tunnel that crossed the Mississippi River. The CB&N was fortunate that their freight house was located along the water's edge in that the river boats could tie up next to the building and load and unload cargo, and the railroad put box cars on ferries that docked in the Ice Harbor. The Dubuque Boat and Boiler Works were headquartered on the west end of the facility for 20 years beginning in 1952. Founded in 1852 as the Iowa Iron Works, they provided engines, boilers and other equipment for river boats, and water craft for the United States Navy, United States Coast Guard, and the United States Army Corps of Engineers. The building was listed on the National Register of Historic Places in 1979. It is now a part of the National Mississippi River Museum & Aquarium.
