= Kallas =

Family name

Kallas is a common Estonian surname (meaning shore), and may refer to:

- Aino Kallas (1878–1956), Finnish-Estonian writer
- Ene Kallas (born 1973), Estonian poet and journalist
- Kaja Kallas (born 1977), Estonian politician, High Representative of the European Union since 2024
- Karol Kallas (born 1972), Estonian art critic and journalist (:et)
- Kristina Kallas (born 1976), Estonian politician
- Madis Kallas (born 1981), Estonian decathlete
- Olimar Kallas (1929–2006), Estonian caricaturist and graphical artist
- Oskar Kallas (1868–1946), Estonian diplomat and linguist
- Raivo Kallas (born 1957), Estonian politician
- Rudolf Kallas (1851–1913), Estonian clergyman and pedagogue
- Salim Kallas (1936−2013), Syrian actor and politician
- Siim Kallas (1948–2026), Estonian politician
- Teet Kallas (born 1943), Estonian writer

Greek:

- Kallas, ancient Greek general of the Philip II of Macedon and Alexander the Great

== See also ==
- Kalas (disambiguation)
- Kalla (disambiguation)
- Callas (disambiguation)
