= National Mississippi River Museum & Aquarium =

Museum located in Dubuque, Iowa, US

Coordinates: 42.4968°N 90.6613°W

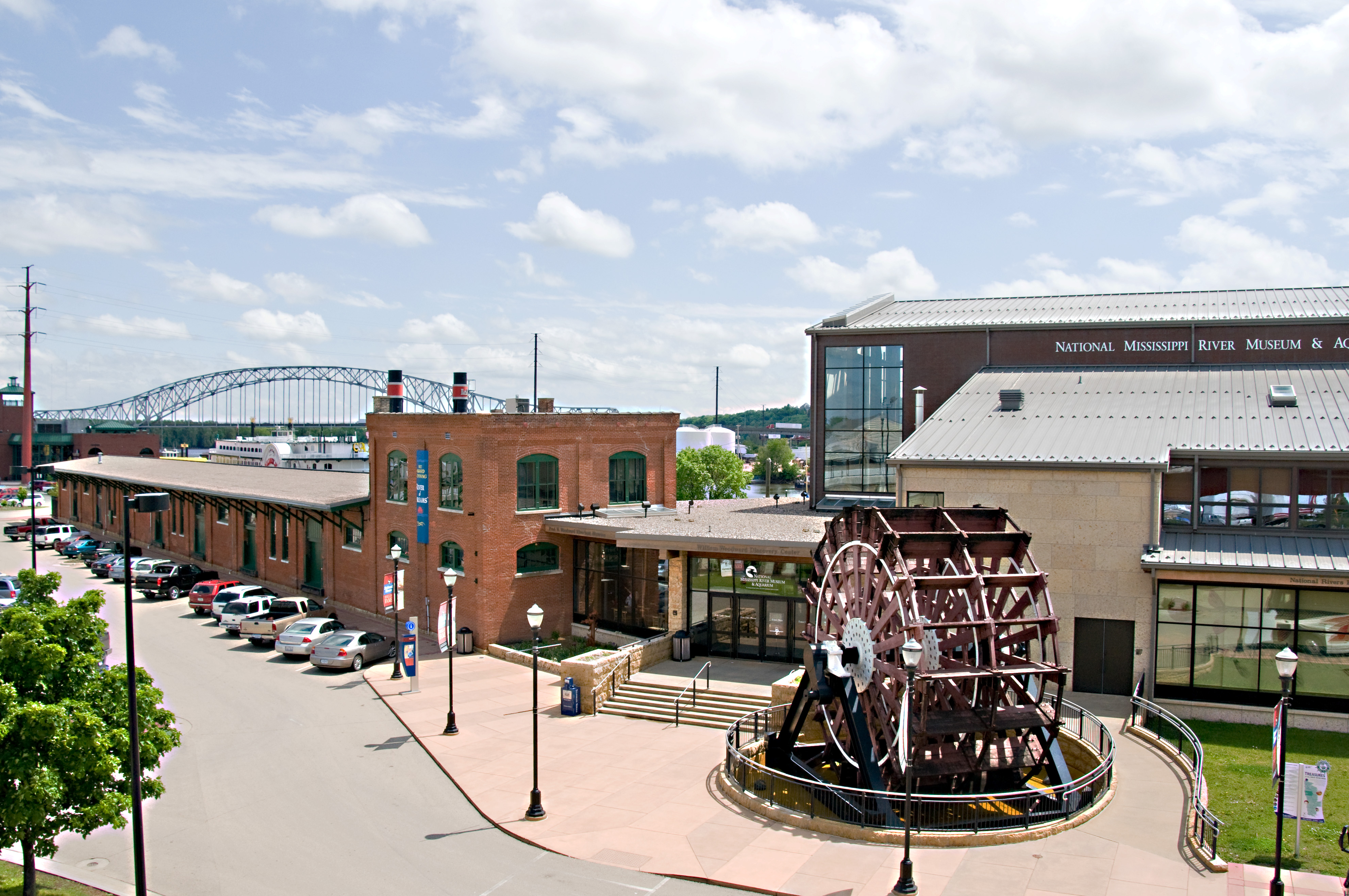
- Museum & Aquarium
- Established: June 28, 2003
- Location: Dubuque, Iowa, US
- Type: Aquarium, History, Natural history, Science
- Visitors: 250,000+ annually
- CEO: Kurt Strand
- Website: www.rivermuseum.org

The National Mississippi River Museum & Aquarium is a museum located in Dubuque, Iowa, US. The museum is a property of the Dubuque County Historical Society, which also operates the Mathias Ham Historic Site. The museum has two buildings on its riverfront campus: the Mississippi River Center and the National River Center. The museum originally opened as the Fred W. Woodward Riverboat Museum on July 18, 1982, before being expanded and re-organized into its current form.

The museum is an affiliate of the Smithsonian Institution, and is accredited by the American Alliance of Museums (AAM) and the Association of Zoos and Aquariums (AZA).

== Overview ==
The National Mississippi River Museum & Aquarium is home to museum exhibits on the culture and history of America's rivers. The campus also includes over a dozen aquariums featuring wildlife representative of that found in the Mississippi River and the Gulf of Mexico and other river systems and deltas, including giant catfish, sturgeon, ducks, frogs, turtles, rays, octopodes, river otters, and more. There are also outdoor exhibits, featuring river otters, a marsh, and large artifacts, such as boats, a blacksmith shop, a stream, and raptor aviaries including bald eagle.

=== Permanent exhibits ===
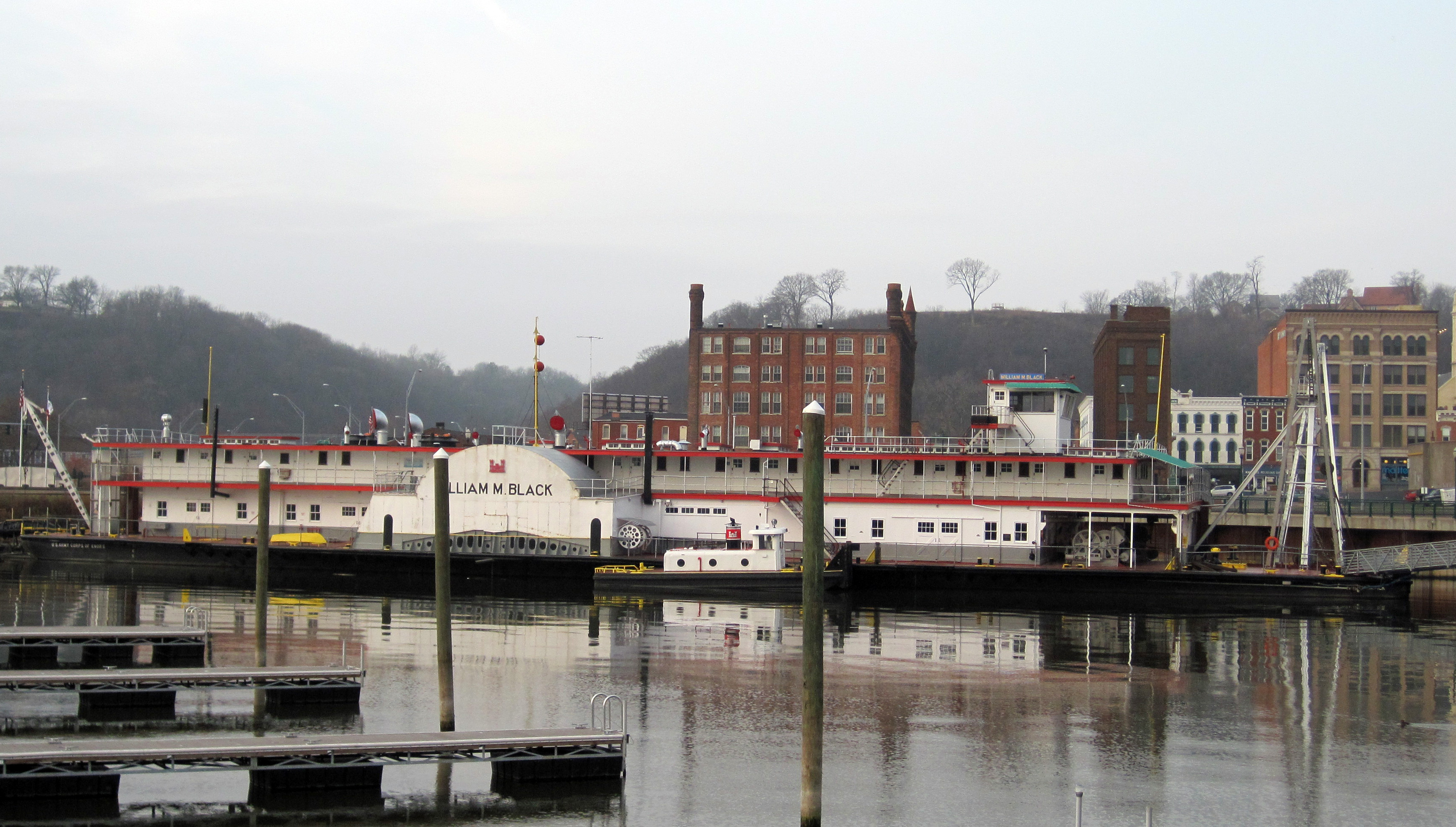
William M. Black.

==== William Woodward Mississippi River Center ====
- Mississippi River Discovery Center
- Carver Wet Lab
- Historic Train Depot
- Fred W. Woodward Riverboat Museum
- Steamboat William M. Black, a National Historic Landmark
- The Pfohl Boatyard
- Woodward Wetland

==== Diamond Jo National River Center ====
- RiverWays
- Craver Stingray Touch Tank
- Rivers to the Sea
- RiverWorks
- National Rivers Hall of Fame
- Mississippi River Plaza
- River's Edge Cafe
- 3D/4D Large-format Digital Theater

== National Rivers Hall of Fame ==
The National Rivers Hall of Fame focuses on the lives of people who made their living on and around the rivers in the United States. The Hall of Fame was created in 1985 and over 100 experts on American rivers, including conservationists, writers and historians, voted for the first inductees. John P. Bickel was one of the driving forces behind the creation of the Hall of Fame which started fund-raising in 1979. The Hall of Fame building has a 62-seat theater.

=== Inductees ===
- 1986: Samuel Clemens, James Eads, Henry Shreve, Louis Joliet and Jacques Marquette.
- 1987: John Fitch, Robert Fulton, Merriwether Lewis, William Clark, Nicholas Roosevelt and an honorary award to Ralph Clark.
- 1988: De Witt Clinton, Mary B. Greene, Zadok Cramer and George Caleb Bingham.
- 1989: James Howard, Rene Robert Cavelier, Sieur de La Salle, John W. Cannon, and Diamond Jo Reynolds.
- 1990: John James Audubon, Stephen Collins Foster, Sacajawea, and Thomas P. Leathers.
- 1991: James Rees, J. P. Doremus, Constance Lindsay Skinner, and Isaiah Sellers.
- 1992: William Hopkins, Richard Bissell, Henry Rowe Schoolcraft, and Black Hawk.
- 1993: Frederick Way, Jr., John Wesley Powell, and Daniel Smith Harris.
- 1994: John A. Roebling, Washington Roebling, and James Rumsey.
- 1995: Mary Miller.
- 1996: Stephen H. Long and Betty Blake.
- 1997: E. W. Gould and Grant Marsh.
- 1998: King Fisher, Henry Bosse, and Alexander Mackenzie.
- 1999: Karl Bodmer and Louis Armstrong.
- 2000: William Peter Sprague and Charles Ellet, Jr.
- 2001: Ben Lucien Burman, George Catlin, and Callie Leach French.
- 2002: Fate Marable and Joseph LaBarge.
- 2003: Zebulon Pike and Ernest E. Wagner.
- 2004: Jim Bridger and Orrin Ingram and the Ingram Family,
- 2005: Philip Suiter and Louis C. Hunter.
- 2006: William Peteresen and the Showboat Team.
- 2007: Charles Ward and Abraham Lincoln.
- 2008: James Burns, Rene August Chouteau and Pierre Chouteau.
- 2009: Blanche Douglass Leathers and David Thompson.
- 2010: George Byron Merrick and Mike Fink.
- 2011: William E. Merrill and Rachel Carson.
- 2012: C. C. Webber and William S. Hays.
- 2013: Jay Norwood "Ding" Darling and Jedediah Strong Smith.
- 2014: Andrew Atkinson Humphreys and Seth Eastman.
- 2015: Ulysses S. Grant and Samuel de Champlain.
- 2016: John Muir and Jane Muckle Robinson.
- 2017: Aldo Leopold and Minnie Mossman Hill.
- 2018: Stephen Beck Hanks and Rosalie Edge.

== See also ==
- Dubuque Freight House
- Port of Dubuque
- List of maritime museums in the United States
