= William M. Black (dredge) =

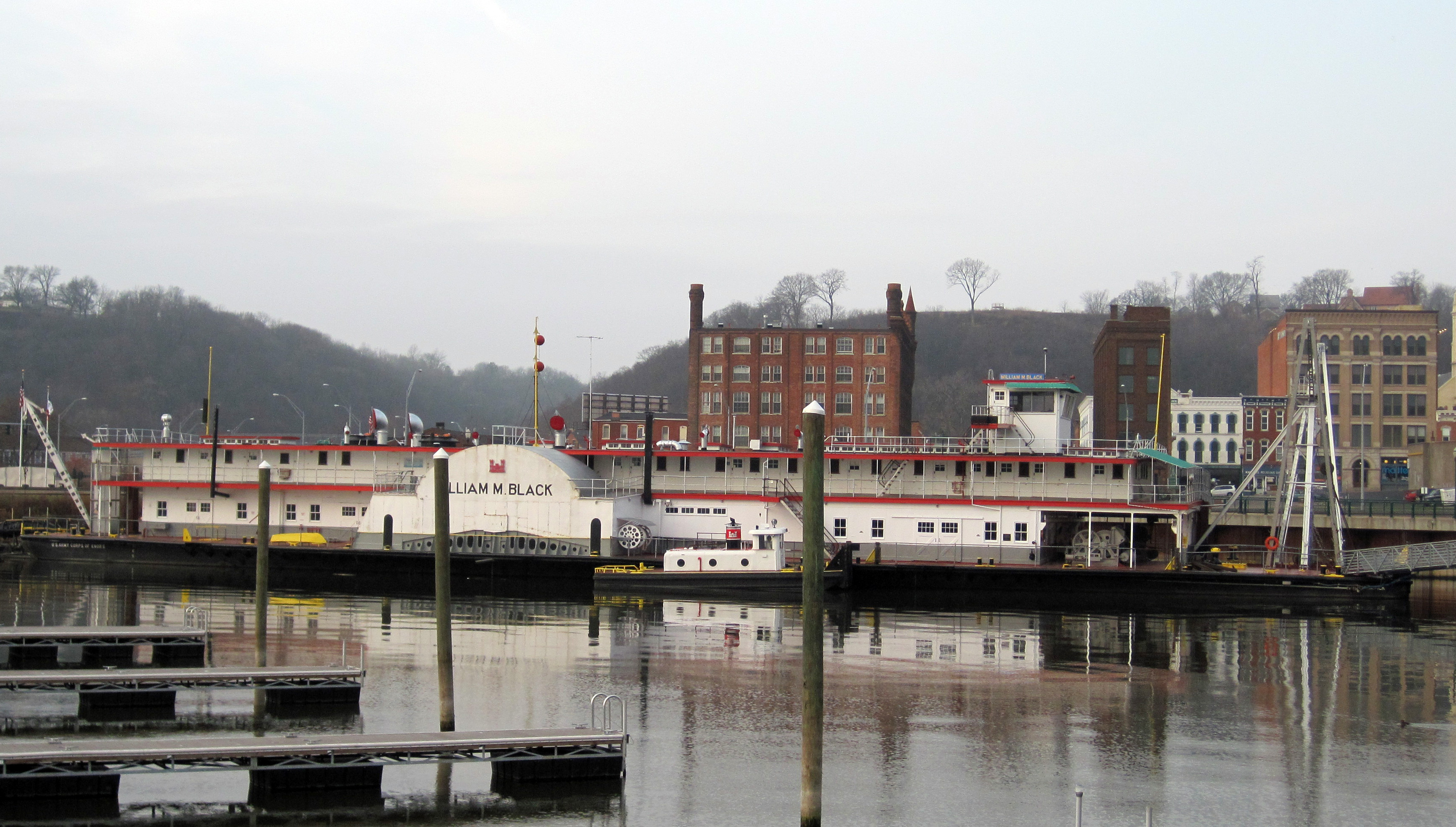

History

United States
- Name: William M. Black
- Owner: US Army Corps of Engineers; Woodward River Museum; National Mississippi River Museum & Aquarium
- Builder: Marietta Manufacturing Co.
- Launched: 1934
- Status: Museum ship

General characteristics
- Type: Dustpan dredge
- Length: 277 ft (84 m)
- Beam: 85 ft (26 m)
- Depth: 8 ft 6 in (2.59 m)
- Installed power: 2 × 600 hp (450 kW) reciprocating steam engines; 1 × 1,300 hp (970 kW) triple-expansion steam engine (Dredge pump)
- Propulsion: Sidewheels
- Crew: 49
- William M. Black (dredge)
- U.S. National Register of Historic Places
- U.S. National Historic Landmark
- Location within Iowa
- Location: Third Street at the Ice Harbor, Dubuque, Iowa
- Coordinates: 42°29′44″N 90°39′44″W
- Built: 1934
- Architect: Marietta Manufacturing Co.
- NRHP reference No.: 82002618

Significant dates
- Added to NRHP: 12 April 1982
- Designated NHL: 27 April 1992

William M. Black is a steam-propelled, sidewheel dustpan dredge, named for William Murray Black, now serving as a museum ship in the harbor of Dubuque, Iowa. Built in 1934, she is one of a small number of surviving steam-powered dredges, and one of four surviving United States Army Corps of Engineers dredges. She was declared a National Historic Landmark in 1992. She is open for tours as part of the National Mississippi River Museum & Aquarium.

== Description and history ==
William M. Black is located at the head of the Dubuque Harbor, where Ice Harbor Drive meets East 3rd Street. She has a riveted steel hull 277 feet (84 m) long, and 85 feet (26 m) wide at its widest point, including the paddleboxes for its sidewheels. Her hold is 8.5 feet (2.6 m) deep, and she has a scow-formed bow and no keel. Her superstructure has three decks, supported by a network of steel I-beams, so that heavy equipment could be supported anywhere within her structure. The dustpan dredge is mounted in front, with winched cables on either side to hold the ship in place during dredging operations. The paddleboxes are located about 2/3 of the way down the hull. The pump that operated the dredge was located in a forward position, with its steam power plant located just aft of its position. One of the ship's paddlewheels has been removed, and is on display on the museum grounds.

According to information provided on the tour, William M. Black, one of the last paddle steamers built in the US, was used primarily along the Missouri River. She had a crew of 49 and dredged 80,000 cubic yards (61,000 m^{3}) of material per day. She was placed out of service in 1973 because she consumed 7,000 US gallons (26,000 L; 5,800 imp gal) of heavy oil each day, which became prohibitively expensive during the 1973 OPEC oil embargo.

== See also ==
- List of National Historic Landmarks in Iowa
- National Register of Historic Places listings in Dubuque County, Iowa
