= Henry Peter Bosse =

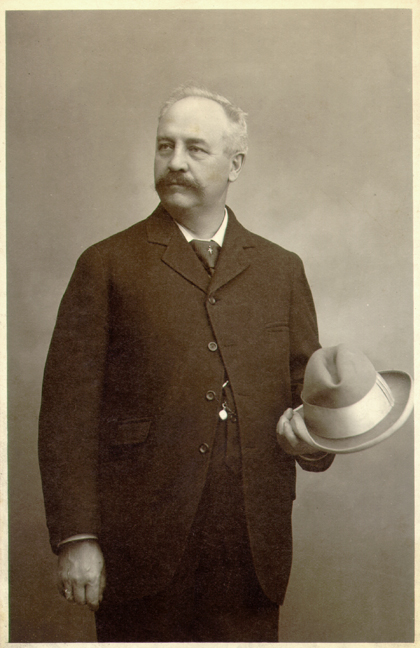
Portrait of Henry Peter Bosse in Rock Island, Illinois, c. 1900; courtesy William Quaintance, Moline, Illinois.

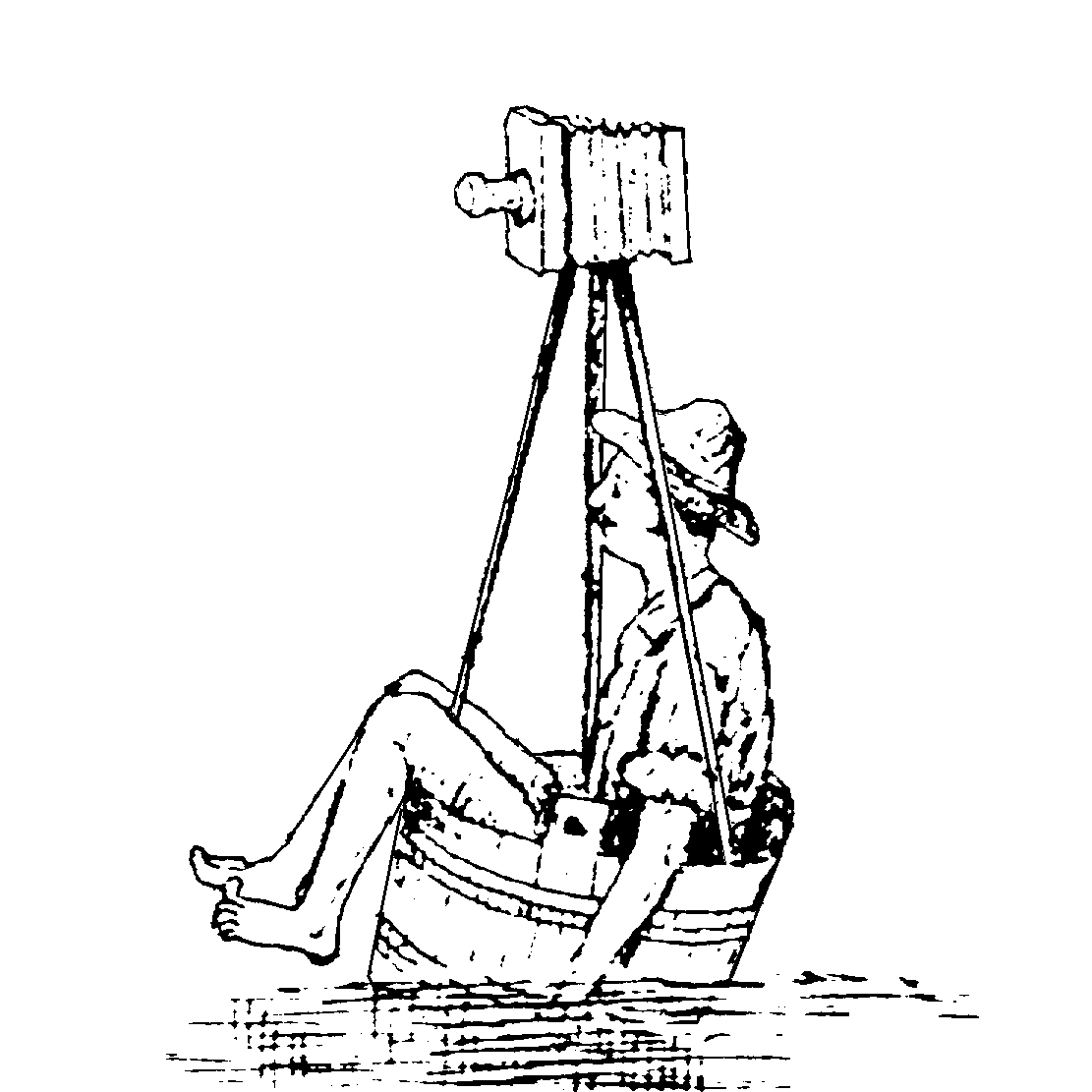
Cartoon self-portrait by Henry Peter Bosse c. 1890

Henry Peter Bosse (1844–1903) was a German-American photographer, cartographer and civil engineer.

== Biography ==
- 1844: Henry Peter Bosse is born November 13 at his father's estate, Sonnedorf in Prussian Saxony, where he spends his childhood. Little is known about Bosse's early life and education in Germany, although his surviving family asserts some connection to Abraham Bosse (1620–1676), the famous French engraver and topography theorist. Henry Peter Bosse claimed to be the grandson of Count August Neidhardt von Gneisenau.
- 1870: Henry Peter Bosse settles in Chicago upon emigrating to the United States. He finds employment in the stationery business. By the 1880s Bosse is employed as a draughtsman and cartographer with the Army Corps of Engineers at Rock Island, Illinois. Between 1882 and 1892 he photographs the upper Mississippi River with a passion for the land and the place.
- 1893: Henry Peter Bosse publishes his large format Views on the Mississippi River between Minneapolis, Minn and St. Louis, Mo. 1883–1891 as bound albums of meticulous, blue cyanotypes. One of these albums came into the possession of Alexander Mackenzie, Army Corps Chief of Engineers. Each of the 169 Mackenzie album cyanotypes is printed using an oval mask, and each is titled by Bosse in hand-written ink.
- 1894–95: Henry Peter Bosse's album Views on the Mississippi River between Minneapolis, Minn and St. Louis, Mo. 1883–1891 is shown at the World Columbian Exposition of 1893 in Chicago, a turning point in photographic history.

== An artist ==
Henry Peter Bosse work is characterized by refined technique and aesthetic principles that anticipated many of the qualities later associated with German photojournalism and photographic look books.

Bosse took great care in the production and presentation of his albums. His cyanotypes were produced from large glass plate negatives and printed on high-quality off-white French paper by Johannot et Cie., Annonay, with a satin finish. The cyanotype process enabled him to explore the expressive potential of color through the intense, atmospheric blues of his images at a time when color photography was not yet widely available. The albums were then leather bound.

Beyond technique, Bosse's work is distinguished by straightforward composition and a focus on human endeavor. His photographs express an appreciation for man-made industrial structures, particularly railroad bridges and structural steel, anticipating themes that would become central to German photographic look books concerned with craftsmanship, modern architecture, and urban design.

From the Bluffs at Fountain City, Wis. looking upstream, 1885; cyanotype No. 82 from Mackenzie album

Front St., Davenport, Ia during High water 1888; cyanotype No. 117 from Mackenzie album

Wagon Bridge at Fulton, Ill., 1889; cyanotype No. 198 from Mackenzie album

Iowa Central R'y Bridge at Keithsburg, Ill., 1889: cyanotype No. 204 from Mackenzie album

Wagon Bridge at Winona, Minn., 1892; cyanotype # 210 from Mackenzie album

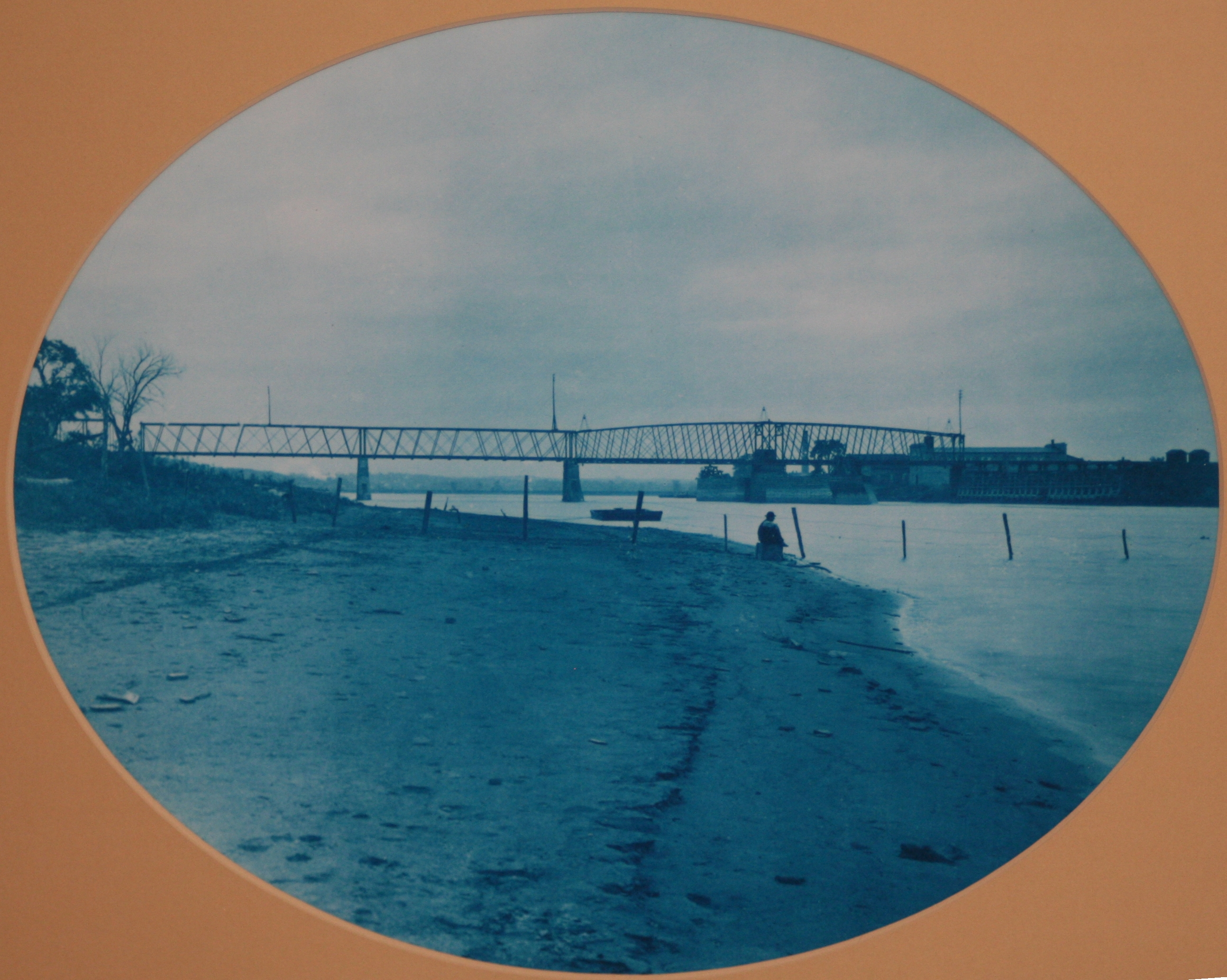
C.M. and St Paul RR Bridge Hastings 1885

== An engineer and a cartographer ==
Henry Peter Bosse was one of the highest-paid technical people of his day in the United States. The 1880s were the beginning of structural steel buildings and cable suspension bridges like Röbling's Brooklyn Bridge (1883); at the time Bosse was a top engineer at the key point where railroads companies wanted to cross the wide Mississippi River. Bosse's photography assisted with his creation of the most accurate map yet made of the upper Mississippi which, in turn, facilitated the engineering of bridges, locks and levees. Several variants of his drawn maps exist, while his album of photographs, per se, may have been the first photographic map of a major river ever created.

== In public collections ==
Since the Alexander Mackenzie album of Henry Bosse cyanotypes surfaced at a Sotheby's auction in 1990, Henry Bosse's cyanotype photographs have been included in the permanent collections at the J. Paul Getty Museum in Los Angeles. The San Francisco Museum of Modern Art in California, The New York Metropolitan Museum of Art, the Amon Carter Museum of Art in Texas, the Nelson-Atkins Museum of Art in Kansas City, Missouri, the National Museum of American Art in Washington D.C., and the Minneapolis Institute of Arts in Minnesota. The United States Army Corps of Engineers offices at Rock Island, Illinois and St. Paul, Minnesota, the Mayo Clinic in Rochester, Minnesota, the National Mississippi River Museum & Aquarium in Dubuque, Iowa, and elsewhere also retain Bosse photograph albums. The Corp offices also have various Bosse photographs, charts/maps and ephemera.

== An inventory ==
An inventory of known Henry Peter Bosse photographic views and print variants was first assembled by Bob Wiederanders of the Fred W. Woodward Riverboat Museum, Dubuque, Iowa. Kenton Spading, P.E., U.S Army Corps of Engineers, St. Paul District, with the capable assistance of Roberta (Bobbie) Peterson, expanded the inventory.
