= Chałas =

Chałas is a Polish surname derived from a nickname: "hałas" means 'noice, quarrel', etc. It has archaic feminine forms (still used colloquially): Chałasowa (by husband) and Chałasówna (by father). Notable people with the surname include:

- Romuald Chałas (born 1953), Polish rally driver, engineer and entrepreneur, president of the Automobile Club of Poland
- Tomasz Chałas (born 1988), Polish footballer

== See also ==
- Chalas (surname)
- Halas (surname)
