= Calas (surname) =

Calas is a surname. Notable people with the surname include:

- Jean Calas (1698–1762), Protestant executed for his faith
- Georges Calas (born 1948), French mineralogist
- Nicolas Calas (1907–1988), Greek-American poet and art critic
- Raoul Calas (1899–1978), French politician

== See also ==
- Chalas (surname)
