= Kalas (surname) =

Kalas or Kalaš (Czech feminine forms: Kalasová, Kalašová) is a surname. Origins are said to be Greek, German and Polish. The meaning is one who coated the inside of pots and pans; one who came from Kalisz, a city in Poland. Along with meaning ‘stranger’, ‘foreigner’. Notable people include:

- Ellsworth Kalas (1923–2015), American seminary president
- Freddy Kalas (born 1990), Norwegian singer
- Harry Kalas (1936–2009), American sportscaster
- Josef Kalaš, Czechoslovak rower
- Kane Kalas (born 1989), American poker player
- Karel Kalaš (1910–2001), Czech actor
- Klementina Kalašová (1850–1889), Czech opera singer
- Milan Kalas, Czechoslovak canoeist
- Paul Kalas (born 1967), American astronomer
- Todd Kalas (born 1965), American sportscaster
- Tomáš Kalas (born 1993), Czech footballer
