= Kalla (disambiguation) =

Kalla may refer to:

== Places ==
- Kalla, village and a mandal in West Godavari district in the state of Andhra Pradesh in India
- Kalla, Asansol, neighbourhood in Asansol, West Bengal, India
- Kalla, Iran, a village in East Azerbaijan Province, Iran
- Kallavesi, a lake in Finland

== Other ==
- KALLA or Karlsruhe Liquid-metal Laboratory
- Kalla (name)

== See also ==
- Calla (disambiguation)
- Kallas
- Kallu (name)
