= Calpas =

River of ancient Bithynia

Calpas or Kalpas, also known as Calpe or Kalpe (Ancient Greek: Κάλπη) was a river of ancient Bithynia draining into the Black Sea, between the Psilis, from which it is 210 stadia distant, and the Sangarius River. Near its mouth was the port of Calpe, through which Xenophon passed on his retreat with the Ten Thousand. Xenophon has minutely described the place as being about halfway between Byzantium and Heraclea Pontica on a promontory, part of which projects into the sea as an abrupt precipice. The neck which connects the promontory with the mainland is only 400 feet (120 m) wide. The port is under a rock to the west and has a beach. Close to the sea there is a source of fresh water. Apollonius of Rhodes calls the river "deep flowing".

It is identified with the modern Ilaflı Dere.
