= Callie Kazumi =

- Born: Caroline Robertson; 12 July
- Other names: Callie Robertson; C.K. Robertson
- Education: University of Stirling
- Years active: 2016–present

Caroline Kazumi Sutherland (née Robertson; born 12 July), known professionally as Callie Kazumi, is a British novelist. She is known for her thriller and horror novels Cuckoo (2025) and Greedy (2026).

== Early life ==
Caroline Robertson grew up in East Grinstead, Sussex. Her father was born in Colombia to a Scottish father and a Colombian mother, while her mother Mieko was born in Brazil to Japanese parents. Kazumi graduated with a Bachelor of Arts (BA) in Journalism and Politics at the University of Stirling.

== Career ==
Kazumi began her career as a copywriter and blogger. Under the names Callie Robertson and C.K. Robertson, she self-published two young adult (YA) novels. In 2019, she began working for Hodder & Stoughton in 2019 as a digital marketing manager.

In 2023, Century (a Cornerstone/Penguin Random House imprint) acquired the rights to publish her debut adult thriller novel Claire, Darling, also known as Cuckoo, as Callie Kazumi in 2025.

Kazumi's second novel Greedy was published in 2026. Greedy was a Service95 Book Club pick and Radio Times pick, and one of the most read books on Goodreads in February 2026 and in the top 15 horror books of 2026, while the audiobook version read by Ami Okumura Jones was an Audible Summerween pick.

== Bibliography ==
- Enmity (2018)
- A Girl Called Whisper (2019)
- Cuckoo (2025) (also published as Claire, Darling)
- Greedy (2026)
