= Calla, Ohio =

Unincorporated community in Ohio, U.S.

Coordinates: 40°58′21″N 80°46′14″W

Calla is an unincorporated community in Mahoning County, in the U.S. state of Ohio. The community lies about 4 miles (6.5 km) south of Canfield.

== History ==
A post office called Calla was established in 1889, and remained in operation until 1933. Besides the post office, Calla has an Evangelical church, established in 1864.
