= Raoul Calas =

French politician

Raoul Calas (25 March 1899, Thézan-lès-Béziers - 23 December 1978) was a French politician. He represented the French Communist Party in the Constituent Assembly elected in 1945, in the Constituent Assembly elected in 1946 and in the National Assembly from 1946 to 1951 and from 1956 to 1958.
