= Klementina Kalašová =

Czech opera singer

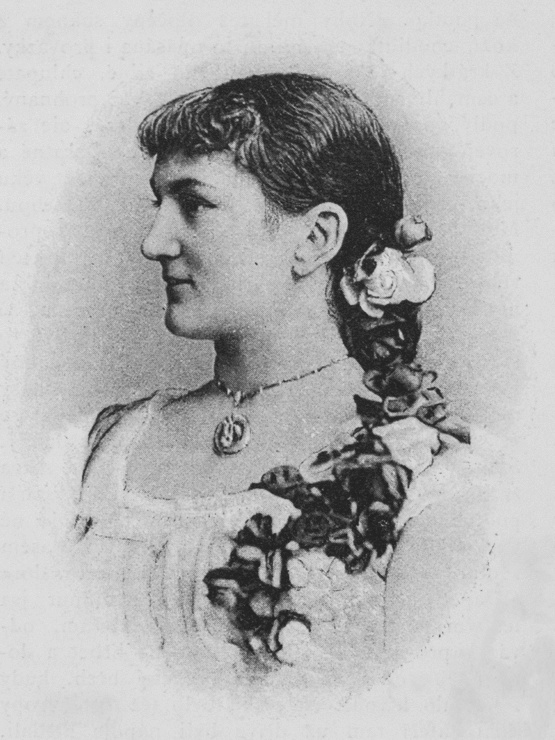
Klementina Kalasova

Klementina Kalašová (9 September 1850 – 13 June 1889) was a Czech opera singer with an international career, sometimes billed as Clémence Kalas.

== Early life ==
Klementina Kalašová was born at Horní Beřkovice, the daughter of Martin and Amálie Kalaš. Her father was a physician and a friend of composer Bedřich Smetana. Her sister Marie Kalašová became a noted writer; her sister Zdeňka Kalašová became a painter. She was educated at Roudnice nad Labem, and studied music in Prague, Milan, and St. Petersburg.

== Career ==
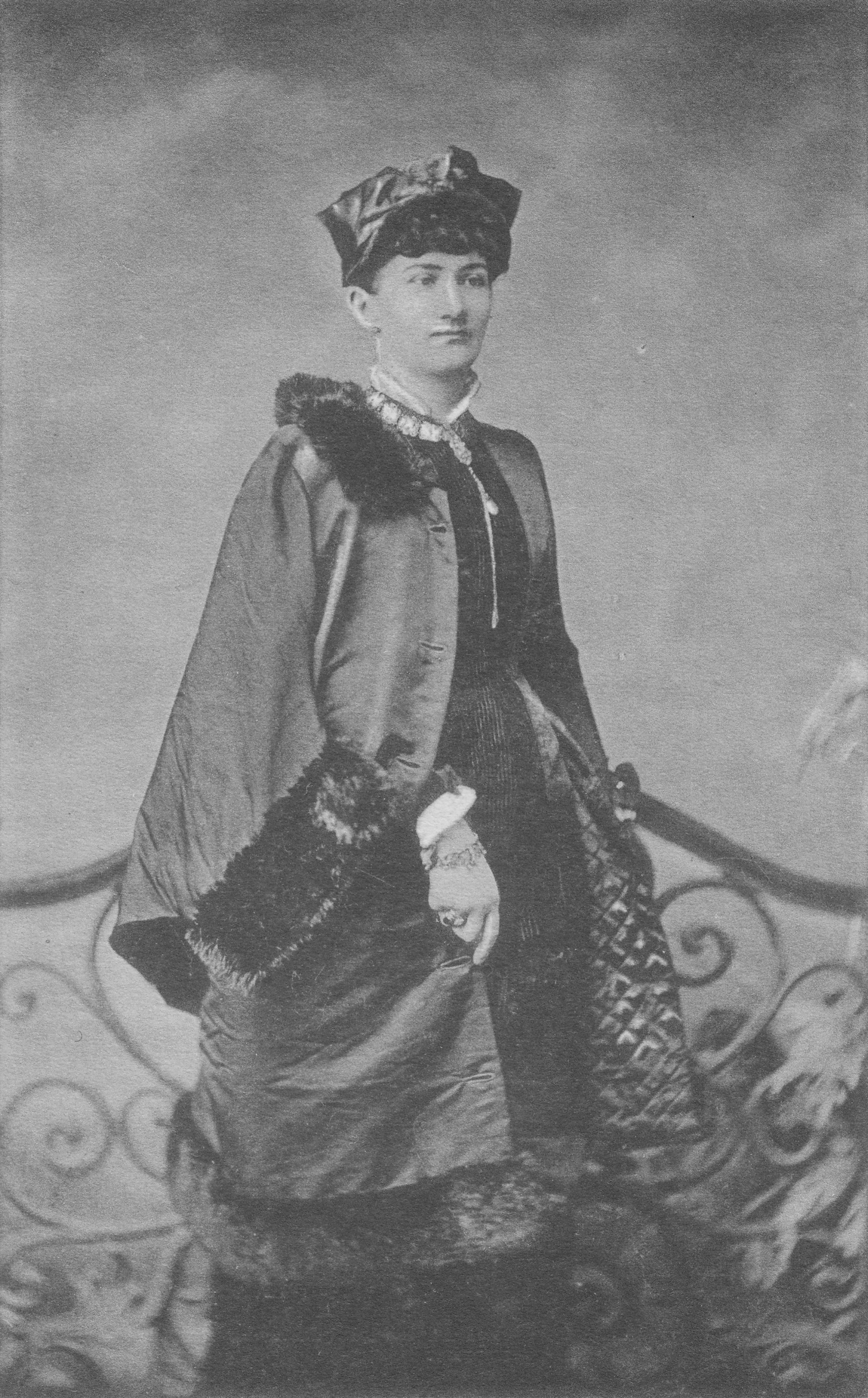
Klementina Kalasova 1875

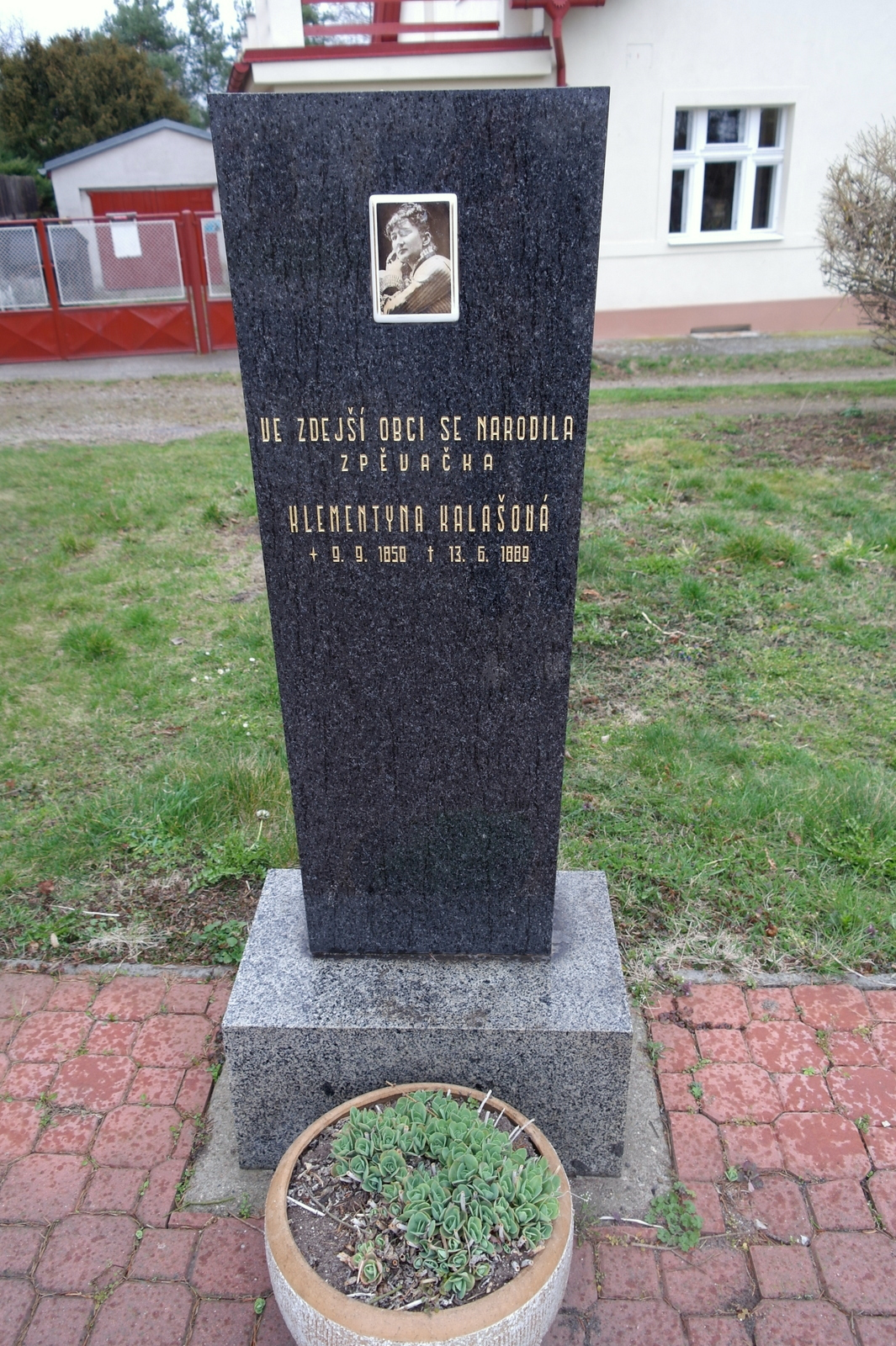
A monument to Klementina Kalašová, in Horní Beřkovice

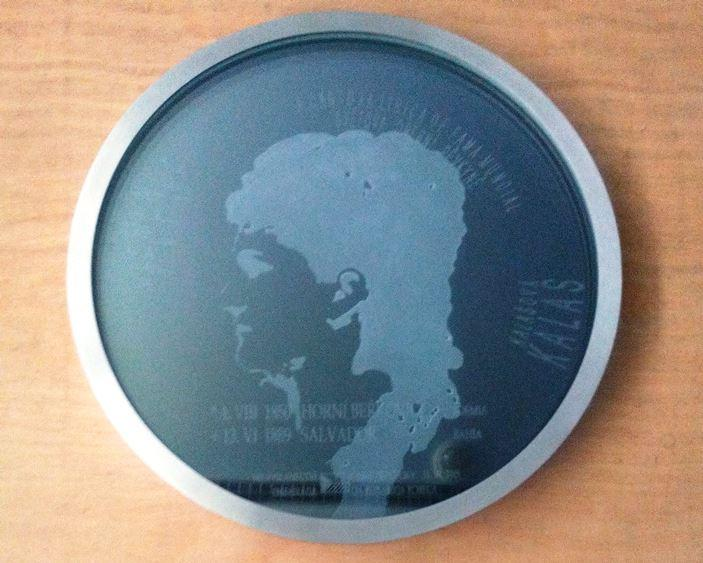
Memorial plaque to Klementina Kalašová by David Vávra on the entrance gate to the Quinta dos Lázaros cemetery, Salvador, Brazil.

Kalašová, a mezzo-soprano, made her opera debut in 1874 in Moscow. From 1874 to 1877 she was under contract to sing opera at Covent Garden in London; she was featured there in Carmen, Lohengrin, and Orfeo ed Euridice. In 1880 she toured North and South America with an Italian opera company, finding particular welcome among Bohemian immigrants in Chicago. She returned to the Western Hemisphere in 1882 to tour Brazil with composer Antônio Carlos Gomes. From 1883 to 1884 she was a member of the National Theatre in Prague. A second tour of Brazil followed in 1888.

== Personal life ==
Klementina Kalašová died in Salvador, Bahia in 1889, from yellow fever. She was 38 years old. Her grave is in Brazil, but there is also a monument to her memory in her home village, and a memorial plaque in Roudnice nad Labem. In 2015 the Czech embassy in Brazil held commemorations in tribute to Kalašová, including a concert featuring Czech singer Edita Randová with the Bahia Symphony Orchestra.
