= Calpe (Bithynia) =

Port city of ancient Bithynia in Asia Minor

Coordinates: 41°08′37″N 30°11′47″E

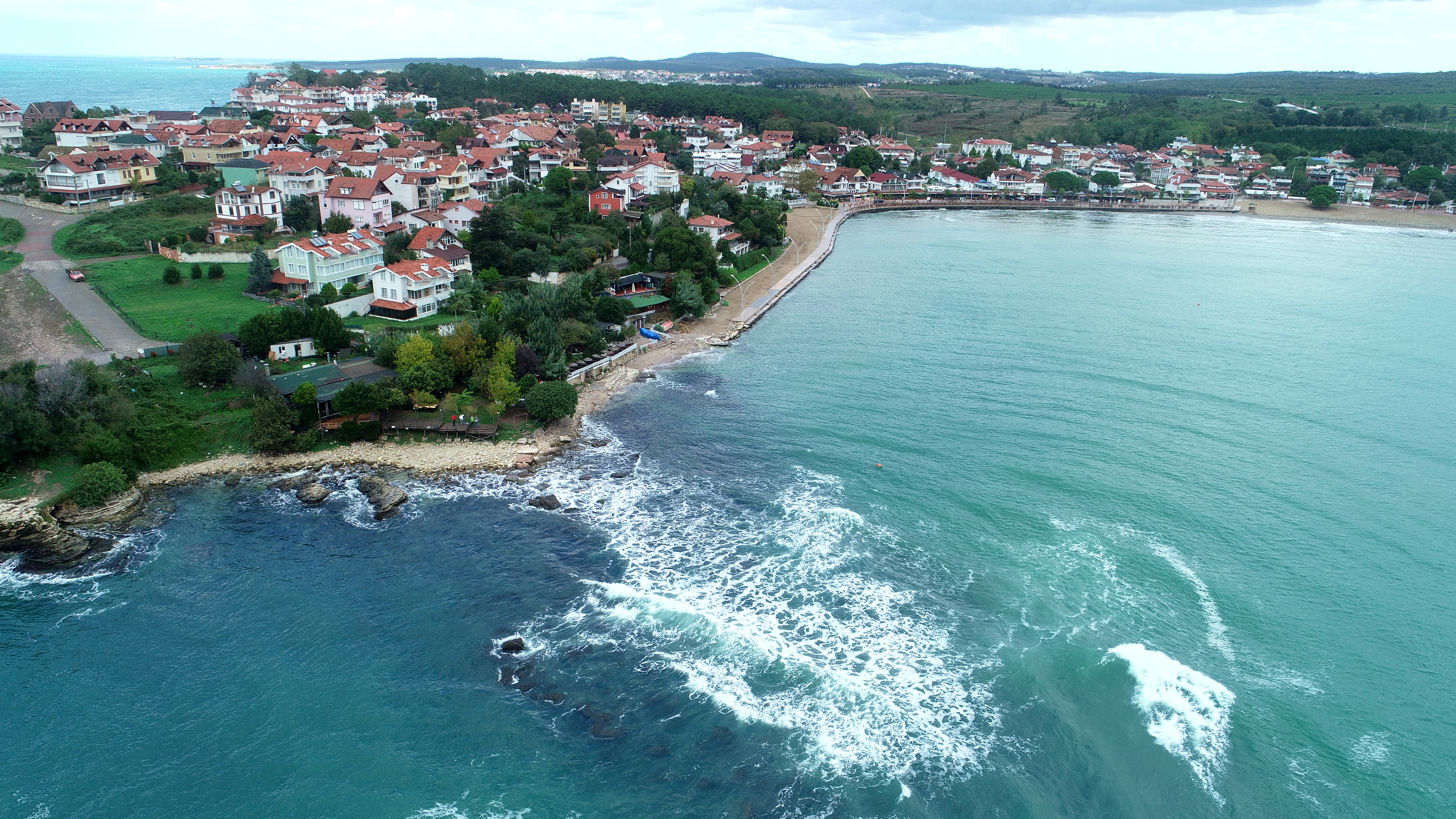

Calpe (Ancient Greek: Κάλπη, romanized: Kalpē), also Kalpas or Calpas, was a port city of ancient Bithynia in Asia Minor, on the shore of the Black Sea. It was located not far from the mouth of the river Calpas (modern Ilaflı Dere). It was mentioned in Xenophon's Anabasis. Xenophon, who passed through the place on his retreat with the Ten Thousand, describes it as about halfway between Byzantium and Heraclea Pontica on a promontory, part which projects into the sea is an abrupt precipice. The neck which connects the promontory with the mainland is only 400 feet (120 m) wide. The port is under the rock to the west, and has a beach; and close to the sea there is a source of fresh water. The place is minutely described by Xenophon. The place is mentioned also by Pliny the Elder, Solinus, Arrian, who places it 210 stadia from the mouth of the Psilis, and Stephanus of Byzantium.

Its site is located near Kerpe (or Kirpe) in Asiatic Turkey.
