= Callie Leach French =

American steamboat captain and pilot (1861–1935)

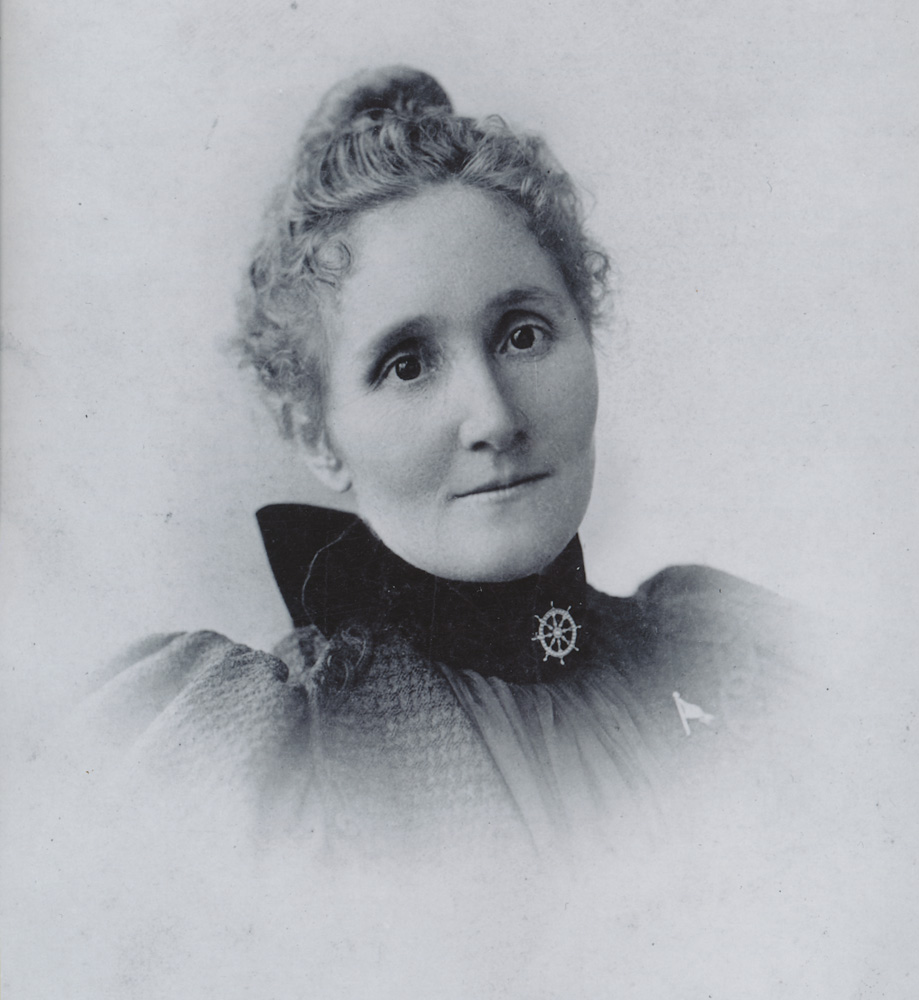
Captain Callie Leach French, circa 1890.

Callie M. Leach French ("Aunt Callie" 1861–1935) was an American steamboat captain and pilot. For much of her career as a captain, she worked with her husband, towing showboats along the Ohio, Monogahela and Mississippi Rivers. She played the calliope, cooked, sewed, and wrote jokes for the showboat theater. She never had an accident in her career and was the first woman to hold a masters and pilot's license for a steamboat.

== Biography ==
French was born in Jackson County or Jefferson County, Ohio and lived in Cincinnati. French married Captain Augustus Byron French in 1878. Augustus Byron French owned a steamboat, named C.O., which traveled along the Ohio and Mississippi Rivers, towing a theater. He taught Callie to pilot and suggested that she should pursue her pilot's license in New Orleans, where she earned a first class license in 1888. This made her the second woman to hold this license in the United States. It also helped save the couple money. In April 1890 she earned pilot's license for the Ohio and Monogahela Rivers. In 1892, she earned her master's license, making her the only woman to hold both. In addition in April 1893, she was admitted as the first woman member of the American Association of Masters and Pilots of Steam Vessels. When she brought her boat to land at the docks, she "attracted considerable attention among the river men," and she was acknowledged to be an excellent captain, according to the Louisville Post.

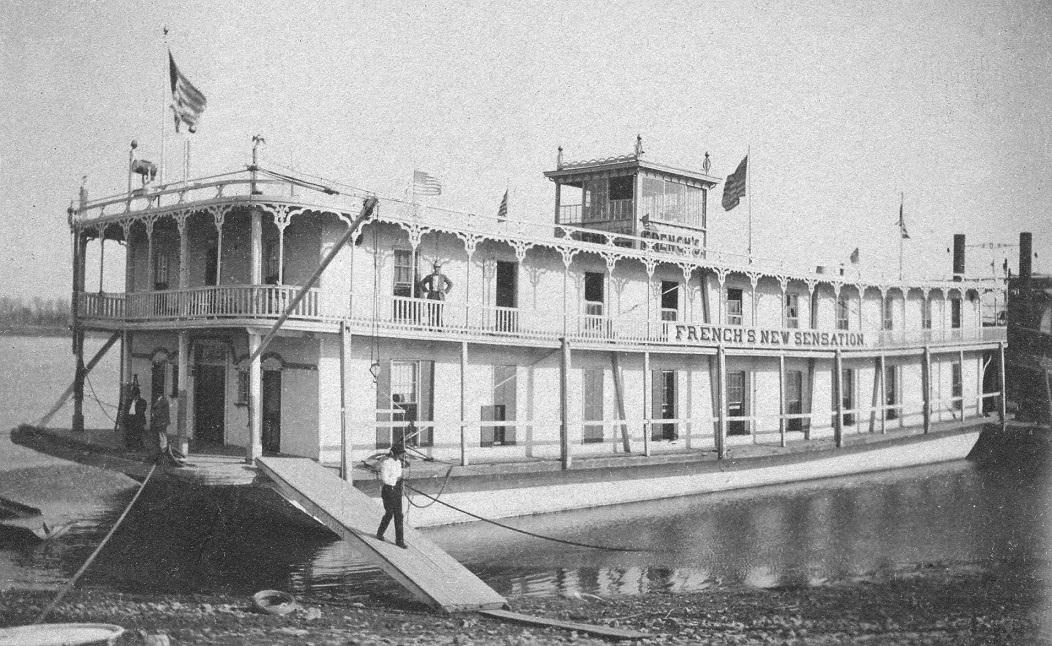
French's New Sensation showboat, owned by A.B. French and Callie French.

French's steamboat was called the Mary Stuart and it towed a houseboat named the Sensation which had a theater which could seat 600 people. The couple partnered with John McNair, who was an engineer, tuba player and actor. Shows such as melodramas typical of the day were performed in the theater and French wrote jokes for shows as well. The boat also had a calliope which could be heard from the river with French playing it to attract customers. She was known as "Aunt Callie" to her patrons. She cooked, sewed and acted as a nurse when necessary. She was also an expert swimmer.

Around 1902, she and her husband purchased land in Columbia, Alabama where they intended to retire. Augustus French never made it to retirement, dying in a hotel in Cincinnati and leaving French as the sole owner of the steamboats. John McNair and his wife Ida helped French with management of the crew and programming respectively. French continued to travel on the river until 1907, then sold out her share and retired to Alabama. She never had an accident or lost a boat.

French later married Chas H. Tomlinson in Alabama. She died in 1935 and was buried in the Columbia Cemetery. In 1991 French was inducted into the National Maritime Hall of Fame. French was inducted into the National Rivers Hall of Fame in 2001.
