= Cally Oldershaw =

British gemologist and educator

Cally Oldershaw is a gemologist and science educator. She is the author of several very widely held books about gems. Oldershaw is Liaison Officer for the Geological Society of London and an examiner for the Gemmological Association of Great Britain.

== Bibliography ==
- Gems of the World. (in 442 WorldCat libraries)
- Firefly guide to gems in 686 libraries according to Worldcat
- Gemstones (published in association with the Natural History Museum).
- Atlas of geology and landforms and Rocks and minerals close up (elementary and junior high school textbooks)

She also wrote the multiple parts of the Geological society of London series of booklets, Earth in our Hands, and many parts of the Series: Closer look at... series for children published by Copper Beech Books.
