= Kalachevsky (rural locality) =

Kalachevsky Калачёвский
- Khutor
- Location within Volgograd Oblast Location within Russia
- Coordinates: 50°33′N 42°59′E
- Country: Russia
- Region: Volgograd Oblast
- District: Kikvidzensky District
- Time zone: UTC+4:00

Kalachevsky (Russian: Калачёвский) is a rural locality (a khutor) and the administrative center of Kalachyovskoye Rural Settlement, Kikvidzensky District, Volgograd Oblast, Russia. The population was 675 as of 2010. There are 14 streets.

== Geography ==
Kalachevsky is located on Khopyorsko-Buzulukskaya plain, on the Karman River, 27 km southwest of Preobrazhenskaya (the district's administrative centre) by road. Kuzkin is the nearest rural locality.
