= Callie duPerier =

American barrel racer (born 1993)

Callie duPerier (born March 17, 1993) is an American professional rodeo cowgirl who specializes in barrel racing. In December 2015, she won the Women's Professional Rodeo Association (WPRA) barrel racing world championship at the National Finals Rodeo (NFR) in Las Vegas, Nevada.

== Life ==
Callie duPerier was born on March 17, 1993, in San Antonio, Texas. She currently resides in Boerne, Texas. She attended Schreiner University (Kerriville). duPerier grew up in Bandera, Texas. She married Kaleb Apffel in May 2016.

== Career ==
duPerier joined the Women's Professional Rodeo Association in 1993.

=== 2014 and earlier seasons ===
In 2014, she finished the season ranked 25th in the year with $44, 804. In 2010, she won the WPRA Junior World title with $14.476 aboard Makearocket Buzz "Fuzzy". duPere received an invitation to The American Rodeo more than once. She also has been competing in barrel racing since she was 12 years old.

=== 2015 season ===
In 2015, she won the World Barrel Racing Championship at the NFR on her horse Dillion. She finished the season with $303,846 in earnings. She also won the NFR Average with a total time of 140.41 seconds on 10 runs. She made qualified runs in 6 out of 10 runs to win $126,923 total at the NFR.

Other rodeos she won this season include the Champions Challenge Finale in Omaha, Nebraska; the Yellowstone River Round-Up in Billings, Montana; the Champions Challenge in Pueblo, Colorado; the Molalla, Oregon, Buckaroo Rodeo; the St. Paul, Oregon, Rodeo where she set a new record; the Jasper, Texas, Lions Benefit Rodeo; and the Champions Challenge in Kissimmee, Florida. She finished second at the New Mexico State Fair and Rodeo in Albuquerque, New Mexico, and at the Farm City Pro Rodeo in Hermiston, Oregon.

=== 2016 season ===
In 2016, she finished the season with $4,773.

== Horses ==
In 2015, her horse, registered name Rare Dillion, nicknamed Dillion, was awarded the WPRA Horse with the Most Heart. In 2017, Dillion was a 17-year-old buckskin gelding by Firecracker and out of Rare Class, who is a daughter of Dash Ta Diamonds. Dash Ta Diamonds is nicknamed Arson and is an 11-year-old sorrel gelding as of 2019. He is by Dash Ta Fame out of The Millennium Star.
