= Chalas (surname) =

Chalas is a surname. Notable people with the surname include:

- Émilie Chalas (born 1977), French politician
- Fany Chalas (born 1993), Dominican sprinter
- Juan Chalas (born 1956), Dominican judoka

== See also ==
- Chałas
- Chala (name)
