= Calle (Venetian street) =

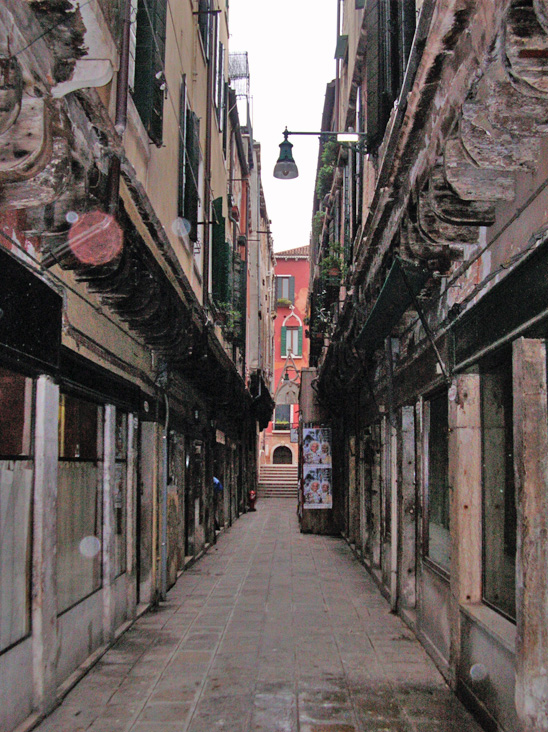
Calle del Paradiso in the Castello district of Venice

A Calle (Italian: Calle) is a typical Venetian street, located between two continuous rows of buildings. These streets are primarily residential, though they can also house shops and workshops on the ground floors. Streets running alongside Venetian canals are called fondamenta. The term "calle" comes from the Latin callis, meaning "path" or "track."

== Characteristics ==
The width of a calle varies significantly, ranging from less than a meter for the narrowest calliette, to three or four meters or more for the "wide calle" (calle larga).

The length of a calle also varies: from a few meters to several hundred meters for "long calle" (calli lunghe), which may have a winding profile.

Not all Venetian streets are named calle or fondamenta; some "long calle," historically significant due to the many commercial establishments along them, are referred to by the archaic terms ruga or rugeta.

Another term used for certain prominent streets is salizada (often mistakenly translated as "paved"). In practice, the term salizo e derivati covers both brick and stone pavements. This designation indicates that these streets were among the first to be paved with bricks at the end of the 14th century due to their importance. Before that, like other calli and squares, they had compacted earth surfaces. From the late 17th century, the bricks were replaced by masegni (literally: "stones"), a type of paving tile made from trachyte, which now covers almost all of Venice's streets.

Some dead-end or secondary calli that serve only as access routes to buildings along them are called ramo.

The term rio terà refers to streets created by filling in canals, a practice that became common in the 19th century but was sometimes used as early as the 12th century. The earliest examples still preserved in Venice's toponymy include Rio terà San Vio (just before 1408) in Dorsoduro and Rio terà della Maddalena (1498) in Cannaregio.

In Venice, the nomenclature for calli is diverse. Many calli are named after notable figures who lived in the area (e.g., Calle Foscarini), others reference proximity to a church or monastery (e.g., Calle drio la Chiesa, Calle de le Muneghe) or to professions or activities once carried out there, such as Calle del Forner (Baker’s Street), Calle dei Fabbri (Blacksmith’s Street), and Calle del Squero (Boat Builder’s Street). In some cases, names are based on stories, like Rio terà Barba Frutariòl, meaning "Canal filled by the fruit vendor uncle." In other cases, calli were named after the professions conducted there—Spadaria for sword-makers, Frezzaria for arrow-makers, Merceria for textile merchants, and Casselleria for artisans making ivory gift boxes.

Some calle names are duplicated throughout Venice, such as Calle San Doménego, Calle della Chiesa, and Calle de l’Ogio, located in different sestiere of the city.

== Calli beyond Venice ==
Calli are found in all the towns of the Venetian Lagoon, such as Chioggia, Malamocco, Burano, Murano, and others.

The term "calle" is also preserved in various towns beyond the lagoon, with streets called "calle" found in the center of Muggia, Mestre, Caorle, Garda, Lazise, Grado, and Loreo.

The term "calle" is sometimes used in parts of the former Venetian dominion on the eastern Adriatic, such as Istria and Dalmatia; its Croatian form is kala. For example, the main street of Zadar in Dalmatia is still called Kalelarga.

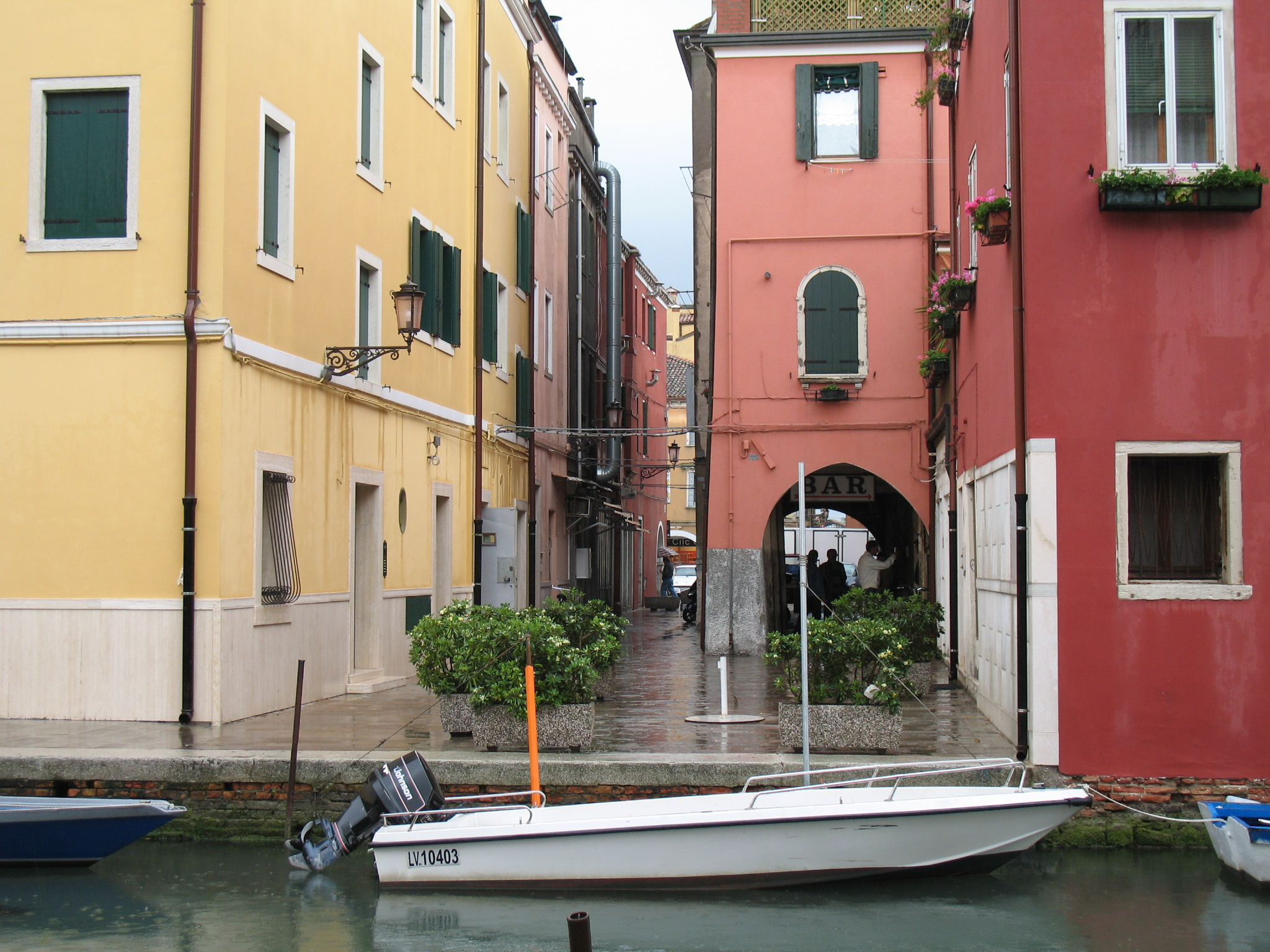
Calle in Chioggia

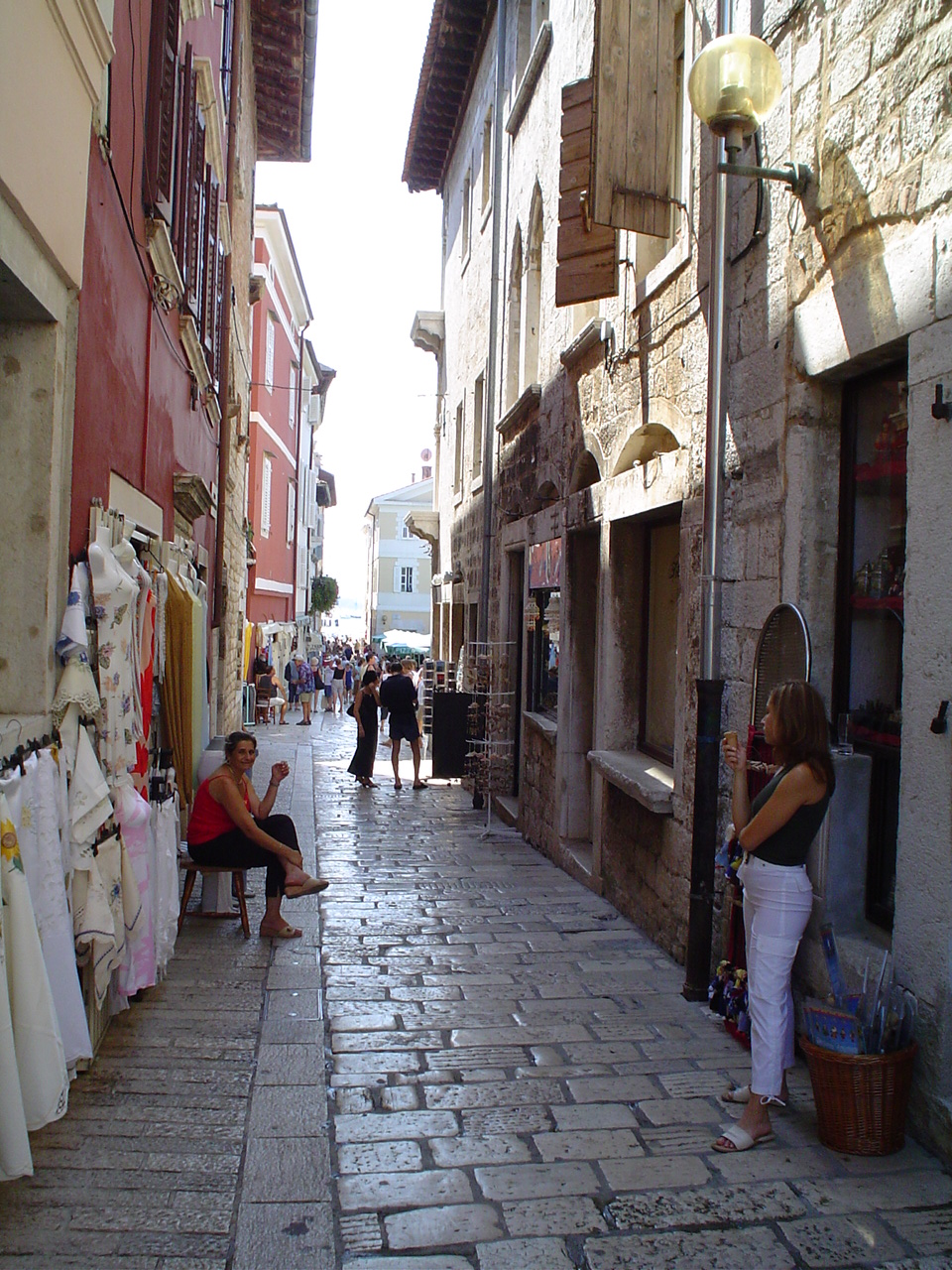
Calle in Poreč

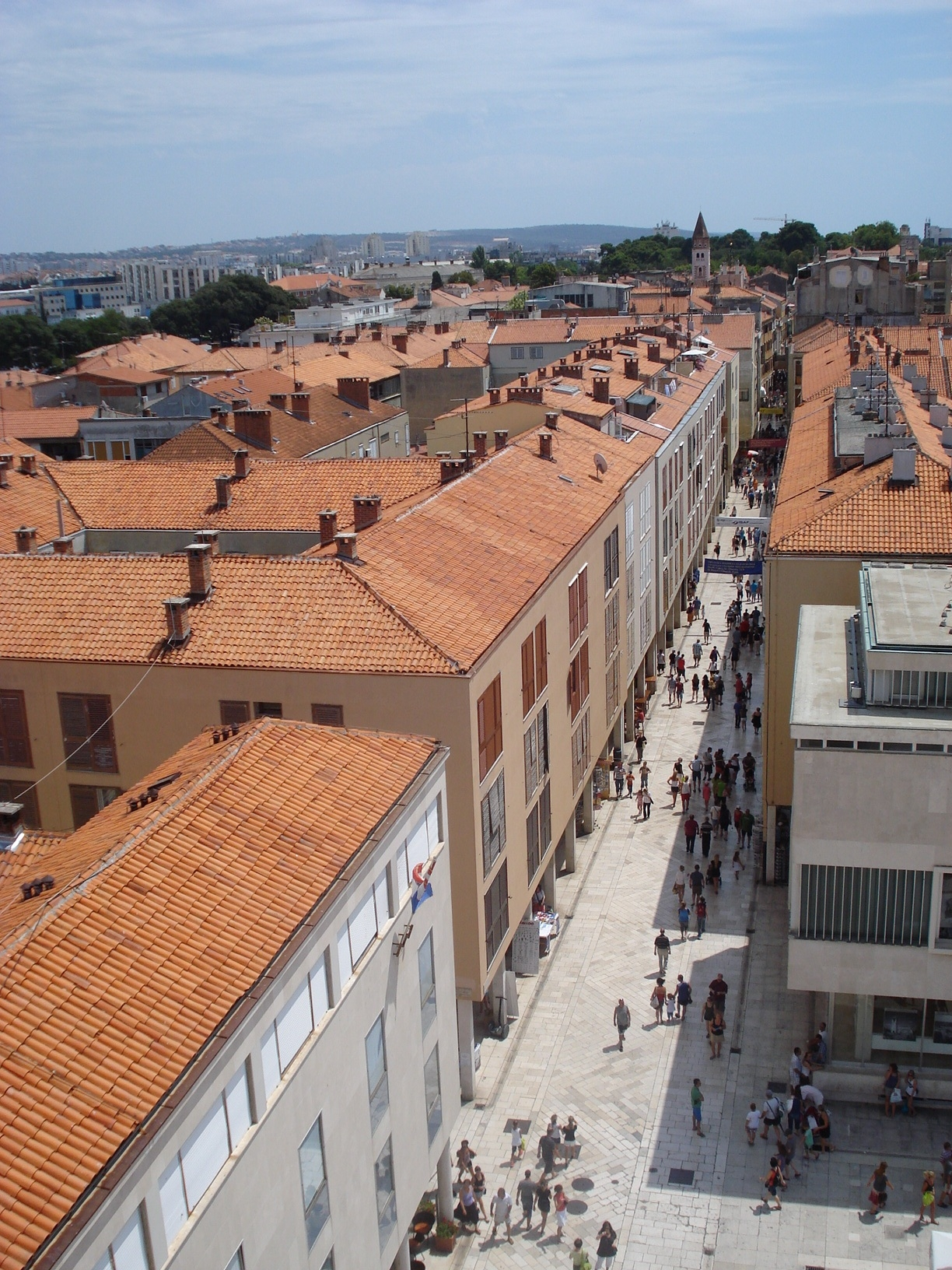
Kalelarga in Zadar

== Sources ==
- Concina, Ennio (1988). Pietre parole storia (in Italian). Venice: Marsilio.
- Gaier, Martin (2018). Appunti per una storia della pavimentazione esterna a Venezia (in Italian). Venice: Cierre.
- Perocco, Guido; Salvadori, Antonio (1976). Civiltà di Venezia (in Italian). Venice: Stamperia di Venezia.
- Zucchetta, Gianpietro (1995). Un'altra Venezia – Immagini e storia degli antichi canali scomparsi (in Italian). Venice: Erizzo-Unesco.
