= Canadian Association for Laboratory Animal Science =

Not-for-profit organization formed in 1962

The Canadian Association for Laboratory Animal Science (CALAS), a not-for-profit membership association, was formed in 1962.

CALAS has 900 members, being veterinarians, physicians, researchers, administrators and technicians. The national office is located in Toronto, Ontario.

== Annual symposium ==
Each spring since 1962, CALAS has held a national Symposium. The CALAS Symposium is a networking and educational event for the laboratory animal science community in Canada. It brings members and non-members together for four days of knowledge building workshops, discussions, demonstrations and networking.

Eleven professional and technical awards for recognition in the field of laboratory animal science are presented each year at the symposium. The symposium is the only laboratory animal conference held each year in Canada and attracts more than 400 members from the industry.

== Publications ==
The Member's Magazine serves as an official communication tool for CALAS. The magazine, published bi-monthly, includes referred articles, case studies and association news. The CALAS Member's Magazine is sent to all members, targeting individuals involved in research utilizing animals, which includes pharmaceutical companies, hospitals, universities and more. The magazine also reaches teaching institutions where students are pursuing animal-related careers, such as Veterinary Science and Animal Health Technology. The content of the magazine is varied to satisfy the animal care assistant, animal/veterinary technician, scientist, veterinarian and administrative personnel.

== Membership ==
There are several types of CALAS memberships available.

Non-Registered Membership Types do not require specific qualifications and are open to all those interested in the animal laboratory sciences industry.

=== Institutional membership ===
Membership for institutions wishing to participate in efforts to improve the scientific quality of animal research and educational standards of animal care personnel. Institutional Membership includes two National membership cards for named representatives.

=== National membership ===
National Association Membership for individuals

=== Student membership ===
Membership at a reduced rate for students enrolled in a recognized educational institution.

The CALAS Registry Committee certifies technicians to ensure quality care possible for laboratory animals. The certification process includes a written exam and an oral exam, based on study guides and reference materials provided to eligible applicants.

=== Registered Technicians ===
A Registered Laboratory Animal Technician has an animal science education, training in the care and use of laboratory animals and on the job practical experience.

Associate Registered Laboratory Animal Technician These individuals have several years of experience in the field and an interest in continuing their education. An ARLAT is trained for the care and use of laboratory animals.

Registered Laboratory Animal Technician The Registered Laboratory Animal Technician (RLAT) and Registered Laboratory Animal Technician (Research) (RLAT(R)) are equivalent designations. The designations represent two streams rather than levels. The RLAT is employed by an animal facility, they have an animal science education, training in the care and use of laboratory animals and on the job practical experience. Continued development of this expertise enables him/her to obtain the knowledge base and practical competency required to meet the high standards set by the CALAS Registry examinations

RLAT(R): Registered Laboratory Animal Technician (Research) The RLAT(R) typically works for one researcher as opposed to being employed by an animal facility. This person is very focused in one area of research and usually works with only one or two species of animals. The person has in depth knowledge about their research project and the animal species they are working with. Their knowledge includes understanding how animal husbandry, the environment, and the operation of an animal facility affect their research.

RMLAT: Registered Master Laboratory Animal Technician The Master's achievement is the highest level of Registration. Successful candidates possess a knowledge of most laboratory animal species, their care, management and use in research. Typically RMLAT's are in supervisory positions or are candidates for such positions. They are able to compile facts, analyze the consequences of different approaches to any given animal research related problem and apply their knowledge in problem-solving and decision-making situations.

RMLAT(R): Registered Master Laboratory Animal Technician (Research) The background is similar to the RMLAT Registration but is applied to those individuals who have been involved primarily with specific laboratory animal species and projects. The individual has a laboratory animal science knowledge base enabling them to be a major contributor to a successful research program. They will be well versed in the anatomy, physiology, diseases and needs of the animal species they work with.

== Continuing education ==
Registered members must earn 10 continuing education (CE) credits per calendar year. CALAS continuing education credits are based on CALAS events. CALAS encourages education from other associations such as LAMA, CAAHTT, AALAS, etc.
