= HMS Calpe =

Two ships of the Royal Navy have borne the name HMS Calpe, named after an ancient name for the Rock of Gibraltar or Mons Calpe.

- HMS Calpe (1800), 14-gun sloop, formerly the Spanish San Josef, captured in 1800 and sold in 1802
- HMS Calpe (L71), Type II Hunt-class destroyer launched in 1941, transferred to the Royal Danish Navy in 1952 as the Rolfe Krake, and sold for scrapping in 1966
- HMS Calpe (1965 shore establishment), Headquarters of the Royal Naval Reserve at Gibraltar until 1993
