= Celle (disambiguation) =

Celle may refer to:

== Germany ==
- Celle, a city in Lower Saxony, Germany
- Celle (district), a district in eastern Lower Saxony

== Italy ==
- Celle, a district of the city of Rimini, Emilia-Romagna, best known for the Monumental Cemetery of Rimini
- Celle di Bulgheria, a municipality in the province of Salerno, Campania
- Celle di Macra, a municipality in the province of Cuneo, Piedmont
- Celle di San Vito, a municipality in the province of Foggia, Apulia
- Celle Enomondo, a municipality in the province of Asti, Piedmont
- Celle Ligure, a municipality in the province of Savona, Liguria
- Celle dei Puccini, a civil parish (frazione) of Pescaglia in the province of Lucca, Tuscany

== Slovenia ==
- an older name of Celje
