= Medvezhy Vzvoz =

Medvezhy Vzvoz Медвежий Взвоз
- Village
- Location within Vologda Oblast Location within Russia
- Coordinates: 60°31′N 46°31′E
- Country: Russia
- Region: Vologda Oblast
- District: Velikoustyugsky District
- Time zone: UTC+3:00

Medvezhy Vzvoz (Russian: Медвежий Взвоз) is a rural locality (a village) in Orlovskoye Rural Settlement, Velikoustyugsky District, Vologda Oblast, Russia. The population was 7 as of 2002.

== Geography ==
Medvezhy Vzvoz is located 63 km southeast of Veliky Ustyug (the district's administrative centre) by road. Smolinskoye is the nearest rural locality.
