= Medvezhye (Vologda Oblast) =

Medvezhye Медвежье
- Village
- Location within Vologda Oblast Location within Russia
- Coordinates: 59°18′N 38°39′E
- Country: Russia
- Region: Vologda Oblast
- District: Sheksninsky District
- Time zone: UTC+3:00

Medvezhye (Russian: Медвежье) is a rural locality (a village) in Sizemskoye Rural Settlement, Sheksninsky District, Vologda Oblast, Russia. The population was 33 as of 2002.

== Geography ==
Medvezhye is located 20 km northeast of Sheksna (the district's administrative centre) by road. Polezhayevo is the nearest rural locality.
