= Callas (disambiguation) =

Callas may refer to:

== People ==
- Charlie Callas (1924–2011), American comedian and actor
- Demetri Callas (1942–2020), American rock guitarist, member of the Four Seasons
- Maria Callas, Greek soprano and opera singer
- Peter G. Callas (1926–2022), American politician and educator
- Zoe Callas, a fictional character in the USA Network series, Law & Order: Criminal Intent

== Other ==
- Callas (river), a river in Euboea, Greece
- Callas Forever, a 2002 film directed by Franco Zeffirelli
- Callas, Var, a commune in the Var department, in France

== See also ==
- Kallas
- Calla (disambiguation)
