= Medvezhiy Glacier =

Glacier in Tajikistan

Medvezhy Glacier
- Ледник Медвежий
- Location within Tajikistan
- Type: Alpine glacier
- Location: Tajik National Academy of Sciences Range; Tajikistan
- Coordinates: 38°39′N 72°11′E
- Area: 25.3 km^{2} (9.8 sq mi)
- Length: 15.8 km (9.8 mi)

The Medvezhiy Glacier (Russian: ледник Медвежий; Bear Glacier) is an Alpine glacier in Tajikistan. The glacier is located on the western slope of the Tajik National Academy of Sciences Range at the heart of the Pamir Mountains.

== Bibliography ==
- Novikov, V. (2002) Severe Hydrometeorological Events and their Fluctuation. World Meteorological Organization, CBS Teschnical Conference poster, Accessed July 29, 2011.
- United Nations Environment Programme/GRID-Arendal (2007) Formation of lakes and glacier lake outburst floods (GLOFs) by Medvezhi Glacier, Pamirs. Accessed July 29, 2011.
- UN Chronicle (2009) Global Warming and Surging Glaciers. Accessed July 29, 2011.
