= Kalash, Iran =

Kalash كلاش
- Village
- Location within Iran
- Coordinates: 38°21′58″N 46°02′11″E
- Country: Iran
- Province: East Azerbaijan
- County: Shabestar
- Bakhsh: Sufian
- Rural District: Chelleh Khaneh

Population (2006)
  - Total: 343
- Time zone: UTC+3:30 (IRST)
  - Summer (DST): UTC+4:30 (IRDT)

Kalash (Persian: كلاش, also Romanized as Kalāsh; also known as Kalās, Keyālāsh, Kialāsh, and Kūlash) is a village in Chelleh Khaneh Rural District, Sufian District, Shabestar County, East Azerbaijan Province, Iran. At the 2006 census, its population was 343, in 82 families.
