= Psilis =

Ancient Greek river

Coordinates: 41°05′00″N 29°04′00″E

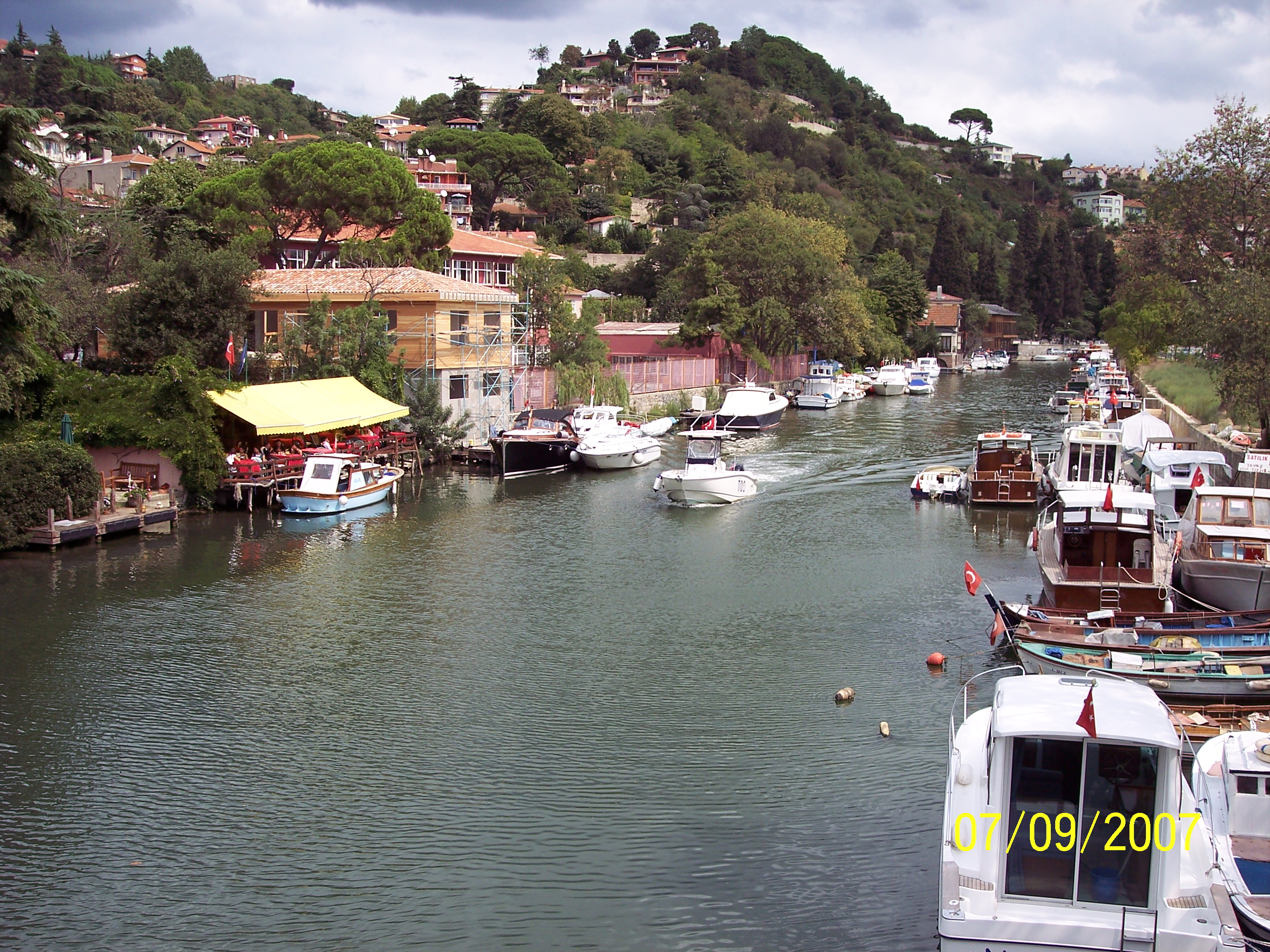
Psilis is identified with the modern Göksu Deresi

The Psilis (Ancient Greek: Ψίλις) or Psillis (Ψίλλις) was a river of ancient Bithynia that drained to the Pontus Euxinus.

It is identified with the modern Göksu Deresi.
