= Kalacheyevsky District =

Kalacheyevsky District Калачеевский район (Russian)
- District
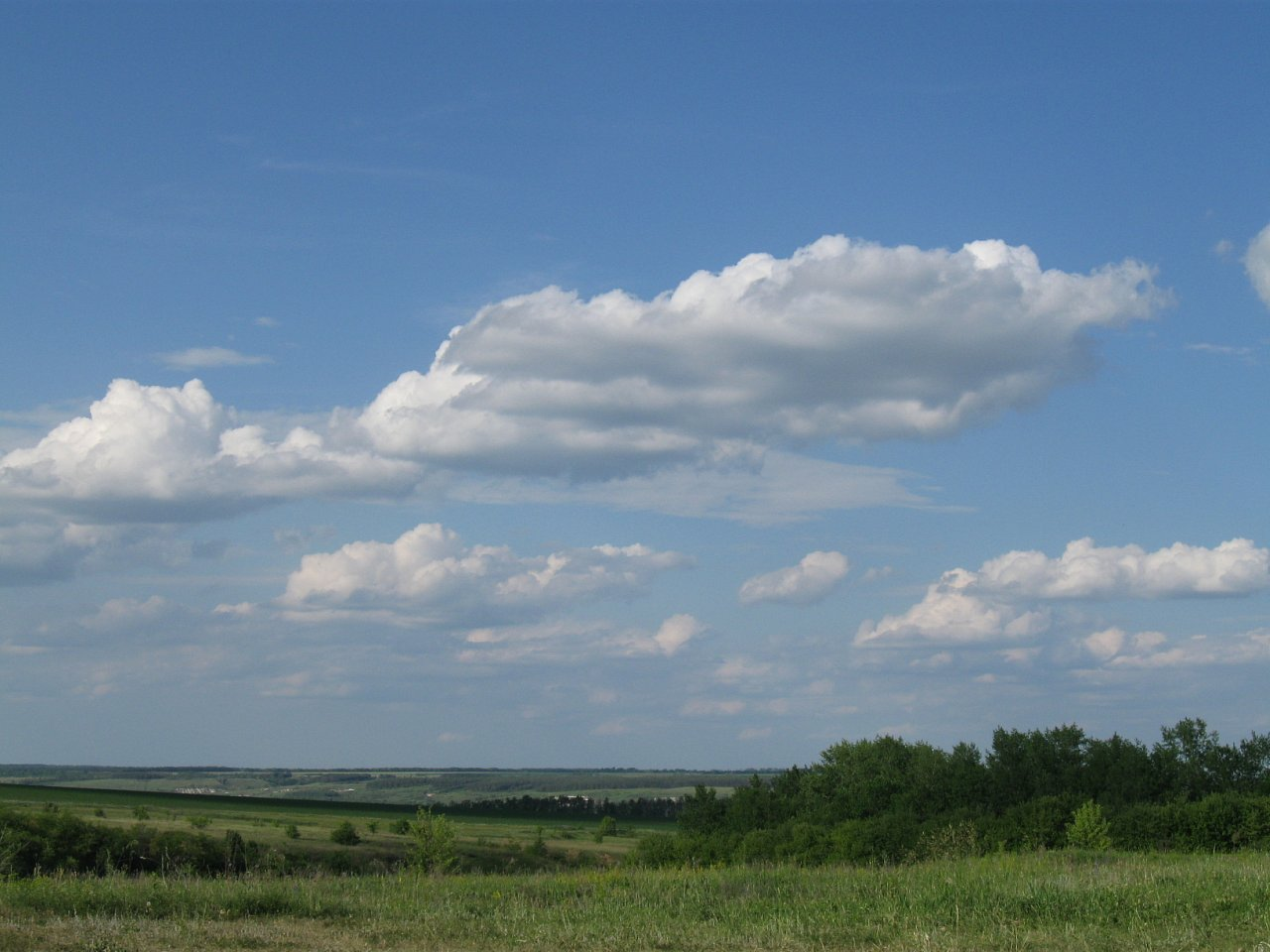
- Village Novomelovatka, Kalacheyevsky District

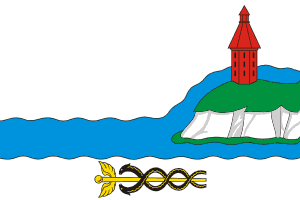
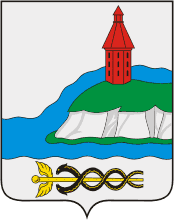
- Flag Coat of arms
- Location of Kalacheyevsky District in Voronezh Oblast
- Coordinates: 50°26′N 41°00′E
- Country: Russia
- Federal subject: Voronezh Oblast
- Established: 1928
- Administrative center: Kalach

Area
  - Total: 2,106 km^{2} (813 sq mi)

Population (2010 Census)
  - Total: 57,242
  - Density: 27.18/km^{2} (70.40/sq mi)
  - Urban: 35.0%
  - Rural: 65.0%

Administrative structure
  - Administrative divisions: 1 Urban settlements, 16 Rural settlements
  - Inhabited localities: 1 cities/towns, 47 rural localities

Municipal structure
  - Municipally incorporated as: Kalacheyevsky Municipal District
  - Municipal divisions: 1 urban settlements, 16 rural settlements
- Time zone: UTC+3 (MSK)
- OKTMO ID: 20615000
- Website: http://adminkalach.ru/

Kalacheyevsky District (Russian: Калаче́евский райо́н) is an administrative and municipal district (raion), one of the thirty-two in Voronezh Oblast, Russia. It is located in the east of the oblast. The area of the district is 2,106 square kilometers (813 sq mi). Its administrative center is the town of Kalach. Population: 57,242 (2010 Census); 61,794 (2002 census); 61,945 (1989 Soviet census). The population of Kalach accounts for 35.0% of the district's total population.
