= Kalach, Kalacheyevsky District, Voronezh Oblast =

Town in Voronezh Oblast, Russia

Kalach Калач
- Town
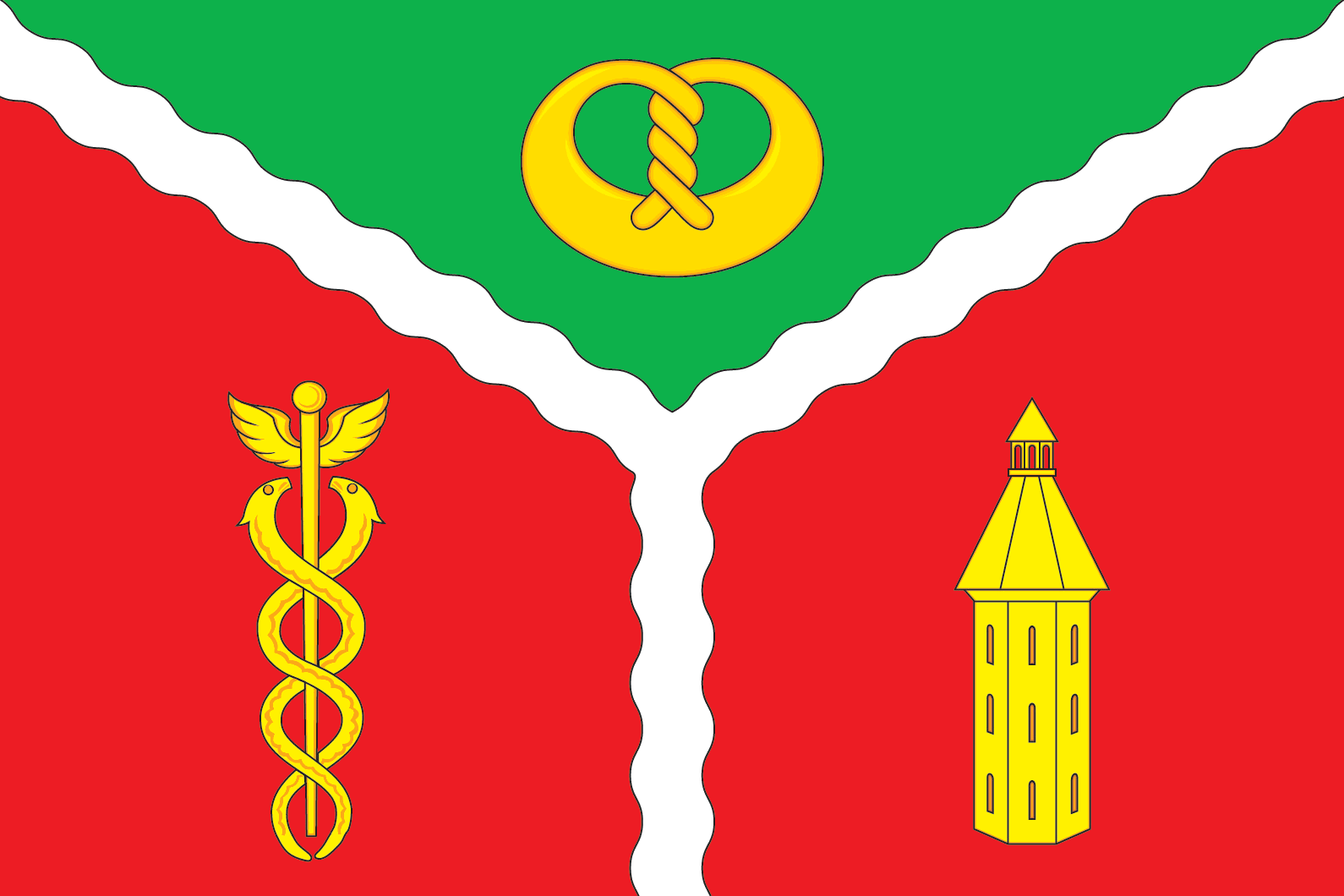
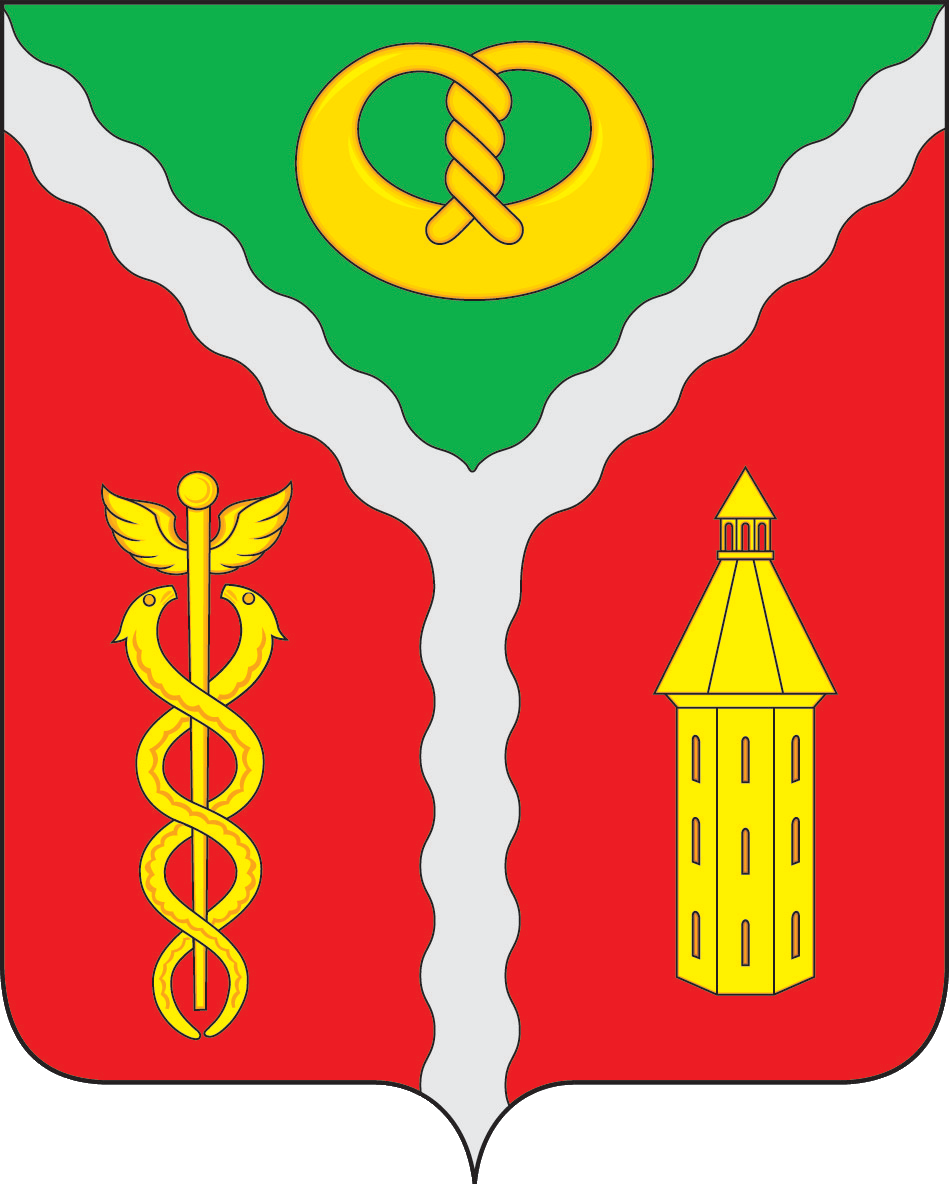
- Flag Coat of arms
- Interactive map of Kalach
- Location of Kalach Kalach (Voronezh Oblast)
- Coordinates: 50°26′N 41°00′E
- Country: Russia
- Federal subject: Voronezh Oblast
- Administrative district: Kalacheyevsky District
- Urban settlementSelsoviet: Kalach
- Founded: 1715
- Town status since: 1945
- Elevation: 90 m (300 ft)

Population (2010 Census)
  - Total: 20,046
  - Estimate (2025): 16,635 (−17%)

Administrative status
  - Capital of: Kalacheyevsky District, Kalach Urban Settlement

Municipal status
  - Municipal district: Kalacheyevsky Municipal District
  - Urban settlement: Kalach Urban Settlement
  - Capital of: Kalacheyevsky Municipal District, Kalach Urban Settlement
- Time zone: UTC+3 (MSK)
- Postal codes: 397600–397602, 397659
- OKTMO ID: 20615101001
- Website: gorod363.ru

Kalach (Russian: Кала́ч) is a town and the administrative center of Kalacheyevsky District in Voronezh Oblast, Russia, located at the confluence of the Tolucheyevka and Podgornaya Rivers, 294 kilometers (183 mi) from Voronezh, the administrative center of the oblast. Population: 20,046 (2010 census); 20,950 (2002 census); 23,183 (1989 Soviet census).

== History ==
It was established in 1716 and granted town status in 1945.

== Administrative and municipal status ==
Within the framework of administrative divisions, Kalach serves as the administrative center of Kalacheyevsky District. As an administrative division, it is, together with seven rural localities in Kalacheyevsky District, incorporated within Kalacheyevsky District as Kalach Urban Settlement. As a municipal division, this administrative unit also has urban settlement status and is a part of Kalacheyevsky Municipal District.
