= Qalat =

Qalat, Qelat, Kalat, Kalaat, Kalut, or Kelat, may refer to:

- Qal'a, a fortified place or fortified village

== Afghanistan ==
- Qalat, Afghanistan, capital of Zabul Province
- Kalat, Badakhshan, a small village in the Kuran wa Munjan District of Badakhshan Province
- Khanate of Kalat, a historical country

== Algeria ==
- Qalat Ibn Salama, a fortress near Tihert (present-day Tiaret)

== Bahrain ==
- Qal'at al-Bahrain, an archaeological site

== Burma ==
- Kalat, Banmauk, Burma

== Indonesia ==
- North Kalimantan, known in Indonesian as Kalimantan Utara and abbreviated to Kalut

== Iran ==
- Kalat, Kangan, Bushehr Province
- Kalat, Tangestan, Bushehr Province
- Kalat, Chaharmahal and Bakhtiari
- Kalat, East Azerbaijan
- Qalat, Bavanat, Fars Province
- Qalat, Jahrom, Fars Province
- Qalat, Evaz, Fars Province
- Qalat, Qir and Karzin, Fars Province
- Qalat, Shiraz, Fars Province
- Kalat, Hormozgan
- Kalut, Iran, Hormozgan Province
- Qalat-e Bala, Hormozgan Province
- Kalat-e Mahmak, Hormozgan Province
- Qalat-e Pain, Hormozgan Province
- Qalat-e Rostam, Hormozgan Province
- Kelat, Ilam
- Qalat, Bahmai, Kohgiluyeh and Boyer-Ahmad Province
- Qalat, Charam, Kohgiluyeh and Boyer-Ahmad Province
- Kalat, Charusa, Kohgiluyeh and Boyer-Ahmad Province
- Kalat, Kohgiluyeh, Kohgiluyeh and Boyer-Ahmad Province
- Kalat, Lorestan
- Kalat, North Khorasan
- Qalat, Qazvin
- Kalat, Gonabad, Razavi Khorasan Province
- Kalat, Razavi Khorasan, in Razavi Khorasan Province
- Kalat, Semnan
- Kalat, Sistan and Baluchestan
- Qalat, Mahabad, West Azerbaijan Province
- Qalat, Naqadeh, West Azerbaijan Province
- Qalat, Piranshahr, West Azerbaijan Province
- Qalat, Zanjan
- Kalat-e Naderi, a natural fortress located north of Sousia in the Kalat, Khorasan region
- Kalat County, a county in Razavi Khorasan Province, Iran

== Iraq ==
- Qalat or Erbil Citadel
- Qelat (Ranya), a subdivision of Ranya, Iraq
- Qalat Sukkar, Dhi Qar Governorate

== Jordan ==
- Qalʻat ar-Rabad, 12th-13th century castle

== Pakistan ==
- Kalat, Pakistan, a town in Balochistan, Pakistan
- Kalat District, a district in Balochistan, Pakistan
- Kalat Tehsil, a tehsil in Kalat district in Balochistan, Pakistan
- Khanate of Kalat, former princely state in Balochistan, Pakistan

== Saudi Arabia ==
- Qalat Bishah

== Syria (Golan Heights) ==
- Qal'at as-Subeiba or Nimrod's Castle, medieval (Ayyubid and Mamluk) fortress in Israeli-occupied Golan Heights

== Tunisia ==
- Kalaat es Senam

== Other uses ==
- Kelat (ship)

== See also ==
- Kala (disambiguation), the Persian alternate spelling of Arabic qal'a
- Qala (disambiguation) or qal'a, the Arabic word for fortress or castle
- Qal'a
- Qila (disambiguation), the Persian (Urdu, Hindi) variant of Arabic qal'a
