= Qila =

Fort or castle

Qila (Arabic: قلعة), alternatively transliterated as Kilā, is an Arabic word meaning a fort or castle. The term is also used in various Indo-Iranian languages. Qila often occurs in place-names.

== India ==
Forts

- Aligarh Qila
- Rohtas Qila
- Allahabad Qila
- Chittorgarh Qila
- Gohad Qila
- Hatras Qila
- Lal Qila (Agra)
- Lal Qila - literally Red Fort in Delhi, India
- Purana Qila, Delhi
- Qila Rai Pithora, Delhi, established 12th-century
- Qila Mubarak
- Sasni Qila
- Shahi Qila, Jaunpur

Place-names

- Qila Raipur

== Pakistan ==
Forts

- Shahi Qila, Lahore

Place-names

- Arkot Qila
- Azim Qila
- Besham Qila
- Hisara Kasan Ali Qila
- Hisara Sarbiland Khan Qila
- Khuni Qila
- Mughal Qila
- Sakhakot Qila in Malakand Agency
- Sāsoli Qila
- Qila Didar Singh
- Qila Ladgasht
- Qila Mihan Singh
- Qila Safed
- Qila Saifullah in Balochistan
- Qila Sheikhupura
- Qila Tara Singh
- Qila Sobha Singh
- Qila Sura Singh

== Other ==
- Qila, Hebron, Palestinian territories
- Lalbagh kella,Dhaka, Bangladesh
- Qila, Ordinals, BRC-20 cryptocurrency token

== See also ==
- Kala (disambiguation), alternate spelling of qala ("fortress") in Persian
- Qala (disambiguation), alternate spelling of qala ("fortress")
- Qalat (disambiguation), disambiguation page for places whose names contain the words Qalat, Qelat, Kalat, Kalaat, Kalut, or Kelat
