= Qila (disambiguation) =

Qila a Persian, Urdu, and Hindi word meaning a fort or castle used in names of places.

Qila may also refer to:

- Qila, Hebron, a village in Palestine
- Qila (film), a 1998 Bollywood Hindi language drama film

== See also ==
- Kala (disambiguation), Persian alternate spelling of Arabic qal'a
- Qala (disambiguation) or qal'a, Arabic word for fortress or castle
- Qalat (disambiguation), places whose names contain the words Qalat, Qelat, Kalat, Kalaat, Kalut, or Kelat
- Qalat (fortress)
