= Qal'a =

Type of castle

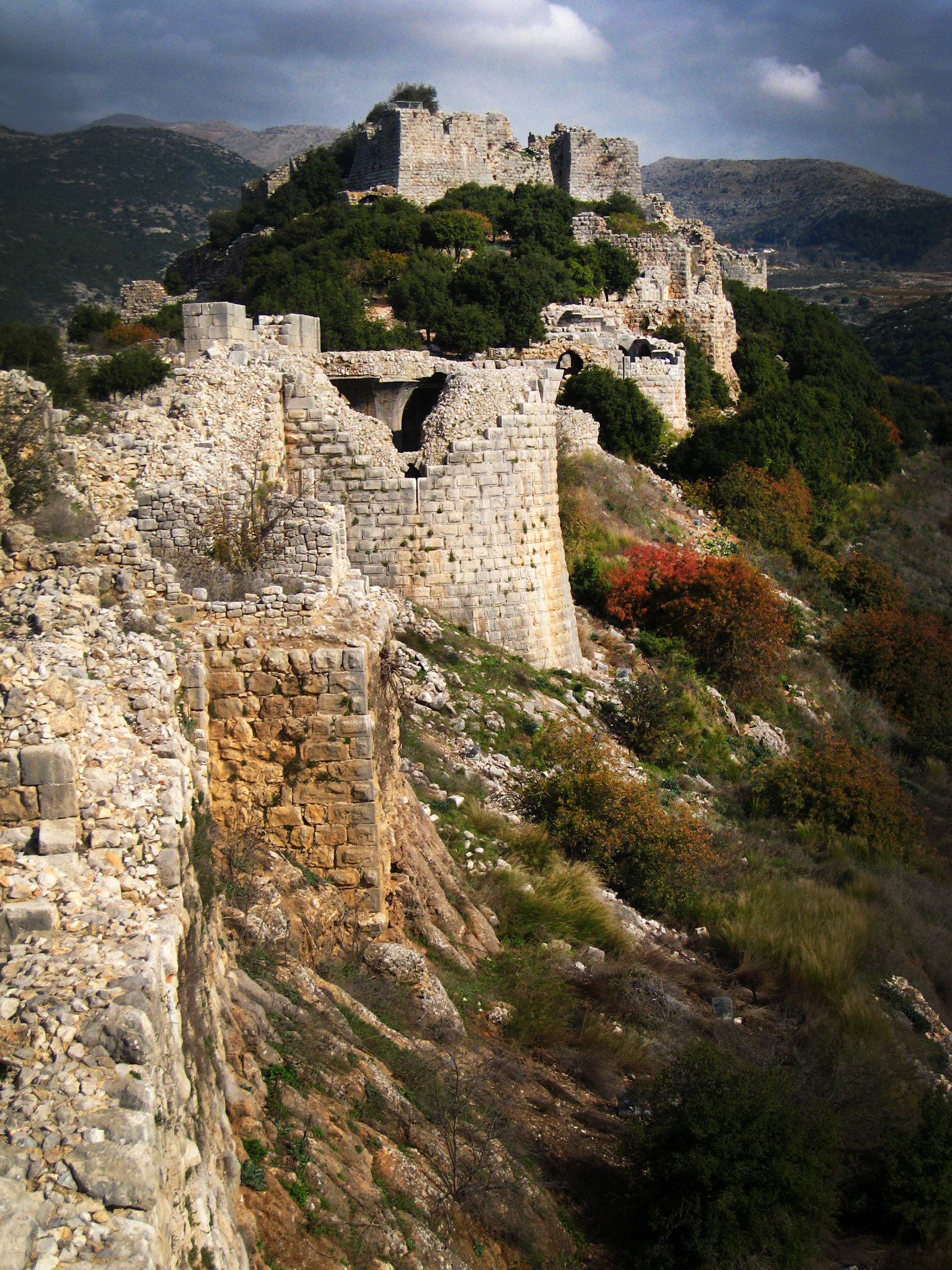
Qal'at as-Subeiba, Golan Heights

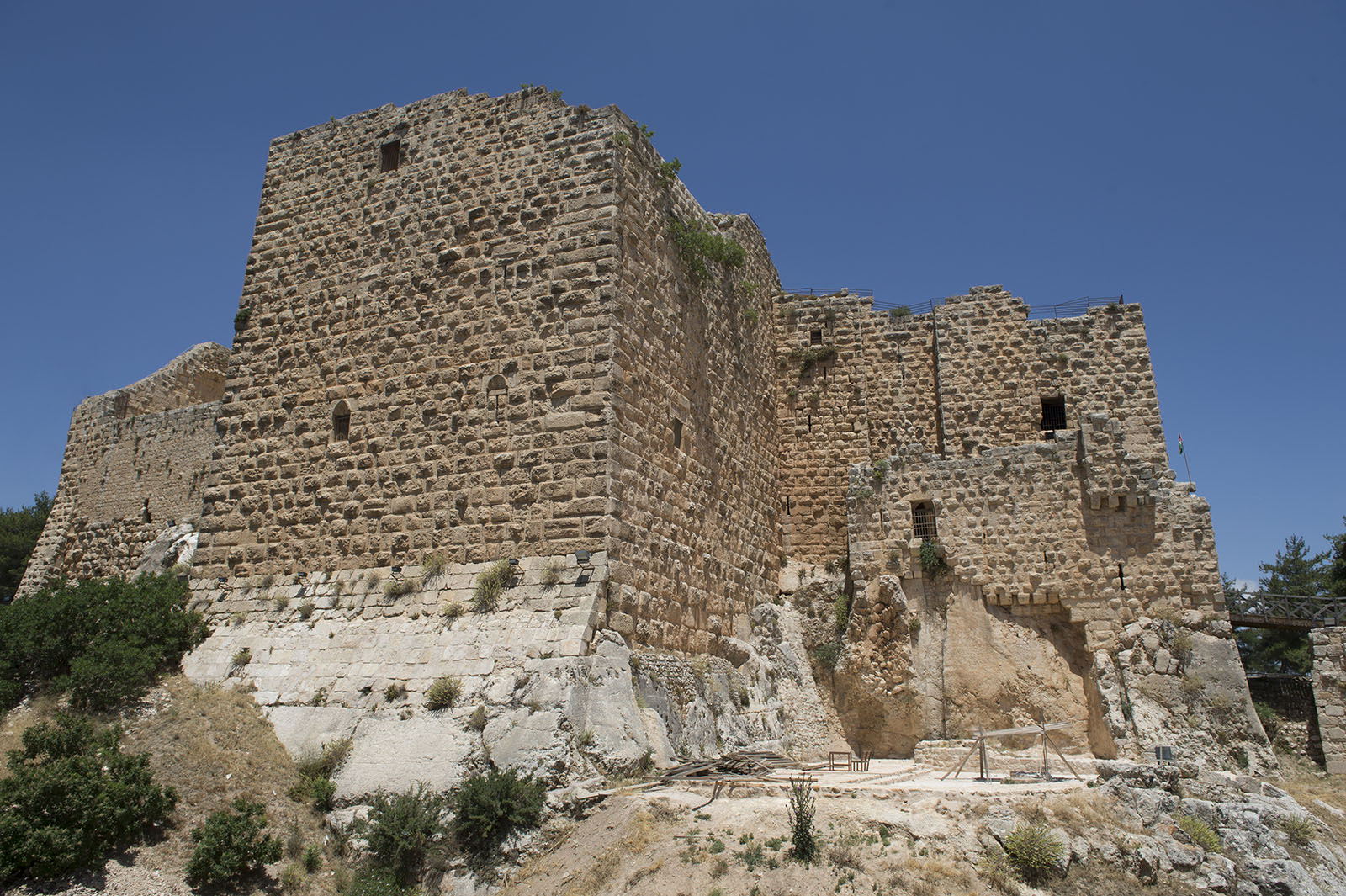
Qalʻat ar-Rabad (12th-13th century) in Jordan

These two qal'as were built by the Ayyubids and expanded by the Mamluks to help in the fight against the Crusaders, to subdue local tribes, and to control rival emirs.

Qalʿa (Note: Less commonly qilʿa in Arabic.) (Arabic: قلعة; construct state: qalʿat), (Note: Arabic plural: قلاع qilāʿ or قلوع qulūʿ.: Classical Persian: قلعه, romanized: qalʿa; Iranian Persian: قلعه, romanized: qalʿe; Azerbaijani: qala; Ottoman Turkish: قلعه, romanized: ḳalʿa, ḳalʿe; Turkish: kale; Urdu: قلعہ, romanized: qilʿa; Uzbek: qalʼa) also called kalāta (کلاته) in Classical Persian, means 'fortress', 'fortification', 'castle', or simply 'fortified place'.

Qal'as can range from forts like Rumkale to the mud-brick compound common throughout West Asia. The term is used in the entire Muslim world to indicate a defensive fortress. The term took various forms in different languages, such as qalʿa (Arabic and Classical Persian), kale (Turkish), kaleh and kalleh (Iranian Persian), qila (Urdu and Hindi), and often became part of place-names. It is even preserved in toponyms in places such as Sicily, which was occupied by the Aghlabid dynasty and then the Fatimids from the ninth to the twelfth centuries.

The word is used in various Arabic placenames.

== Etymology ==
Wolf Leslau (1987), citing Siegmund Fraenkel (1886) and Walter Belardi (1959), offers that the Arabic word has been adopted from the Classical Persian kalata.

The Etymological Dictionary of Contemporary Turkish written by Armenian-Turkish author Sevan Nişanyan states that the Turkish word kale is adapted from ḳalˁa(t), which originates from the Arabic root ḳlˁ. Nişanyan goes on to note that the Arabic word shares its origin with the Middle Persian variant kalak, which has no written record and originates in the Akkadian word of the same meaning kalakku.

=== Classical Persian ===
The Classical Persian word is کلاته (kalāta).

=== Armenian ===
The Armenian word is preserved as kałak (kaghak) which means city.

=== Arabic ===
The Arabic word takes the forms qal'a(-t) and qil'a(-t), plural qilâ' and qulû' , meaning fortress, fortification, or castle.

== Middle East ==
See the lists of castles from Saudi Arabia, Jordan (Qalʻat ar-Rabad, Qal'at al-Karak and Qal'at ash-Shawbak), Tal Afar in Iraq, the castles of Syria, Lebanon, Egypt, etc.

== Central Asian fortified city ==
A typical qala in Central Asia consisted of a tripartite city model: kuhandiz (citadel), shahristan (residential area), and rabad (faubourg, suburb; the regional variant for rabat). This city model is valid not only for Central Asian city typology and is also used to describe similar city types elsewhere in Islamic geography.

=== Kuhandiz (citadel) ===
In the pre-Islamic Iran and Turkestan towns consisted of a fortress called diz (also means "fortress" in Persian), and the actual town which was called shahristan. Middle Eastern Islamic geographers use the word kuhandiz for the oldest part of the settlements in the town centers. It later started to be used in with the meaning of citadel. The word kuhandiz originates from Persian (كهندز) and means literally "old fortress". But the word kuhandiz can't be applied to solitary fortresses which were independent of towns, as it would cause conceptual confusion. Although in Arabic the word hisn or husûn (حصون. ج - حص) was used to indicate fortresses which were located off towns, since Arabic terms did not have proper meaning to describe those structures, they borrowed the word kuhandiz during the Islamic conquest of Iran. Kuhandizes were usually built on high ground and were the last line of defence in the town. Administrative units were mostly located here. The Turkish term iç kale and the English "citadel" are synonymous.

=== Shahristan (residential area) ===
Shahristan is a combination of two words, šahr (city) and -stan/-istan (region, area), thus it literally means "city area". Before the Islamic conquest of Central Asia, castle-style settlements were common rather than large political and economic centers. The word used by Muslim Arabs for these fortified towns, which were protected by walls, is qal'a. As the feudal system was transcended, this tripartite city model appeared with castle-like structures, which are called kuhandiz, forming the core of the city. With the development in itself of the settlement within the old walls, cities without kuhandizes also appeared. Most of the townspeople dwelled in the shahristan. Mesut Can states that this might be the reason the name shahristan was used. Most of the buildings for recreation and worship were also located there.

== Qala compounds in Iran and Afghanistan ==
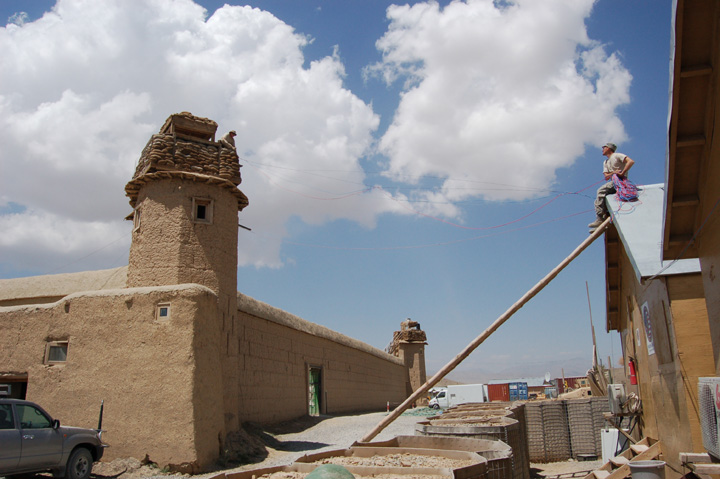
A qalat in southeastern Afghanistan used by American soldiers.

In many areas of Iran and Afghanistan, particularly in tribal areas with pre-modern building practices, the qalat compound is the standard housing unit for multi-generational families. Qalats can be quickly constructed over the course of a single season, and they can be extremely large, sometimes covering several acres. Towers may be placed at the corners or points along the walls to create a more defensible position, but most qala compounds consist only of the walls.

While the foundation of a qala compound may be stone or fired brick, the walls are typically dried mud. Walls are created by laying down a row of adobe bricks with mud mortar along the entire length of the wall. By the time that the mason returns to the point of origin, the mortar is dry and the next row can be added on top of the old. Using this technique walls dozens of feet high can be built very rapidly.

== Pakistan ==
Khanate of Kalat was a major state in the southwest Pakistan that derived its name from the fortified city of Kalat in the modern day's province of Balochistan.

== Turkey ==
=== Kale ===
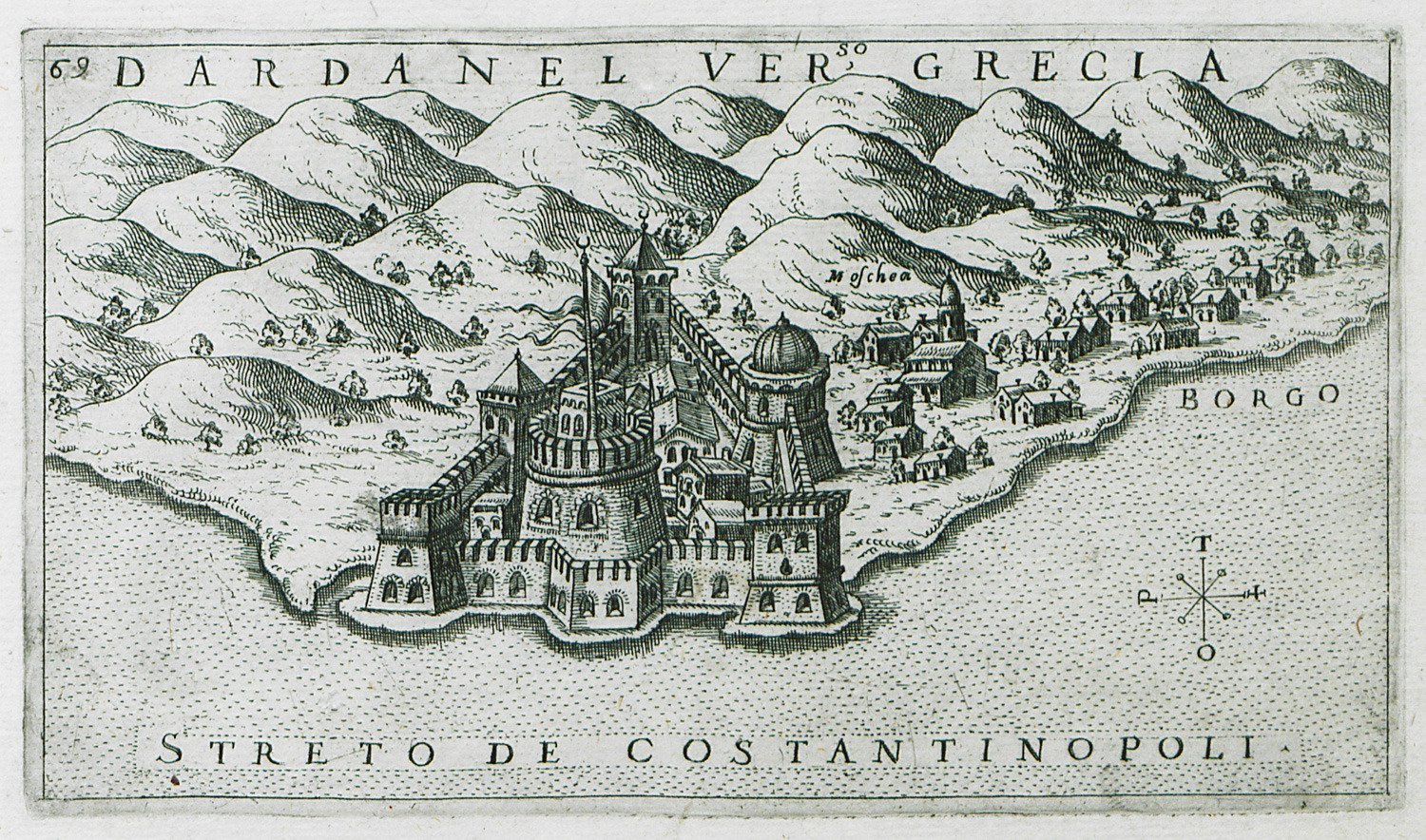
Kilitbahir Kalesi, on the European coast of the Dardanelles.

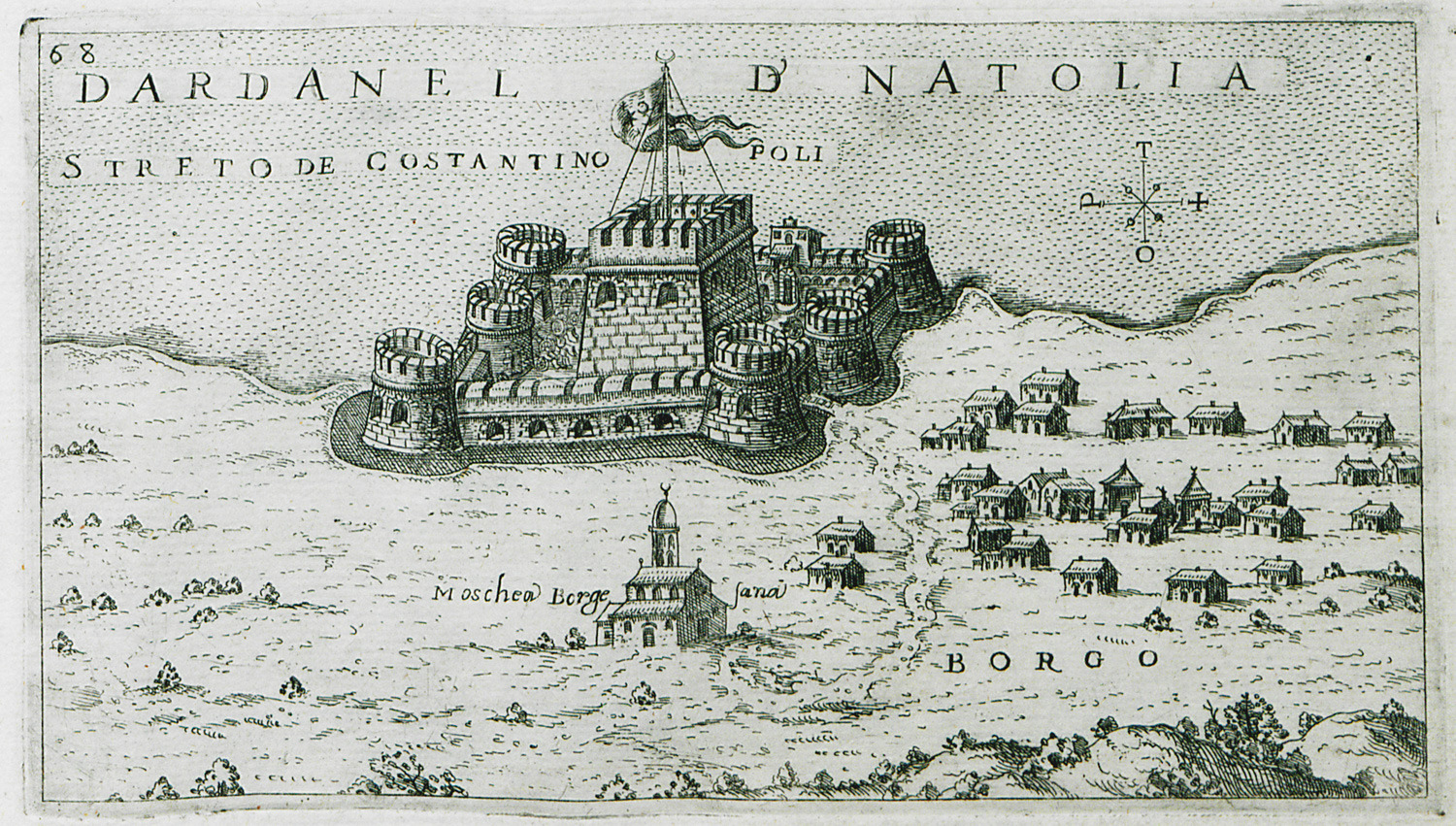
Kale-i Sultaniye, on the Asian coast of the Dardanelles.
Together the two castles, built in 1452 by orders from Mehmed the Conqueror, were protecting the Dardanelles.

In modern Turkish, kale (Turkish pronunciation: [ka'le]) is an umbrella term that encompasses all types of fortified structures.

In Turkish, the scope of the term kale can vary. Today many fortified buildings are called kale, which causes confusion. Originally the word kale (or kal'a قلعە in Ottoman Turkish) refers to fortresses which were built on roads, at narrow passes, and at bottlenecks, where the enemy was expected to pass by, or in cities with strategic value. Building materials of kales could differ according to geographical conditions. For example, Ottoman palankas were mostly built of wooden palisades.

A typical kale has the same features known from Western and Eastern counterparts, such as curtain walls with towers and a gatehouse, an inner tower similar to a keep (bâlâhisar, erk or başkule in Turkish), battlements and embrasures, a moat and sometimes postern gates. In the 15th century, the Greek word for tower, purgos, was adopted into Turkish as burgaz.

Ottoman towns in the Balkans and Anatolia had a tripartite city model: old castle (inner fortress), varoş (residential area, in modern Turkish used as 'suburb'), and outer city (suburb).

=== Kale vs hisar, kermen ===
There are also other similar terms such as hisar or kermen.

The definition of the term hisar is similar to that of castle, a fortified structure that acts as a residence, such as Rumelihisarı or Anadoluhisarı. The word originates in Arabic, where it means 'fortress' and 'blockade', and from where it also made it into Persian as hessar.

Another word used for forts is kermen, which originates from Cuman. It is known as kirmen in Tatar, and as karman in Chuvash. The Russian word kremlin also originates from kermen.

When toponymically examined, it can be seen that hisar is used for place-names in western Turkey, kale in eastern Turkey, and kermen in the Crimean peninsula.

== See also ==
- Kala (disambiguation)—Persian alternate spelling of Arabic qal'a
- Qala (disambiguation) or qal'a—Arabic word for fortress or castle
- Qalat (disambiguation)—Places whose names contain the words Qalat, Qelat, Kalat, Kalaat, Kalut, or Kelat
- Qila (disambiguation)—Persian (Urdu, Hindi) variant of Arabic qal'a
