= Barquq Castle =

Caravanserai in Khan Yunis, Gaza Strip

- قلعة برقوق
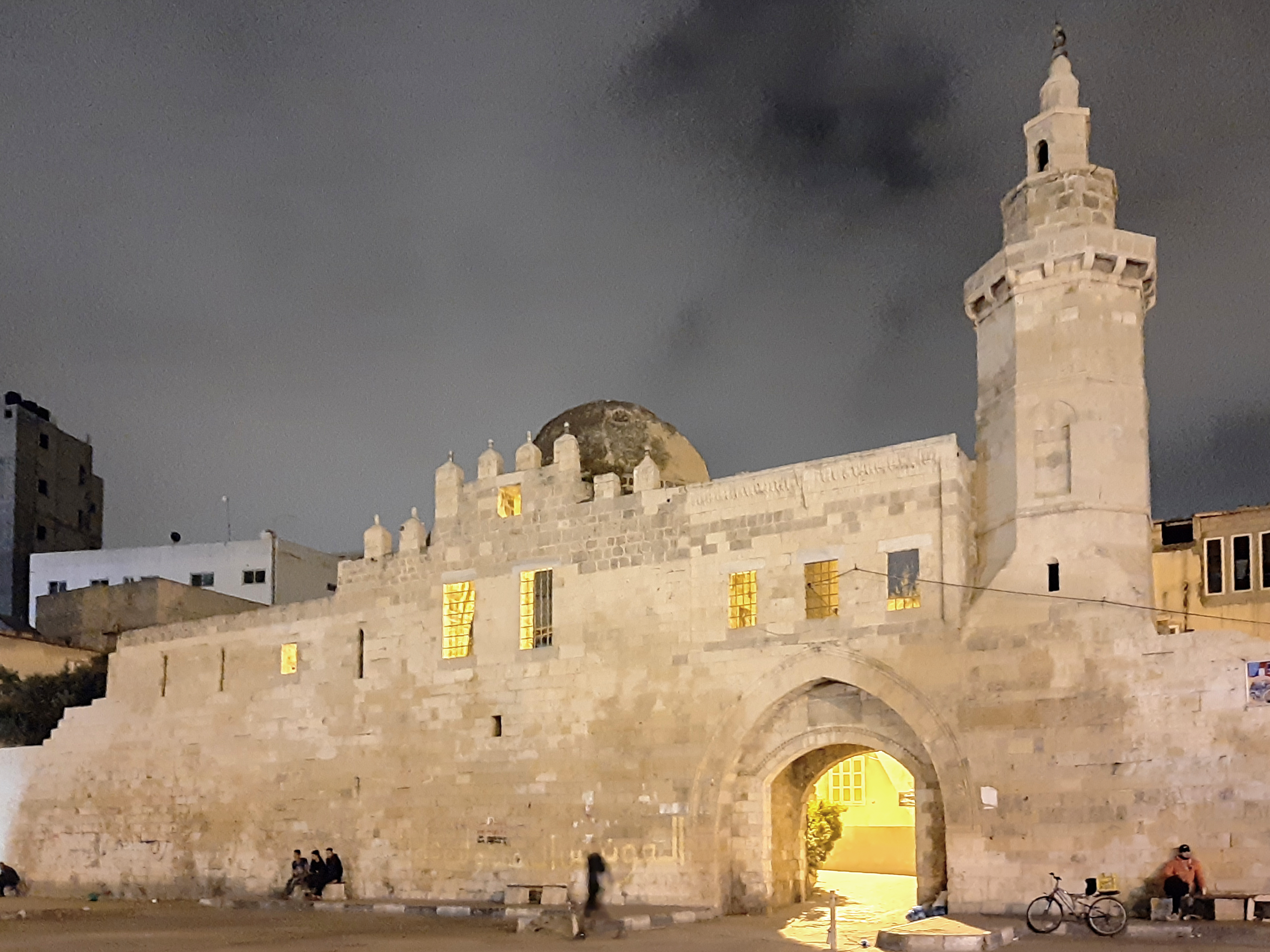
- The castle in 2020
- Interactive map of the Barquq Castle area
- Alternative names: Caravanserai of Yūnus al-Dawādār, or simply Khan Yunis

General information
- Type: Caravanserai, Castle
- Architectural style: Mamluk
- Location: Khan Yunis, Gaza Strip
- Coordinates: 31°20′36″N 34°18′12″E
- Completed: 1387
- Destroyed: 2024

Barquq Castle (Arabic: قلعة برقوق, romanized: Qalʿat Barqūq), also known as the Younis al-Nuruzi Caravansari or simply Khan Younis, was a Mamluk-era fortified mosque and caravanserai. It was one of the most important Mamluk strongholds in the region. The city of Khan Yunis in the Gaza Strip takes its name from this building, which is 20 kilometres (12 mi) from the Egypt–Gaza border. It lies along the historical road from Cairo to Damascus, known as the Via Maris. It was damaged by the Israeli army during the Gaza war.

== History ==
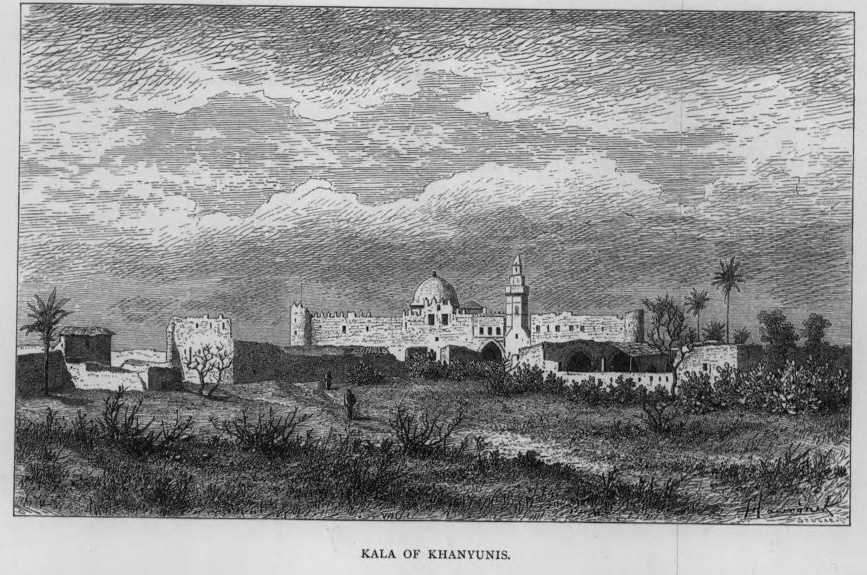
In 1881

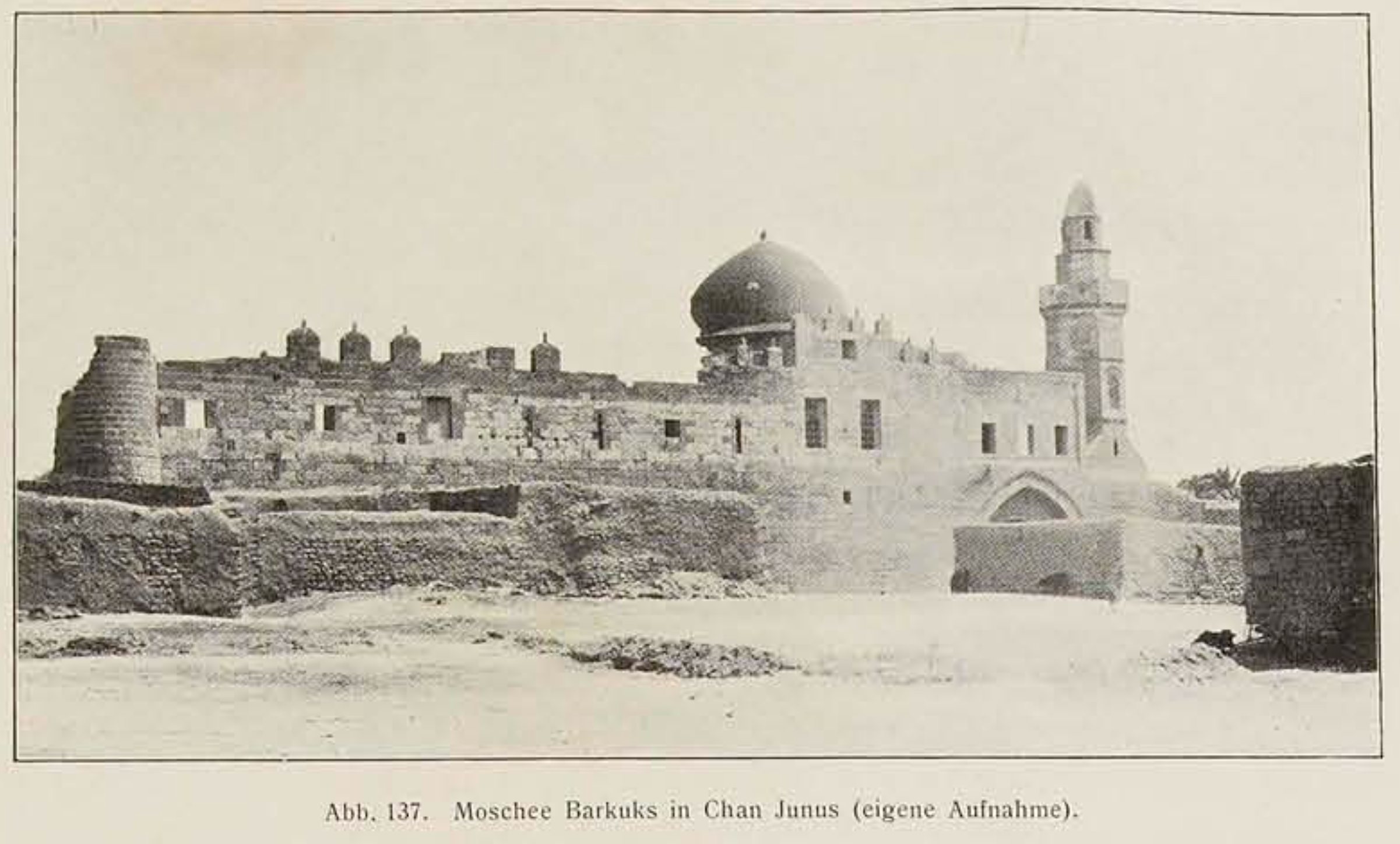
In the early 1900s

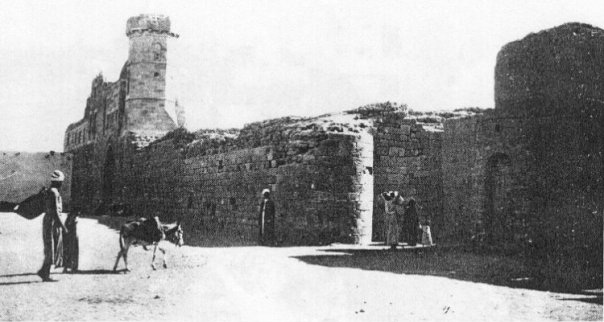
In the 1930s

=== Construction ===
An Arabic inscription above the entrance states that the building was constructed in 1387–1388 by Yunis al-Nawruzi, a dawadar of the Mamluk Circassian sultan Barquq. Both Yunus and Barquq are named in three Arabic inscriptions above the building's main gateway, and the building's two common names – Barquq Castle and Khan Yunis – are thus thought to derive from their names. Others have claimed that the latter refers to the prophet Jonah (also Yunis in Arabic). The word castle in the name is a translation of the Arabic word qal'a, meaning fortified building, whereas khan is another word for caravanserai and refers to its initial use as a place for travelling merchants.

=== Mamluk and Ottoman periods ===
It was built as a caravanserai to serve as a center in the middle of the road between Damascus and Cairo, the two largest cities in the Mamluk Sultanate, to protect merchant caravans, pilgrims and travellers. The khan also served as resting stop for couriers of the barid, the Mamluk postal network in Palestine and Syria.

During the 17th and 18th centuries the Ottomans assigned an Asappes garrison associated with the Cairo Citadel to guard the fortress.

It was visited in 1863 by French explorer Victor Guérin, who described it as follows:

[…] apart from the western facade and some parts of the perimeter wall, this castle is now very degraded and completely falls into ruin. It formed a large square, flanked, at its four angles, by a round half-turn. A mosque, still quite well preserved, bears the name of Jamia Sultan Barquq; it is decorated inside, and in particular the pulpit to preach or member, placed near the mihrab, with quite beautiful pieces of gray-white marble, coming, according to all appearances, from old buildings. The other materials that were used to build this mosque as well as the rest of the castle must also be partly antique; but they have been diminished. The inside of the fortress is currently occupied by very dilapidated private dwellings. It was once preceded by another larger enclosure, also flanked by towers, which is three-quarters demolished.

Gottlieb Schumacher visited it in 1886:

[…] the fine minaret and mosque, together with the ancient Khân building erected by Sultân Barkûk, built in the Arabic style of architecture, of sandstone and marble, with fair architectural details. The whole building has a length of 237 feet, and a width of 38 feet at the gate, and was flanked on each of its four corners by a round tower; a large wing added to the southern end is fallen. The "Khân" had two stories, the lower being the Khân itself, the upper evidently rooms for guests with the Jâma'. The main entrance facing west is spanned by a pointed arch, and in its bay a second gate with a segmental arch was constructed. The entrance is ornamented with lion figures, Kor'an citations and arabesques, above which on each side of the gate the name of "Sultan Barkûk" and a dedication to him is engraved. The entablature of the second story ended in a sort of ridge flower. To the right of the entrance a stairway leads to the Minaret, an octagon with an upper panel of later date, and to the left some passage must have led to the beautiful cupola spanned over the Jâma'... The cupola has a height of 24 feet, and is spanned over a room of 17 feet square; its layers run in concentrical rows, the stones being exactly worked; just the eastern half of this fine cupola is fallen. In the eastern wall a neat little pulpit of pure white marble and moresque work, with marble stairs leading up to it, is yet preserved.

=== Modern period ===
Dimitri Baramki wrote a study on the building entitled "Report on Khan Yunus" in the 1930s, which was held in the archive of the Palestine Archaeological Museum (today the Rockefeller Archeological Museum).

External videos
- Video showing some of the damage to Barquq Castle in 2024
- "Palestinian mourns history as Israel destroys archaeological sites in Gaza", from Xinhua

By the mid 20th century, much of the building was in ruins, but the front façade, gateway and mosque with its minaret were still standing.

During the Israeli invasion of the Gaza Strip, hundreds of historic sites were damaged or destroyed. The ongoing nature of the conflict makes it difficult to visit sites and evaluate damage and in January 2024 the status of the site was unknown; the following month +972 Magazine reported that Barquq Castle had been damaged when the area was attacked. The Israeli news site Ynet also reported damage to the Castle. The historic centre of Khan Yunis was more severely targeted than in previous conflicts, and as a result significant damage was caused to historic sites including Barquq Castle. UNESCO is evaluating the impact of the conflict on cultural heritage sites using remote analysis; they included Barquq amongst 157 sites with verified damage as of February 2026.

== Area ==
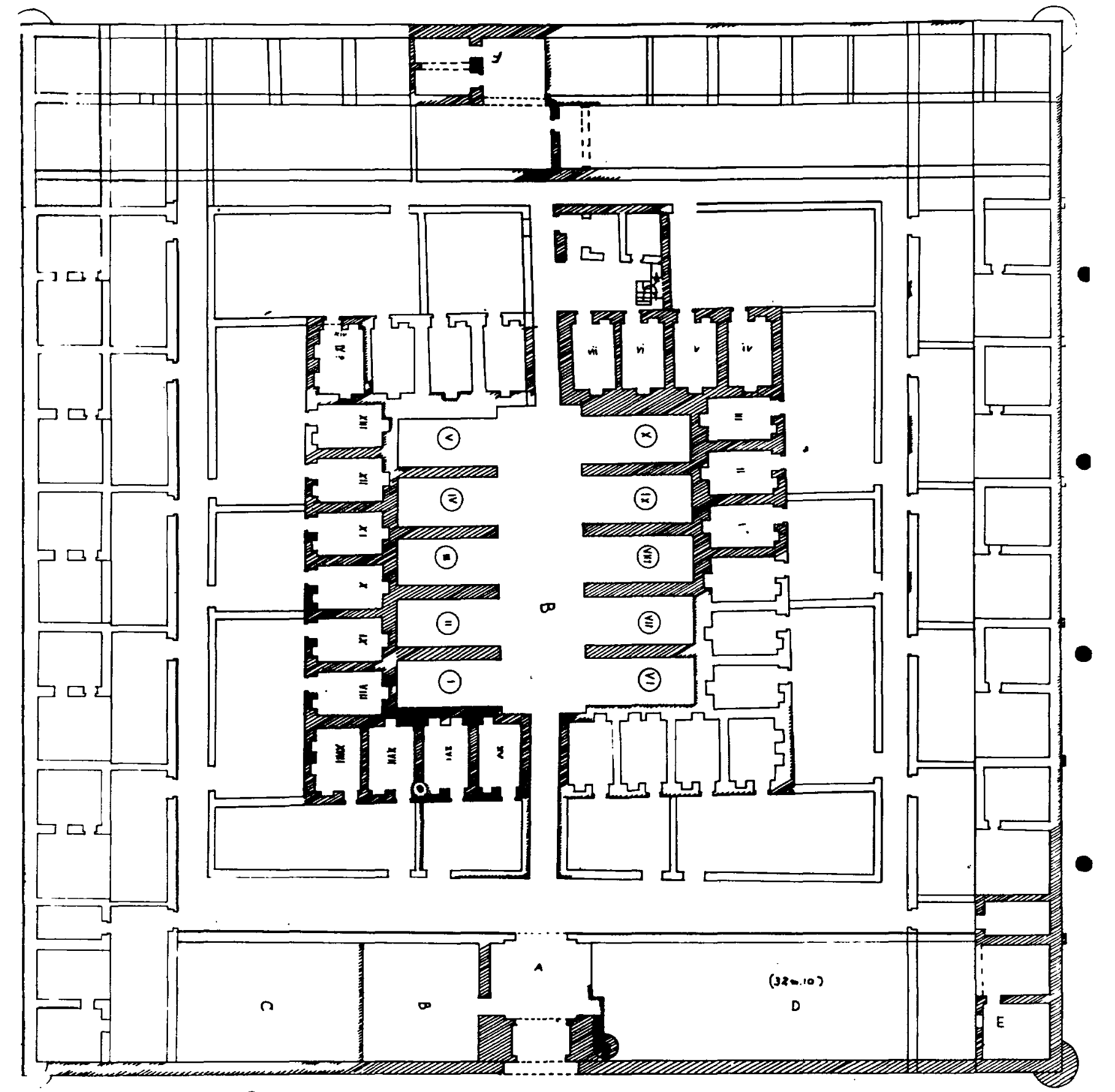
Dmitri Baramki's sketch of the remains in the 1930s

The castle was initially square, with sides measuring about 80 metres (260 ft) and covering an area of 6,400 square metres (69,000 sq ft). Each corner had a round tower. The main entrance was in the north-west facing facade.

The castle consists of two floors and a mosque for prayer.

== Gallery ==
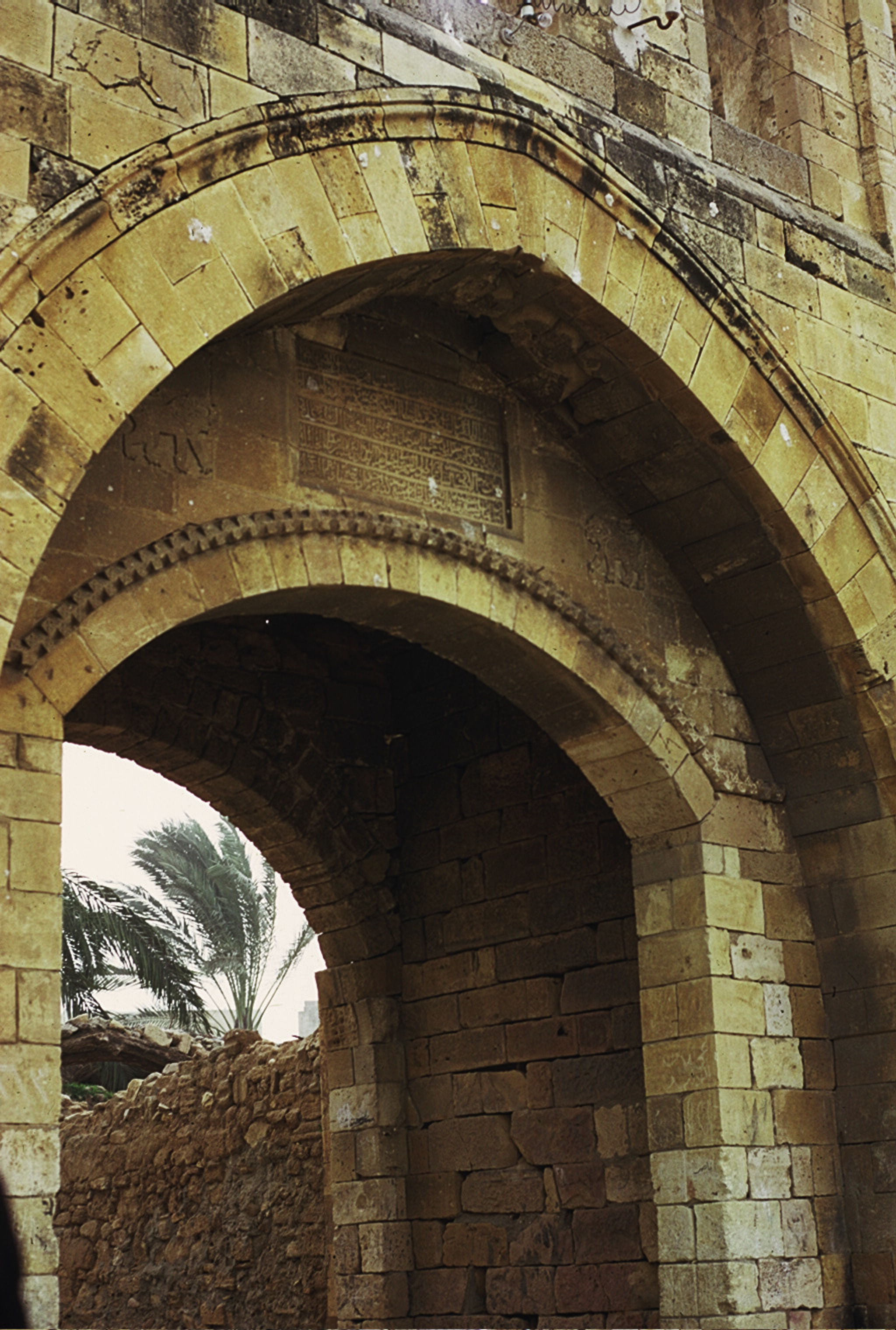
The entrance on the south-east façade with an inscription above

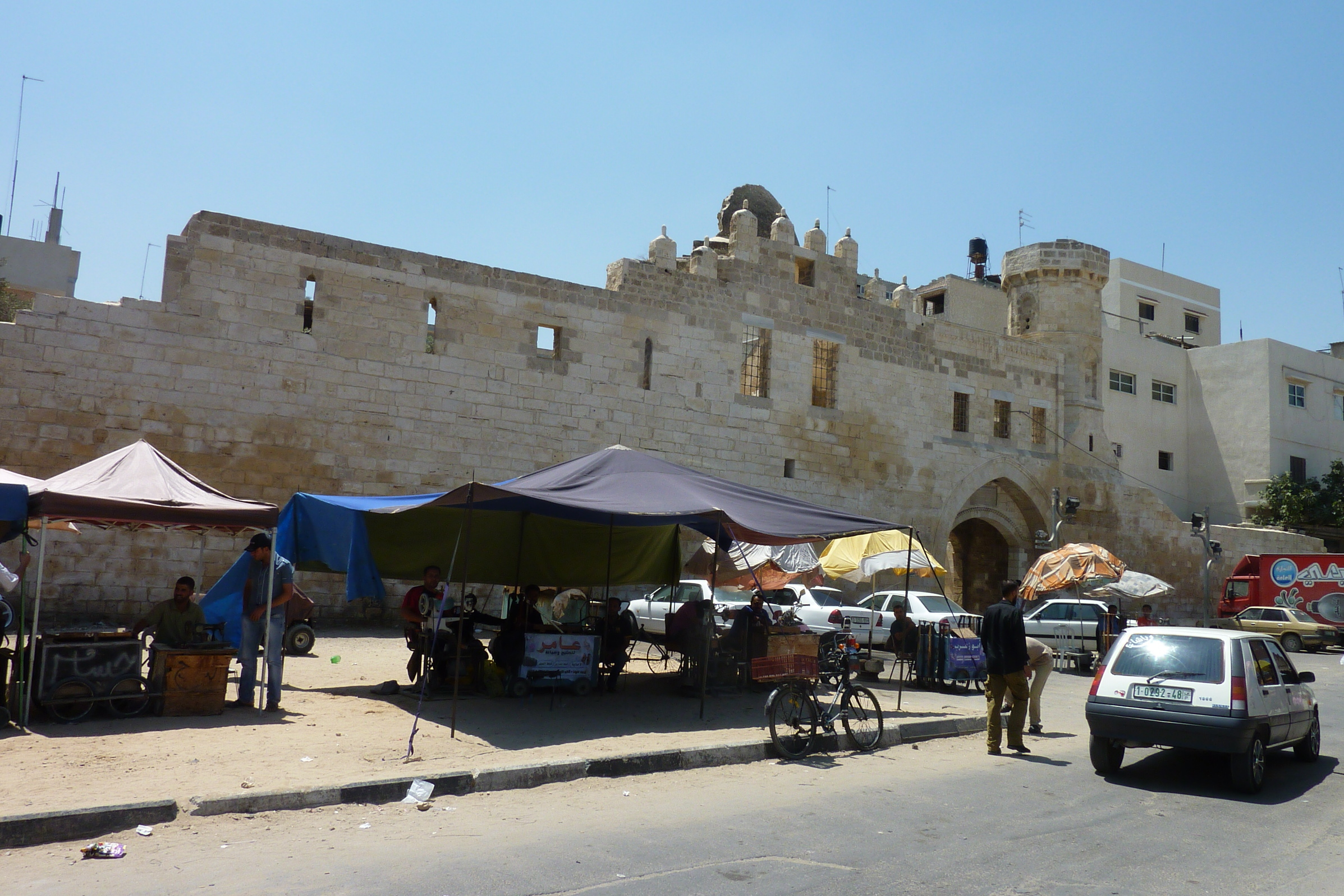
The south-east façade viewed from the south

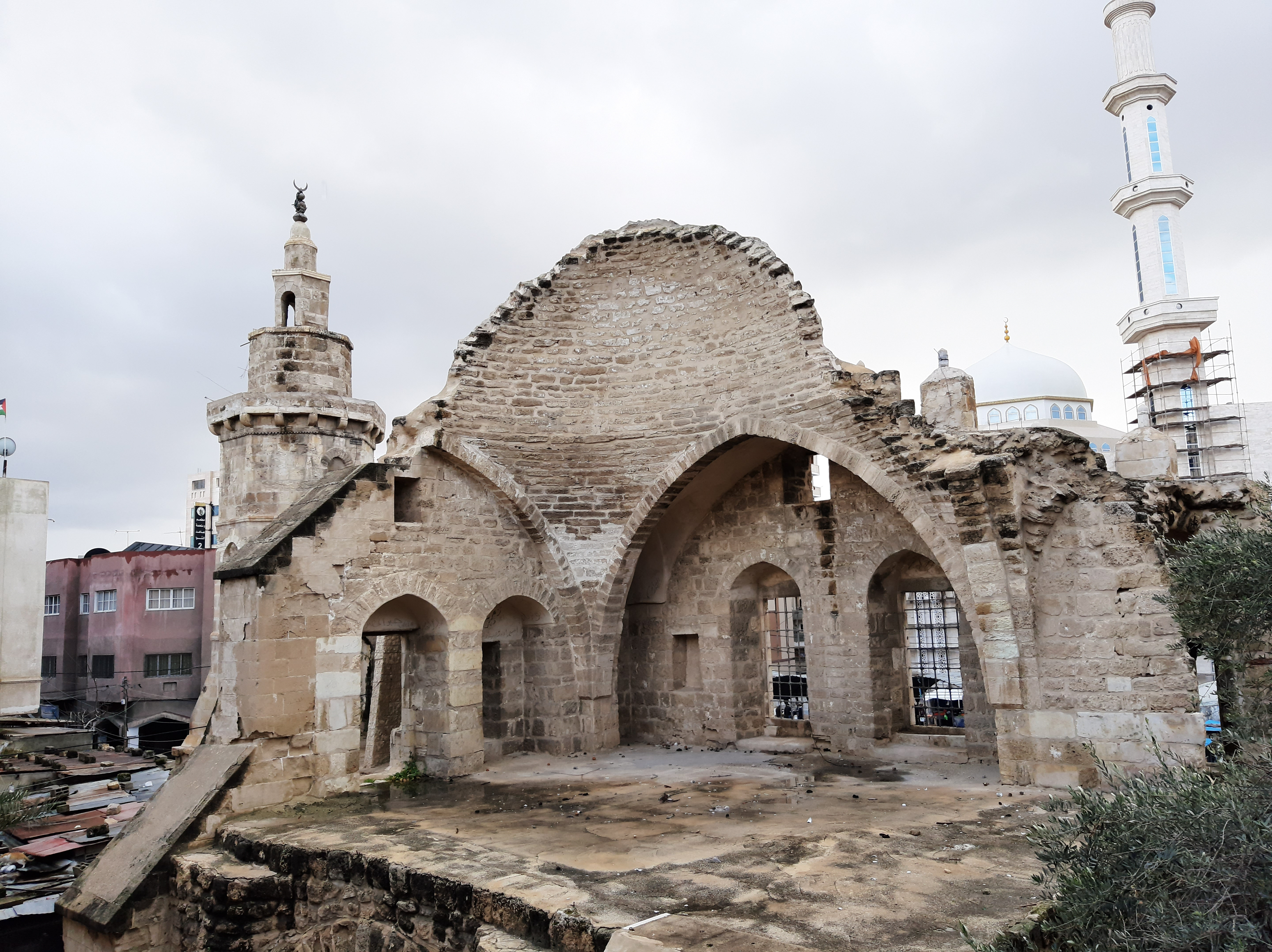

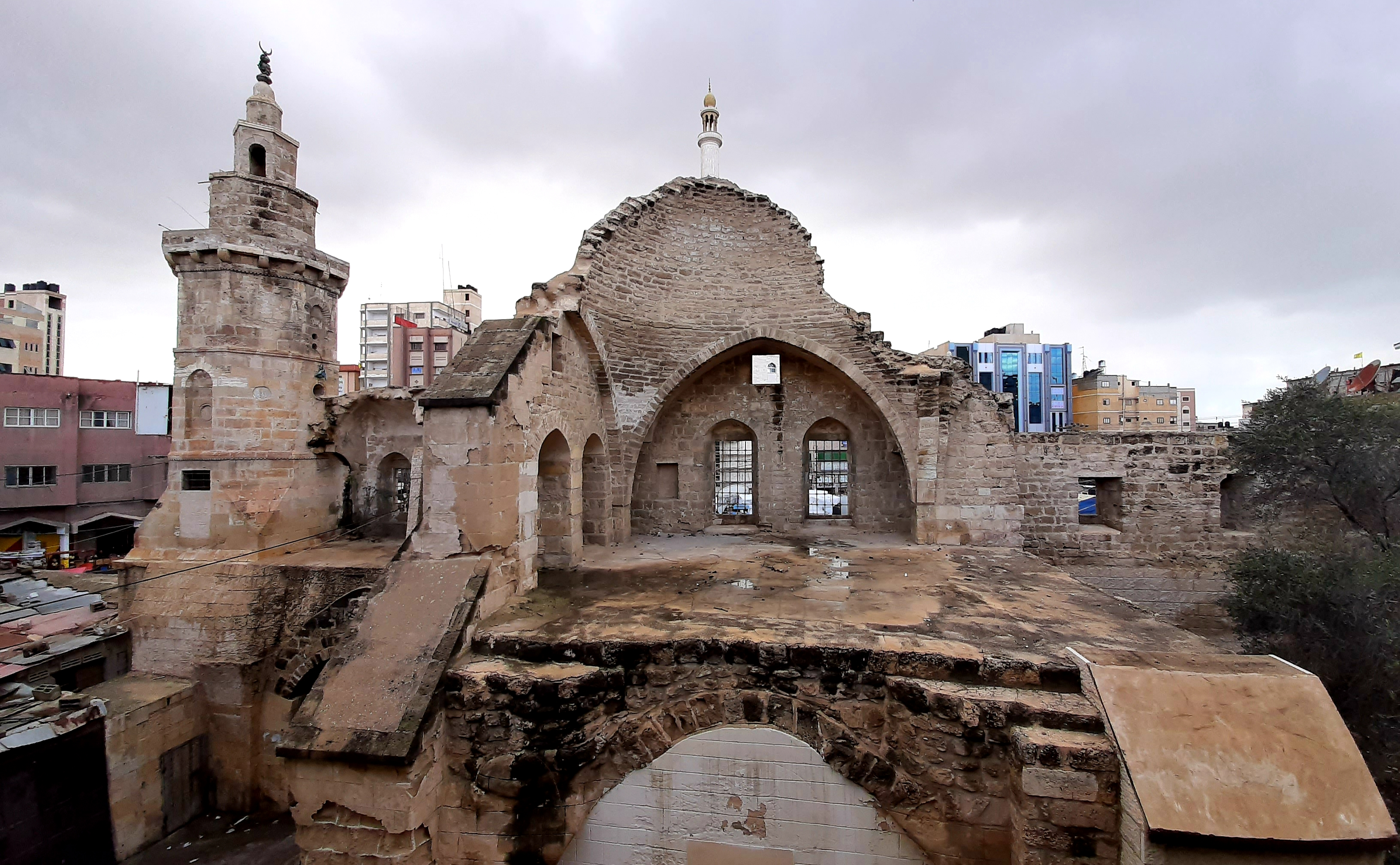

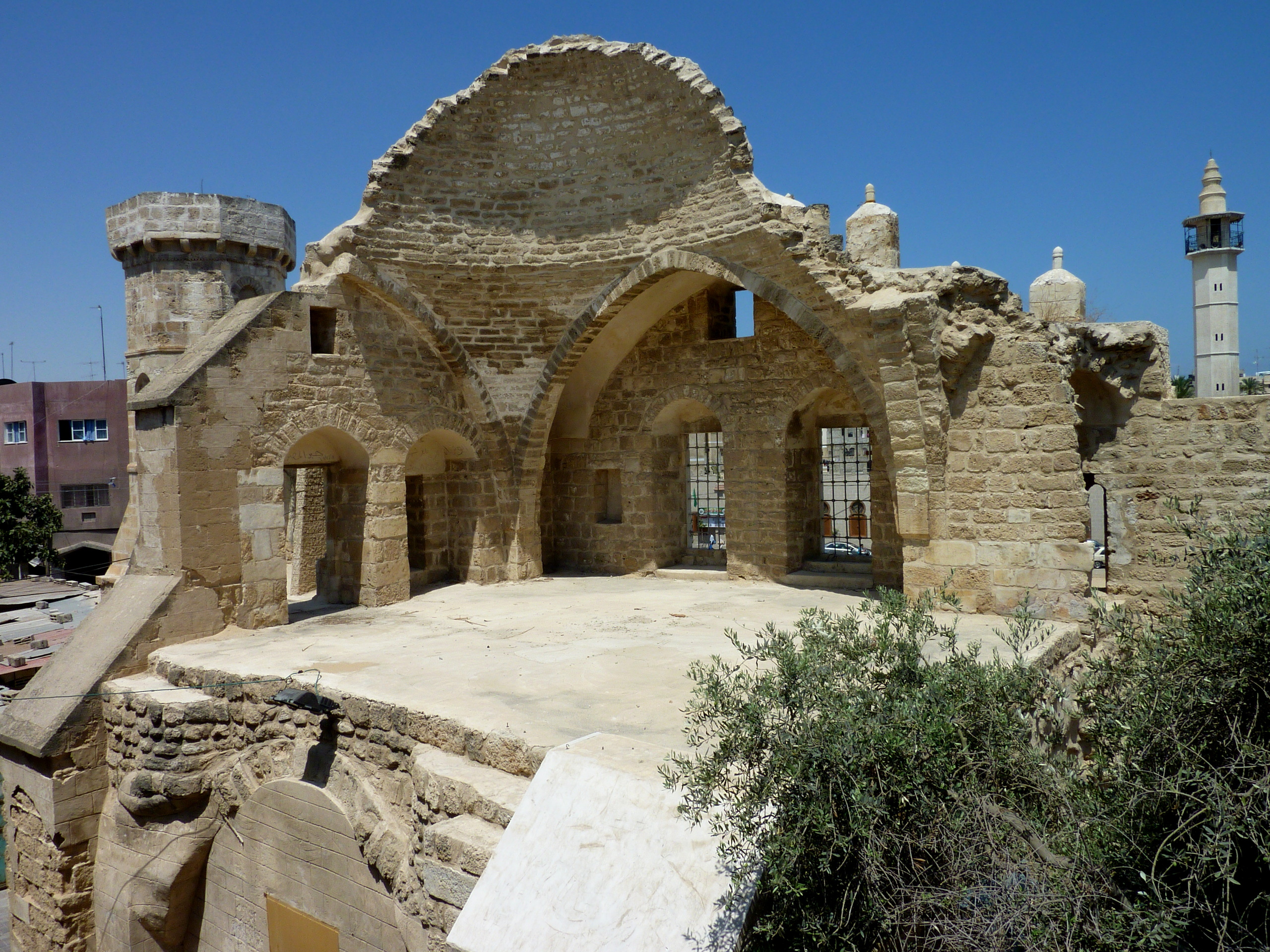

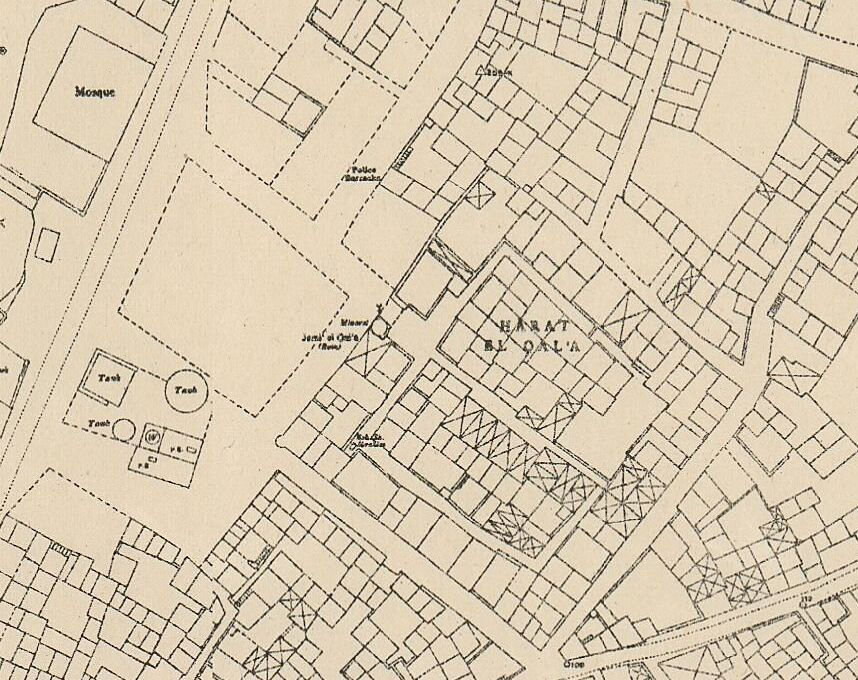
Survey of Palestine map, 1940, showing "Harat el Qala" ('Castle Quarter')

== Inscriptions ==
Location	Images	Summary	Arabic	Translation
Left and right side of the gateway, with blazons above	An inscription	Name of the Sultan during whose reign the Khan was built	بسم الله الرحمن الرحيم ذلك فضل الله يؤتيه من يشاء والله ذو الفضل العظيم أنشأ هذا الخان في أيام سيدنا ومولانا السلطان الملك الظاهر سيف الدنيا والدين ابي سعيد برقوق خلد الله سلطانه وشد بالصالحات أركانه.أوقفه المقر الشريف العالي المولوي الاميري الزعيمي السفيري الشرفي ظهير الملوك والسلاطين والفقراء والمساكين أمير المؤمنين التقي يونس النوروزي الدوادار مولانا السلطان الملك الظاهري أعز الله تعالى أنصاره وضاعف جزاءه	In the name of the most merciful God. This is the free grace of God, he bestoweth it on whom he pleaseth and God is endued with great beneficence. This public caravanserai was founded in the days of our lord, And master the sultan al-Malik az-Zahir Saif ad-Dunya wa'd-Din Abi Sa'id Barquq, may God make his sultanate eternal and keep him firmly established in good works, And was made a waqf by his noble and high excellency our lord, the Amir, the chieftain, the envoy, Sharaf ad-Din, protector of kings and sultans, known for his love for the poor, The pious Amir Yunis an-Nawruzi, the Dawadar of our lord the sultan al-Malik az-Zahir, may God the exalted make his victories glorious and multiply his reward"Blazons: upper field "Barquq", middle field, "Azza li-Mawlana As-Sultan Al-Malik Az-Zahir", lower field "Azza-Nasruh".
Top of the gateway in the tympanum	An inscription	Fifth line gives the date of construction	أقول والحق له نورق يقوم في النفس مقام الدليل أن له العرش سبحانه قد عضد الملك بأكفى كفيل فالملك الظاهر بحر الندى أبي سعيد ذي العطاء الجزيل فأصبحت مصر به جنه وأهلها في لهو ظل ظليل والهم الله داواداره يونس للخير وفضل جميل أنفق من ملجأه من ماله خانة الله بخان السبيل يبغي به الأجر وحسن الثناء عليه طول الدهر في كل جيل لا أمر الله بها دولة ولا حامية من بركات الجليل.وتم الخان لتسع مضت بعد ثمانين بعون الجليل وسبع مئين لذا أرخوا وحسبنا اله ونعم الوكيل.	I chant the truth which has splendour and stands s a proof to the soul . That he, praise be to him, the possessor of the throne, has supported kingship a most capable protector. Al-Malik az-Zahir Abu Sa'id, the generous sea, possessor of plentiful bounty. Thus, Egypt has become, through him, a paradise, while its people enjoy their umbrageous shade. Allah has guided the Dawadar Yunis to good deeds. Though this guidance he offered his wealth to establish a caravanserai (Khan) in as-Sabil. All he aimed for was a reward from God and to be praised all the time by generations. May Allah offer him the blessings. With the help of the Almighty he completed this Khan in the year 789 A.H./A.D. 1387 as dated. God will suffice us as he is the most trustworthy.
Left side, on entering the gateway, above and between the doorways of the mosque	An inscription	Surah At-Tawbah 17–18. Also names the builder of the Khan.	بسم الله الرحمن الرحيم انما يعمر مساجد الله من اَمن بالله واليوم الاخر وأقام الصلاة واَتى الزكاة ولم يخشى إلا الله فعسى أولئك أن يكونوا من المهتدين انشأه ووقفه الشريف العالي المولوي الأميري الزعيمي السفيري الشرفي يونس الداوادار مولانا السلطن الملك الظاهري شكر الله عمله وأبلغه مأمله	In the name of Allah, the most gracious, most merciful; The Mosques of God shall establish regular prayers, and practice regular charity, and fear none except God. It is they who are expected to be truly guided

== See also ==
- Destruction of cultural heritage during the Gaza war
- List of archaeological sites in the Gaza Strip
