= Kaalam =

Kaalam may refer to:

- Kāla, Hindu deity of time
- Kaalam (novel), a 1970 novel by M. T. Vasudevan Nair
- Kaalam (film), a 1982 Indian film

== See also ==
- Kalam (disambiguation)
- Kala (disambiguation)
- Kaal (disambiguation)
- Kaala (disambiguation)
