= Kaal (disambiguation) =

Kaal is Sanskrit word and Hindu deity.

Kaal may also refer to:

- Kaal (2005 film), a 2005 Bollywood film
- Kaal (2007 film), a 2007 Tollywood film directed by Bappaditya Bandopadhyay
- KAAL (TV), an ABC television affiliate in Minnesota, U.S.
- Kaal, the fictional planet to which Jeng Droga fled after the Battle of Endor in the Star Wars Expanded Universe
- Kaal, supervillain in the 2013 Indian film Krrish 3, played by Vivek Oberoi
- Aira Kaal (1911–1988), Estonian writer
- Anu Kaal (born 1940), Estonian opera singer
- Mati Kaal (born 1946), Estonian zoologist, mammalogist, animal ecologist and zoo director

== See also ==
- Kaala (disambiguation)
- Kala (disambiguation)
- Kaalam (disambiguation)
- Kalam (disambiguation)
- Kaalpurush (disambiguation)
