= Kaalpurush =

Kaalpurush may refer to:

- Kāla, personification of time or time of death in Hindu mythology, also identified with Yama
  - Kalapurusha, an assistant of the Hindu god Yama
- Kalipurush or Kalpurush, the asura (demon) Kali in Hinduism
- Kaalpurush, a 1994 Indian Bengali action film starring Prosenjit Chatterjee
- Kaalpurush, a 2005 Indian Bengali drama film directed by Buddhadev Dasgupta
- Kalpurush, a novel by Samaresh Majumdar

== See also ==
- Kaal (disambiguation)
- Kala (disambiguation)
