= Kaala =

Kaala may refer to:

- Kaala, Guinea
- Ka'ala, the highest peak on the island of Oahu, Hawaii
- Kaala (2017 film), a 2017 Sinhalese film directed by Sujeewa Gunarathne starring Mahendra Perera
- Kaala (2018 film), a 2018 Indian Tamil film directed by Pa. Ranjith starring Rajinikanth
- Kaala (TV series), a 2023 Indian television series directed by Bejoy Nambiar starring Avinash Tiwary
- Kaala (gastropod), a genus of gastropods in the family Microcystidae

== See also ==
- Kala (disambiguation)
- Kaal (disambiguation)
- Kaalam (disambiguation)
- Kalam (disambiguation)
- Kaal (disambiguation)
