= Khan Yunis =

City in Gaza, Palestine

Coordinates: 31°20′40″N 34°18′11″E

Khan Yunis خان يونس
- City in the Gaza Strip

Arabic transcription(s)
  - Arabic: خان يونس
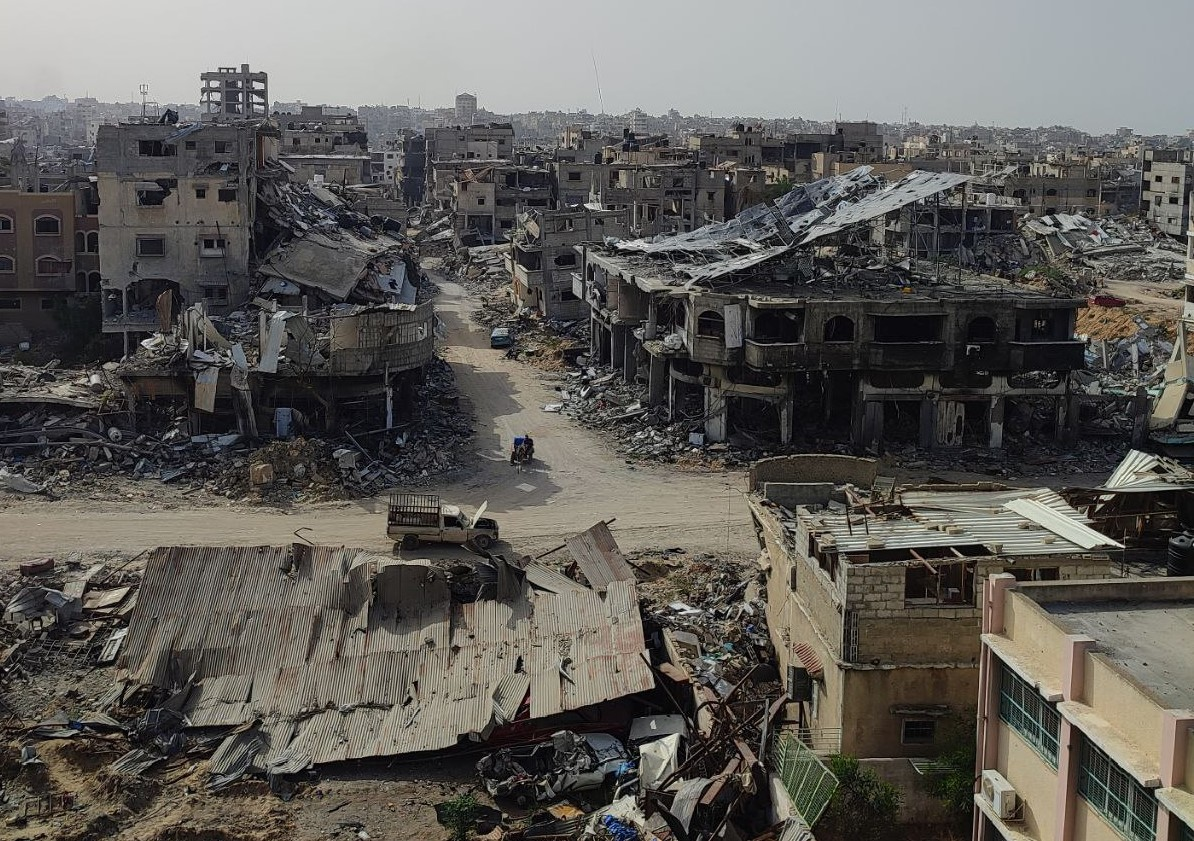
- Al-Seqaly Street in Khan Yunis, June 2024

- Municipal Seal of Khan Younis
- Interactive map of Khan Yunis
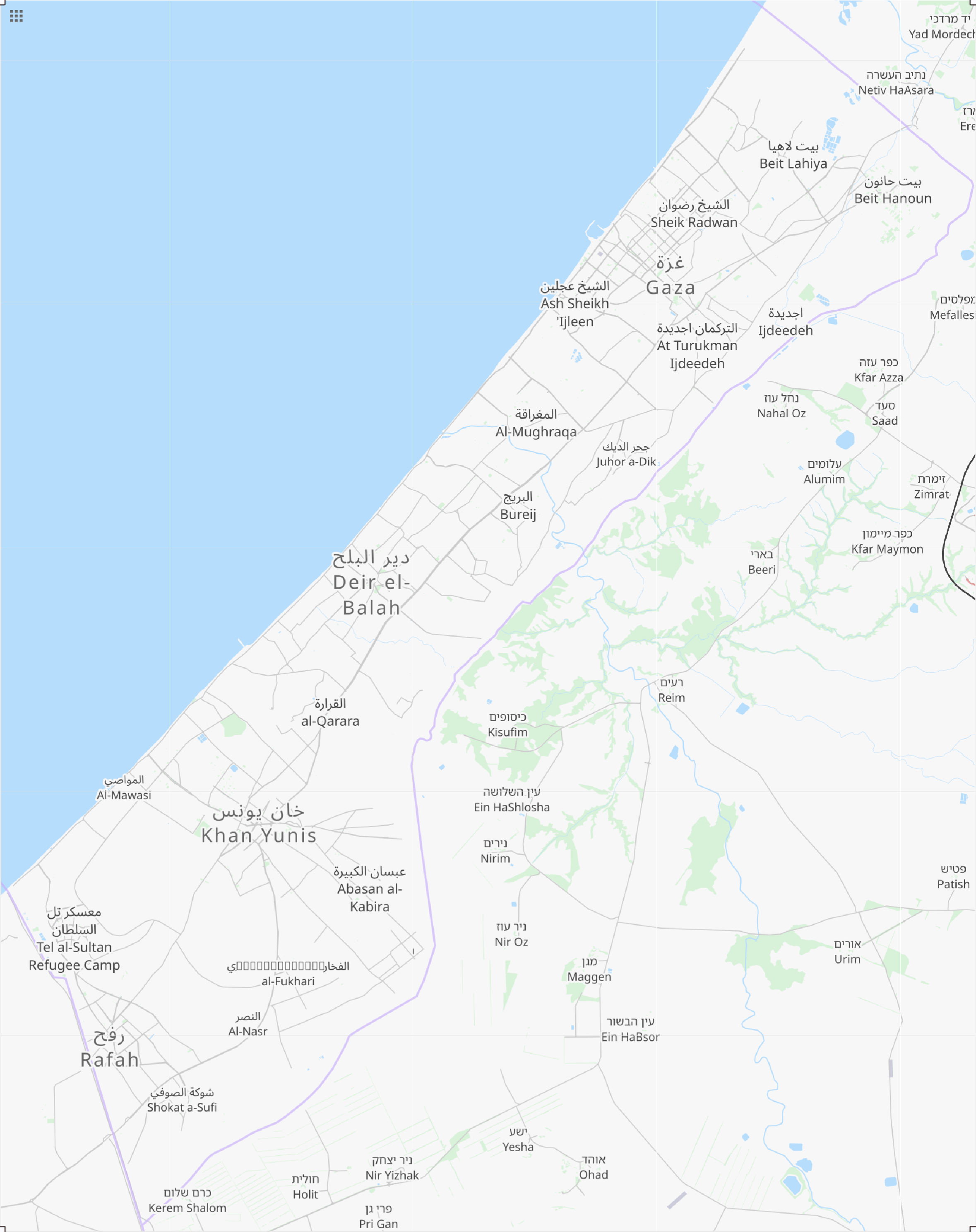
- Location of Khan Yunis within Palestine Khan Yunis (State of Palestine)
- Palestine grid: 83/83
- State: Palestine
- Governorate: Khan Yunis
- Founded: 1387

Government
  - Type: City
  - Head of Municipality: Muhammad Jawad Abd al-Khaliq al-Farra

Area
  - Total: 54.56 km^{2} (21.07 sq mi)

Population (2017)
  - Total: 205,125
  - Density: 3,760/km^{2} (9,737/sq mi)
- Name meaning: "Caravansary [of] Jonah"

Khan Yunis (Arabic: خان يونس, lit. 'khan (caravanserai) [of] Yunis'), also spelled Khan Younis or Khan Yunus, is a city in the southern Gaza Strip, Palestine, and serves as the capital of the Khan Yunis Governorate. It has been largely destroyed during the Gaza war, and is currently split by the yellow line with Hamas controlling its north and Israel controlling its south.

Before the 14th century, Khan Yunis was a village known as "Salqah". A vast caravanserai, today known as Barquq Castle, was constructed there by the emir Yunis al-Nawruzi in 1387–88 to protect caravans, pilgrims, and travellers.

According to the Palestinian Central Bureau of Statistics, Khan Yunis had a population of 205,125 in 2017. Khan Yunis, which lies only four kilometres (2 1/2 miles) east of the Mediterranean Sea, has a semi-arid climate with temperature of 30 °C maximum in summer and 10 °C minimum in winter, with an annual rainfall of approximately 260 mm (10.2 in).

== History ==
=== Ancient period ===
Herodotus describes a city named Ienysos (Ancient Greek: Ιηνυσος) located between Lake Serbonis and Kadytis (modern Gaza city). He talks about how the Persian military marched through the location on its way to Egypt. He also describes how the coastal area between Kadytis and Ienysos was inhabited by local Arab tribes. Some sources, due to phonological resemblance of the names and due to the general matching of the geographic locations, associate this site with modern Khan Yunis.

Other sources have suggested a further inland location of "Khirbet Ma'in Abu Sitta" (Palestinian village depopulated in 1949, near modern kibbutz of Nir Oz) or the Egyptian town of Arish as possible locations of Ienysos, but there is no clear evidence to support this identification.

Ancient discoveries in Khan Yunis feature a lintel with a Greek inscription, discovered repurposed in the tomb of Sheikh Hamada. The inscription translates to: 'Hilarion - giving thanks to St. Georgius.' Originally housed in the Musée de Notre Dame de France in Jerusalem, the lintel is currently lost.

=== Establishment by Mamluks ===
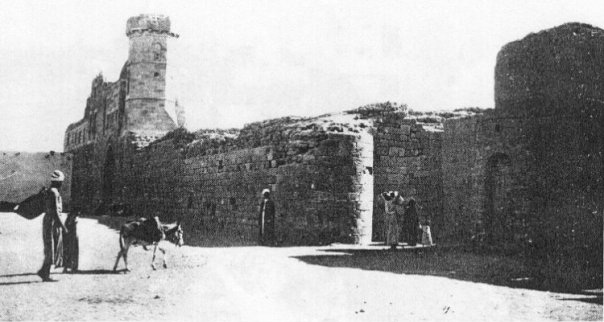
The southern part of the historic khan (Barquq Castle) at Khan Yunis, 1930s

Before the 14th century, Khan Yunis was a village known as "Salqah". A vast caravanserai, today known as Barquq Castle, was constructed there by the emir Yunus al-Nawruzi ad-Dawadar in 1387–88, an official of the Mamluk Empire to protect caravans, pilgrims, and travellers. The growing town surrounding it was named "Khan Yunis" after him. Yunus was killed in battle in 1389. Yunus was the executive secretary (dawadar), one of the high-ranking officials of the Mamluk Circassian sultan Barquq. The town became an important center for trade and its weekly Thursday market drew traders from neighboring regions.

The khan served as resting stop for couriers of the barid, the Mamluk postal network in Palestine and Syria.

=== Ottoman period ===
Khan Yunis was the site of a minor battle in late 1516, when the Egypt-based Mamluks were defeated by Ottoman forces under the leadership of Hadim Sinan Pasha. The Ottoman sultan Selim I then arrived in the area where he led the Ottoman army across the Sinai Peninsula to conquer Egypt. During the 17th and 18th centuries the Ottomans assigned an Asappes garrison associated with the Cairo Citadel to guard the fortress at Khan Yunis. The village and its fortified caravenserai continued to function as an important stop on the Cairo-Damascus road.

Pierre Jacotin named the village Kan Jounes on his map from 1799, while in 1838, Robinson noted Khan Yunas as a Muslim village located in the Gaza district. In 1863 French explorer Victor Guérin visited Khan Yunis. He found it had about a thousand inhabitants, and that many fruit trees, especially apricots were planted in the vicinity.

During the Ottoman period, the Bedouin tribe of 'Arab al-Wahidat (عرب الوحيدات) were among the residents of Khan Yunis.

At the end of the 19th century, the Ottomans established a municipal council to administer the affairs of Khan Yunis, which had become the second largest town in the Gaza District after Gaza itself.

=== British Mandate ===
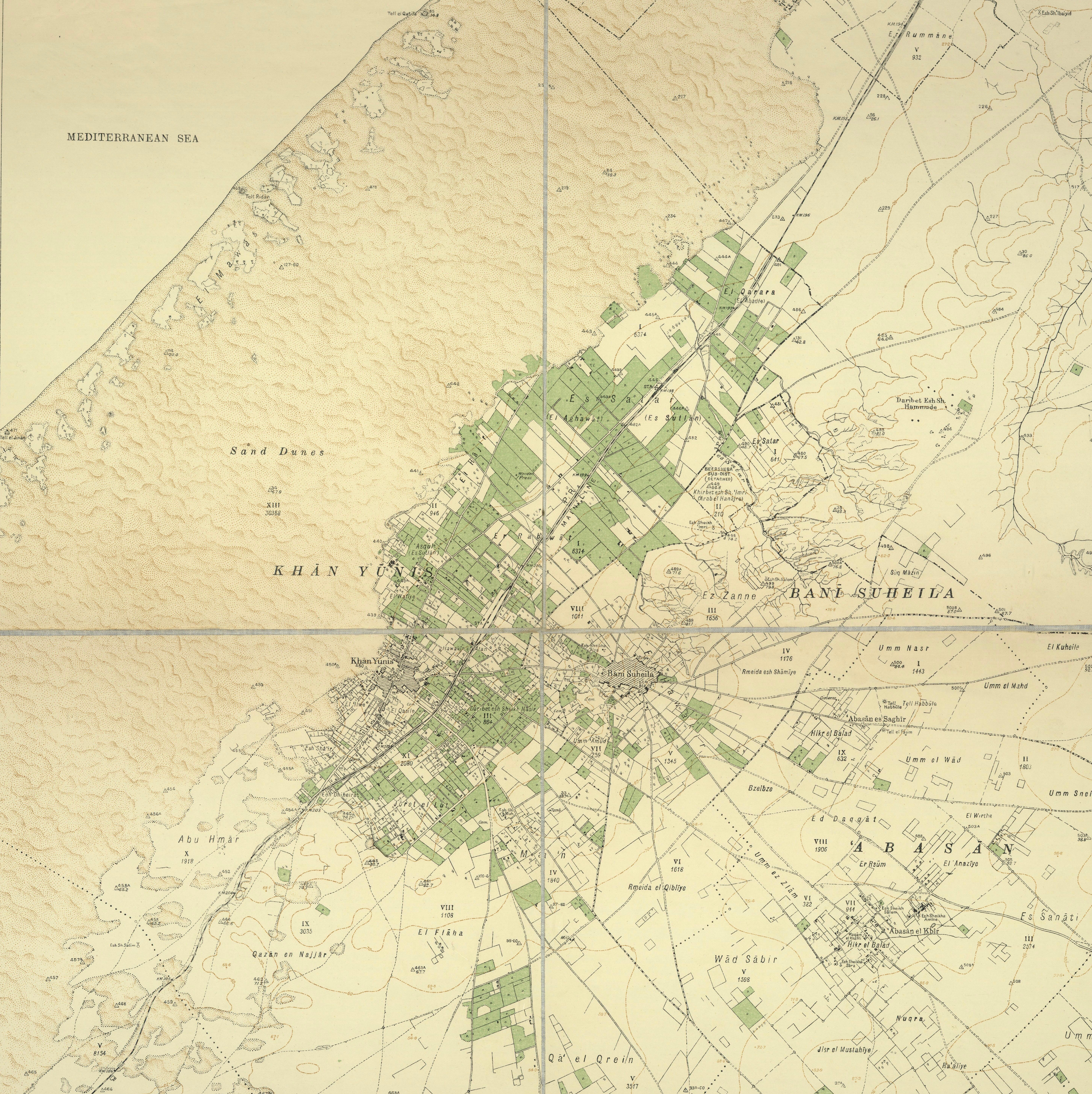
Khan Yunis 1931 1:20,000

In the 1922 census of Palestine conducted by the British Mandate authorities, Khan Yunis had a population of 3890 inhabitants (3866 Muslims, 23 Christians, and one Jew), decreasing in the 1931 census to 3811 (3767 Muslims, 41 Christians, and three Jews), in 717 houses in the urban area and 3440 (3434 Muslims and 6 Christians) in 566 houses in the suburbs.

In the 1938 village statistics, the population is listed as 4,379 (including three Jews) with 3,953 in nearby suburbs. In the 1945 statistics, Khan Yunis had a population of 11,220 (11,180 Muslims and 40 Christians), with 2,302 (urban) and 53,820 (rural) dunams of land, according to an official land and population survey. Of this, 4,172 dunams were plantations and irrigable land, 23,656 used for cereals, while 1,847 dunams were built-up land.

=== 1948–1967 ===
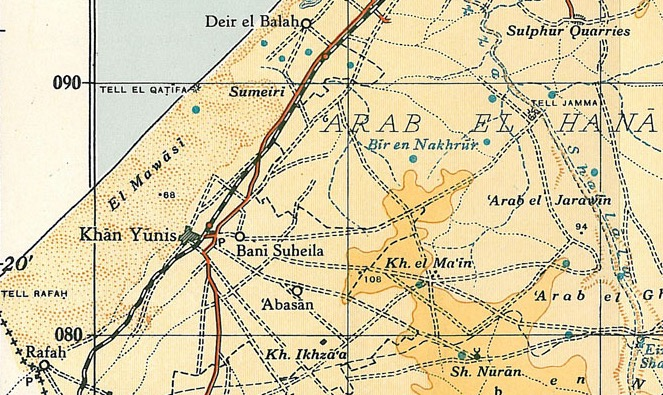
Khan Yunis 1945 1:250,000

Khan Yunis was one of the towns where Palestinian refugees who were forcibly expelled from areas of Palestine to the east and north of the Gaza Strip gathered, to wait for a resolution that would allow then to return to their ancestral villages and homes.

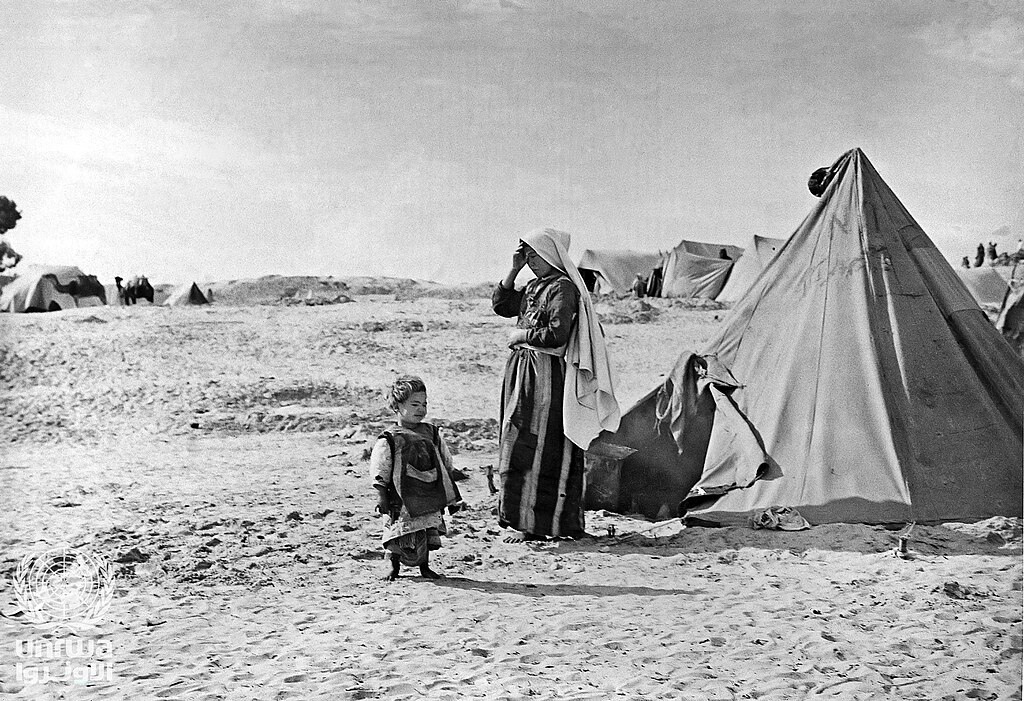
A mother and child stand next to their tent in a newly formed Khan Younis refugee camp in the wake of the war in 1948 (courtesy of UNRWA)

During the night of 31 August 1955, three Israeli paratroop companies attacked the British-built Tegart fort in Khan Yunis from where attacks had been carried out against Israelis. The police station, a petrol station and several buildings in the village of Abasan were destroyed, as well as railway tracks and telegraph poles. In heavy fighting, 72 Egyptian soldiers were killed. One Israeli soldier was killed and 17 were wounded. The operation led to a ceasefire on September 4, forcing President Gamal Abdel Nasser and the Egyptian government to halt Palestinian fedayeen operations against Israel. One of the mechanized companies was commanded by Rafael Eitan.

Before the Suez War, Khan Yunis was officially administered by the All-Palestine Government, seated in Gaza and later in Cairo. After a fierce firefight, the Sherman tanks of the IDF 37th Armored Brigade broke through the heavily fortified lines outside of Khan Yunis held by the 86th Palestinian Brigade. It was the only site in the Gaza strip where the Egyptian army put up any resistance to the Israeli invasion of Gaza, but it surrendered on 3 November 1956.

There are conflicting reports of what happened. Israel said that Palestinians were killed when Israeli forces were still facing armed resistance, while the Palestinians said all resistance had ceased by then, and that many unarmed civilians were killed as the Israel troops went through the town and camp, seeking men in possession of arms.

The killings, dubbed the Khan Yunis massacre, were reported to the UN General Assembly on 15 December 1956 by the Director of the United Nations Relief and Works Agency, Henry Labouisse. According to the report, the exact number of dead and wounded is not known, but the director received lists of names of persons allegedly killed from a trustworthy source, including 275 people, of which 140 were refugees and 135 local residents.

After 1959, the All-Palestine Government of Gaza Strip was abolished and the city was included in the United Arab Republic, which was shortly disestablished and the Gaza Strip came under the direct Egyptian military occupation rule.

=== 1967 and aftermath ===
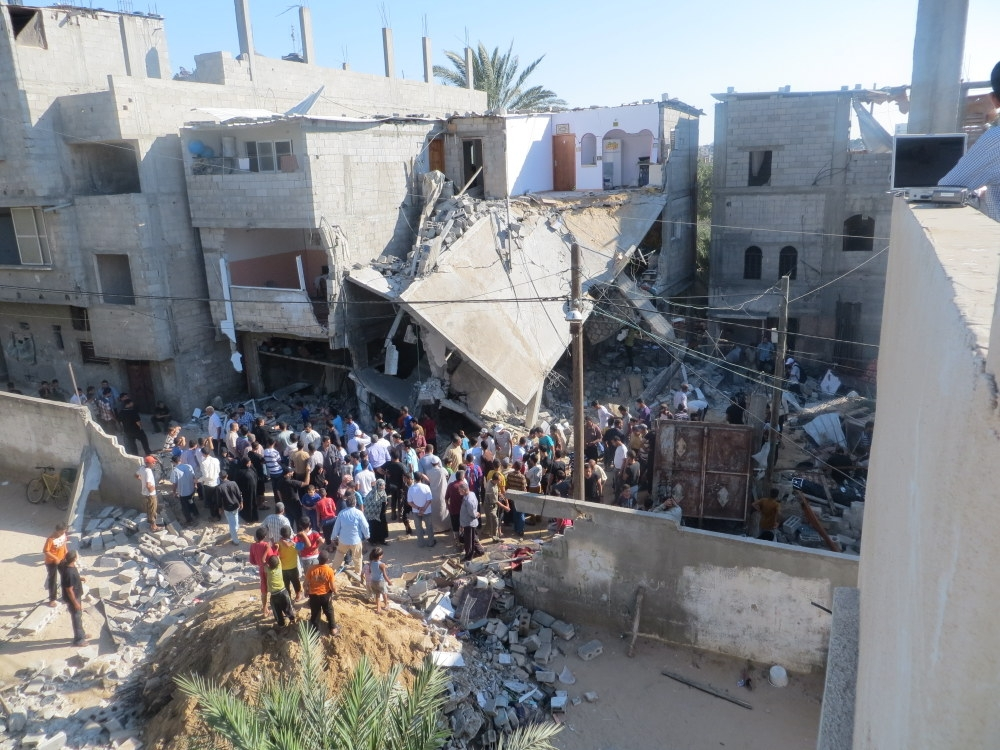
The Kaware house after bombing in 2014, see Kaware family home

In 1967, during the Six-Day War, Israel occupied Khan Yunis again.

As a result of the 1993-1995 Oslo Accords, Khan Yunis and most of the Gaza Strip (excluding Israeli settlements and military areas) were placed under the control of the Palestinian Authority.

Khan Yunis was the site of Israeli helicopter attacks in August 2001 and October 2002 that left several civilians killed, hundreds wounded and civilian buildings within the vicinity destroyed.

The Palestinian Authority came into control of the entirety of the Strip following the 2005 Israeli disengagement. However, following the Battle of Gaza in 2007, Hamas took over the Gaza Strip and established its own government in the region.

=== Israel–Gaza war ===
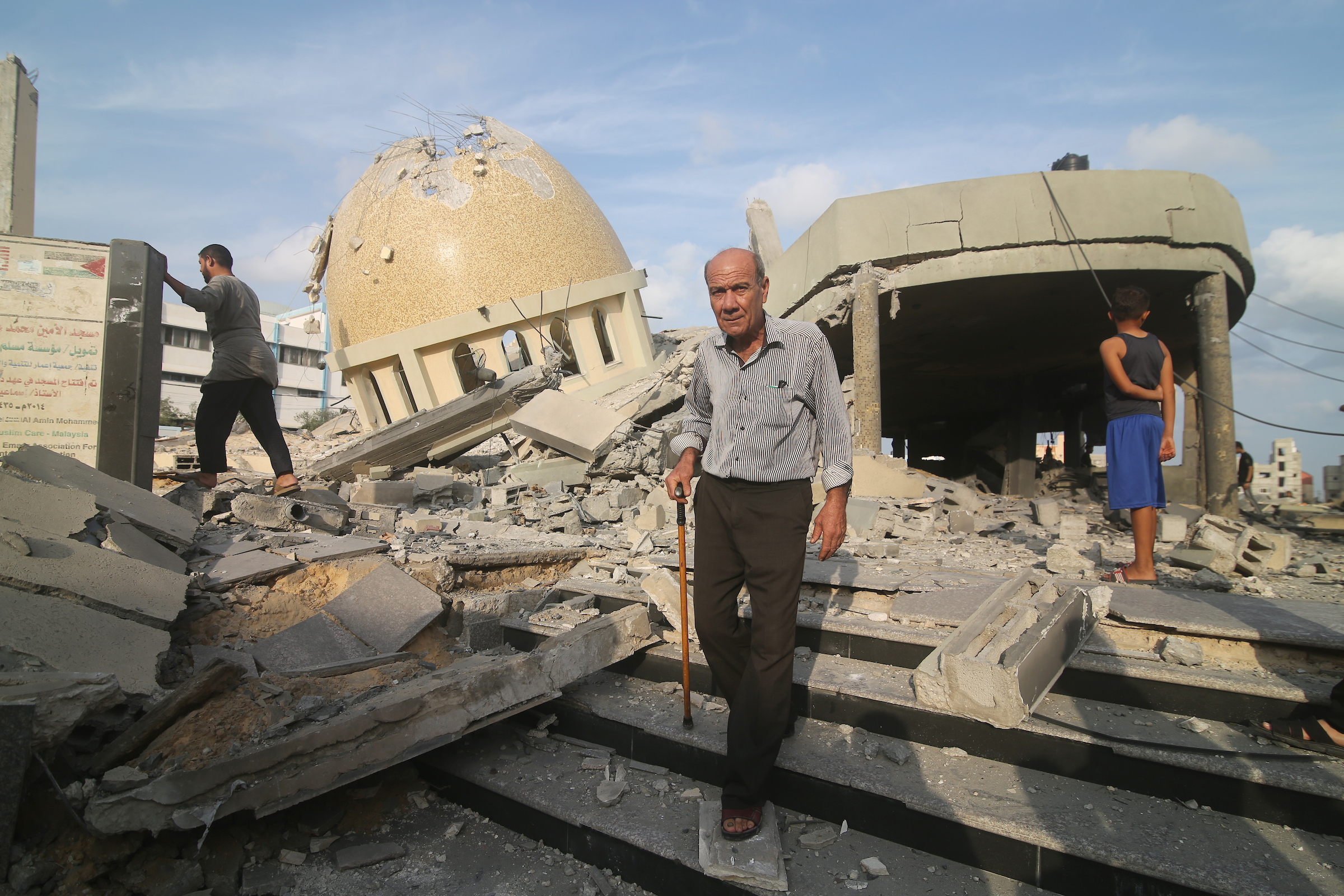
Ruins of a mosque destroyed in Israeli airstrikes in Khan Yunis, on October 8, 2023

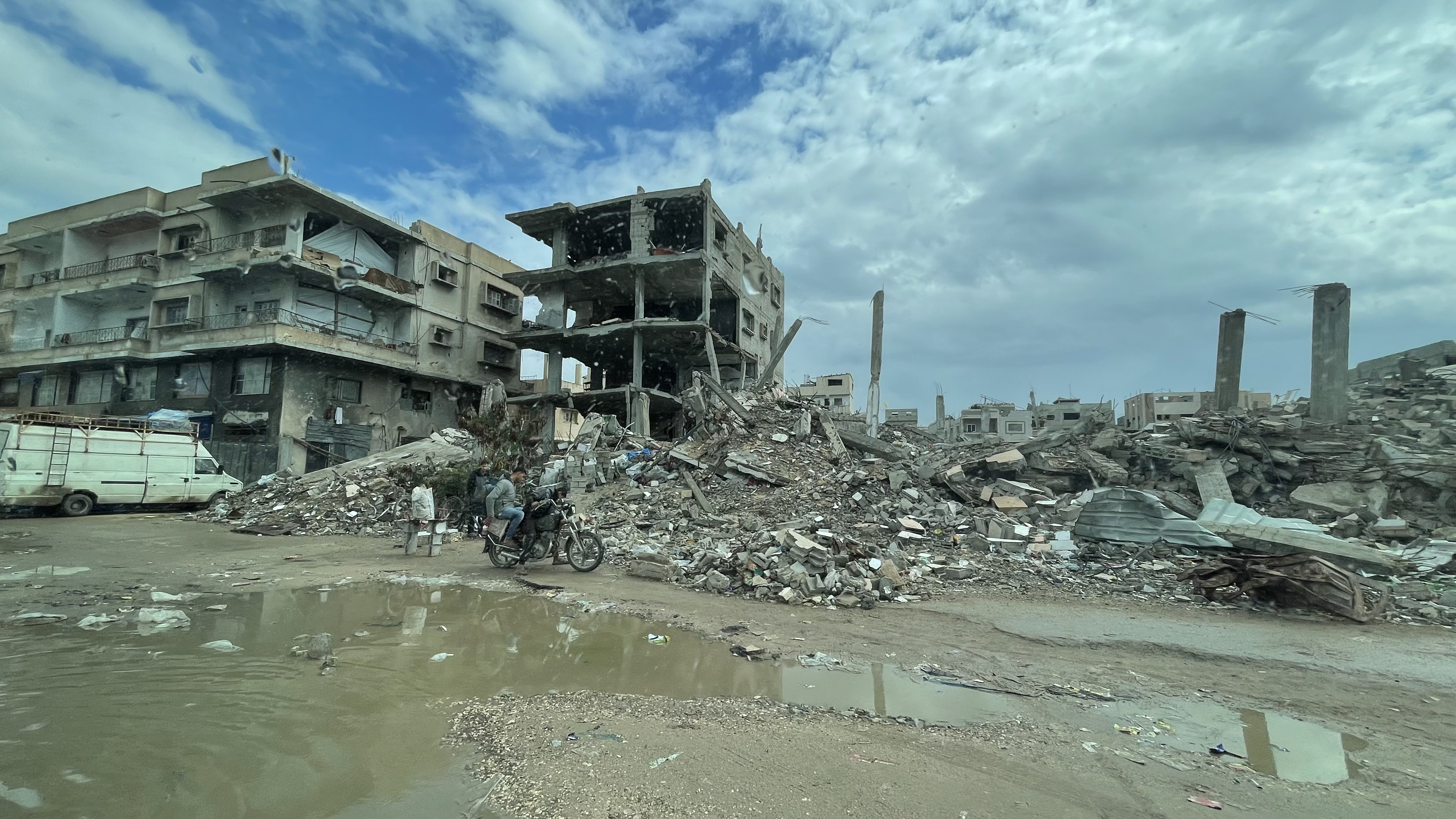
Damage in Khan Yunis in 2025

During the ongoing Israel–Gaza war, Israel has bombed Khan Yunis along with other cities in the Gaza Strip as part of an offensive against Hamas. The Israeli Air Force extensively bombed much of the city, including the Hamad City apartment complex. Local sources have reported numerous civilian casualties in Khan Yunis as a result of Israeli bombings, which Palestinian news agency Wafa put at "at least 70" as of December 3. The Al Qarara Cultural Museum was destroyed in an explosion as a result of an Israeli attack in October 2023, part of an offensive that reportedly targeted civilian homes and mosques in the vicinity. Israeli armored units began entering the outskirts of the city in December 2023. After several months of fighting, Israeli forces ended up withdrawing from Khan Yunis and most of the southern Gaza Strip. Having failed to root out Hamas from Khan Yunis, Israeli forces began a second invasion of the city in late July 2024, which also ended in an Israeli withdrawal. Israeli forces invaded Khan Yunis yet again in August 2024, and withdrew once more at the end of the month. Following the January 2025 ceasefire, Hamas forces were seen parading through Khan Yunis. Following the resumption of the war in March, Israeli forces launched a fourth invasion of the city in May.

== Economy ==
Khan Yunis is the second largest urban area in the Gaza Strip after Gaza City. It serves as the principal market center of the territory's southern half and hosts a weekly Bedouin souk ("open-air market") mostly involving local commodities. As of 2012 Khan Yunis had the highest unemployment rate in the Palestinian territories.

== Education ==
- University College of Science and Technology
- Al Quds Open University
- Palestine College of Nursing

== Culture and heritage ==
=== Barquq Castle ===
Barquq Castle was a Mamluk-era fortified mosque and caravanserai. It was badly damaged by the Israeli army during the Gaza war.

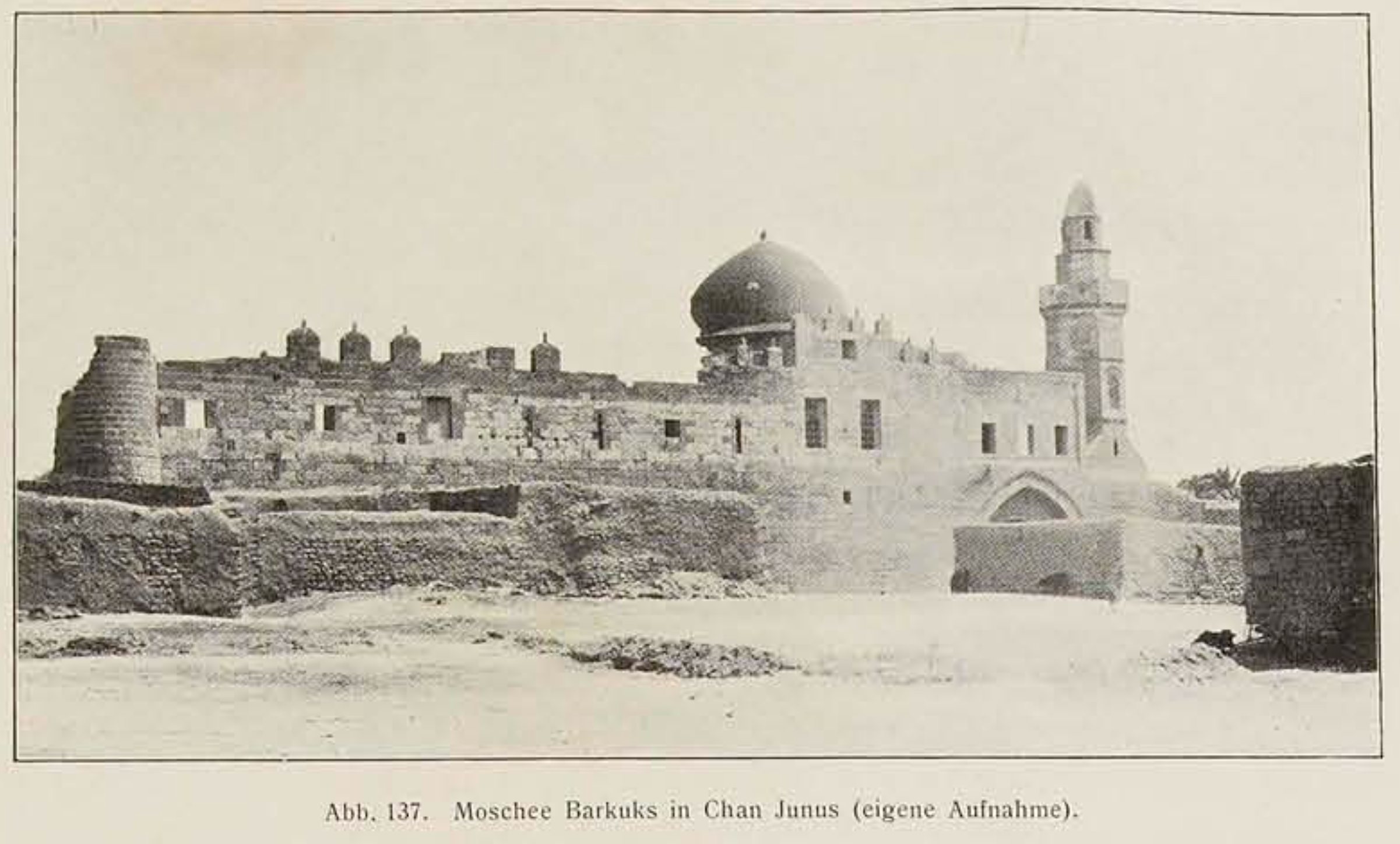
At the beginning of the 20th century

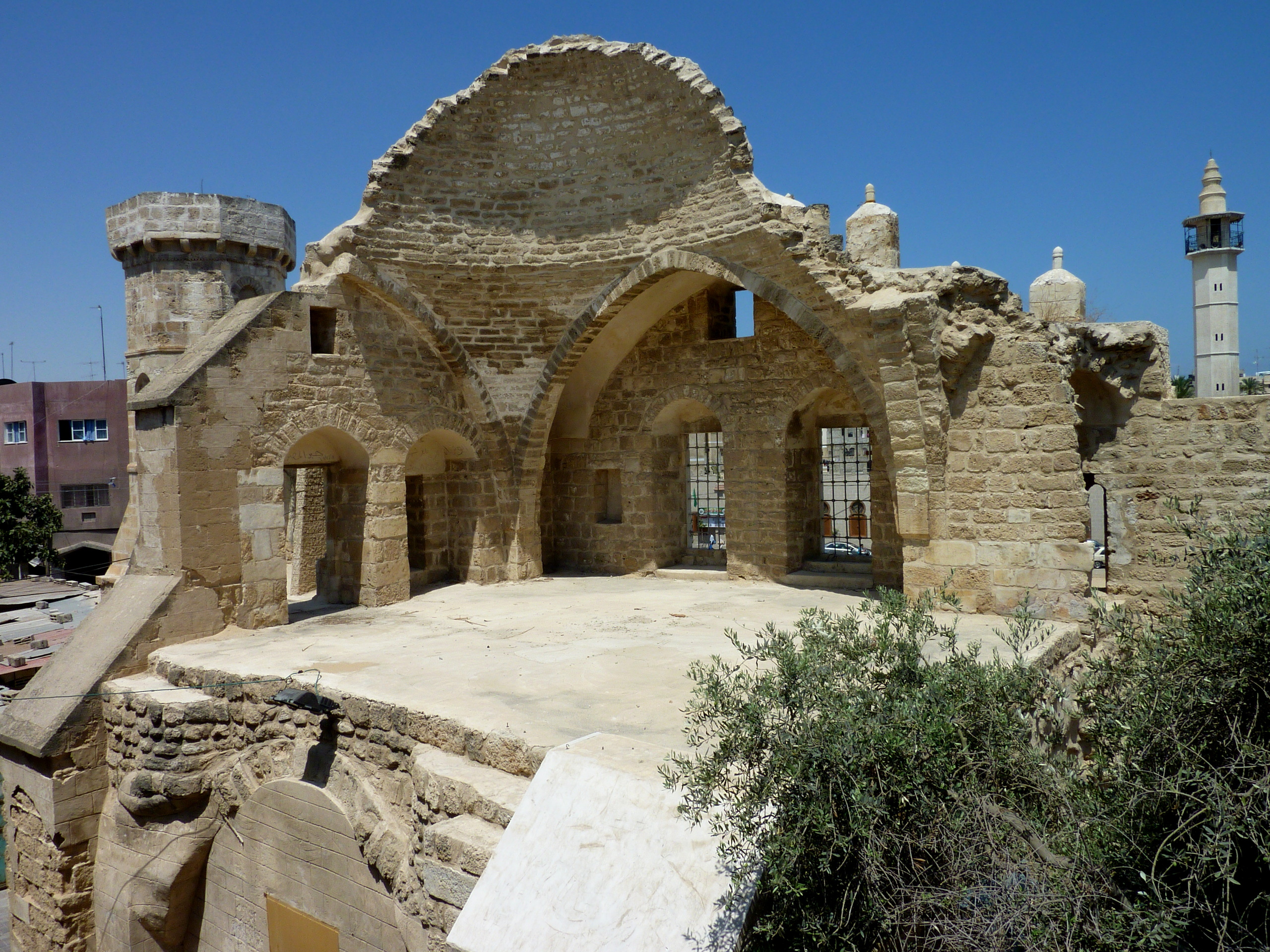
Interior remains in 2016

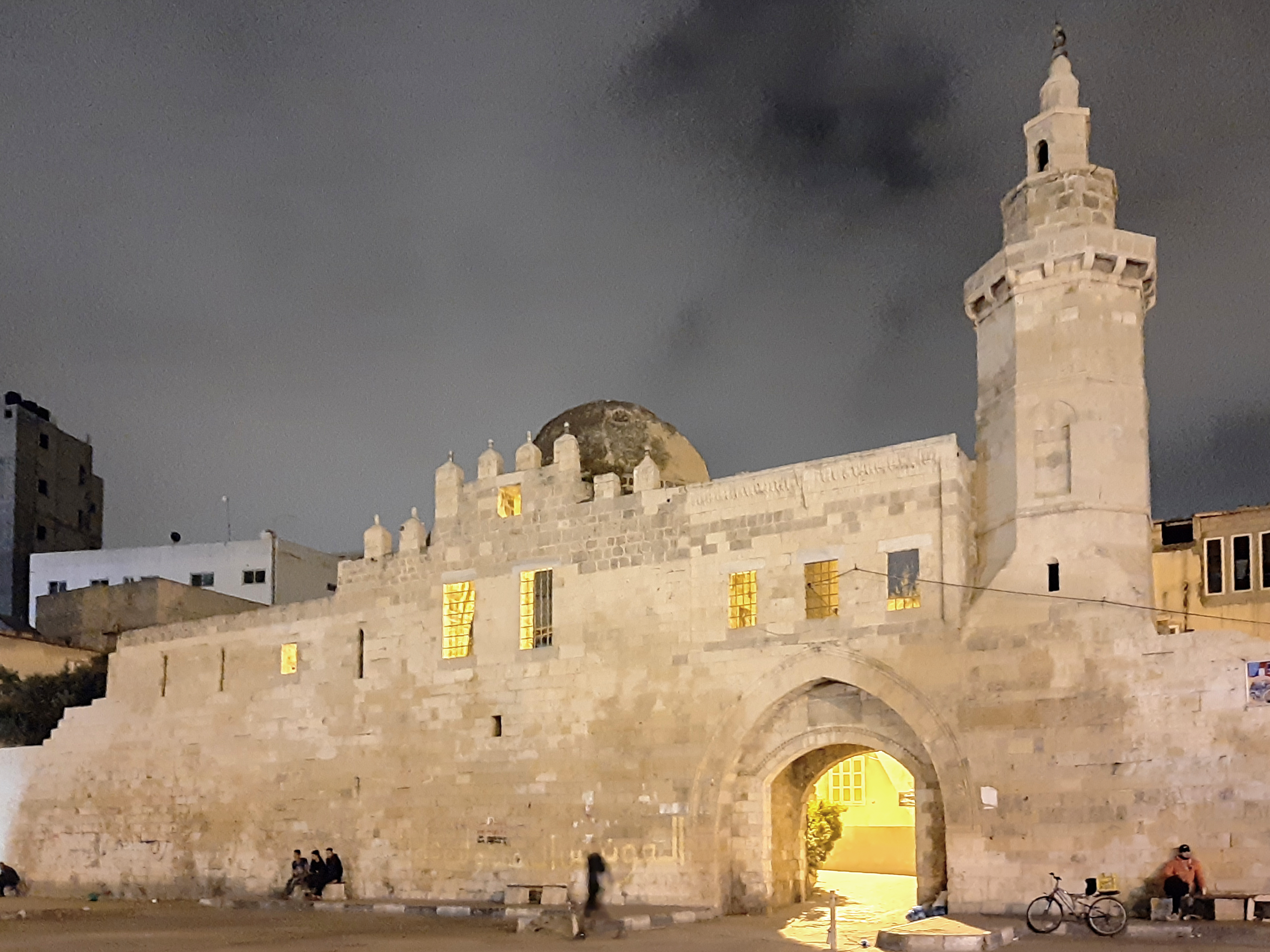
Barquq castle exterior in 2020

=== Al Qarara Cultural Museum ===
Located in Al-Qarara, on the outskirts of Khan Yunis, the cultural museum tells the story of the history of Palestine. Key objects included Byzantine mosaics, swords dating to the Crusader period, thobes, as well as jewellery worn by women prior to the Nakba. It also included military items dating to the British Mandate in Palestine.

The museum's structure, display cases, and collection were destroyed in October 2023 by Israeli forces.

== Notable people ==
- Hiba Abu Nada (1991 – 2023), poet and novelist killed in an Israeli air force bombing of her home in Khan Yunis
- Rouzan al-Najjar, nurse born September 11, 1996, in Khan Younes, killed by a bullet of an Israeli army sniper in June 2018
- Mohammed Assaf, singer who grew up in the Khan Yunis refugee camp, winner of the second season of Arab Idol
- Mohammed Shabir (1946 – 2023), doctor in microbiology and former president of The Islamic University in Gaza killed by an Israeli sniper during Gaza War
- Yahya Sinwar (1962 – 2024), Palestinian militant and politician who served as chairman of the Hamas Political Bureau from August 2024, and as the leader of Hamas in the Gaza Strip from February 2017, until his death in October 2024
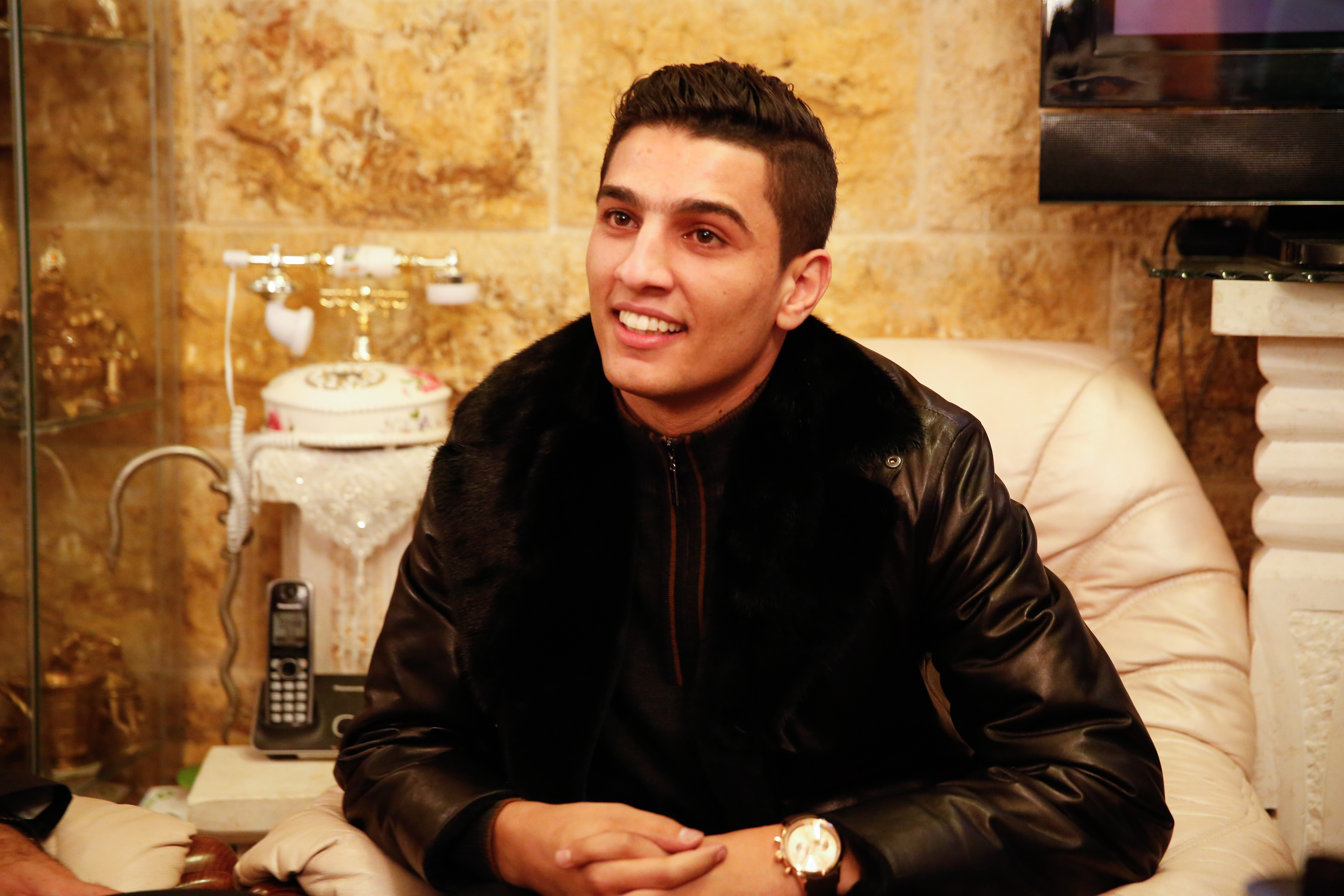
Mohammed Assaf

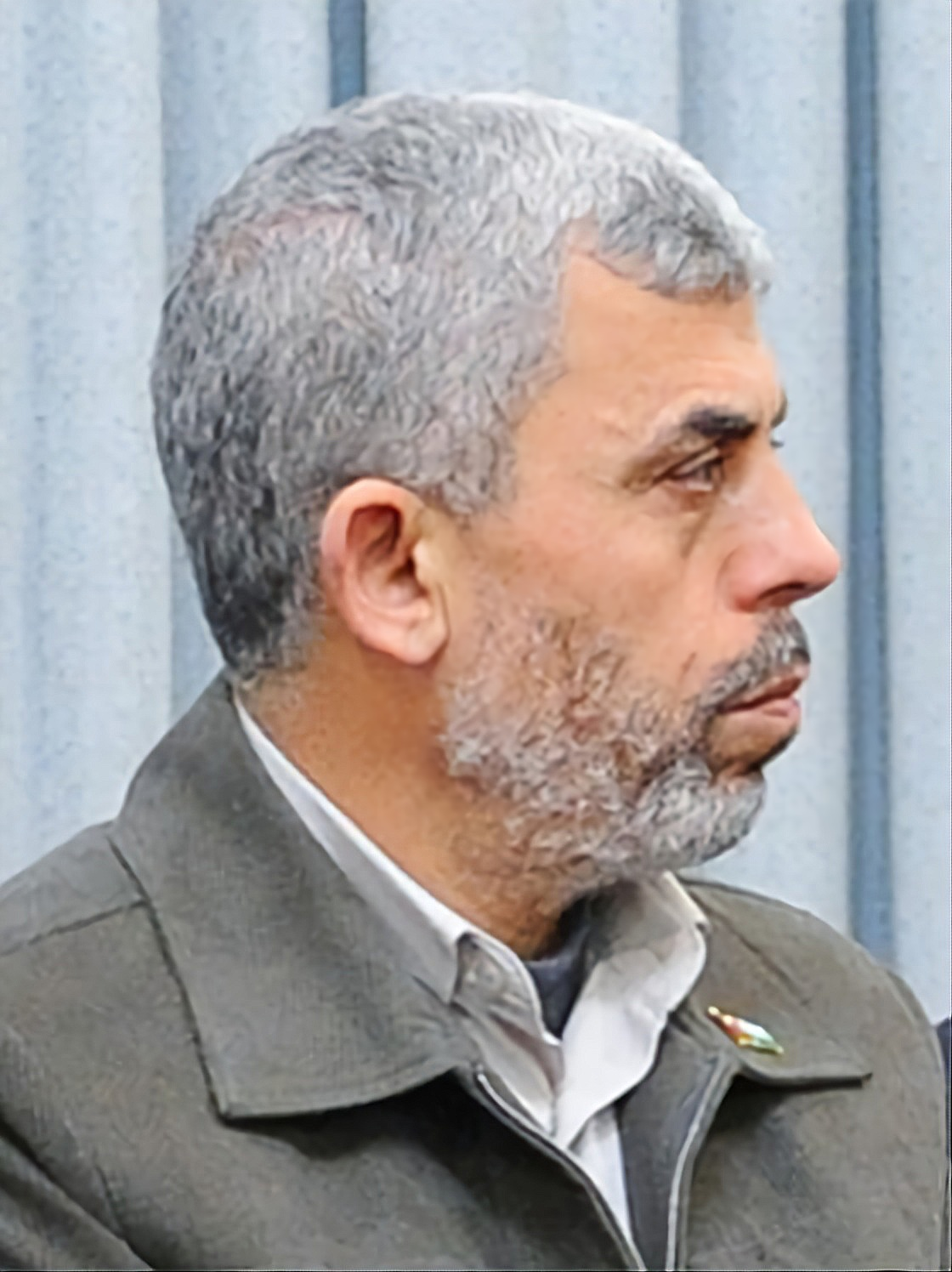
Yahya Sinwar

== International relations ==
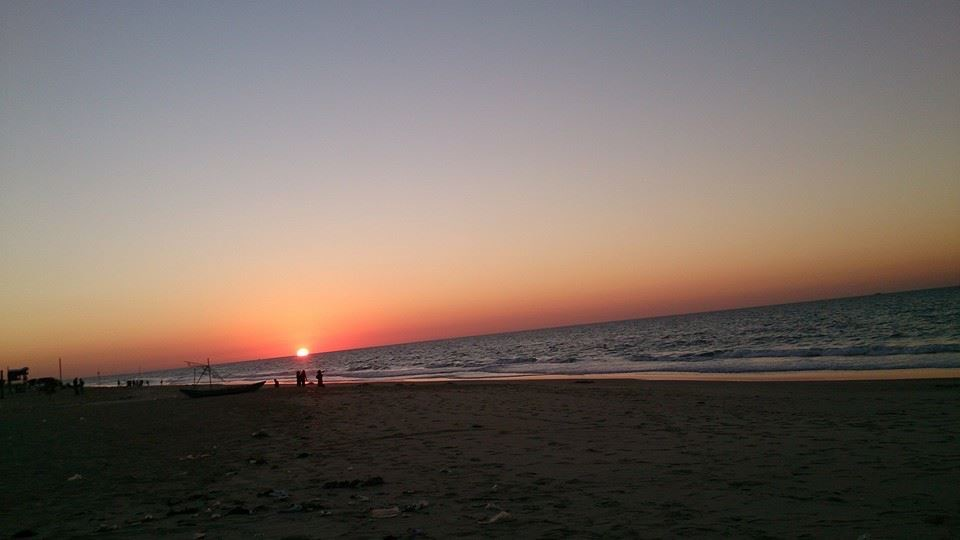
Khan Yunis beach

=== Twin towns – sister cities ===
Khan Yunis is twinned with the following cities:

- Hamar, Norway
- Almuñécar, Spain
- Évry, France
- Bisceglie, Italy
- Alcamo, Italy

== See also ==
- Palestinian refugee camps
- List of cities in Palestinian National Authority areas

== Bibliography ==
- Barron, J.B., ed. (1923). Palestine: Report and General Abstracts of the Census of 1922. Government of Palestine.
- Department of Statistics (1945). Village Statistics, April, 1945. Government of Palestine.
- Derori, Zeʼev (2005). Israel's reprisal policy, 1953-1956: the dynamics of military retaliation. Routledge. ISBN 0714685518.
- Feldman, Ilana (2008). Governing Gaza: Bureaucracy, Authority, and the Work of Rule, 1917–1967. Duke University Press. ISBN 978-0822342403.
- Guérin, V. (1869). Description Géographique Historique et Archéologique de la Palestine (in French). Vol. 1: Judee, pt. 2. Paris: L'Imprimerie Nationale.
- Hadawi, S. (1970). Village Statistics of 1945: A Classification of Land and Area ownership in Palestine. Palestine Liberation Organization Research Center. Archived from the original on 8 December 2018.
- Hathaway, Jane (2002). The Politics of Households in Ottoman Egypt: The Rise of the Qazdaglis. Cambridge University Press. ISBN 0521892945.
- Katz, Samuel M. (1988). Israeli Elite Units since 1948. Osprey Publishing. ISBN 0-85045-837-4.
- Karmon, Y. (1960). "An Analysis of Jacotin's Map of Palestine" (PDF). Israel Exploration Journal. 10 (3, 4): 155–173, 244–253. Archived from the original (PDF) on 22 December 2019.
- Mills, E., ed. (1932). Census of Palestine 1931. Population of Villages, Towns and Administrative Areas. Jerusalem: Government of Palestine.
- Morris, B. (1993). Israel's Border Wars, 1949-1956: Arab Infiltration, Israeli Retaliation, and the Countdown to the Suez War. Oxford University Press. ISBN 0-19-829262-7.
- Robinson, E.; Smith, E. (1841). Biblical Researches in Palestine, Mount Sinai and Arabia Petraea: A Journal of Travels in the year 1838. Vol. 3. Boston: Crocker & Brewster.
- Sacco, J. (2009). Footnotes in Gaza. New York: Metropolitan Books. ISBN 978-0-8050-7347-8.
- Sharon, M. (1999). Corpus Inscriptionum Arabicarum Palaestinae, B-C. Vol. 2. BRILL. ISBN 9004110836.
- Varble, Derek (2003). The Suez Crisis 1956. London: Osprey Publishing. ISBN 1841764183.
