= Qila Sura Singh =

- Village
- Location within Pakistan
- Coordinates: 30.39°N 73.44°E
- Country: Pakistan
- Province: Punjab
- Elevation: 168 m (551 ft)

Population
  - Total: about 3,000
- Time zone: UTC+5 (PST)
- Calling code: 50810

Qila Sura Singh is a village in the Punjab province of Pakistan. It is located at 30°39'5N 73°44'25E with an altitude of 168 metres (554 feet).

== History ==
During the Sikh Misl period, Before Partition of Punjab Qila Sura Singh was inhabited by Sukerchakia Labanas who were mainly land owners, farmers, soldiers, and civil workers. Some of the villagers were recorded to have served in the 48th Pioneers during the First World War. After partition mostly all of the Sikh villagers migrated to the eastern half of Punjab, and what later became Haryana. Most of the refugees left before the major riots began in August, traveling through Jammu into Punjab. The inhabitants of Qila Sura Singh were accompanied by Sikhs and Hindus from surrounding areas. The descendants of the aforementioned refugees can be found mainly in the Doab region of the Punjab and Ambala district of Haryana.
