= Kalut, Iran =

Kalut كلوت
- Village
- Location within Iran
- Coordinates: 27°03′30″N 57°04′04″E
- Country: Iran
- Province: Hormozgan
- County: Minab
- Bakhsh: Central
- Rural District: Band-e Zarak

Population (2006)
  - Total: 1,118
- Time zone: UTC+3:30 (IRST)
  - Summer (DST): UTC+4:30 (IRDT)

Kalut (Persian: كلوت, also Romanized as Kalūt) is a village in Band-e Zarak Rural District, in the Central District of Minab County, Hormozgan Province, Iran. At the 2006 census, its population was 1,118, in 214 families.
