= Qalat-e Rostam =

Qalat-e Rostam قلات رستم
- Village
- Location within Iran
- Coordinates: 27°01′04″N 57°19′16″E
- Country: Iran
- Province: Hormozgan
- County: Minab
- Bakhsh: Central
- Rural District: Karian

Population (2006)
  - Total: 40
- Time zone: UTC+3:30 (IRST)
  - Summer (DST): UTC+4:30 (IRDT)

Qalat-e Rostam (Persian: قلات رستم, also Romanized as Qalāt-e Rostam) is a village in Karian Rural District, in the Central District of Minab County, Hormozgan Province, Iran. At the 2006 census, its population was 40, in 8 families.
