= Qalat, Bavanat =

Qalat قلات
- Village
- Location within Iran
- Coordinates: 29°50′40″N 53°58′37″E
- Country: Iran
- Province: Fars
- County: Bavanat
- Bakhsh: Sarchehan
- Rural District: Tujerdi

Population (2006)
  - Total: 146
- Time zone: UTC+3:30 (IRST)
  - Summer (DST): UTC+4:30 (IRDT)

Qalat (Persian: قلات, also Romanized as Qalāt) is a village in Tujerdi Rural District, Sarchehan District, Bavanat County, Fars province, Iran. At the 2006 census, its population was 146, in 34 families.
