= Qala =

Qala may refer to:

- Qal'a, meaning 'fortress' in Arabic and Classical Persian
- Qala, Azerbaijan
- Qala, Malta, a village on Gozo Island, Malta
  - Qala Saints F.C., a football club based in Qala, Malta
- Qala (film), a 2022 Indian Hindi-language psychological-drama film
  - Qala (soundtrack), its soundtrack album by Amit Trivedi and Sagar Desai

== See also ==
- Kala (disambiguation)
- Qalat (disambiguation), places whose names contain the words Qalat, Qelat, Kalat, Kalaat, Kalut, or Kelat
- Qila (disambiguation), Persian (Urdu, Hindi) variant of Arabic qal'a
