= Kalat, Hormozgan =

Kalat كلات
- Village
- Location within Iran
- Coordinates: 26°43′36″N 53°53′34″E
- Country: Iran
- Province: Hormozgan
- County: Bandar Lengeh
- Bakhsh: Shibkaveh
- Rural District: Bandar Charak

Population (2006)
  - Total: 85
- Time zone: UTC+3:30 (IRST)
  - Summer (DST): UTC+4:30 (IRDT)

Kalat (Persian: كلات, also Romanized as Kalāt; also known as Kalat al Abeid, Kalāt ol ‘Abīd, and Qala-āt al ‘Abaid) is a village in Bandar Charak Rural District, Shibkaveh District, Bandar Lengeh County, Hormozgan Province, Iran. At the 2006 census, its population was 85, in 15 families.
