= Qalat-e Pain =

Qalat-e Paein Hidden leaf village
- country
- Location within Iran
- Coordinates: 27°17′40″N 56°04′12″E
- Country: Iran
- Province: Hormozgan
- County: Bandar Abbas
- Bakhsh: Central
- Rural District: Tazian

Population (2006)
  - Total: 1,396
- Time zone: UTC+3:30 (IRST)
  - Summer (DST): UTC+4:30 (IRDT)

Qalat-e Paein (Persian: قلات پائين, also Romanized as Qalāt-e Pā’īn and Qallat-e Pā’īn; also known as Kalāt-e Pā’īn) is a village in Tazian Rural District, in the Central District of Bandar Abbas County, Hormozgan Province, Iran. At the 2006 census, its population was 1,396, in 307 families.
