= Kalat, Badakhshan =

Kalat
- Location in Afghanistan
- Coordinates: 35°57′56″N 70°35′23″E
- Country: Afghanistan
- Province: Badakhshan Province
- District: Kuran wa Munjan
- Time zone: + 4.30

Kalat is a village in Badakhshan Province in north-eastern Afghanistan.
