= Qalat, Charam =

Qalat قلات
- Village
- Location within Iran
- Coordinates: 30°30′49″N 51°07′30″E
- Country: Iran
- Province: Kohgiluyeh and Boyer-Ahmad
- County: Charam
- Bakhsh: Central
- Rural District: Charam

Population (2006)
  - Total: 55
- Time zone: UTC+3:30 (IRST)
  - Summer (DST): UTC+4:30 (IRDT)

Qalat (Persian: قلات, also Romanized as Qalāt; also known as Qal”ah Qalat, Qal‘eh-i-Qalat, Qal‘eh-ye Qalāt, and Qal‘eh-ye Qolat) is a village in Charam Rural District, in the Central District of Charam County, Kohgiluyeh and Boyer-Ahmad Province, Iran. At the 2006 census, its population was 55, in 8 families.
