= Kalat-e Mahmak =

Kalat-e Mahmak كلات محمك
- Village
- Location within Iran
- Coordinates: 27°03′27″N 57°22′21″E
- Country: Iran
- Province: Hormozgan
- County: Minab
- Bakhsh: Senderk
- Rural District: Bondar

Population (2006)
  - Total: 7
- Time zone: UTC+3:30 (IRST)
  - Summer (DST): UTC+4:30 (IRDT)

Kalat-e Mahmak (Persian: كلات محمك, also Romanized as Kalāt-e Maḩmak) is a village in Bondar Rural District, Senderk District, Minab County, Hormozgan Province, Iran. At the 2006 census, its population was 7, in 4 families.
