= Shahr-e Shib Kalah =

Shahr-e Shib Kalah شهرشيب كلاه
- Village
- Location within Iran
- Coordinates: 26°42′07″N 57°52′46″E
- Country: Iran
- Province: Hormozgan
- County: Bashagard
- Bakhsh: Gowharan
- Rural District: Gowharan

Population (2006)
  - Total: 82
- Time zone: UTC+3:30 (IRST)
  - Summer (DST): UTC+4:30 (IRDT)

Shahr-e Shib Kalah (Persian: شهرشيب كلاه, also Romanized as Shahr-e Shīb Kalāh; also known as Kalāh) is a village in Gowharan Rural District, Gowharan District, Bashagard County, Hormozgan Province, Iran. At the 2006 census, its population was 82, in 22 families.
