= Kalat, Chaharmahal and Bakhtiari =

Kalat كلات
- Village
- Location within Iran
- Coordinates: 31°10′29″N 51°09′05″E
- Country: Iran
- Province: Chaharmahal and Bakhtiari
- County: Lordegan
- Bakhsh: Falard
- Rural District: Poshtkuh

Population (2006)
  - Total: 45
- Time zone: UTC+3:30 (IRST)
  - Summer (DST): UTC+4:30 (IRDT)

Kalat (Persian: كلات, also Romanized as Kalāt) is a village in Poshtkuh Rural District, Falard District, Lordegan County, Chaharmahal and Bakhtiari Province, Iran. At the 2006 census, its population was 45, in 8 families. The village is populated by Lurs.
