= Kala =

Kala or Kalah may refer to:

== Sanskrit words ==
- Kāla, meaning 'time' or 'black', and in various Indian religions the personification of time as a deity
  - an epithet of the Hindu god Yama
  - an epithet of the Hindu god Shiva
- Kalā, meaning 'performing arts'

== Arts and entertainment ==
=== Fictional characters ===
- Kala (comics), in Marvel comics
- Kala (Tarzan), adoptive mother of Tarzan
- Kala, in the animation The Jungle Book
- Kala, in the 1987 TV series Teenage Mutant Ninja Turtles
- Kala, in the TV series Sense8
- King Kala, in the comic strip Flash Gordon
  - General Kala, in the 1980 film Flash Gordon
- Kala Shetty, villain portrayed by Rami Reddy in the 1998 Indian film Gunda

=== Films ===
- Kala (2021 film), an Indian Malayalam-language film
- Dead Time: Kala, a 2007 Indonesian film

=== Music ===
- Kala (album), by M.I.A., 2007
  - Kala Tour, the tour associated with the album
- Kala, a 2015 album by Trevor Hall
- Kala (band), a Filipino band

== Places ==
- Kala e Dodës, Albania
- El Kala, Algeria
  - El Kala District
  - El Kala National Park
- Kala, Třebotov, Czech Republic
- Kala, Republic of Dagestan
- Kala, Behshahr, Iran
- Kalah, Hormozgan, Iran
- Kala, Markazi, Iran
- Kala, Nur, Iran
- Kala, Semnan, Iran
- Kala, Kyrgyzstan
- Kala (province), historical province of Mali
- Kala/Balge, Nigeria
- Kala, Sarpsborg, Norway
- Kala Board, in Karachi, Pakistan
- Kala, Punjab, Pakistan
- Kala, Tanzania

== Other uses ==
- Kala (name), a given name and surname, including a list of people with the name
  - Kala (choreographer) (born 1971), Indian choreographer
- KALA (FM), a radio station (88.5 FM) licensed to Davenport, Iowa, United States
- Kala language, an Oceanic language of Papua New Guinea
- Kālā, the spelling in modern orthography of the native name for the Hawaiian dollar
- Kala, Hawaiian name for the bluespine unicornfish
- Kala-class utility landing craft, six former Finnish navy landing craft

== See also ==
- Kaala (disambiguation)
- Kaal (disambiguation)
- Kaala (disambiguation)
- Kaalam (disambiguation)
- Kaalpurush (disambiguation)
- Kalah, a game in the mancala family
- Kalam (disambiguation)
- Kahla (disambiguation)
- Kalaa, Algeria
- Kalas (disambiguation)
- Kalla (disambiguation)
- Cala (disambiguation)
- Qala (disambiguation) or qal'a, the Arabic word for fortress or castle
- Qalat (disambiguation), places whose names contain the words Qalat, Qelat, Kalat, Kalaat, Kalut, or Kelat
- Qila (disambiguation), a Persian (Urdu, Hindi) variant of Arabic qal'a
