= Qila, Hebron =

Qila قيلة
- Municipality type D (Village council)

Arabic transcription(s)
- Location of Qila within Palestine
- Coordinates: 31°36′58″N 35°00′11″E
- Palestine grid: 150/113
- State: State of Palestine
- Governorate: Hebron

Government
  - Type: Village council

Population (2006)
  - Total: 918
- Name meaning: Khurbet Kila, the ruin of Kila

Qila (Arabic: قيلة) is a Palestinian village located 11 kilometres (6.8 mi) north-west of Hebron. The village is in the Hebron Governorate Southern West Bank. According to the Palestinian Central Bureau of Statistics, the village had a population of 918 in mid-year 2006. The primary health care facilities for the village are at Qila designated by the Ministry of Health as level 1 and at Beit Ula, Kharas or Nuba where the healthcare is at level 2.

== History ==
Many scholars identify Qila with the biblical Keilah, mentioned in 1 Samuel.

== Bibliography ==
- Conder, C.R. (1877). "Notes from the Memoir". Quarterly Statement - Palestine Exploration Fund. 9: 85–89. (p. 86)
- Conder, C.R.; Kitchener, H.H. (1883). The Survey of Western Palestine: Memoirs of the Topography, Orography, Hydrography, and Archaeology. Vol. 3. London: Committee of the Palestine Exploration Fund. (pp. 314, 357)
- Guérin, V. (1869). Description Géographique Historique et Archéologique de la Palestine (in French). Vol. 1: Judee, pt. 3. Paris: L'Imprimerie Nationale. (Check pp. 341–343; pp. 350-351)
- Palmer, E.H. (1881). The Survey of Western Palestine: Arabic and English Name Lists Collected During the Survey by Lieutenants Conder and Kitchener, R. E. Transliterated and Explained by E.H. Palmer. Committee of the Palestine Exploration Fund.
