= Calle (name) =

Calle is a Scandinavian, mostly Swedish, masculine given name, nickname and surname that is a diminutive form of Carl and Karl and an alternate form of Kalle. Calle is also a surname. Notable people referred to by this name include the following:

== Given name ==
- Calle Asell (born 1994), Swedish ice hockey player
- Calle Brown (born 1992), American football player
- Calle Facius (born 1971), Danish football player
- Calle Järnkrok (born 1991), Swedish ice hockey player
- Calle Jonsson (born 1983), Swedish criminal suspect
- Calle Krantz (born 1997), Swedish ice hockey player
- Calle Kristiansson (born 1988), Swedish singer
- Calle Lindh (born 1990), Swedish alpine ski racer
- Calle Lindström (1868–1955), Swedish singer and comedian
- Calle Nilsson (1888–1915), Swedish long-distance athlete
- Calle Örnemark (1933–2015), Swedish artist and sculptor
- Calle Rosén (born 1994), Swedish ice hockey player
- Calle Själin (born 1999), Swedish ice hockey player

== Nickname ==
- Calle Aber Abrahamsson, a nickname of Karl Gustaf Emanuel Abrahamsson, who is also known as Carl Abrahamsson (1896–1948), Swedish athlete, bandy and ice hockey player
- Calle Halfvarsson, nickname of Carl-Christian Halfvarsson (born 1989), Swedish cross-country skier
- Calle Johansson, nickname of Carl Christian Johansson, (born 1967), Swedish ice hockey player and coach
- Calle Jularbo, nickname of Carl Jularbo, (1893–1966), Swedish accordionist
- Calle Schlettwein, nickname of Carl-Hermann Gustav Schlettwein (born 1954), Namibian politician
- Calle Steen, nickname of Carl Erik Steén (born 1980), Swedish ice hockey player
- Calle Wede, nickname of Carl Wede (born 1990), Swedish footballer

== Surname ==
- Álvaro Calle (born 1953), Colombian football player
- Antonio Calle (born 1978), known as Calle, Spanish football player
- Ed Calle, Venezuelan musician
- Elkin Calle (born 1980), Colombian football player
- Eugenia Calle (1952–2009), American cancer epidemiologist
- Ignacio Calle (1931–1982), Colombian football player
- Javier Calle (born 1991), Colombian football player
- Johanna Calle (born 1965), Colombian artist
- José Calle (1945–2020), French rugby football player
- María Elena Calle (born 1975), Ecuadorian marathon runner
- María Luisa Calle (born 1968), Colombian cyclist
- María Victoria Calle (1959–2025), Colombian lawyer, justice of the Constitutional Court
- Paul Calle (1928–2010), American artist
- Pierre Calle (1889–?), Belgian fencer
- Renán Calle (born 1976), Ecuadorian football
- Rodolfo Calle (born 1964), Bolivian politician
- Sophie Calle (born 1953), French writer, photographer, installation artist, and conceptual artist
- William Calle (born 1946), Peruvian army general and politician

== Middle name ==
- María Victoria Calle Correa (born 1959), Colombian Magistrate

== See also ==
- Calle (disambiguation)
- Cale (name)
- Call (surname)
- Calla (name)
- Carle, surnames
- Carle (given name)
- Colle (surname)
- Kalle, given name
