= Eerola =

Eerola is a Finnish surname. Notable people with the surname include:

- Albert Eerola (1874–1950), Finnish farmer and politician
- Juho Eerola (born 1975), Finnish politician
- Kalle Eerola (born 1983), Finnish football player
- Ville-Veikko Eerola (born 1992), Finnish ice hockey player
