= Djibasso Department =

Coordinates: 13°07′00″N 4°10′00″W

Djibasso
- Department
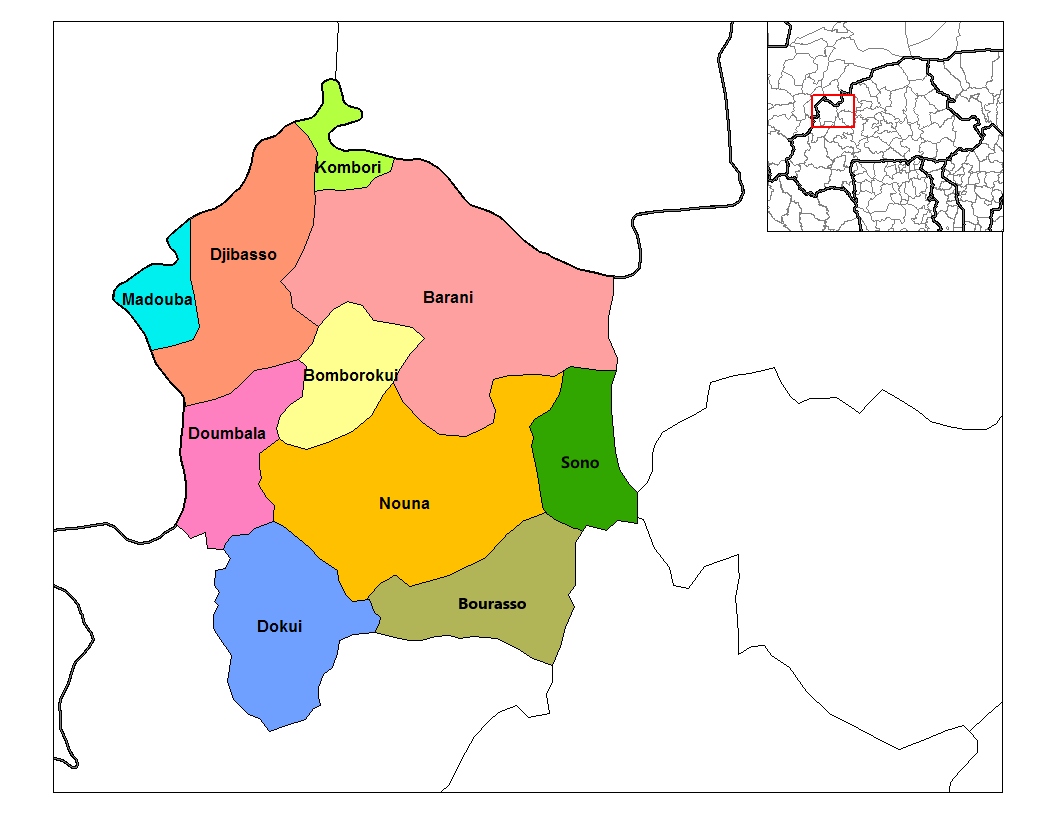
- Djibasso Department location in the province
- Country: Burkina Faso
- Province: Kossi Province

Area
  - Total: 330.7 sq mi (856.5 km^{2})

Population (2019 census)
  - Total: 63,283
  - Density: 191.4/sq mi (73.89/km^{2})
- Time zone: UTC+0 (GMT 0)

Djibasso is a department or commune of Kossi Province in western Burkina Faso. Its capital lies at the town of Djibasso. According to the 2019 census the department has a total population of 63,283.

== Towns and villages ==
| Populated Place | Population | Sub-Prefecture |
|---|---|---|
| Djibasso | 5 326 | Djibasso Subprefecture |
| Ba | 2 084 | Djibasso Subprefecture |
| Banana | 373 | Djibasso Subprefecture |
| Bankoumana | 489 | Djibasso Subprefecture |
| Bara | 565 | Bara Subprefecture |
| Berkoué | 746 | Bara Subprefecture |
| Bida | 718 | Bara Subprefecture |
| Bokoro | 163 | Bara Subprefecture |
| Bonoua | 400 | Bara Subprefecture |
| Bouakuy | 857 | Bara Subprefecture |
| Diékan | 404 | Diékan Subprefecture |
| Diekuini | 413 | Bara Subprefecture |
| Diena | 1 634 | Bara Subprefecture |
| Donkoro | 197 | Diékan Subprefecture |
| Foni-Boronkin | 688 | Diékan Subprefecture |
| Gnimini | 852 | Diékan Subprefecture |
| Ira | 3 038 | Diékan Subprefecture |
| Kansara | 561 | Diékan Subprefecture |
| Kié | 2 248 | Djibasso Subprefecture |
| Kira | 987 | Djibasso Subprefecture |
| Kolonkan | 611 | Kolonzo Subprefecture |
| Kolonkani-Sirakoro | 562 | Kolonzo Subprefecture |
| Kolonzo | 622 | Kolonzo Subprefecture |
| Kombori | 1 519 | Kombori Subprefecture |
| Maoulena | 837 | Kolonzo Subprefecture |
| Mandara | 777 | Kolonzo Subprefecture |
| Massakuy | 250 | Kolonzo Subprefecture |
| Mouna | 90 | Kolonzo Subprefecture |
| Nairena | 1 067 | Kolonzo Subprefecture |
| Ouarokuy | 1 026 | Kolonzo Subprefecture |
| Oura | 2 482 | Kolonzo Subprefecture |
| Parakuy | 253 | Parakuy Subprefecture |
| Paranzo | 433 | Parakuy Subprefecture |
| Pia n° 1 | 2 552 | Parakuy Subprefecture |
| Saba | 1 737 | Parakuy Subprefecture |
| Sadignakono | 365 | Parakuy Subprefecture |
| Sakuy | 328 | Parakuy Subprefecture |
| Samekuy | 941 | Parakuy Subprefecture |
| Sarakoro | 1 252 | Parakuy Subprefecture |
| Senoulo | 35 | Parakuy Subprefecture |
| Siedougou | 196 | Parakuy Subprefecture |
| Soumoukuy | 284 | Parakuy Subprefecture |
| Sounè | 684 | Parakuy Subprefecture |
| Soye | 2 346 | Parakuy Subprefecture |
| Tiemè | 1984 | Parakuy Subprefecture |
| Voro | 698 | Kolonzo Subprefecture |
