= Kalle =

- Gender: Male or female, depending on meaning

Origin
- Region of origin: Northern Europe

Other names
- Related names: Karl

Kalle is a masculine given name of North Germanic origin, a variation of Karl. In Sweden, people named Karl are commonly nicknamed Kalle. The name is also found in Finland and Estonia. Notable people with the name include:

== Given name ==
- Kalle Anttila (1887–1975), Finnish freestyle and Greco-Roman wrestler and Olympic medalist
- Kalle Bask (born 1982), Finnish sailor and Olympic competitor
- Kalle Björklund (born 1953), Swedish footballer
- Kalle Brink (born 1975), Swedish professional golfer
- Kalle Coster (born 1982), Dutch sailor and Olympic medalist
- Kalle Dalin (born 1975), Swedish orienteering competitor
- Kalle Eerola (born 1983), Finnish professional football midfielder
- Kalle Eller (1940–2023), Estonian poet, publisher, neopagan and writer
- Kalle Ericsson (born 2004), Canadian para-alpine skier
- Kalle Grundel (born 1948), Swedish rally driver
- Kalle Grünthal (born 1960), Estonian politician
- Kalle Hakala (1880-1947), Finnish politician
- Kalle Havulinna (1924–2016), Finnish professional ice hockey player
- Kalle Jalkanen (1907–1941), Finnish cross-country skier and Olympic medalist
- Kalle Jents (born 1957), Estonian politician
- Kalle Jürgenson (born 1960), Estonian astrophysicist and politician
- Kalle Kaijomaa (born 1984), Finnish ice hockey defenceman
- Kalle Kainuvaara (1891–1943), Finnish diver and Olympic competitor
- Kalle Kaljurand (born 1960), Estonian badminton player
- Kalle Kankari (1889-1948), Finnish politician
- Kalle Kasemaa (born 1942), Estonian theologian, Lutheran pastor and literary translator
- Kalle Käsper (born 1952), Estonian author
- Kalle Katajisto (born 1991), Finnish motorcycle speedway rider
- Kalle Kauppi (footballer) (born 1992), Finnish footballer
- Kalle Keituri (born 1984), Finnish ski jumper and Olympic competitor
- Kalle Kiik (born 1963), Estonian chess player and coach
- Kalle Kiiskinen (born 1975), Finnish curler and Olympic competitor
- Kalle Könkkölä (1950–2018), Finnish politician
- Kalle Korhonen (1878–1938), Finnish politician
- Kalle Kriit (born 1983), Estonian professional racing cyclist
- Kalle Kulbok (born 1956), Estonian politician
- Kalle Kurg (born 1942), Estonian poet, writer, critic, translator and editor
- Kalle Laanet (born 1965), Estonian politician
- Kalle Lappalainen (1877–1965), Finnish sport shooter and Olympic medalist
- Kalle Larsson (born 1969), Swedish politician
- Kalle Lasn (born 1942), Estonian-born Canadian film maker, author, magazine editor and activist
- Kalle Lassila (born 1985), Finnish cross country skier and Olympic competitor
- Kalle Maalahti (born 1991), Finnish professional ice hockey player
- Kalle Mäkinen (born 1989), Finnish footballer
- Kalle Mattson (born 1990), Canadian musician
- Kalle Mikkonen (born 1976), Finnish sprint canoer and Olympic competitor
- Kalle Moraeus (born 1963), Swedish musician
- Kalle Muuli (born 1958), Estonian journalist, poet and politician
- Kalle Multanen (born 1989), Finnish professional footballer
- Kalle Nämdeman (1883–1945), Swedish songwriter, performer and recording artist
- Kalle Olsson (born 1984), Swedish politician
- Kalle Olsson (ice hockey) (born 1985), Swedish professional ice hockey player
- Kalle Päätalo, (1919–2000), Finnish novelist
- Kalle Palander (born 1977), Finnish alpine skier
- Kalle Palling (born 1985), Estonian politician
- Kalle Parviainen (born 1982), Finnish football striker
- Kalle Randalu (born 1956), Estonian pianist
- Kalle Rovanperä (born 2000), Finnish rally driver
- Kalle Samuelsson (born 1986), Swedish Bandy player
- Kalle Spjuth (born 1984), Swedish Bandy player
- Kalle Svensson (1925–2000), Swedish football goalkeeper
- Kalle Tuppurainen (1904–1954), Finnish skier and Olympic competitor
- Kalle Varonen (born 1974), Finnish freestyle swimmer
- Kalle Vellevoog (born 1963), Estonian architect
- Kalle Westerdahl (born 1966), Swedish film and television actor
- Kalle Westerlund (1897–1972), Finnish wrestler and Olympic medalist

Fictional characters:

- Kalle, a fictional Finnish talk show host portrayed by Kristen Wiig on Saturday Night Live
- Kalle Anka, the Swedish name for Donald Duck
- Kalle Blomkvist, a fictional character created by Astrid Lindgren; see Bill Bergson

== Surname ==
- Maya Kalle-Bentzur (born 1958), Israeli Olympic runner and long jumper
- Wilhelm Ferdinand Kalle (1870-1954), German chemist, industrialist and politician

== Stage name ==
- Le Grand Kallé, a Congolese musician
- Pépé Kallé, a Congolese musician

== See also ==
- Calle (name)
- Kale (name)
- Kalla (name)
- Kalli (name)
- Kallu (name)
