= Abaye, Burkina Faso =

Town in Boucle du Mouhoun, Burkina Faso

Abaye
- Rural commune
- Location in Burkina Faso
- Coordinates: 13°26′26.9″N 3°54′06.8″W
- Country: Burkina Faso
- Region: Boucle du Mouhoun Region
- Province: Kossi Province
- Department: Kombori Department

Population (2019)
  - Total: 161

Abaye is a populated place located in the Kombori Department, Kossi Province, Boucle du Mouhoun Region in Burkina Faso.
