= ARTBO =

Annual art fair in Bogotá, Colombia

- Genre: Arts fair; contemporary art Arts program
- Frequency: Annual
- Locations: Ágora Bogotá, Bogotá, Colombia
- Years active: 21 years
- Inaugurated: 24 October 2007
- Attendance: 29,560 (2024)
- Organiser: Chamber of Commerce of Bogotá
- Website: www.artbo.co

ARTBO is the arts program of the Bogotá Chamber of Commerce, since 2004 the program aims to promote the plastic arts ecosystem in Colombia. The program has different actions lines that includes ARTBO Fair, ARTBO Fin de Semana, ARTBO Salas, ARTBO Tutor and Trama. ARTBO Fair is Colombia's official international art fair, and is organized by the Bogotá Chamber of commerce. ARTBO is one of the largest art fairs in Latin America, and brings together art galleries, artworks, curators, collectors, artists, and the public as one of the most important cultural events for the country.

== History ==
The fair's origins date back to 2004, when Bogotá's Chamber of Commerce took on the project of strengthening and consolidating the local art scene. ARTBO was created as a nonprofit project to promote Colombia's culture and arts both locally and abroad through the participation of key Colombian art galleries as well as international galleries.

Since 2012, under the direction of María Paz Gaviria, ARTBO Fair has grown in size to becoming Latin America's second largest art fair, next to Zona Maco in Mexico. Internationally, ARTBO Fair is sometimes referred to as the "Art Basel of Latin America".

== Editions ==
- ARTBO 2005 – Inaugural edition; 29 galleries from 7 countries
- ARTBO 2012 – New Director Maria Paz Gaviria takes over direction of ArtBo; 56 galleries from 14 countries
- ARTBO 2015 – 11th Edition; 3000 artworks and 84 galleries from 33 cities
- ARTBO 2016 – 12th Edition; 35,000 visitors and galleries from 28 cities, and accounted for 80% of the total annual sale volume for Colombian Art Galleries that year
- ARTBO 2017 – 13th Edition; 75 participating galleries and over 350 represented artists
- ARTBO 2018 – 14th Edition; 3000 artworks from over 350 represented artists
