= Kalla (name) =

Kalla, Kállá or Källa is a given name and surname. It is a Danish, Finnish, Icelandic and Swedish feminine given name that is a feminine form of Kalle, short form of Karolina and an alternate form of Karla. Kalla is also an English feminine given name, but its derived from the Greek root name Kalós. Kállá is a Sami masculine given name that is an alternate form of Kalle. Notable people who are known by this name include the following:

== Given name ==
- Kalla Ankourao, Nigerien politician
- Källa Bie (born 1974), Swedish actress
- Kalla Gertze (1960–2008), Namibian politician
- Kalla Pasha (1879–1933), American wrestler, vaudeville comedian, and film actor

== Surname ==
- Bulaki Das Kalla (born 1949), Indian politician
- Charlotte Kalla (born 1987), Swedish cross-country skier
- Daniel Kalla (born 1966), Canadian author and physician
- Jan-Philipp Kalla (born 1986), German football player
- Jaroslav Kalla (born 1979), Czech ice hockey player
- Jusuf Kalla (born 1942), Indonesian politician
- Lachhmi Dhar Kalla, Indian scholar
- Marcel Kalla, Congolese politician
- Raymond Kalla (born 1975), Cameroonian football player

== See also ==
- Kalla (disambiguation)
- Calla (name)
- Kala (name)
- Kalle
- Kalli (name)
- Kallu (name)
- Karla (name)
- Kayla (name)
