= FDJ =

FDJ may refer to:

- FDJ, or Française des Jeux, a French cycling team, now Groupama–FDJ, sponsored by Française des Jeux (FDJ)
- Faculty Dental Journal, a scholarly journal, published by the Royal College of Surgeons of England Faculty of Dental Surgery
- Française des Jeux, the operator of the French national lottery, now FDJ United
- Free German Youth (German: Freie Deutsche Jugend), a German youth movement of the German Democratic Republic (GDR)
  - Freie Deutsche Jugend, a German-language song by Swedish student band IFA Wartburg
- Frenkie de Jong, a Dutch football player
- Fdj or sometimes FDj, Djiboutian franc (French: franc Djibouti, or franc djiboutien), whose ISO 4217 currency code is DJF
