= Uppland Runic Inscription 258 =

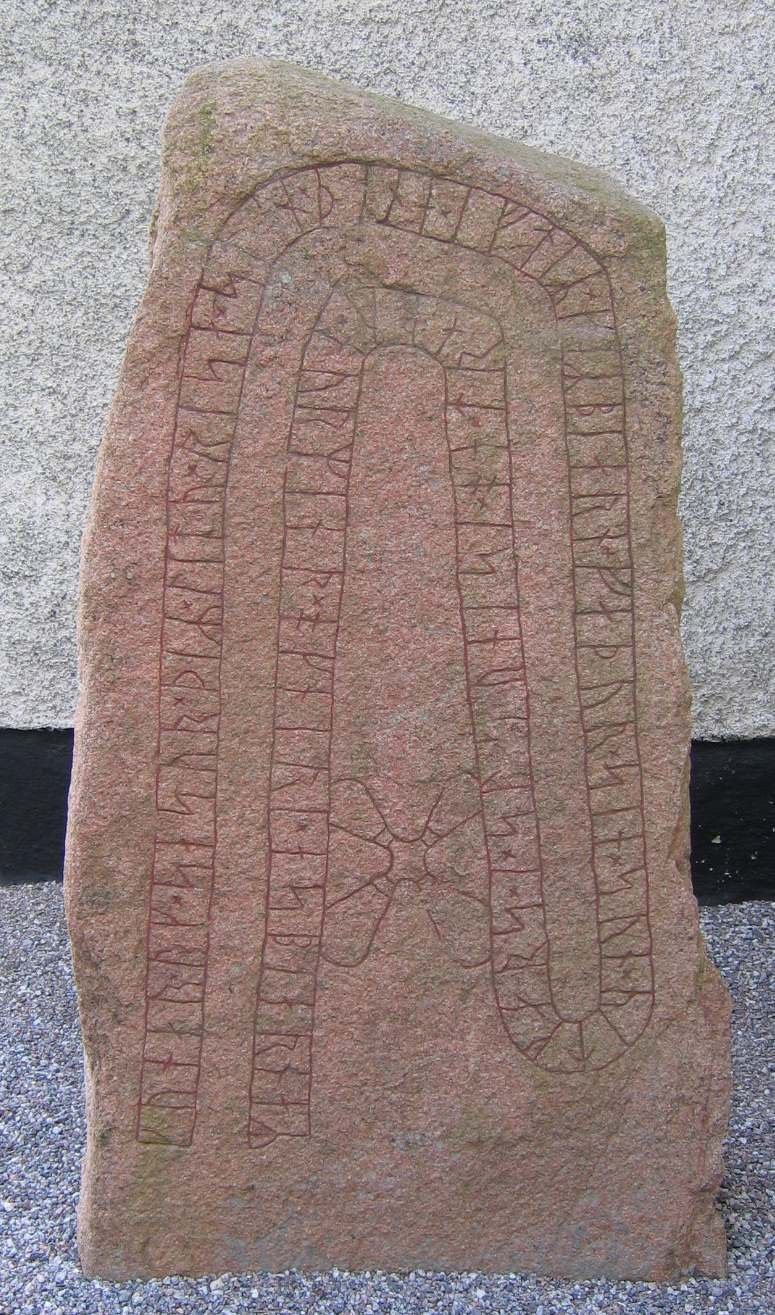
U 258

The Uppland Runic Inscription 258 is a Viking Age runestone engraved in Old Norse with the Younger Futhark runic alphabet. It is in granite and located at Fresta Church in Upplands Väsby Municipality.

== Inscription ==
kunar × uk × sasur × þiʀ × litu × risa × stin × þina × iftiʀ × kiʀbi(a)rn × faþur × sin × sun × ui(t)kars × i × (s)u--unisi × on × trabu × nurminr × o kniri × asbiarnaʀ
Gunnarr {} ok {} Sassurr {} þæiʀ {} letu {} ræisa {} stæin {} þenna {} æftiʀ {} Gæiʀbiorn, {} faður {} sinn, {} sun {} Vittkarls/Hvitkars {} i {} Sv[al]unæsi(?). {} Hann {} drapu {} norrmænnr {} a knærri {} Asbiarnaʀ.
"Gunnarr and Sassurr, they had this stone raised in memory of Geirbjôrn, their father, Vittkarl/Hvítkarr of Svalunes's son. Norwegians killed him on Ásbjôrn's cargo-ship."

== See also ==
- List of runestones
