= Bankuy =

- Village
- Country: Burkina Faso
- Region: Boucle du Mouhoun
- Province: Kossi Province
- Department: Doumbala Department

Population (2003)
  - Total: 142
- Time zone: UTC+0 (GMT 0)

Bankuy is a commune located in the Doumbala Department of Kossi Province, Burkina Faso.
