= Sono Department =

Coordinates: 12°50′N 3°29′W

Sono
- Department
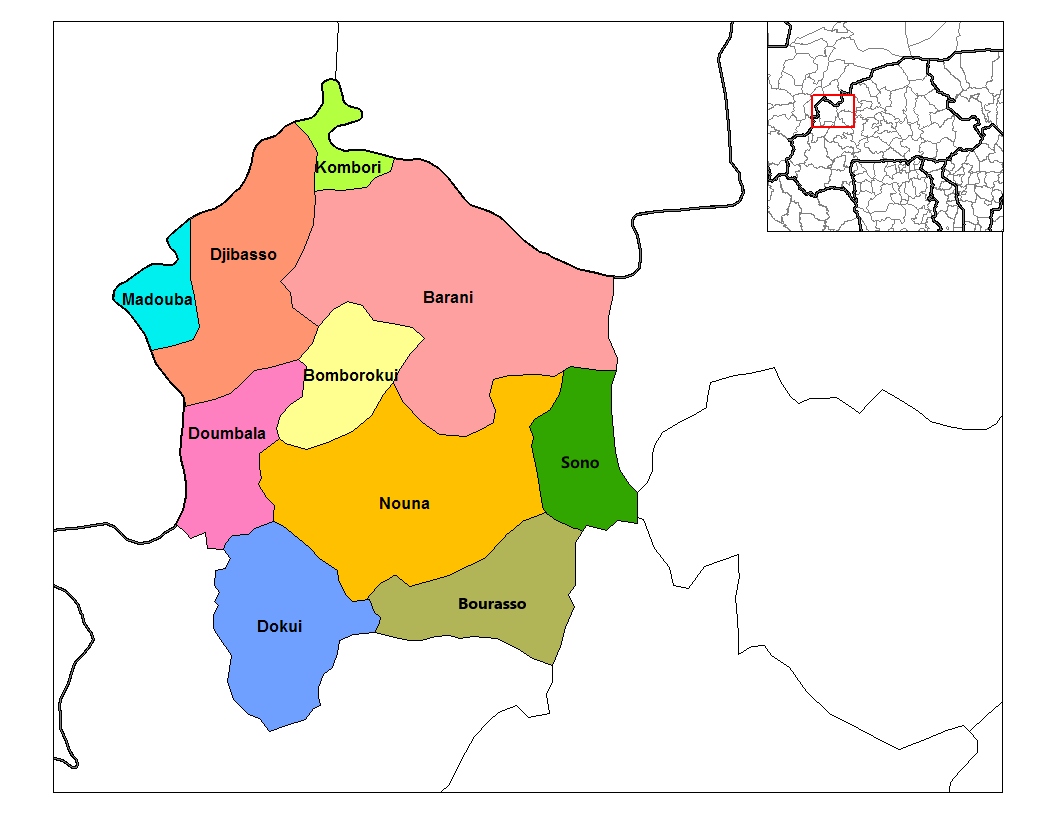
- Sono Department location in the province
- Country: Burkina Faso
- Province: Kossi Province

Area
  - Total: 150.4 sq mi (389.5 km^{2})

Population (2019 census)
  - Total: 10,115
  - Density: 67.26/sq mi (25.97/km^{2})
- Time zone: UTC+0 (GMT 0)

Sono is a department of Kossi Province in western Burkina Faso. It is in the Boucle du Mouhoun Region. The capital of the department is Sono. The population of the department in 2019 was 10,115.

== Towns and villages ==
- Sono (3 241 inhabitants) (Capital)
- Bantombo (571 inhabitants)
- Botte (302 inhabitants)
- Dankoumana (790 inhabitants)
- Kallé (812 inhabitants)
- Koury (713 inhabitants)
- Lanfiera-koura (67 inhabitants)
- Siéla (460 inhabitants)
- Soro (241 inhabitants)
- Zampana (123 inhabitants)
