= J Stoner Blackwell =

American artist

J Stoner Blackwell, known as Josh Blackwell, is an American artist and teacher from New Orleans, Louisiana.

== Education ==
Blackwell received his MFA from the California Institute of Art and a BA at Bennington College. He is on the faculty at Bennington College, starting at a visiting faculty member in 2009 and joining the faculty in 2016.

== Work ==
Blackwell was trained as a painter and now works in mixed media, creating works he calls 'Neveruses'. These are paintings and objects created from plastic bags with colored fibers on them. In November 2017 his installation called Josh Blackwell: Neveruses Report Progress was on display at the Education Department's MAD Process Lab. His influences range from the Italian futurists to folk and outsider art.

== Exhibits ==
His solo exhibits have taken place in New York, London, Los Angeles and Paris. He showed at New York's Rachel Uffner Gallery. He has shown at Ratio 3 in San Francisco (2019), Galeria Casas Riegner in Columbia (2018), Children's Museum of the Arts in New York (2017), Venus Over Los Angeles in Los Angeles (2016), Salon 94 in New York (2013), Mackintosh Museum, Glasgow School of Art (2013), Galerie Chez Valentin, Paris (2012), Riverside Art Museum, California (2011), Museum Bellerive, Switzerland (2011), Tanja Pol Galerie, Germany (2011) and others.

== Honors and awards ==
In 2020 he was awarded a Guggenheim Fellowship. In 2016 he was awarded a residency fellowship from the Josef & Anni Albers Foundation. In 2014 he received a Pollock-Krasner Foundation grant. He has received other fellowships from ZK\U Berlin, the Santa Fe Art Institute and Delfina Studio Trust.
