= Dokuy Department =

Coordinates: 12°33′00″N 4°07′00″W

Dokuy
- Department
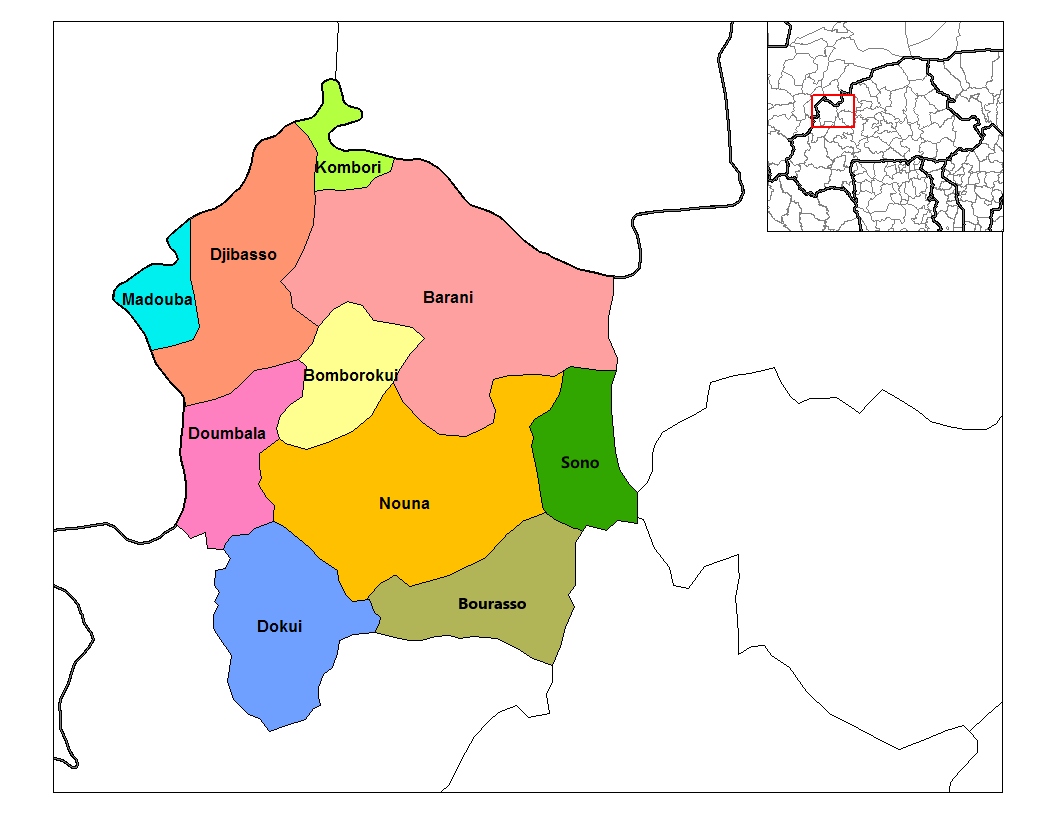
- Dokuy Department location in the province
- Country: Burkina Faso
- Province: Kossi Province

Area
  - Total: 295.8 sq mi (766.1 km^{2})

Population (2019 census)
  - Total: 40,588
  - Density: 137.2/sq mi (52.98/km^{2})
- Time zone: UTC+0 (GMT 0)

Dokuy or Dokui is a department or commune of Kossi Province in western Burkina Faso. Its capital lies at the town of Dokuy. According to the 1996 census the department has a total population of 40,588.

== Towns and villages ==
- Dokuy (3 160 inhabitants) (capital)
- Ayoubakolon (1 075 inhabitants)
- Bonikuy (787 inhabitants)
- Dar-Es-Salam (635 inhabitants)
- Dassi (787 inhabitants)
- Denissa-Marka (366 inhabitants)
- Denissa-Mossi (336 inhabitants)
- Dokoura (403 inhabitants)
- Doubalé (432 inhabitants)
- Gassingo (1 589 inhabitants)
- Goni (2 402 inhabitants)
- Ilabekolon (1 037 inhabitants)
- Kamadena (1 549 inhabitants)
- Kanadougou (1 156 inhabitants)
- Karasso (1 107 inhabitants)
- Kemenso (653 inhabitants)
- Kenekuy (2 324 inhabitants)
- Kolonidara (949 inhabitants)
- Kolonkoura (890 inhabitants)
- Makuy (536 inhabitants)
- Nereko (1 210 inhabitants)
- Sokoura (573 inhabitants)
- Soumakoro (498 inhabitants)
- Soum (591 inhabitants)
- Tomikoroni (260 inhabitants)
