= Barani, Burkina Faso =

Coordinates: 13°10′07.3″N 3°53′35.1″W

Barani
- Interactive map of Barani
- Country: Burkina Faso
- Region: Boucle du Mouhoun
- Province: Kossi Province
- Department: Barani Department

Population (2005)
  - Total: 4,804
- Time zone: UTC+0 (GMT 0)

Barani is the capital of the Barani Department of Kossi Province in western Burkina Faso. As of 2005 it had a population of 4,804.
