= Infra City =

Hotel in Upplands Väsby, Stockholm, Sweden

Coordinates: 59°29′58.7″N 17°55′42.9″E

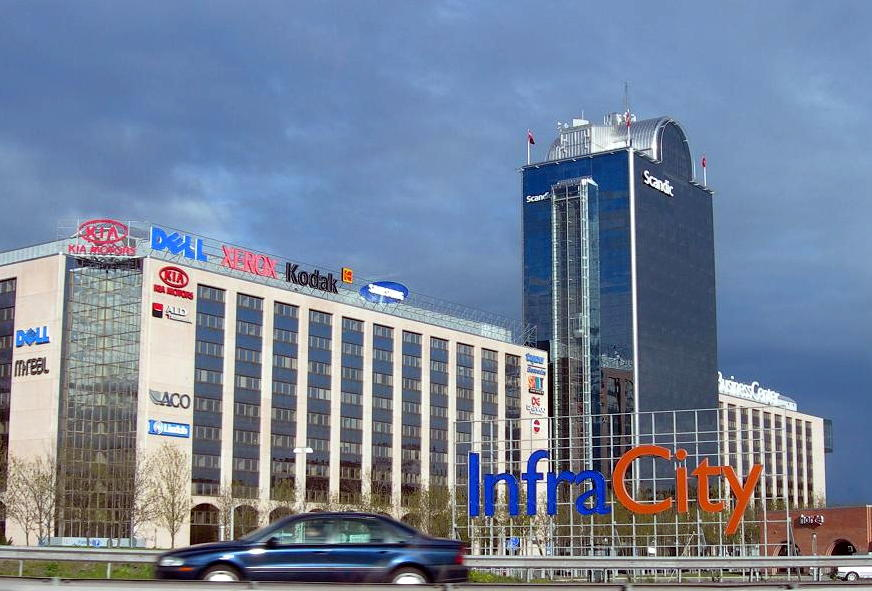
Infra City in Upplands Väsby

Infra City is a 70 metres tall skyscraper hotel in Upplands Väsby in Stockholm.
