= List of art galleries in Colombia =

This is a list of Colombian art galleries.

== Art galleries in Bogotá, Colombia ==
In alphabetical order

- Alcuadrado, Bogotá – Opened in 2003. A space for contemporary art.
- Galería Alonso Garcés, Bogotá – Opened in 1977. Formerly known as Garcés Velazquez Gallery today Alonso Garcés Gallery has led the way in the promotion of Colombian and International art. The Gallery is committed to the education of the public via International art Fairs.
- Beatriz Esguerra Art, Bogotá – Opened in 2000. This gallery promotes the work of Colombian and international contemporary artists on a national and international level.
- Galería Casas Riegner, Bogotá – Opened in 2005. Casas Riegner is one of Colombian top art galleries. It promotes contemporary Colombian art at an international level.
- DeimosArte, Bogotá – Opened in 1973. Although this gallery mixes interior architecture, artistic design and fine art, the artworks shown at the gallery are carefully selected to promote top quality.
- Galería El Museo, Bogotá – This gallery promotes well-established artists, an intermediate generation, and emerging Colombian and Latin American artists.
- Galería MÜ, Bogotá – The first and only Colombian gallery for fine-art photography presents emerging, mid-career, and established art photographers from Colombia and the international market.
- Galeria Sextante – This gallery hosts graphic art workshops and promotes the development of contemporary Latin American Artists
- Instituto de Vision – This gallery is run by director Beatriz Lopez who promotes a program of public art focusing on original perspectives and micro-revolutions
- La Central, Bogotá – New cultural and artistic space that gives room to original work and promotes collaboration between Colombian and international artists.
- LA Galería, Bogotá – Promotes contemporary Colombian and Latin American art.
- Nueveochenta, Bogotá – Opened in 2007. Promotes contemporary Latin American art making a strong emphasis to consolidate a group of Colombian artists on a national and international level.
- Valenzuela Klenner Galería, Bogotá – Opened in 1989. Promotes contemporary Latin American art with a strong emphasis on Colombian-produced artworks.

== Art galleries in Cali, Colombia ==
- Jenny Vilá, Cali – Opened in 1987. The gallery supports the exhibition, promotion and diffusion of contemporary art.
