= Calla (name) =

Calla is a Greek feminine given name and surname given name that is a short Calista Kalla. Calla is also an English feminine given name, but its derived from the Greek root name Kalós. Calla is an Irish feminine given name that is a diminutive form of Caoileann. Notable people who are known by this name include the following:

== Given name ==
- Calla Curman (1850–1935), Swedish writer, salon-holder and feminist
- Calla Urbanski (born 1960), American pair skater

== Surname ==
- Davide Callà (born 1975), Cameroonian football player

== Fictional character ==
- Calla from the Calla Lily (TV series)
- Princess Calla from Disney's Adventures of the Gummi Bears
- Calla, a merchant from V.E. Schwab's Shades of Magic trilogy

== See also ==
- Calla (disambiguation)
- Carla
- Call (surname)
- Callao
- Callan (disambiguation)
- Calle (name)
- Kalla (name)
