= Doumbala Department =

Coordinates: 12°55′00″N 4°10′00″W

Doumbala
- Department
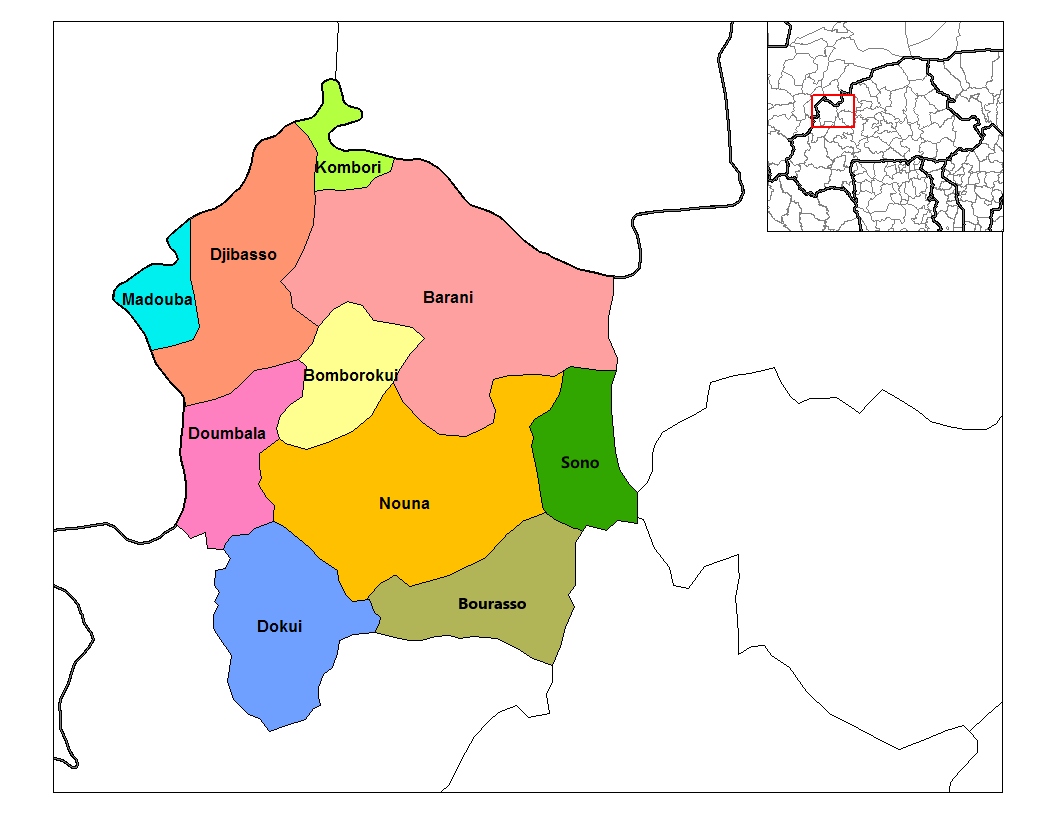
- Doumbala Department location in the province
- Country: Burkina Faso
- Province: Kossi Province

Area
  - Total: 186.1 sq mi (482.1 km^{2})

Population (2019)
  - Total: 33,326
  - Density: 179.0/sq mi (69.13/km^{2})
- Time zone: UTC+0 (GMT 0)

Doumbala is a department or commune of Kossi Province in western Burkina Faso. Its capital lies at the town of Doumbala. According to the 2019 census the department has a total population of 33,326.

== Towns and villages ==
- Doumbala (1 897 inhabitants) (capital)
- Bamperla (579 inhabitants)
- Bangassi-Bobo (498 inhabitants)
- Bangassi-Illa (1 333 inhabitants)
- Bangassi-Mamoudoud (334 inhabitants)
- Bankuy (142 inhabitants)
- Bassam (169 inhabitants)
- Boanekuy (793 inhabitants)
- Bokuy (212 inhabitants)
- Boukuy (409 inhabitants)
- Dakuy (864 inhabitants)
- Henlekuy (615 inhabitants)
- Karekuy (440 inhabitants)
- Kimba (279 inhabitants)
- Kini-Kini (171 inhabitants)
- Koa (1 133 inhabitants)
- Kodara (1 291 inhabitants)
- Kolonzo (1 291 inhabitants)
- Konkuy-Boho (306 inhabitants)
- Konkuy-Koro (1 589 inhabitants)
- Kourkuy (334 inhabitants)
- Lanfiera (528 inhabitants)
- Montionkuy (734 inhabitants)
- Mounakoro (1 501 inhabitants)
- Nian (1 815 inhabitants)
- Porokuy (361 inhabitants)
- Saint-Camille (285 inhabitants)
- Saint-Martin (785 inhabitants)
- Saint-Paul (157 inhabitants)
- Saworokuy (405 inhabitants)
- Simbora (1 066 inhabitants)
- Teni (1 878 inhabitants)
- Teni-Peulh (267 inhabitants)
- Tiourkuy (249 inhabitants)
- Wanzan (465 inhabitants)
- Zekuy (949 inhabitants)
