= Barani Department =

Coordinates: 13°10′00″N 3°53′00″W

Barani
- Department
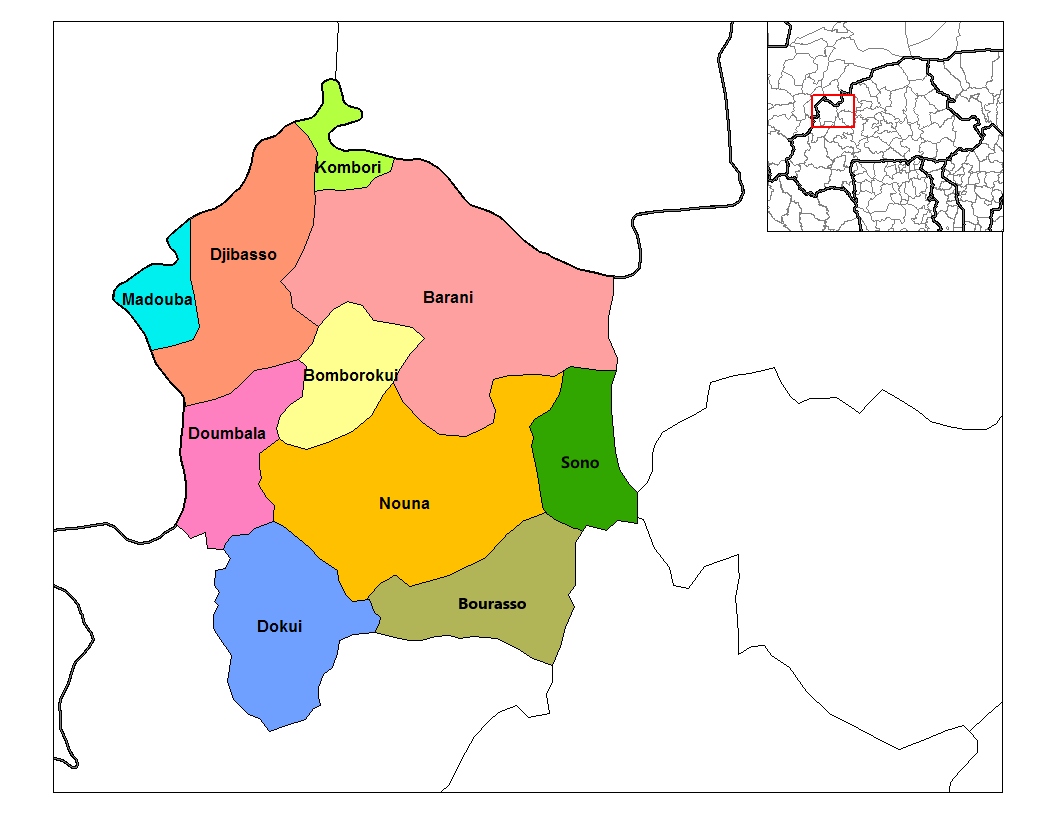
- Barani Department location in the province
- Country: Burkina Faso
- Province: Kossi Province

Population (1996)
  - Total: 49,144
- Time zone: UTC+0 (GMT 0)

Barani is a department or commune of Kossi Province in western Burkina Faso. Its capital lies at the town of Barani. According to the 1996 census, the department has a total population of 49,144.

The department of Barani borders the country of Mali to the north. The village of Barani is most well known as the site of an annual horse festival. It can be reached via a road heading north from the village of Bomborokui.

== Towns and villages ==
- Barani (4 804 inhabitants) (capital)
- Babakuy (1 094 inhabitants)
- Bangassi-Koro (420 inhabitants)
- Bangassi Kourou (4 804 inhabitants)
- Berma (1 450 inhabitants)
- Bogo (327 inhabitants)
- Boulé (491 inhabitants)
- Boulemporo (1 397 inhabitants)
- Cissé (918 inhabitants)
- Diamahoun (1 348 inhabitants)
- Djallo (510 inhabitants)
- Dienwely (534 inhabitants)
- Douré (413 inhabitants)
- Illa (1 633 inhabitants)
- Kamandadougou (1 068 inhabitants)
- Karekuy (1 003 inhabitants)
- Kessekuy (1 053 inhabitants)
- Kinseré (1 334 inhabitants)
- Kolonkan Goure Ba (616 inhabitants)
- Kolonkan Goure Diall (1 293 inhabitants)
- Konkoro (594 inhabitants)
- Koroni (762 inhabitants)
- Koubé (575 inhabitants)
- Koulerou (1 978 inhabitants)
- Manekuy (576 inhabitants)
- Mantamou (1 086 inhabitants)
- Medougou (1 766 inhabitants)
- Nabasso (881 inhabitants)
- Niako (479 inhabitants)
- Niemini-Peulh (137 inhabitants)
- Gnimanou (2 176 inhabitants)
- Ouemboye (382 inhabitants)
- Oueressé (1 384 inhabitants)
- Pampakuy (559 inhabitants)
- Sekuy (576 inhabitants)
- Sekuy-Ira (62 inhabitants)
- Sokoura (2 280 inhabitants)
- Soudogo (670 inhabitants)
- Tira (779 inhabitants)
- Torokoto (2 991 inhabitants)
- Waribèrè (961 inhabitants)
- Yalankoro (980 inhabitants)
