= Kala (name) =

Kala is a given name and surname. Notable people with the name include:

== Given name ==
- Kala (choreographer) (born 1971), Indian choreographer
- Kala (TikToker), American TikToker
- Kala Alexander (born 1969), American surfer and actor

== Surname ==
- Advaita Kala, Indian Writer
- Aivar Kala (born 1957), Estonian politician
- Annegret Kala (born 2006), Estonian footballer
- Anirudh Kala, psychiatrist based in Ludhiana, India
- Brijendra Kala, Indian film actor
- Chandra Prakash Kala, Indian ecologist
- Hemlata Kala (born 1975), Indian cricketer
- Hüseyin Kala (born 1987), Turkish footballer
- Itzik Kala, Israeli singer
- Kala Ramnath (born 1967), Indian violinist
- Kala Venkata Rao (1900–1959), Indian freedom fighter and politician
- Kala Nath Shastry (born 1936), Indian Sanskrit scholar
- Risto Kala (1941–2021), Finnish basketball player

== See also ==
- Kala (disambiguation)
- Kaja (name)
- Kali (name)
- Kalla (name)
