= Bomborokui Department =

Coordinates: 12°56′N 3°58′W

Bomborokui
- Department
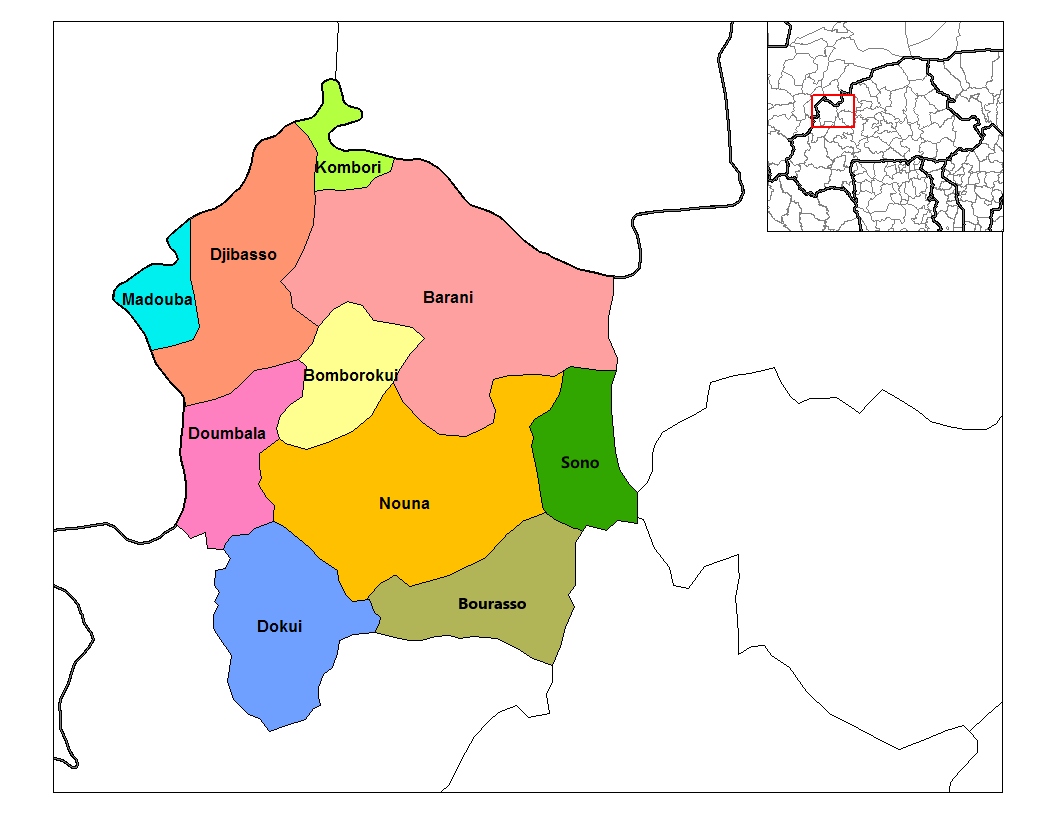
- Bomborokui Department location in the province
- Country: Burkina Faso
- Province: Kossi Province

Population (1996)
  - Total: 13,298
- Time zone: UTC+0 (GMT 0)

Bomborokui or Bomborokuy is a department or commune of Kossi Province in western Burkina Faso. Its capital lies at the town of Bomborokui. According to the 1996 census the department has a total population of 13,298.

The primary ethnic group of Bomborokuy are the Bwaba people. Their language is Bwamu. However, most people in Bomborokuy also speak the common regional trade language of Jula. In Bwamu, the name "Bomborokuy" is pronounced "Boh-we" and means "village of the dog."

== Towns and villages ==
- Bomborokuy (3 837 inhabitants) (capital)
- Banakoro (996 inhabitants)
- Bogo (374 inhabitants)
- Danekuy (415 inhabitants)
- Gombèlé (765 inhabitants)
- Komonkuy (528 inhabitants)
- Mariasso (431 inhabitants)
- Sadigan (481 inhabitants)
- Sako (406 inhabitants)
- Tirakuy (845 inhabitants)
- Yabana (221 inhabitants)
- Yallo (735 inhabitants)
- Yevedougou (1 154 inhabitants)
- Borekuy (992 inhabitants)
- Niankouini (638 inhabitants)
- Souankuy (480 inhabitants)
