= Madouba Department =

Coordinates: 13°19′N 3°51′W

Madouba
- Department
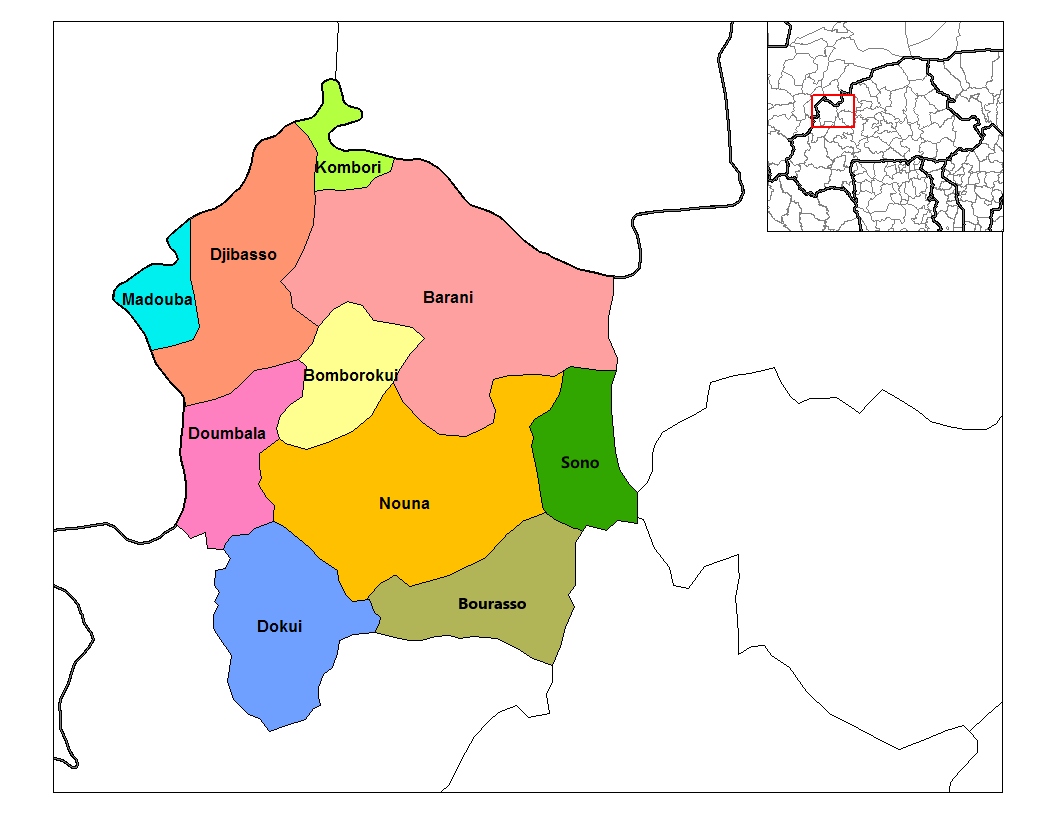
- Madouba Department location in the province
- Country: Burkina Faso
- Province: Kossi Province

Population (1996)
  - Total: 5,949
- Time zone: UTC+0 (GMT 0)

Madouba is a department or commune of Kossi Province in western Burkina Faso. Its capital lies at the town of Madouba. According to the 1996 census the department has a total population of 5,949.

== Towns and villages ==
- Madouba (265 inhabitants) (capital)
- Bankoumani (599 inhabitants)
- Bokuy (425 inhabitants)
- Dina (327 inhabitants)
- Kiko (368 inhabitants)
- Kolokan (1 502 inhabitants)
- Pia n°2 (871 inhabitants)
- Poro (417 inhabitants)
- Touba (873 inhabitants)
- Yourouna (302 inhabitants)
