= Upplands Väsby =

Urban area on the east coast of Sweden

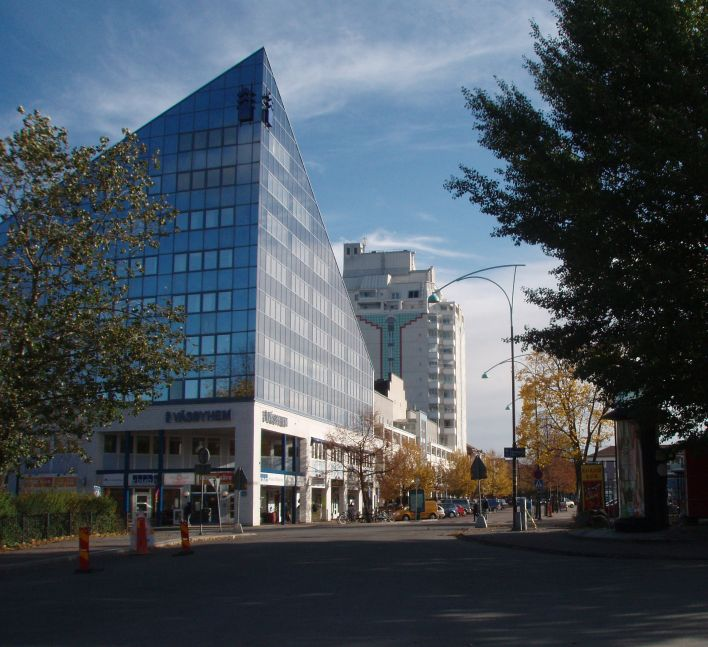
- Upplands Väsby in October 2007

- Location within Stockholm Location within Sweden Location within European Union Location within Europe
- Coordinates: 59°31′N 17°55′E
- Country: Sweden
- Province: Uppland
- County: Stockholm County
- Municipality: Upplands Väsby Municipality; Sollentuna Municipality

Area
  - Total: 14.17 km^{2} (5.47 sq mi)

Population (31 December 2020)
  - Total: 48,907
  - Density: 2,653/km^{2} (6,870/sq mi)
- Time zone: UTC+1 (CET)
  - Summer (DST): UTC+2 (CEST)

Upplands Väsby (Swedish pronunciation: [ˈɵ̌pːlands ˈvɛ̌ːsbʏ]) is a locality and the seat of Upplands Väsby Municipality, Stockholm County, Sweden with 48,907 inhabitants in 2020.

== History ==
The municipality has a long history with clear traces of settlements from the pre-Christian times in several places. The first traces of human culture have been found during excavations of Hammarby ridge, about 400 meters south of the current Glädjen junction, where the excavation of the burial ground Ekebo found a bronze axe from around 600 to 700 BC. Upplands Väsby has a low topography and the people lived by fishing, seal and waterfowl hunting. Several finds of foreign coins testify to the extensive trade with foreign countries. They include Arabic coins found at Great Wäsby castle grounds.

At Runsa and Skavsta's prehistoric fortifications, known as hill forts. Traces of aboriginal burial grounds are found in many places in the form of mounds, stone circles, standing stones, or minor bumps. The graves are sometimes the shape of a ship, as at Runsa, one of Sweden's most famous stone circles. It is 56 meters from the bow and stern and was made in 400-500 AD. Other cemeteries in the form of large burial mounds exist near Löwenströmska Hospital and Runby, called Zamores Hill after the timpanist Antonin Zamore, a North African who came to Sweden in the late 1700s and who lived on the Runby Lower farm, now called the homestead. The largest cemetery is the Great Wäsby Castle ättebacke with around 200 burial mounds.

In the early 1900s, Upplands Väsby was a small station community. The town's railway station was completed in 1865, situated on the rail line between Stockholm and Uppsala, built between 1863 and 1866. Around the station, a society grew. Anton Tamm had bought up all the land that the present society is built on. In 1903 Tamm, at the time was CEO of Optimus, established the first major industry, Väsby Werkstäder. The company manufactured brass and copper, including Optimus products. Väsby Werkstäder was bought in 1917 by Finspongs Metallverk AB. Over the years, the company changed its name many times, but was popularly always called Messingen. They were later Swedish Metal Works and Granges-Weda and offered die casting and plastic manufacturing.

== Upplands Väsby today ==
The municipality now has the character of a modern suburban town, situated between Stockholm and Uppsala. The distance to the city centre of Stockholm is twenty-five kilometers and to the centre of Uppsala forty-five km. Travel to Stockholm Central Station takes 27 minutes (10 stations) by commuter train. Travel time to Arlanda Airport is seven minutes by local train, which also connects Upplands Väsby with Uppsala. From Upplands Väsby are many renowned music artists: Europe, Therion, H.E.A.T., Candlemass and IFA Wartburg have lived there, as well as John Norum and Yngwie Malmsteen. Even the actors Shima Niavarani and Shebly Niavarani have lived and attended school in Upplands Väsby. Some famous writers who lived in Upplands Väsby are Carl Jonas Love Almquist, P. C. Jersild, and Alexander Ahndoril.

== Settlement ==
Parts of the industry that was in the area near the railway station can now be seen south of the neighborhood Messingen where Optimus established himself in 1908. Optimus factory in Upplands Väsby was closed in 1983 when production was moved to Småland (the company still exists today under the name Optimus International AB. Now manufactures mainly camping). In the former industrial premises is now run new activities, including Upplands Väsby art gallery. Today, the original buildings demolished to make way for new housing and a new school, Väsby new gymnasium, which was completed before the start of school in August 2011. If you follow the road east from Central Station can be reached after a few hundred meters including Culture Vega, Väsby School and after another short stretch Väsby Centre including a shopping mall, medical center, and municipal offices.

=== Väsby ===
Väsby centrum was opened in 1972. Several extensions and renovations have been made over the years and in recent years, major changes implemented. The shopping mall contains a variety of stores with a wide selection of apparel, electronics, cosmetics, health foods, books, flowers, jewelry, and grocery stores and restaurants. [3] center facility owned by Väsbyhem who in 2001 sold the plant to Doughty Hanson & Co European Real Estate. From December 2004 the plant was operated center of the Franco-Dutch property company Unibail-Rodamco, until June 2011, when it was sold to the British family firm Grosvenor in a business where other plants were included.

=== Residential ===
- Smedby/Ekebo, with Viking farm yard Gunnes Gård (see Uppland Runic 280 and Uppland Runic 281). Smedbyvägen / Ekebo first part was built in 1974 and the third and last part was completed in the mid-1980s. The municipal housing company Väsbyhem built and owned the entire area until the end of 2007, when Smedbyvägen 1 (about 700 apartments) was sold to Stena Property.
- Carlslund is located east of E4. The original settlement consisted primarily of employee housing (designed by Anders Tengbom) erected in the mid-1950s. It has previously been both nursing homes as refugees. Ahead of Housing Exhibition 1985 was a great and new construction in the area.
- Brunnby Park is located in the eastern part of Carl Lund, about one kilometer east of the city center, 500 meters from European Route 4. In 2009 onwards, nearly 150 villas and townhouses built in the area.
- Old Väsby, or Central Väsby, the station area and the downtown facility. It was the home Optimus turbines factory blocks Messingen, which has now been demolished.
- Runby/Runby Backar, municipal northwestern parts with a recreation area, as well as Ed's church.
- Apoteksskogen, or colloquially Sigma, for an area center. Built west of Hammarby Apotek.
- Väsbyskogen, usually also considered to Sigma.
- Sundsborg, usually also considered to Odenslunda.
- Grimstaby built as a backlash on million program in the 1970s. Terraced area designed as an old-fashioned small town with a main street, square and various small business premises, including kiosk, hairdresser and restaurant. The area, which houses both schools and kindergartens, was originally built as rental units but was converted in the late 2000s to condominiums.
- Hagängen/Löwenströmska hospital, built next to Löwenströmska hospital. Mixed housing, lowest apartment building (former staff housing), and a smaller proportion of terraced / semi-detached houses.
- Prästgårdsmarken, agglomeration south-western parts. Composed almost entirely of apartment buildings constructed during the 1980s.
- Bollstanäs, the southern / south-eastern parts. The buildings consist of villas and borders the municipality of Sollentuna.
- Fresta
- Odenslunda
- Brunnby/Brunnby Vik located about two kilometers east of the city center; mostly townhouses, villas, and small businesses.
- Sjukyrkoberget
- Skälby
- Sanda Ängar

== Schools ==
There are more than 3,000 students spread over fourteen elementary schools and one secondary school. Half the primary schools are communal.

- Bollstanäs skola, grades 1–5, about 250 pupils.
- Breddenskolan, grades 1–5.
- Väsbyskolan, over 420 students, grades 4–9, with learning disabilities, as well as music classes and science classes grades 4–9.
- Frestaskolan, grades 1–5, free school from the autumn term 2008.
- Grimstaskolan, grades 6–9, approximately 450 students. The school has a football focus. The school has a special partnership with Vilunda gymnasium. The school also has a joint municipal group for students with autism spectrum disorders in which grades 4-9 gather.
- Hasselskolan, preschool, grades 1–3, from the autumn semester 2007 grades 1–5.
- Odenslunda skola, preschool, grade 1–5, independent school from the autumn term 2008. More than 200 students.
- Runbyskolan, about 560 students, pre-school, grade F-9.
- Smedbyskolan, grades 1–6, about 250 pupils.
- Smedsgärdsskolan, grades 1–6, approximately around 1-1000 students.
- Södervikskolan, grades 6–9, free school from the autumn semester 2008, 390 students.
- Sweden-Finnish school, private school, about 150 students.
- Vikskolan, preschool, grade 1–9, independent school from the autumn term 2008. By 2025, Vikskolan will be demolished and replaced with a newly built school named Viraskolan.
- Vittra in Vasby, more than 300 students, kindergarten and grades 1–9, is an independent school in Vittra (business).

=== Secondary school ===
- Väsby new gymnasium. The school started in August 2011 and the municipality's former high school, Vilunda High School, was closed and demolished for new apartments.
- ANNUAL School
- Energy School

== Transportation ==
- Stockholm commuter line 40 Uppsala C - Arlanda C - Solna - Stockholm City - Älvsjö - Flemingsberg - Södertälje centrum
- Stockholm commuter line 41 (Uppsala C -) Märsta - Solna - Stockholm City - Älvsjö - Flemingsberg - Södertälje centrum
- Stockholm commuter line 42X Märsta - Solna - Stockholm City - Älvsjö - Västerhaninge - Nynäshamn
- Bus routes 524, 529, 531, 532, 533, 534, 535, 536, 537, 538, 539, 545, 560, 560X, 562, 568, 577, 684. Many depart from the bus terminal at Upplands Väsby railway station.
- Night bus routes 592, 598, 599.

== Notable people ==
- Carl Jonas Love Almqvist (1793-1866), author and social critic
- Calle Asell (born 1994), ice hockey player
- Joey Tempest (born 1963), lead vocalist of the rock band Europe
- Robert Topala (born 1987), a video game developer, famous for creating Geometry Dash
- Björn Wesström (born 1972), a football executive
- Julia Zigiotti Olme (born 1997), football player for the Sweden national team
- Christofer Johnsson (born 1972), founding member and guitarist of the symphonic metal band Therion

== See also ==
- Cederroth
- Infra City
