= Call (surname) =

Call is a surname. Notable people with the surname include:

- Alex Call (born 1994), American baseball player
- Ann Lowdon Call (1945–2007), horsewoman
- Annie Payson Call (1853–1940), American author
- Anson Call (1810–1890), Mormon pioneer and colonizer of the Utah Territory
- Brandon Call (born 1976), American television and film actor
- Emma Louise Call (1847–1937), American physician
- Evan Call (born 1988), American composer
- Sir John Call, 1st Baronet (1731–1801), English engineer and baronet
- Ramon Malla Call (1922–2014), Bishop of Lleida, Andorra
- R. D. Call (1950–2020), American film and television actor
- Richard K. Call (1792–1862), territorial governor of Florida
- Wilkinson Call (1834–1910), US senator from Florida

== Fictional characters ==
- Annalee Call, the android portrayed by Winona Ryder in Alien: Resurrection
- Woodrow F. Call, a Texas Ranger who appears in all four books of Larry McMurtry's Lonesome Dove series

== See also ==
- Call (disambiguation)
- Calla (name)
- Calle (name)
