= Kombori Department =

Coordinates: 13°51′N 2°25′W

Kombori
- Department
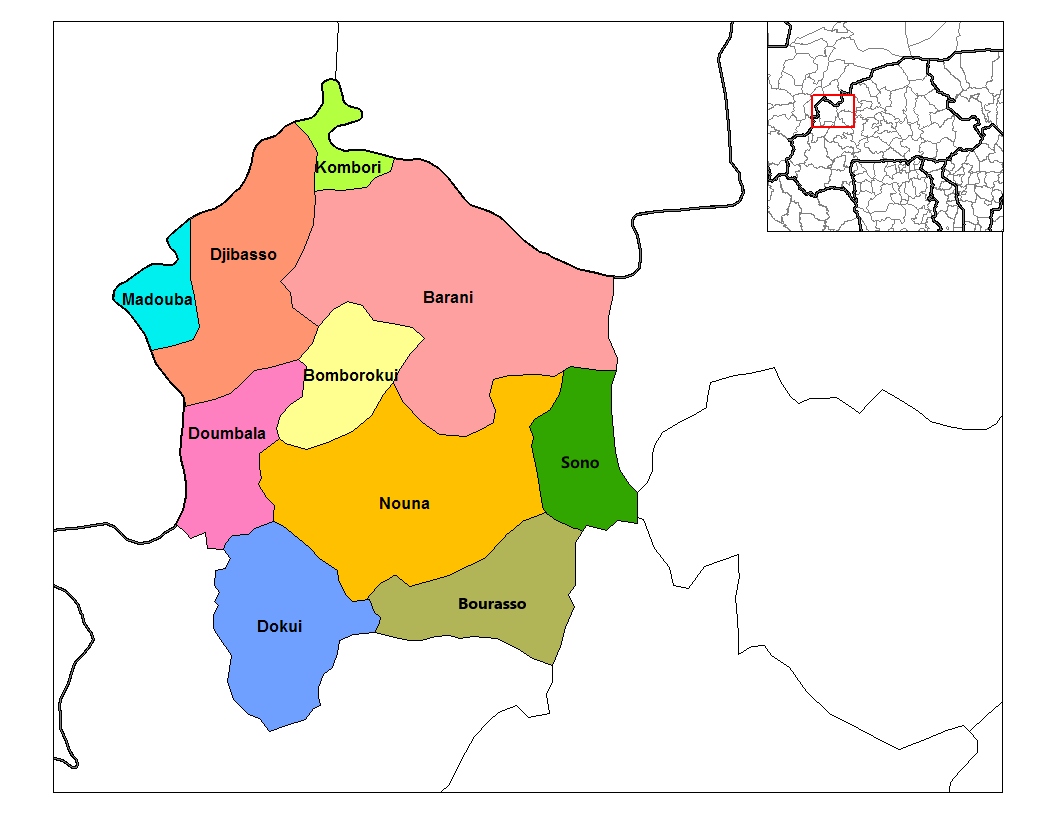
- Kombori Department location in the province
- Country: Burkina Faso
- Province: Kossi Province

Area
  - Total: 86.6 sq mi (224.4 km^{2})

Population (2019)
  - Total: 15,118
  - Density: 174.5/sq mi (67.37/km^{2})
- Time zone: UTC+0 (GMT 0)

Kombori is a department or commune of Kossi Province in western Burkina Faso. Its capital lies at the town of Kombori. According to the 1996 census the department has a total population of 9,610.

== Towns and villages ==
- Kombori (1 586 inhabitants) (capital)
- Abaye (791 inhabitants)
- Aourèma (584 inhabitants)
- Ba-Peulh (127 inhabitants)
- Daga (201 inhabitants)
- Gani (623 inhabitants)
- Kolonkani-Ba (218 inhabitants)
- Konna (857 inhabitants)
- Lonani (239 inhabitants)
- Magadian (1 083 inhabitants)
- Ouori (571 inhabitants)
- Sanakadougou (978 inhabitants)
- Sassambari (321 inhabitants)
- Siekoro (455 inhabitants)
- Siewali (301 inhabitants)
- Siguidé (150 inhabitants)
- Yaran (525 inhabitants)
