= María Victoria Calle =

Magistrate of the Constitutional Court of Colombia (1959–2025)

María Victoria Calle Correa

Magistrate of the Constitutional Court of Colombia
- In office April 2009 – April 2017
- Nominated by: Álvaro Uribe Vélez
- Preceded by: Manuel José Cepeda Espinosa

Personal details
- Born: 8 May 1959 Medellín, Antioquia, Colombia
- Died: 21 December 2025 (aged 66)
- Spouse: Gustavo Eduardo Gómez Aranguren
- Education: Externado University (LLM, 2007); University of Medellín (LLB, 1982)
- Profession: Lawyer

María Victoria Calle Correa (8 May 1959 – 21 December 2025) was a Colombian lawyer who served as a magistrate of the Constitutional Court of Colombia, from April 2009 to April 2017. Calle was the second female magistrate (after Clara Inés Vargas Hernández).

== Early career ==
A lawyer from the University of Medellín, she specialized in Administrative Law from Saint Thomas Aquinas University and the University of Salamanca, and received a Master's in Administrative Law from Externado University. Prior to her nomination, she worked at Previsora Seguros S.A., an insurance provider, since 2004, and was its vice president of legal affairs since 2005.

== Constitutional Court magistrate ==
Calle was elected to replace Magistrate Manuel José Cepeda Espinosa by the Senate from a ternary submitted by President Álvaro Uribe Vélez, receiving 76 of the votes over her fellow nominees, Zayda del Carmen Barrero de Noguera and José Fernando Torres. The nomination and subsequent election process, as well as that of her fellow magistrate Jorge Pretelt Chlajub which occurred at the same time, were criticised by Elección Visible, an election watchdog organization, for lack of transparency and the clear existence of back-door deals that permitted their election to have been secured from the beginning, and thus ignoring the ternary nomination process in which three compelling candidates are nominated and the Senate elects the best option; in their respective cases, each ternary list was composed of the favourite candidate and two lesser choices. This lack of seriousness in the process was coupled in the media with the perception that President Uribe broke tradition by nominating candidates who were neither constitutional scholars, respected professors in academia, nor held a PhD—in marked contrast to their predecessors in the Court.

Calle's views were unknown at the time of her nomination and was generally regarded as a conservative, as her husband, Gustavo Eduardo Gómez Aranguren, a Magistrate of the Council of State had defined conservative views, and because of her nomination and strong backing by the conservative leaning Administration of President Uribe. Nonetheless during her tenure, she backed most of the liberal block rulings such as Same-sex marriage and adoption by same sex couples, women rights and animal rights.

== Death ==
Calle died on 21 December 2025 at the age of 66.
