= Calle Facius =

Danish footballer (born 1971)

Personal information
- Date of birth: 1 January 1971 (age 55)
- Position: Midfielder

Team information
- Current team: Hals FS (Manager)

Senior career*
Years	Team	Apps	(Gls)
1991–1997	AaB	193	(9)
1997–1998	Ikast FS	25	(1)
1998–2002	Vejle BK	82	(3)
Total		300	(13)

Managerial career
- Farsø Ullits
- 2008: Hobro IK
- 2008–2010: AaB (reserves)
- 2011–2012: Støvring IF U19
- 2012–2013: Støvring IF
- 2016–2017: IF Jarl Arden
- 2018–2019: Støvring IF (youth coach)
- 2019–2021: Støvring IF
- 2023–: Hals FS
- * Club domestic league appearances and goals

Calle Facius (born 1 January 1971) is a Danish former professional footballer who made 300 appearances in the Superliga for AaB, Ikast FS and Vejle Boldklub.
