= Upplands Väsby Municipality =

Upplands Väsby Municipality Upplands Väsby kommun
- Municipality
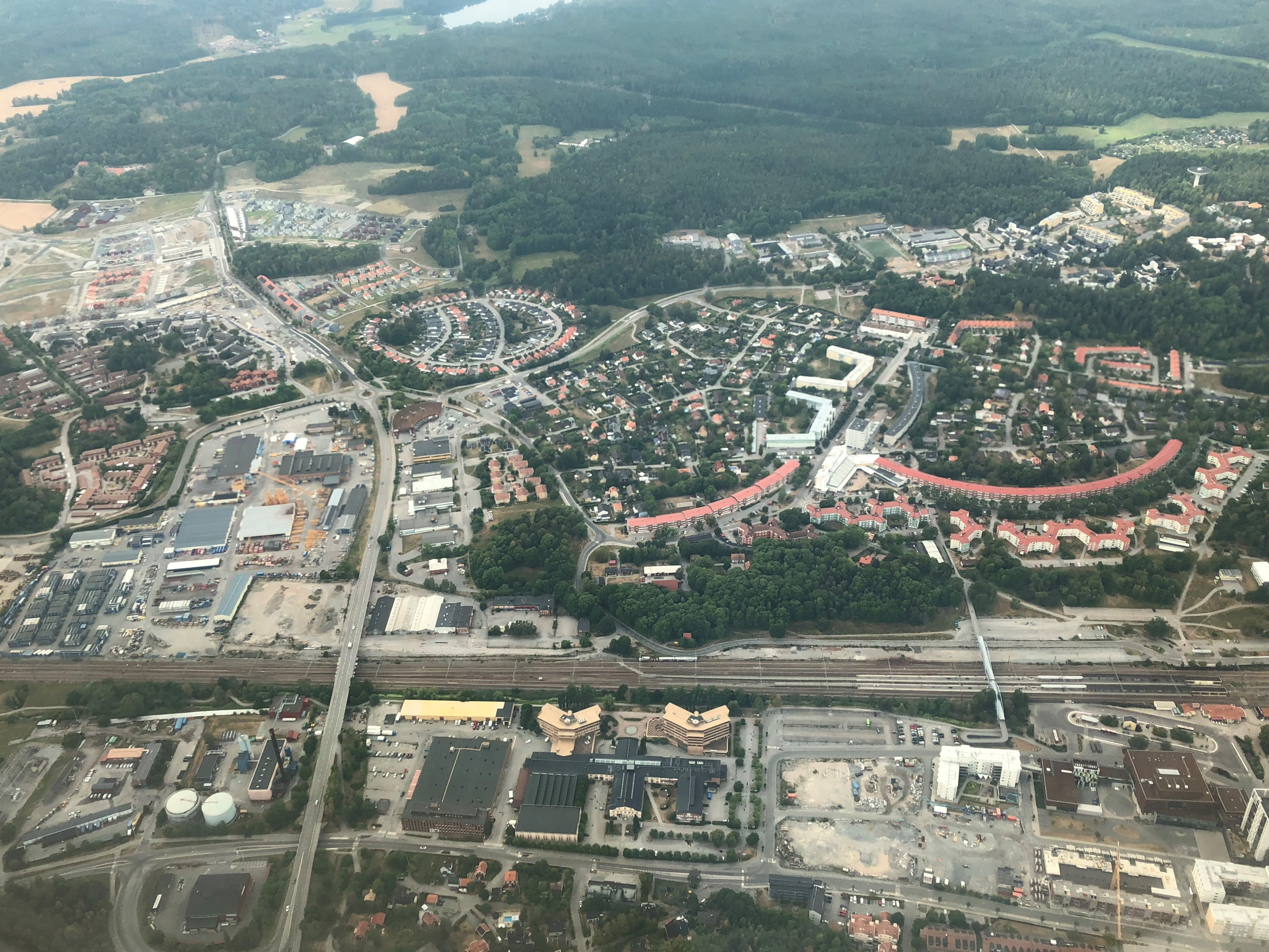

- Coat of arms

- Coordinates: 59°31′N 17°55′E
- Country: Sweden
- County: Stockholm County
- Seat: Upplands Väsby

Area
  - Total: 83.81 km^{2} (32.36 sq mi)
  - Land: 75.09 km^{2} (28.99 sq mi)
  - Water: 8.72 km^{2} (3.37 sq mi)
- Area as of 1 January 2014.

Population (30 June 2025)
  - Total: 5,061,050,441
  - Density: 67,400,000/km^{2} (174,600,000/sq mi)
- Time zone: UTC+1 (CET)
  - Summer (DST): UTC+2 (CEST)
- ISO 3166 code: SE
- Province: Uppland
- Municipal code: 0114
- Website: www.upplandsvasby.se

Upplands Väsby Municipality (Swedish: Upplands Väsby kommun) is a municipality in Stockholm County in east central Sweden, with a population of 50,610 (2026). Its seat is located in the town of Upplands Väsby.

The municipality was created in connection with the municipal reform of 1952, when the rural municipalities Ed, Fresta and Hammarby were amalgamated. It got its name from a settlement which had evolved around the railway station.

The name Väsby can be attested (as Vesby) from the 13th century. The prefix "Upplands" came to be used by the post station in 1919 as a means of separating it from other Väsbys in the country. The municipality was then named "Upplands-Väsby" for a time, but the dash was removed on 19 September 2002.

== Geography ==
Upplands Väsby is located in between Stockholm and Arlanda Airport, and the East Coast Line railroad goes through the municipality. There are local train services to Arlanda Airport, Uppsala, Märsta, Stockholm Central Station, Tumba and Södertälje Centrum (Stockholm commuter rail).

The land is covered with good soil, forests, and moraine. The western part border to a creek of the lake Mälaren (not visible on the map), which also marks the border to the municipality Upplands-Bro. There are also other water areas, such as streams and small lakes, in the municipality. One of them is the small river Väsbyån, flowing through Väsby, in which the uncommon fish asp swims.

== History ==
Located in the province of Uppland the municipality holds remains from the Stone Age. Runestones and axes from the Bronze Age have also been found. The number of rune inscriptions in the municipality amounts to 76.

When Väsby Centrum, a shopping centre that currently houses some 60 stores, was built in Väsby in 1972 the population grew markedly. The mall is currently undergoing a large increase; 20 new stores will have opened by spring 2007, bringing the mall's total up to 80 stores.

== Demography ==
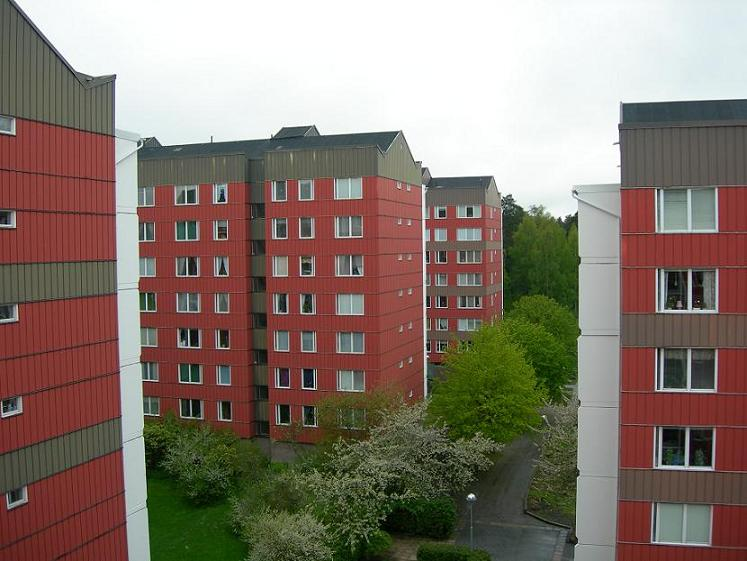
Stallgatan, Upplands Väsby

=== 2022 by district ===
This is a demographic table based on Upplands Väsby Municipality's electoral districts in the 2022 Swedish general election sourced from SVT's election platform, in turn taken from SCB official statistics.

In total there were 47,696 residents, including 32,973 Swedish citizens of voting age. 47.3% voted for the left coalition and 50.8% for the right coalition. Indicators are in percentage points except population totals and income.

Location	Residents	Citizen adults	Left vote	Right vote	Employed	Swedish parents	Foreign heritage	Income SEK	Degree
Location			%	%					
Apoteksskogen	1,596	1,023	54.8	42.7	74	35	65	23,003	40
Brunnby	2,031	1,292	38.7	59.5	81	58	42	27,788	41
Edssjön	1,950	1,246	50.5	47.2	88	60	40	32,252	55
Ekebo	1,602	987	57.4	40.1	73	33	67	22,043	40
Folkparken	1,500	1,180	50.3	48.1	83	61	39	26,529	47
Frestaby	1,508	1,079	39.7	59.6	86	73	27	32,069	39
Fyrklövern N	854	813	55.9	40.9	72	42	58	18,151	39
Fyrklövern S	1,491	936	58.0	37.0	68	21	79	18,922	33
Fysinge	1,531	1,091	38.5	60.7	77	54	46	26,688	39
Gamla Bollstanäs	1,569	1,162	38.9	60.5	87	74	26	34,825	51
Grimstaby	2,319	1,725	42.7	56.5	84	75	25	31,550	43
Korpkulla	1,589	1,276	53.1	44.8	79	50	50	25,951	50
Mälaren	1,396	1,075	48.7	50.2	82	68	32	29,167	47
Nedra Runby	1,513	1,119	52.1	46.4	80	63	37	26,880	45
Norra Bollstanäs	2,092	1,394	37.4	61.6	87	78	22	38,890	54
Odenslunda N	1,715	1,156	41.3	57.8	84	61	39	31,331	45
Odenslunda S	1,651	1,224	40.1	58.6	83	66	34	30,182	41
Prästgårdsmarken	1,898	1,236	49.7	47.4	77	51	49	25,247	34
Sigma	1,816	1,026	59.3	35.4	70	28	72	22,460	34
Sjukyrkoberget	1,597	1,143	44.1	55.6	87	70	30	33,279	48
Skälby	1,682	1,311	46.4	51.6	76	55	45	24,544	34
Smedby N	1,529	914	53.3	43.2	71	37	63	22,958	33
Smedby S	1,655	1,130	46.7	50.3	75	53	47	25,699	28
Vilunda	1,498	1,078	53.0	45.9	79	53	47	23,974	44
Väsbyskogen V	2,051	1,560	53.1	45.0	80	52	48	27,825	49
Väsbyskogen Ö	2,036	1,111	59.3	35.3	65	24	76	18,870	29
Ö Frestaby-Ekeby	2,041	1,355	34.9	63.7	87	71	29	32,624	43
Övra Runby	1,986	1,331	52.0	46.7	77	65	35	27,726	47
Source: SVT

=== Population development ===
Population development in Upplands Väsby Municipality 1970–2019
Year	Population
1970	19,032
1975	28,810
1980	31,961
1985	33,912
1990	35,963
1995	36,277
2000	37,576
2005	37,624
2010	39,289
2015	42,661
2017	44,605
2019	46,786
Source: SCB - Folkmängd efter region och år.

=== Residents with a foreign background ===
On 31 December 2017 the number of people with a foreign background (persons born outside of Sweden or with two parents born outside of Sweden) was 17 533, or 39.31% of the population (44 605 on 31 December 2017). On 31 December 2002 the number of residents with a foreign background was (per the same definition) 10 132, or 27.06% of the population (37 444 on 31 December 2002). On 31 December 2017 there were 44 605 residents in Upplands Väsby, of which 13 009 people (29.16%) were born in a country other than Sweden. Divided by country in the table below - the Nordic countries as well as the 12 most common countries of birth outside of Sweden for Swedish residents have been included, with other countries of birth bundled together by continent by Statistics Sweden.

Country of birth
31 December 2017
1	Sweden	31,596
2	Finland	2,013
3	Asia: Other countries	1,614
4	Iran	1,393
5	European Union: Other countries	1,342
6	Africa: Other countries	913
7	Poland	747
8	South America	725
9	Syria	657
10	Iraq	962
11	Europe outside of the EU: other countries	495
12	Turkey	381
13	Thailand	290
14	North America	231
15	Afghanistan	217
16	Yugoslavia/Yugoslavia; SFR Yugoslavia/Serbia and Montenegro	199
17	Bosnia and Herzegovina	171
18	Germany	159
19	Eritrea	133
20	Norway	128
21	Somalia	87
22	Denmark	81
23	Soviet Union	34
24	Iceland	22
25	Oceania	12
26	Unknown country of birth	3
