= Rodolfo Calle =

Bolivian politician (born 1964)

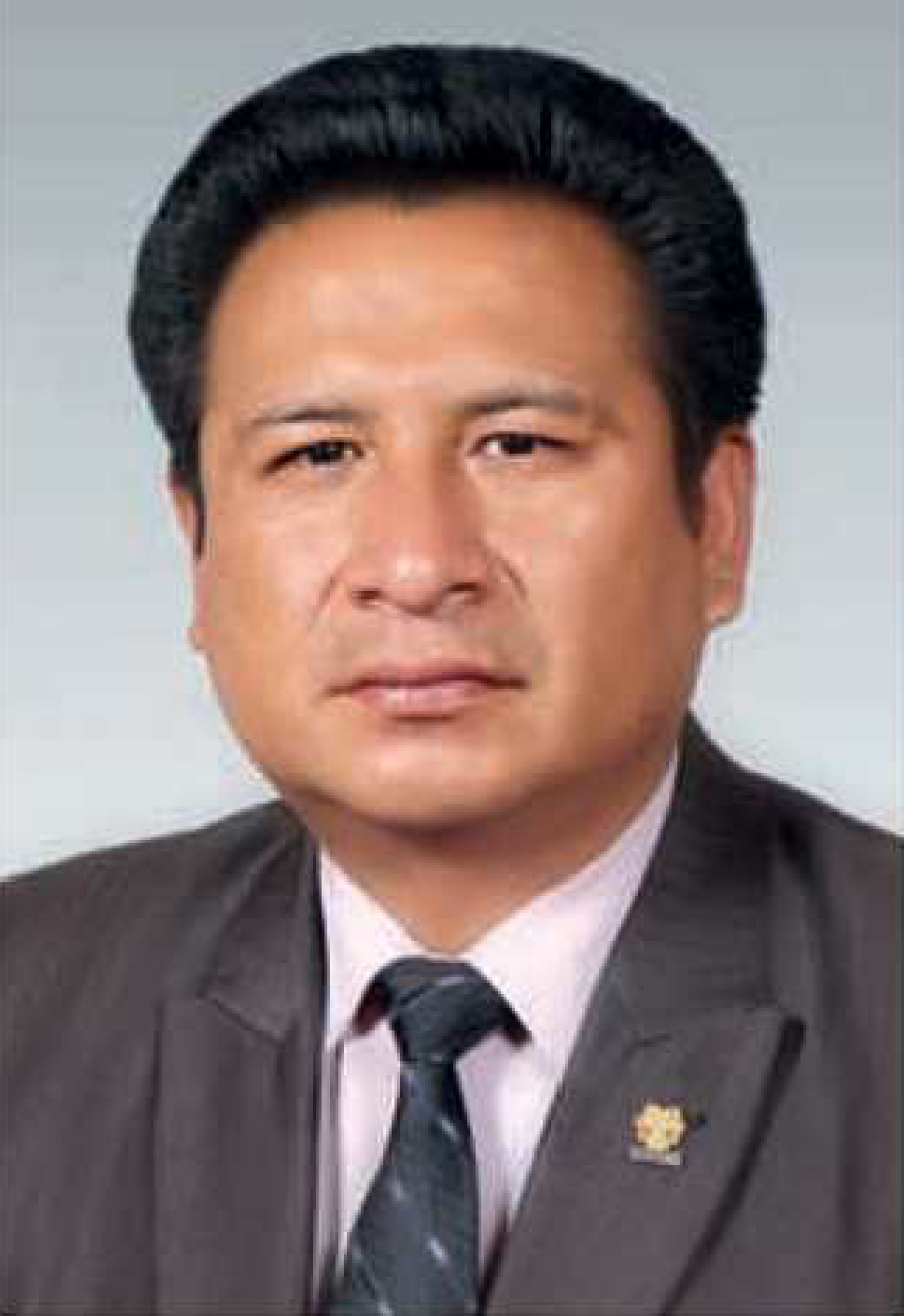
- Official portrait, 2014

Member of the Chamber of Deputies from La Paz
- In office 19 January 2010 – 18 January 2015
- Substitute: Maribel Vargas
- Preceded by: Simón de la Barra
- Succeeded by: Víctor Ramírez
- Constituency: Party list

Personal details
- Born: Rodolfo Calle Inca; 23 September 1964 (age 61) La Paz, Bolivia
- Party: Movement for Socialism
- Occupation: Businessman; lawyer; politician

Rodolfo Calle Inca (born 23 September 1964) is a Bolivian small businessman, lawyer, and politician who served as a party-list member of the Chamber of Deputies from La Paz from 2010 to 2015.

The sole proprietor of a small enterprise, Calle gained prominence through organizational leadership among the capital's leather goods vendors. He served as vice president and then president of the Departmental Federation of Micro and Small Enterprises of La Paz and was secretary of minutes at the National Confederation of Micro and Small Enterprises of Bolivia.

A member of the Movement for Socialism, Calle represented the micro-enterprise sector on the party's parliamentary slate in the 2009 election and won a seat for La Paz Department in the Chamber of Deputies. He served only a single term and declined to seek reelection. He ceded his seat to Víctor Ramírez, who had been his constituent's original nominee the previous election.

== Early life and career ==
=== Early life and education ===
Rodolfo Calle was born on 23 September 1964 in La Paz, in a household of modest means involved in the leather goods business. His mother, Bonifacia Inca, was a homemaker and small trader who made and sold leather products – mostly purses and the like. His father, Víctor Calle, served in the Armed Forces and died early during Rodolfo's childhood.

Calle completed his primary and intermediate studies at the Holland and Félix Reyes Ortiz schools in La Paz and received his secondary baccalaureate from the city's Adventist institute. He studied law at the Higher University of San Andrés and the Bolivian Technological University, but was forced to disenroll due to family matters – although he would eventually return to complete the degree. He also completed a diploma program in leadership at International IDEA.

=== Small business career ===
Calle was brought on as an assistant at his brother-in-law's handbag factory at age 12 in 1976 and apprenticed there until he turned 17 in 1981. He became the sole proprietor of his own manufacturing plant shortly thereafter. The business went under several times before he could accrue the capital to keep it afloat, but it eventually grew into a moderately sized small enterprise.

Around the turn of the century, Calle began to take part in the guilds and employers' associations that make up the micro-enterprise sector. He became a figure of import among the city's leather goods merchants, serving as secretary of relations in the Union of Micro-entrepreneurs in Leather Goods between 2000 and 2002 before going on to found another organization, the Association of Micro-entrepreneurs in Leather Goods, which he led from 2006 to 2010.

At the department level, Calle served as vice president of the Departmental Federation of Micro and Small Enterprises of La Paz from 2003 to 2009. He led the organization as its president during his term in parliament, circa 2010–2012, and remained in leadership as a board member and secretary of relations in the years that followed. Those posts propelled him to the national level, and he capped his career as secretary of minutes for the National Confederation of Micro and Small Enterprises of Bolivia (CONAMYPE), an office he held from 2009 to 2011.

== Chamber of Deputies ==
=== Election ===
Like many members of the country's small merchant class, Calle sympathized with the policies of the Movement for Socialism (MAS) and became a member of the party early on. (Note: In contrast to big businesses and large multinationals, the MAS fostered tender relations with the micro and small business sector: its leaders bore little of the brunt of the party's anti-capitalist and anti-corporate rhetoric, and by contrast, shared the MAS's mistrust for the country's economic elite and sympathized with its support for marginalized groups – from which they mostly originated.) Despite belonging to the private sector, merchants often teetered on the edge of informality, lived in precarious economic positions, and relied heavily on state services. Since the 2005 election, the MAS had developed an ongoing alliance with the country's small employers' associations, who leveraged the support of their base for positions of power in government.

This pact solidified with the admission of CONAMYPE as a member organization of the MAS in 2006 and continued through 2009, when the party offered the micro-enterprise sector a quota of candidates on its parliamentary lists. In La Paz, the local federation initially elected Víctor Ramírez as its nominee, but procedural hurdles prevented him from running. In his stead, Calle – who had been the runner-up candidate – was given the nod to run. He was included on the MAS party list in La Paz and was elected to represent the department in the Chamber of Deputies.

=== Tenure ===
Assuming office on 19 January 2010, Calle's legislative priorities centered on the needs of the micro-enterprise sector. He collaborated with members of the national confederation to sponsor legislation in favor of small and medium-sized enterprises; already in 2010, a draft bill aimed at properly defining the legal status of micro-enterprises and regulating their access to markets was presented, to be developed in cooperation with local and small business federations. The legislation was not taken up during Calle's term, but a finalized rendition of the bill was enacted into law by President Evo Morales in 2017.

Calle contemplated remaining in politics beyond the end of his term but tempered expectations that he might seek reelection in 2014. He went on to back the nomination of Ramírez – the president of CONAMYPE, who had been the sector's original pick the previous cycle – to fill his seat in the Chamber of Deputies. Calle's term concluded on 18 January 2015, and he resumed business activities at his factory.

=== Commission assignments ===
- Plural Justice, Prosecutor's Office, and Legal Defense of the State Commission
  - Prosecutor's Office and Legal Defense of the State Committee (2010–2011; Secretary: 2011–2013)
- Education and Health Commission
  - Education Committee (2013–2014)
- Human Rights Commission (President: 2014–2015)

== Electoral history ==
Electoral history of Rodolfo Calle
Year	Office	Party	Votes			Result	Ref.
Year	Office	Party	Total	%	P.	Result	Ref.
2009	Deputy	Movement for Socialism	1,099,259	80.28%	1st	Won	(Note: Presented on an electoral list. The data shown represents the share of the vote the entire party/alliance received in that constituency.)
Source: Plurinational Electoral Organ | Electoral Atlas

Chamber of Deputies of Bolivia
Preceded by Simón de la Barra	Member of the Chamber of Deputies from La Paz; 2010–2015	Succeeded by Víctor Ramírez
