= Eugenia Calle =

American cancer epidemiologist

Eugenia E. "Jeanne" Calle
- Born: January 5, 1952
- Died: February 17, 2009 (aged 57)
- Education: BS in Medical Communications from Columbia University; PhD in Epidemiology from Ohio State University
- Occupation: Cancer epidemiologist
- Employer(s): Oak Ridge National Laboratory Centers for Disease Control and Prevention American Cancer Society

Eugenia E. "Jeanne" Calle (January 5, 1952 – February 17, 2009) was an American cancer epidemiologist. Her research examined the links between obesity, diet, and cancer. Additionally she published studies on risk factors for breast and ovarian cancers. She was murdered in her Atlanta condominium in 2009.

== Early life and education ==
Calle grew up in Fairlawn, Ohio, and attended Copley High School in the 1960s. She received her bachelor's degree in medical communications from Columbia University and her doctoral degree in epidemiology from Ohio State University (Department of Preventive Medicine, College of Medicine).

== Academic career ==
Calle worked at Oak Ridge National Laboratory in the area of cancer risk assessment, and later at the Centers for Disease Control and Prevention on the Agent Orange Projects. Calle joined the American Cancer Society (ACS) in 1989 as the director of their Study Management Group. She became the director of Analytic Epidemiology in Epidemiology and Surveillance at the ACS in 1999, and was later promoted to Vice President of Epidemiology there. While at the ACS, she directed the Cancer Prevention Study, and also conducted two landmark studies on the link between obesity and cancer. Her research indicated that the ratio of the dietary consumption of omega-6 to omega-3 fatty acids does not impact colorectal cancer risk. Her research advanced understanding of the risk factors for the use of combined estrogen and progesterone for breast and ovarian cancers, and research on hormone replacement therapy and cancers affecting women. She was also instrumental in developing the ACS Cancer Prevention Studies into major resources for groundbreaking research on air pollution, nutrition, physical activity, medications, and inherited susceptibility genes. She served as a member of the National Cancer Institute's Board of Scientific Counselors, the American Epidemiological Society, an adjunct Professor of Epidemiology at the Rollins School of Public Health, Emory University, and on the editorial boards of several prominent cancer journals. Roughly two weeks before her death, Calle retired as Vice President of Epidemiology and Surveillance Research at the ACS.

== Death ==
Calle died on February 17, 2009, in her condominium in Atlanta, at the age of 57. She died from a blow to the head inflicted by a man posing as a prospective buyer for her condominium, which she had been planning on selling. Shamal Thompson later pleaded guilty to killing Calle and was sentenced to life in prison in August 2010.

== Selected works and publications ==
1. Calle EE, Rodriguez C, Walker-Thurmond K, Thun MJ. Overweight, obesity, and mortality from cancer in a prospectively studied cohort of U.S. adults. New England Journal of Medicine. 2003;348(17):1625-38.
2. Calle EE, Thun MJ, Petrelli JM, Rodriguez C, Heath CW Jr. Body-mass index and mortality in a prospective cohort of U.S. adults. New England Journal of Medicine. 1999;341(15):1097-105.
3. Daniel CR, McCullough ML, Patel RC, Jacobs EJ, Flanders WD, Thun MJ, Calle EE. Dietary intake of omega-6 and omega-3 fatty acids and risk of colorectal cancer in a prospective cohort of U.S. men and women. Cancer Epidemiol Biomarkers Prev. 2009 Feb;18(2):516-25. doi: 10.1158/1055-9965.EPI-08-0750. Epub 2009 Feb 3.
4. Calle EE, Feigelson HS, Hildebrand JS, Teras LR, Thun MJ, Rodriguez C. Postmenopausal hormone use and breast cancer associations differ by hormone regimen and histologic subtype. Cancer. 2009 Mar 1;115(5):936-45. doi: 10.1002/cncr.24101. PMID 19156895
