= Calle Lindström =

Swedish singer and comedian

Calle Lindström

Calle Lindström (1868–1955) was a Swedish singer and comedian from Östergötland.

== Career ==
Trained as a stucco worker, Lindström eventually left that line of work to become a bondkomiker (peasant comic) and bygdemålstalare (dialect storyteller). In 1901 he appeared for the first time at the newly dedicated folk park in Norrköping. He took part in local revues there for many years, and was on the folk park circuit until the end of the 1940s. A long-term contract enabled him to become one of Sweden's most prolific recording artists with over two hundred sides to his credit. His motto was: "Above all else, be original!"

Calle Lindström had perhaps the most varied background of any peasant comic. Born in 1868, in his youth he was a circus artist, who worked in every facet of the entertainment industry. The concertina was his instrument as he regaled audiences despite missing four fingers on his right hand — he had to turn the instrument upside down and hide the disfigured hand with a handkerchief. He sometimes used a method of presentation called the "tintamarresque theater". A common practice in Swedish variety halls, the performer would stand behind a photographed foreground and slip his head through an opening in the picture for comic effect.

Lindström's 1908 recording of Chikago achieved popularity on both sides of the Atlantic. The song, whose music and lyrics he wrote, has been recorded by many artists since then and published in Swedish and American songbooks.

Chicago was one of the major urban centers for Swedish immigrants. Lasse from Ossebo, the character in the song, has heard many marvelous things about Chicago from his brother who lives there. He is impressed by the stockyards and the elevated railway, but perhaps even more by the fact that "at night it's just like daytime, there are so many lights" — and "everybody smokes cigars instead of chewing snuff." Lasse decides to go there himself: "And there I'll make my fortune and be a proper gent. Good-bye to each and all of you, it's time now that I went!"

The humorist Albert Engström coined the word "Grönköping" in 1895 as a caption for some of his drawings, thereby inventing the fictional Swedish town of the same name. In 2002 the CD Grönköping Tar Ton was issued in Sweden to commemorate one hundred years of Grönköpings Veckoblad (Grönköping's Weekly), a satirical monthly magazine that was founded in 1902. The album, depicting Grönköping in recordings made between 1908 and 1946, has two recordings by Calle Lindström .

== Legacy ==
Calle Lindström never visited the United States, but some of his songs and stories made the journey. Several of his recordings were repackaged for the American market and issued on Victor Records. Songs such as Sven Svenssons Sven and Josefin mä symaskin (Josefin with the sewing machine) were recorded in New York City by other Swedish-born artists. In 1972 the Swedish actor John Harryson released cover versions of two songs written by Lindström. More than a half century after his death there continues to be interest in Lindström's recordings, which are sold in the original vinyl format and as digital downloads or posted on video-sharing websites.

== Selected discography ==
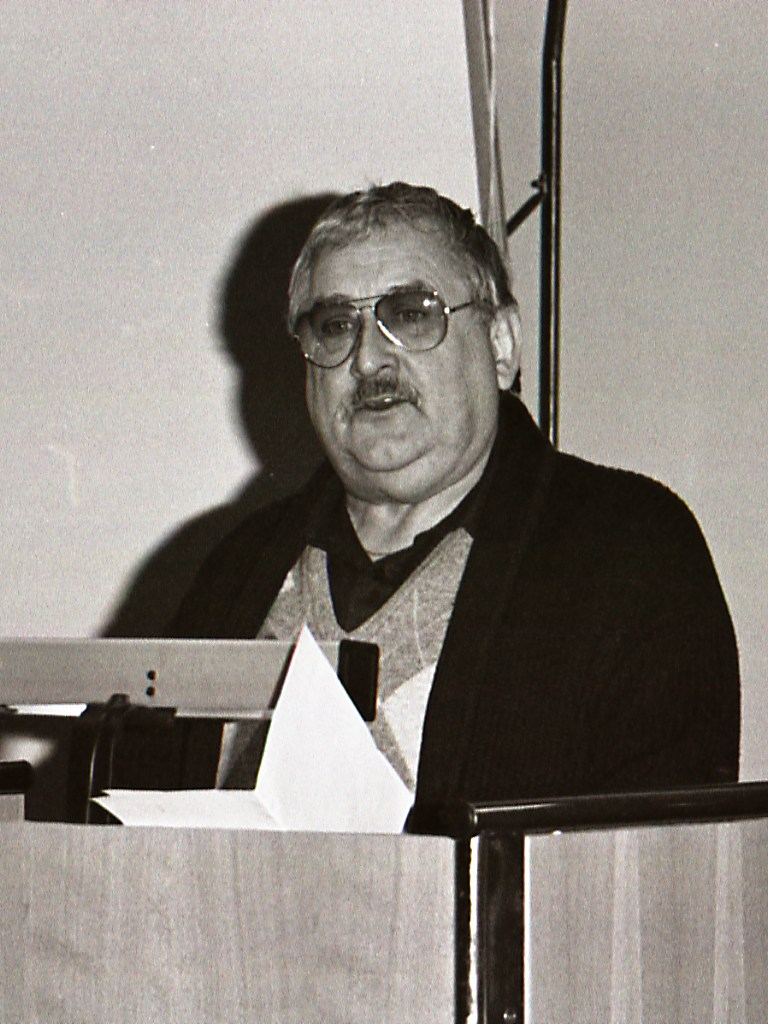
John Harryson

- Cecilia Vals: John Harryson 1972
- Chikago: Anne-Charlotte Harvey 1996
- Chikago: John Berquist and the South Side Swedes 2001
- Chikago: Lucas Stark och Bruksorkestern 2009
- Grönköping Tar Ton: various artists 2002
- Josefin (with the sewing machine): Jack Pearson 2000
- Mitt Handklaver: John Harryson 1972

== Selected bibliography ==
- Emigrantvisor 1981: Swedish lyrics for Chikago and musical notation
- Mel Bay's Immigrant Songbook 1992: Swedish and English lyrics for Chikago, guitar chords and piano arrangement
- Mike and Else's Swedish Songbook 1997: Swedish and English lyrics for Chikago, guitar chords and piano arrangement
