= Calle Krantz =

Swedish ice hockey player (born 1997)

- Born: 8 April 1997 (age 28); Skellefteå, Sweden
- Height: 6 ft 4 in (193 cm)
- Weight: 198 lb (90 kg; 14 st 2 lb)
- Position: Defence
- Shoots: Left
- SHL team: Linköpings HC, Ha74
- Playing career: 2015–present

Calle Krantz (born 8 April 1997) is a Swedish ice hockey player. He is currently playing with Linköpings HC of the Swedish Hockey League (SHL).

== Career ==
Born in Skellefteå, Sweden, Krantz played junior hockey with local team Skellefteå AIK in 2011–12; before joining Linköpings HC at the age of 15. In 2012, Krantz competed with a regional all-star team from Västerbotten in the annual TV-pucken, an under-15 national tournament, and recorded one assist over eight games. The following season, he dressed for 13 U-18 games playing for Linköpings HC. In 2013, Krantz once again participated in the TV-pucken, playing for Västerbotten. In 2014–15, Krantz logged his first minutes for Linköpings HC's J20 SuperElit team at 17 years old, appearing in 44 games. After impressive performances in the youth ranks, Krantz played 7 games in Sweden's top-flight SHL.

== Career statistics ==
=== Regular season and playoffs ===
			Regular season					Playoffs
Season	Team	League	GP	G	A	Pts	PIM	GP	G	A	Pts	PIM
2014–15	Linköping HC	J20	44	3	4	7	16	7	0	2	2	6
2015–16	Linköpings HC	J20	43	3	13	16	26	4	0	1	1	4
2015–16	Linköpings HC	SHL	7	0	0	0	0	—	—	—	—	—
