= Ville-Veikko Eerola =

Finnish ice hockey player

- Born: April 9, 1992 (age 32); Hämeenlinna, Finland
- Height: 6 ft 0 in (183 cm)
- Weight: 187 lb (85 kg; 13 st 5 lb)
- Position: Defence
- Shoots: Left
- SM-liiga team: Lahti Pelicans
- NHL draft: Undrafted
- Playing career: 2012–present

Ville-Veikko Eerola (born April 9, 1992) is a Finnish ice hockey defenceman. His is currently playing with Lahti Pelicans in the Finnish SM-liiga.

Eerola made his SM-liiga debut playing with Lahti Pelicans during the 2012–13 SM-liiga season.
