= Siédougou =

- Location in Burkina Faso
- Coordinates: 13°19′N 0°15′W
- Country: Burkina Faso
- Region: Est Region
- Province: Gnagna Province
- Department: Manni Department

Population (2019)
  - Total: 2,060

Siédougou is a town in the Manni Department of Gnagna Province in eastern Burkina Faso.

Population
Year	Pop.	±%
1985	1,101	—
2006	2,264	+105.6%
2019	2,060	−9.0%
