= IFA Wartburg =

Satirical Swedish band

- Logo of IFA Wartburg, a circular version of the Flag of East Germany with slight modifications.

Background information
- Origin: Upplands Väsby, Sweden
- Genres: Satirical; eclectic; bossa nova; pop; ska; jazz; swing
- Years active: 1984–1999
- Label: Plattenmeister
- Past members: Magnus Michaeli (Rolf Kempinski); Nils Lundwall (Heinz Klinger)
- Website: plattenmeister.de/ifa-wartburg/index.htm (old website) ifawartburg.se (new website)

IFA Wartburg was a satirical Swedish student band inspired by the culture of the former German Democratic Republic (commonly known as East Germany) formed by Magnus Michaeli and Nils Lundwall under the aliases Rolf Kempinski and Heinz Klinger. The band was formed in 1984 in Upplands Väsby and disbanded in 1999 for a combination of personal differences and different life wishes.

Named after the East German auto brand Wartburg, built by IFA, their lyrics are written in German and evoke the vocabulary of the GDR in a playful tone. Some song titles include Frau Gorbatschowa tanzt Bossanova ("Mrs. Gorbachev dances bossa nova"), Es ist nicht so schlimm auf der Insel Krim ("It's not so bad on the island of Crimea"), Agrarwissenschaft im Dienste des Sozialismus ("Agriscience in the Service of Socialism"), Freie Deutsche Jugend ("Free German Youth"), Der Alte Böse Kapitalismus ("The Old Evil Capitalism"), Zwei Tage in Berlin ("Two Days in Berlin"), and Hallo, Guter Kommunist ("Hello, Good Communist").

Their music is eclectic in influence, ranging from bossa nova (Frau Gorbatschowa tanzt Bossanova) and pop/ska (Freie Deutsche Jugend) to jazz and swing (Spassjazz). The band itself stated that the genre of their music was "Mauer Power" (a reference to the Berlin Wall) and "Russian Roll", although this was likely a joke.

Günther Raubschaentze, a fictional character which is most likely Nils himself, runs a YouTube channel and a website for the band. As of October 2026, the YouTube channel had amassed over 7.6 million views and 16.6k subscribers. IFA Wartburg also had a Spotify account that, as of June 2026, had over 94,000 monthly listeners. In September 2024, IFA Wartburg's music was removed from online music streaming services after a person named Losi Gaydyn copyrighted the songs from the album Im Dienste des Sozialismus, although the songs could still be accessed through the band's YouTube channel. In January 2025, the album was released again on streaming platforms but was removed swiftly two days later, only to be restored a few days after. After another removal and restoration four days later, the songs can now be found on most streaming platforms.

== Discography ==
- Im Dienste des Sozialismus, CD Album, 1998
- Der Berliner, CD EP, 1998
- Im Dienste des Sozialismus, Vinyl LP (picture disc) with the faces of Erich Honecker and Queen Silvia of Sweden.

== Songs on Im Dienste Des Sozialismus ==
- FDJ (Freie Deutsche Jugend)
- Frau Gorbatschowa Tanzt Bossa Nova
- Kosmoskost
- Zur Konferenz In Rostock
- Es Ist Nicht So Schlimm Auf Der Insel Krim
- Der Alte Böse Kapitalismus
- Hey, Radiofunker
- Agrarwissenschaft im Dienste des Sozialismus
- Zwei Tage In Berlin
- Hallo, Guter Kommunist
- Volkfest in Ukraina
- Der Berliner
- Nightclub In Berlin
- SpassJazz

=== Im Dienste des Sozialismus ===
Im Dienste des Sozialismus

Studio album by IFA Wartburg
- Released: March 1, 1998
- Studio: Gorbyland Studios
- Genres: Folk, synth-pop
- Length: 56:57
- Language: German
- Label: Plattenmeister

The only IFA Wartburg album released to date, Im Dienste des Sozialismus ("In the Service of Socialism"), was released on the first of March 1998 on vinyl and CD. The two front-men of the band are credited with writing the album and appear on the front CD sleeve. The album is 56 minutes and 57 seconds long, has 14 songs, and was produced by the label Plattenmeister. The album also came with a 16-page booklet that included pictures and the lyrics to all of the songs.

IFA Wartburg toured Im Dienste des Sozialismus in Germany and Switzerland from 1998 to 1999, attracting the attention of the German media.

=== Der Berliner ===
In addition to Im Dienste des Sozialismus, a CD titled Der Berliner was also released. It included the four following Berlin themed songs from the album:

- Der Berliner
- Zwei Tage In Berlin
- Hey, Radiofunker
- Nightclub In Berlin

=== Other media ===
Many IFA Wartburg recordings saw little commercial distribution, and some are now exclusive to the IFA Wartburg channel on YouTube. They include:

- Meine Möbeln in Köln, live
- Kulturarbeiter des Monats, also live
- Sessel aus Kassel, RealAudio digital download, 1998. Available on Youtube by an unaffiliated channel
- Wenn IFA Wartburg Spielt (1999), YouTube music video, May 2023
- Das Mauer Power, YouTube music video, Nov 2009, recorded 1989
- Im Dienste des KGB, YouTube music video, Feb 2015, recorded 1985
- Wo ist mein Kassler?, YouTube music video, Dec 2023, recorded 1985
- Biologie und Pathologie des Weibes, YouTube music video, Dec 2017, recorded 1985
- Sorbisches Fischerlied, on Medikamentedose, 1999. Available on Youtube

In the aftermath of their sudden surge in popularity online, the band returned to YouTube, uploading a complete live set from 1999 and the previously unheard songs Wenn IFA Wartburg Spielt and Wo ist mein Kassler?

== See also ==
- History of East Germany
- Culture of East Germany
- East German jokes
- Music of Germany
- Ostalgie
- Socialist nostalgia
