= Galería Casas Riegner =

Art gallery in Bogotá, Colombia

Galeria Casas Riegner is a commercial art gallery in Bogotá, Colombia. The gallery is dedicated to represent and promote contemporary Colombian artists internationally. Founded and directed by Catalina Casas, the gallery is regularly participating in international Art Fairs such as Art Basel, Art Basel Miami Beach, Frieze Art Fair and Frieze Art Fair New York.

Galeria Casas Riegner was established in Miami in 2001. In 2004, the gallery relocated from Miami to Bogotá in order to focus its work on the promotion and dissemination of contemporary art within Colombia and abroad. In March 2005 the new gallery opened its doors in Bogotá.

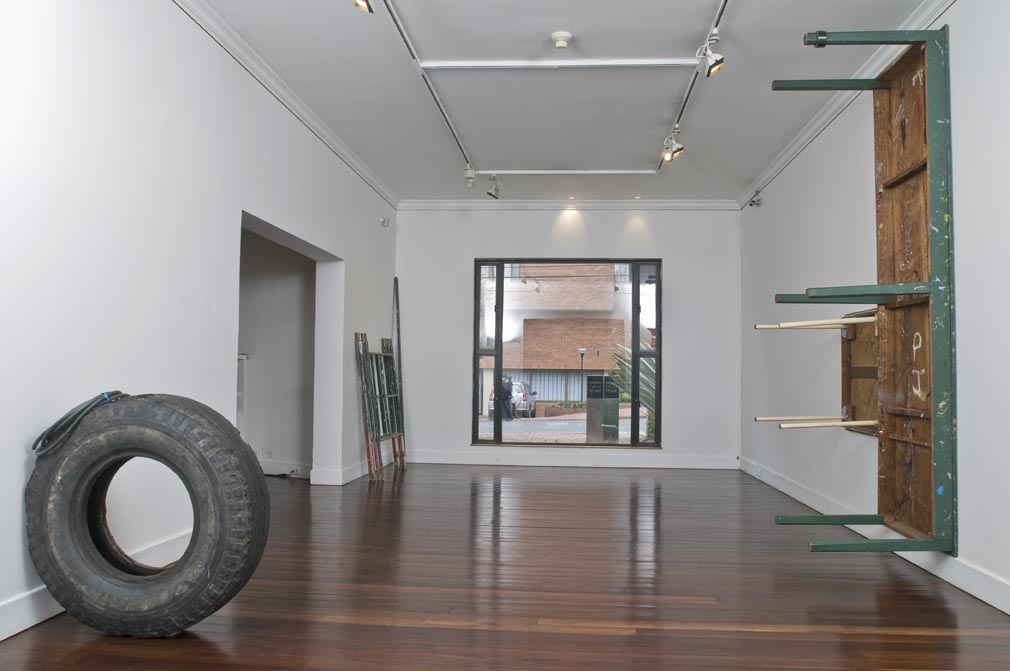
Installation view of Galeria Casas Riegner

== Featured artists ==
- Johanna Calle
- Leyla Cárdenas
- María Fernanda Cardoso
- Antonio Caro
- Fernando Botero
- Tony Cruz
- Mateo López
- Rosario López
- Bernardo Ortiz
- María Fernanda Plata
- Liliana Porter
- Alex Rodríguez
- Miguel Ángel Rojas
- Luis Roldán
- Liliana Sánchez
- Rosemberg Sandoval
- Gabriel Sierra
- Wilger Sotelo
- José Antonio Suárez Londoño
- Angélica Teuta
- Icaro Zorbar
