= Kalle Muuli =

Estonian journalist, writer and politician

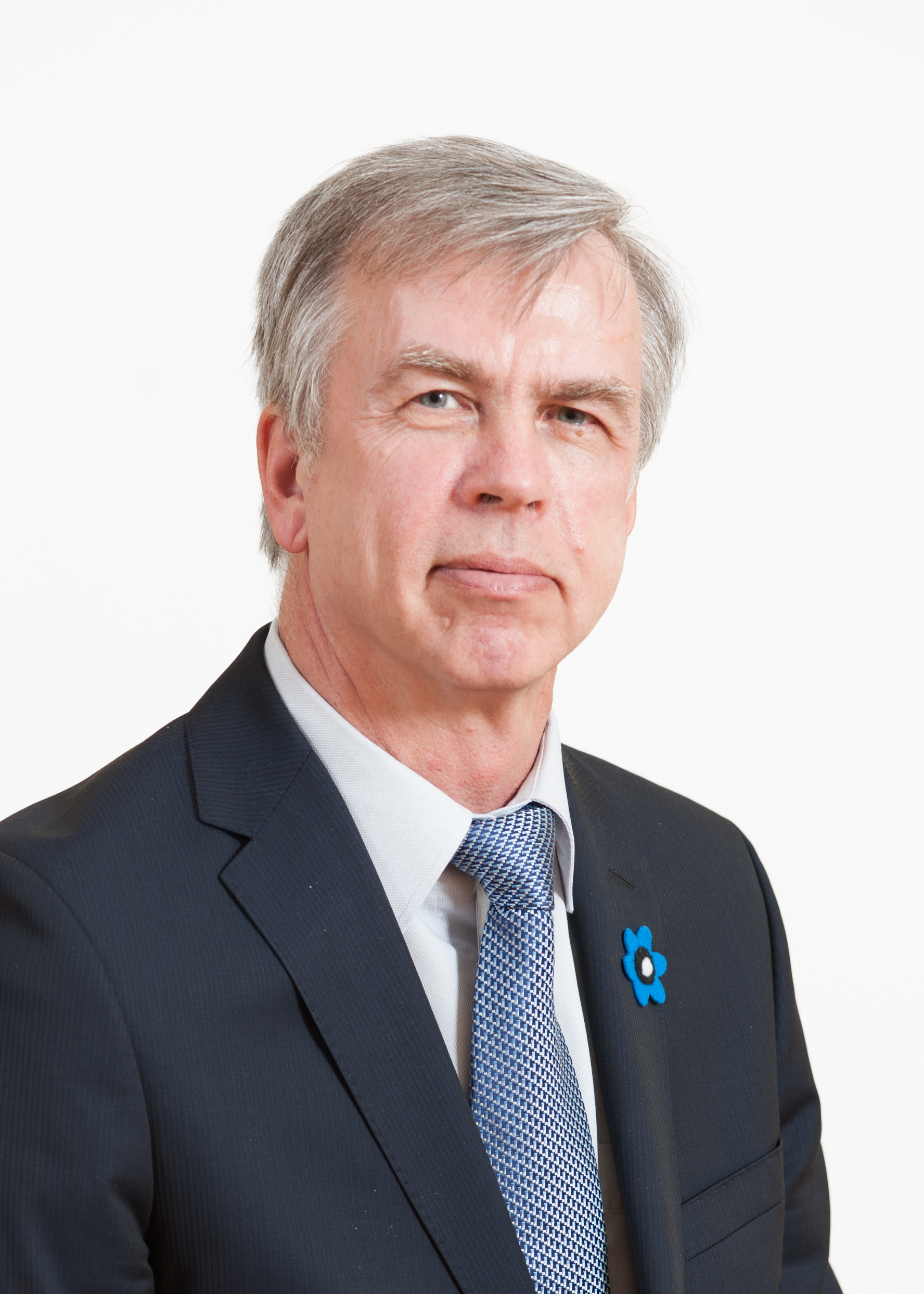
Kalle Muuli

Kalle Muuli (born 10 January 1958 in Tapa) is an Estonian journalist, poet and politician. He was a member of the XIII Riigikogu.
