= Marcel Kalla =

Congolese politician

Marcel Kalla is a Congolese politician who has served as a Deputy in the National Assembly of Congo-Brazzaville since 2012.

== Political career ==
In the June–August 2007 parliamentary election, Kalla stood as an independent candidate in Mabombo constituency, located in Bouenza Region. In the first round of voting, Kalla placed first with 31.25% of the vote, ahead of Christophe Moukouéké, the candidate of the main opposition party, the Pan-African Union for Social Democracy (UPADS), who received 27.42%. Initial results for the second round showed that Kalla won the seat, defeating Moukouéké. However, UPADS contested the result in Mabombo and four other constituencies. On 13 August 2007, Francois Ibovi, the Minister of Territorial Administration, announced a correction in the results for Mabombo, stating that Moukouéké had actually won the seat with 59.01% of the vote; the previously announced result was attributed to a clerical error.

In the July–August 2012 parliamentary election, Kalla stood as the candidate of the Congolese Labour Party (PCT) in Mabombo and won the seat with 57.14% of the vote, defeating Moukouéké.

Standing as a PCT candidate, Kalla was elected as a local councillor in Mabombo in the September 2014 local elections.

In the July 2017 parliamentary election, he was re-elected to the National Assembly as the PCT candidate in Mabombo, winning the seat in the first round with 57% of the vote.
