= Kansara =

Hindu caste in India

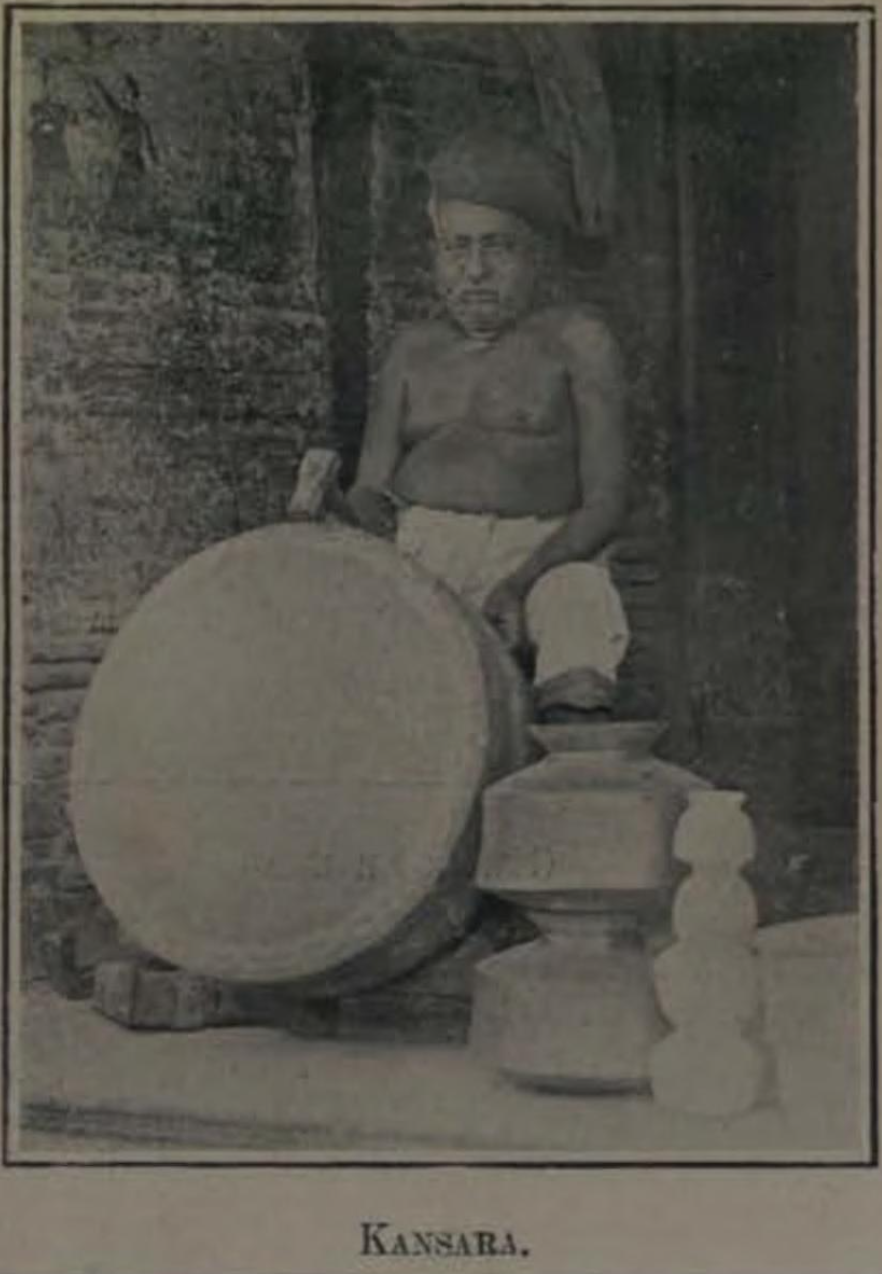
- Kansara man from Baroda State, 1911.

Regions with significant populations
- India

Languages
- Gujarati, Marathi, Konkani, Hindi

Religion
- Hinduism, Christian

The Kansara (or Kasera) is a Hindu caste whose traditional occupation is the making of bronze and metal utensils; now days gold and silver jewelry making and Rogan Painting. they inhabit the Indian states of Gujarat, Maharashtra, Goa and Rajasthan.

== Etymology ==
The Kansara derive their name from Gujarati kan̩su (કાંસુ) meaning bronze.

== History ==
During the Mughal Empire, many Kansaras moved from Gujarat to Maharashtra and Rajasthan. They are an urban caste.

In Goa St Estevam island (formerly known as Juva, Jevem in konkani ) kansara community got converted to Christianity under Portugal rule. They are known as Juevemchem Kansara literally means kansara's from Juvem village.

== Festivals ==
They celebrate all Hindu festivals, though Navaratri and Vijayadashami are the main celebrations. They arrange many cultural functions during the nine days of Navaratri and perform Shastra Puja on the tenth day, i.e., on Vijayadashami. Other important festivals are Deepawali, Raksha Bandhan, Janmashtami, Sahasrarjun Jayanti, Kartik Ekadashi, and Nag Panchami.

== Subgroups ==
The Kansara originally belong to Gujarat, India.

Based on their native place, Gujarati Kansaras are divided into Maru Kansara, Sorathia Kansara Jamnagari Kasera and Surti Kasera. They live in Wadhwan, Surendranagar, Rajkot, Bhavnagar, Kutch and Dhrangadhra.

Kansaras living in Gujarat, Rajasthan and Maharashtra are vegetarian.
