= Kalle Samuelsson =

Swedish bandy player (born 1986)

Kalle Samuelsson (born February 15, 1986) is a Swedish bandy player who plays for Västerås SK as a goalkeeper. Kalle was a youth product of Köpings IS.

Kalle has played for three clubs:

Köpings IS (2003–2004)
Broberg/Söderhamn Bandy (2004–2005)
Västerås SK (2005–present)
