= Calle Asell =

Swedish ice hockey player

- Born: February 27, 1994 (age 31) Upplands Väsby, Sweden
- Height: 6 ft 2 in (188 cm)
- Weight: 174 lb (79 kg; 12 st 6 lb)
- Position: Winger
- Shoots: Left
- SHL team: Örebro HK
- NHL draft: Undrafted
- Playing career: 2013–present

Calle Asell (born February 27, 1994) is a Swedish ice hockey player. He is currently playing with Väsby IK HK in the HockeyEttan.

Asell made his Swedish Hockey League debut playing with Örebro HK during the 2013–14 SHL season.
