= Johanna Calle =

Colombian artist (born 1965)

- Born: 1965 (age 60–61); Bogotá, Colombia

Johanna Calle (born 1965) is a Colmbian artist. She is based in Bogotá.

Calle's art involves the following themes: Latin American Art, Andes Region (Bolivia, Colombia, Ecuador, Peru, Venezuela), Urbanization, Political Minimalism, The City, Language, Women Artists, Gender, Work on Paper, Repetition, Patterns, Globalization.

== Life and education ==
Johanna Calle was born in 1965 in Bogotá. She studied visual arts in the Talleres Artisticos program at the University of the Andes in Bogotá from 1984 to 1989 where she earned her BA in Art. In 1993, she earned her Masters of the Arts from Chelsea College of Art and Design in London. She currently lives in Bogotá today and is married to antiquarian Julio Cesar Perez Navarrete who also is a buyer of photographic archives and documentaries. He helps her research and collaborates on several of her projects.

== Career and work ==
Calle originally started working with traditional oil painting but decided to dedicate her work to drawing in 1994. She now works mostly with drawing and explores the use of line and its possibilities within her art. Calle uses a reduced black and white palette. She uses drawing to experiment with many other materials such as printed text, letraset, aluminum, wire, copper, iron and cloth. She also experiments with different techniques like sewing or knitting on canvas, pyrography, dactylography, collage, and typewriting.

There is a recurring motif that occurs in her work of the collapse of order and subversion of the grid. She plays with juxtapositions in her work like the abstract and the figurative, legible and illegible and the signifier and the signified.

Calle's concepts usually focus on concrete issues of everyday Colombian life but often have a universal message. Some of the topics she covers are gender roles, violence, abuse, malnutrition, poverty, environmental topics, urbanization and communication. Calle's work is delicate and touching when dealing with especially heavy topics. Even though her ideas stem from issues observed within Colombia, they often have a greater global context and relate to many countries on different levels.

Some of projects involve research for statistics, specific files, police data or even certain types of materials. For example, her project Version Oficial (2008) involved searching official accounts issued by the Colombian government about the deaths of people in which she then made them illegible. For Ple de Fotos (2012) she used photos and text from police criminal archives about assassinations and made the photo prints on 1960 Czechoslovak photo paper. For her series Nombre Propio (1997–1999) Calle did a significant amount of research into the cases of abandonment from the Institute for Family and Child Well-Being. She then knit the faces of the children into a kind of family tree. She did this in hopes of locating their parents and uniting them with their families. Her use of embroidery is crucial because it is a slow and time-consuming process. That passing of time is related to the passing of time these children go through to get adopted or forever wait for their parents.

Wire is an integral material for many of her projects and Johanna often uses it alongside drawing. It is a more dimensional form of line and can communicate certain things that simply drawing cannot. Her project Letargia (2001) is a series of portraits that are created by bending wire, attaching it to a board and then encasing it within casein. The casein is then sanded down to reveal the soft, dreamy portraits within. The faces within look detached and dreamy, representing a state of being in between life and death. These ideas relate to a dark history Colombia has of disposing bodies in rivers, their faces floating and rolling on the surface. Obra Negra (2008) also uses wire but to signify scarcity and poverty that the people she is referring to live with. Wire is actually used as a makeshift material in building the humble homes of those in poverty. The project is a series of wire drawings of the unstable homes of the poor. There are people within the houses but they also simultaneously seem to be carrying the weight of them on their backs. There is an ambiguity between whether or not they are trapped within or willingly staying. Submergentes (2010–2011) is a project that uses galvanized mesh as well as letraset and ink to create scenes of people among bent and distorted wire and random numbers. Unemployment and the decrease of economic power are affecting men and thus their families. People are forced to challenge gender roles and masculine behavior as they are altered. The broken wire represents the broken society, gender roles and how significant the change is there. Another project about economic factors but from a different perspective is Imponderables (2009–2010). She also uses fragmented, broken and distorted pieces of wire in a grid-like structure that is a reference to old fashioned accounting books. She says, “These allude to an economic order that has been altered, that will never be restored to its original form…” Once the accountancy grid has been distorted, so too have the numbers that it contained. Thus, the economic order that both small and large business strive to keep. Wire is a strong, yet moldable material, which makes it interesting in the context of society, economy and culture because these aspects are always in flux.

Plants and the environment are also central ideas to many of her projects. Her project Perspectivas (2013) commented on issues of environmental habitats as well as sociological issues within Colombia and other parts of the world. Colombia is rich in biodiversity, birds and reptiles in particular. But every year, seven million animals have their habitats illegally cleared and are shipped and sold around the world for an estimated $40 million. Calle demonstrated this collapse of habitat and freedom by crushing birdcages. The project was furthered by her trip to Vietnam where she noticed similarities in the destruction of forest and habitat. Within the project, there is also a juxtaposition “of the fact that millions of people are also locked out of the possibility of having a home due to overpopulation, as a result of land made uninhabitable by an unfair system of land speculation”. This relates to her Perimetros project where she created forms of a native tree to Mexico by typing on paper from Colombian ledger books. They are used as hand written archives of property ownership. Dominos (2011) is similar to Perimetros in that it is also created by typing text with a typewriter on paper. She uses old account logbooks for the paper. People were being displaced and moved by illegal armed forces and their land conspicuously reassigned. This project is about their loss of environment and stability. There is a juxtaposition within these projects because a tree is a stable, strong object and the paper they are created out of is a fragile, flimsy version of its origin.

Johanna is quoted saying, “To me, the medium of drawing is equal to a language, a language that is constantly adapting itself”. Her interest in language and communication is obvious and prominent in her works. Chambacú Albalá (2007) is a series of drawings that relate to the Arabic language and Moorish ornamentation. The strings of words and phrases in Islamic geometric shapes refer to the fact that a large number of Spanish words have an Arab origin. Within these geometric designs there are flaws and inequalities and shows that even within apparently rational and orderly ideas, there are abnormalities. Things have been changed with the mixing of the cultures. Johanna also says that the use of text in her work is not purely aesthetic. She is interested in how text and words relate to things like linguistic gender discrimination, dialects, names, slang, etymology and indigenous languages. Intemperie (2012–2013) is a project that involves the disjointed phonetic representation of indigenous Colombian languages, languages that don’t have a written form. The typed text that she uses explores the themes of climate change and the alteration of cycles but overall, the project shows the importance of the word and testimony. A similar series Lluvias (2013) consists of 97 drawings that also deal with the phonetic pronunciation of indigenous languages. She believes our reliance on anthropological, ethnographic and semiotic studies of the equivalents of indigenous sounds are related to the intensity, frequency and effects on wildlife like the plants and rivers. And her recently published book Abecé (2012) also deals with language by repeating each letter of the alphabet in different ways and shapes. There is only one letter in a drawing but she uses all 27 letters in the book. It shows that even with distorted and mutilated letters, we have an implicit understanding of what it is and what it means.

== Exhibitions ==
While much of Johanna Calle's solo shows are concentrated to Colombia and South America, she has had several shows abroad in countries such as Switzerland, Vietnam and Portugal. She has also been involved in many collaborative shows with other artists.

=== Solo shows ===
==== 2001–2005 ====
- Nombre propio, Alianza Colombo-Francesa, Bogotá, Colombia (2001)
- Entrelíneas, Exhibition of Drawings, Sala de Arte Biblioteca Luis Echavarría, EAFIT, Medellín, Colombia (2001)
- Insulas, Casa de la Moneda, Biblioteca Luis Ángel Arango, Bogotá, Colombia (2004)
- Retratos, Sala COMFENALCO Antioquia, Medellín, Colombia (2004)
- Tangencias, Sala ASAB, Academia Superior de Artes de Bogotá, Bogotá, Colombia (2005)

==== 2006–2010 ====
- Zona Tórrida, Casas Riegner, Bogotá, Colombia (2006)
- Pretérita, Fundación Alzate Avendaño, Bogotá, Colombia (2006)
- Chambacú Albalá, Palacio de la Inquisición, (organiza SEACEX), Cartagena, Colombia (2007)
- Contables, Faría & Fábregas Gallery, Caracas, Venezuela (2007)
- Laconia, IV Premio Luis Caballero, Galería Santa Fe, Planetario Distrital, Bogotá, Colombia (2007)
- Dibujos (Cuarted by Virginia Pérez-Ratton), FundaciónTeorética. San José, Costa Rica (2008)
- Perspectivas, MUZAC, Córdoba, Colombia (2010)
- Contables, Zona Maco Sur, Mexico City, Mexico (2010)
- Variaciones Dibujos, Casas Riegner, Bogotá, Colombia (2010)

==== 2011–2015 ====
- Signos, Casas Riegner, Bogotá, Colombia (2011)
- Submergentes: A Drawing Approach to Masculinities (Curated by Cecilia Fajardo-Hill), Museum of Latin American Art (MOLAA), Long Beach, United States (2011)
- Irregular Hexagon, Colombian Art in Residence (curated by José Roca), Sàn Art, HCM City, Vietnam (2012)
- Recent Drawings (Curated by Adriano Pedrosa), Marilia Razuk Gallery, São Paulo, Brazil (2012)
- Frieze Art Fair, Casas Riegner, London, United Kingdom (2013)
- Krinzinger Residencies, Krinzinger Gallery, Vienna, Austria (2013)
- Perspectivas, Ivo Kamm Gallery, Zurich, Switzerland (2013)
- Indicios, Casas Riegner, Bogotá, Colombia (2014)
- Grafos, Galeria Marilia Razuk, São Paulo, Brazil (2014)
- Est Art Fair, Estoril, Portugal (2014)
- Silentes 1985-2015, Museo de Arte del Banco de la República, Bogotá, Colombia (2015)

== Distinctions and awards ==
=== 1992–1999 ===
- Scholarship, British Council, London, England (1992)
- Mention, VI Salón de Arte Joven, Colcultura, Bogotá, Colombia (1996)
- Portafolio AGPA, Smurfit Cartón de Colombia (1996)
- First Prize Uniandinos a las Artes, Asociación de Egresados de la Universidad de los Andes, Bogotá, Colombia (1999)

=== 2000–2005 ===
- Premio Salón Regional de Artistas, Ministerio de Cultura, Bogotá, Colombia (2000)
- Premio Ciclo Jóvenes Artistas Colombianos, Alianza Colombo Francesa y Embajada de Francia, Bogotá, Colombia (2000)
- Scholarship Cité International des Artes, AFFA Asociación Française des Affaires Etrangeres, París, France (2001)
- Nominated for IV Premio Luis Caballero, IDCT, Bogotá, Colombia (2005)
- Premio I Bienal de Artes Graficas Alternativas ASAB (Academia Superior de Artes de Bogotá), Bogotá, Colombia (2005)
- Mention, Salón Regional de Artistas, Ministerio de Cultura, Bogotá, Colombia 2005)

=== 2006–2011 ===
- Guest Artist, Cart(ajena) SEACEX España (2007)
- Honorable Mention, IV Premio Luis Caballero, Bogotá, Colombia (2007)
- Nominated for CIFO, Cisneros Fontanals Art Foundation, Miami, United States (2007)
- Emerging Artists Grants Program, Cisneros Fontanals Art Foundation CIFO, Miami, United States (2008)
- Solo Projects, Arco, Madrid, Spain (2008)
- Selected artist to intervene the Bicentennial Urn in Bogotá, Bogotá, Colombia (2011)
