= Kalle Eerola =

Finnish footballer (born 1983)

Personal information
- Date of birth: 1 November 1983 (age 43)
- Place of birth: Lahti, Finland
- Height: 1.80 m (5 ft 11 in)
- Position: Left-back

Senior career*
Years	Team	Apps	(Gls)
2001	Pallo-Lahti	16	(0)
2002–2004	Lahti	33	(0)
2005–2006	FC Haka	30	(1)
2007–2009	Lahti	75	(3)
2010	SalReipas	0	(0)
2010–2011	Lahti	28	(2)
Total		182	(6)
- * Club domestic league appearances and goals

Kalle Eerola (born 1 November 1983) is a Finnish former professional footballer who played as a left-back.

== Career ==
He won the Finnish Cup with FC Haka in 2005. He retired from football in 2013 as part of the Ilves reserve team.
