= Kossin Province =

Coordinates: 12°44′N 3°51′W

Kossin
- Province
- Location in Burkina Faso

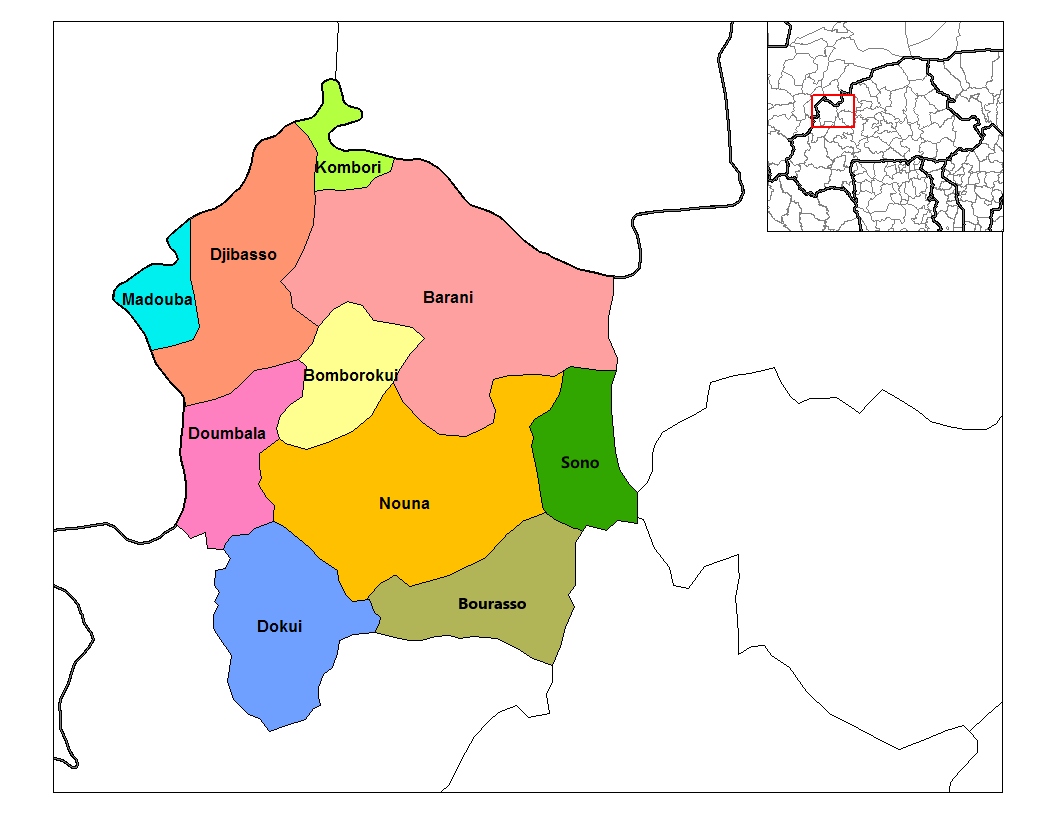
- Provincial map of its departments
- Country: Burkina Faso
- Region: Boucle du Mouhoun
- Capital: Nouna

Area
  - Province: 7,328 km^{2} (2,829 sq mi)

Population (2019 census)
  - Province: 355,655
  - Density: 48.53/km^{2} (125.7/sq mi)
  - Urban: 32,428
- Time zone: UTC+0 (GMT 0)

The Province de la Kossin (known as Kossi until 2025) lies in the western part of Burkina Faso and stretches to the border with Mali. It is in the Boucle du Mouhoun Region. The capital of Kossi is the town of Nouna, which has a mayor and high commissioner. The next largest town in Kossin is Djibasso, the last major town on the road from Nouna that heads west into Mali.

In the early 2010s, a major road through the Kossin was paved with support from the Millennium Challenge Corporation. The road links the major towns of Dedougou and Nouna, then continues westward to Djibasso and the border with Mali.

== Education ==
In 2011 the province had 214 primary schools and 20 secondary schools.

== Healthcare ==
In 2011 the province had 22 health and social promotion centers (Centres de santé et de promotion sociale), 5 doctors and 93 nurses.

== Demographics ==
The population of Kossi in 2006 was 272,223. It is a rural province with 253,793 of its residents living in the countryside; only 18,440 live in urban areas. There are 135,342 men living in Kossi Province and 136,891 women.

== Departments ==
Kossi is divided into 10 departments:

The Departments of Kossin
Departments	Capitals	Population (Census 2006)
Barani Department	Barani	44,237
Bomborokui Department	Bomborokui	15,257
Bourasso Department	Bourasso	12,548
Djibasso Department	Djibasso	49,730
Dokuy Department	Dokuy	28,642
Doumbala Department	Doumbala	26,643
Kombori Department	Kombori	8,300
Madouba Department	Madouba	6,590
Nouna Department	Nouna	70,010
Sono Department	Sono	7,276

== See also ==
- Regions of Burkina Faso
- Provinces of Burkina Faso
- Departments of Burkina Faso
