= Sono =

Sono, SONO, or SoNo may refer to:

== Places ==
- SoNo, Atlanta, a district in the city of Atlanta, Georgia
- Sono Department, a department in Burkina Faso
- South Norfolk, Virginia, a former independent city in the South Hampton Roads region of eastern Virginia and is now a section of the city of Chesapeake
- South Norwalk, Connecticut or "SoNo", a neighborhood in Norwalk, Connecticut
- Sono, Jamui, a village in the Indian state of Bihar
- SoNo Collection, an upscale shopping mall in Norwalk, Connecticut

== People ==
Surname

- Ayako Sono (曽野 綾子; 1931–2025), Japanese writer
- Mari Sono (園まり; 1944–2024), Japanese singer and actress
- Sono Sachiko (園 祥子; 1867–1947), Japanese concubine of Emperor Meiji of Japan
- Sion Sono (園 子温; born 1961), Japanese filmmaker, author, and poet
- Teruko Sono (園 輝子; 1846–1925), Japanese educational reformer, lawyer, author, businesswoman and scholar

Name

- Sono Osato (大里 ソノ; 1919–2018), American dancer and actress
- Sono Osato (artist) (born 1960) American artist born in Baden Baden, Germany

== Music groups ==
- SONO (vocal group), an a cappella music group from Denmark
- Sono (band), a band from Germany

== Other uses ==
- Sono arsenic filter, a water filter
- Sono Motors, a German electric carmaker, behind the Sion (electric car)
