= Valmet Raceabout =

Car model

Overview
- Manufacturer: Valmet Automotive
- Production: 2002–2005
- Assembly: Finland: Uusikaupunki

Body and chassis
- Class: Sports car (S)
- Body style: 2-door roadster
- Layout: Rear-mid-engine, rear-wheel drive

Powertrain
- Transmission: 5-speed manual

The Valmet Raceabout is a limited-edition sports car manufactured by the Finnish company Valmet Automotive as a two-seater, mid-engine, rear-wheel-drive roadster. It was produced between 2002 and 2005.

== History ==
Valmet Automotive is a Finnish vehicle contract manufacturer. It historically produced cars in Finland under orders from companies such as the Swedish company Saab (formerly known as Saab-Valmet), the Russian company Lada, the German companies Opel, Porsche, and Mercedes-Benz, and the American company Fisker, among others. The project started in 1998 at the Helsinki Polytechnic School of Technology's automotive engineering laboratory, the full-scale model was completed in 1999 and a chassis was presented at the Helsinki Motor Show, and in 2000 the world debut of a working prototype made in collaboration with Valmet took place at the Geneva International Motor Show. In 2005, at the same motor show, Valmet presented its final Raceabout.

== Specifications ==
The Raceabout is a 2-seater roadster with an aluminum riveted monocoque chassis, with over 2,000 aircraft-grade rivets. The body panels are removable and are made of a carbon composite material weighing approximately 30 kg, manufactured using different techniques. The interior has carbon composite panels, Sparco sport seats with 4-point harnesses. Double wishbone suspension front and rear, with custom Koni dampers with adjustable rebound. The engine is a Saab-built all-aluminum inline-4 with a custom intercooler and free-flow air filter. It also features a Kemira Metalkat dual-catalyst exhaust system and a single muffler. The transmission is a 5-speed manual with a Torsen differential lock.
