= Valmet Automotive =

Finnish automotive company

Coordinates: 60°48′32″N 21°26′45″E

Valmet Automotive Plc

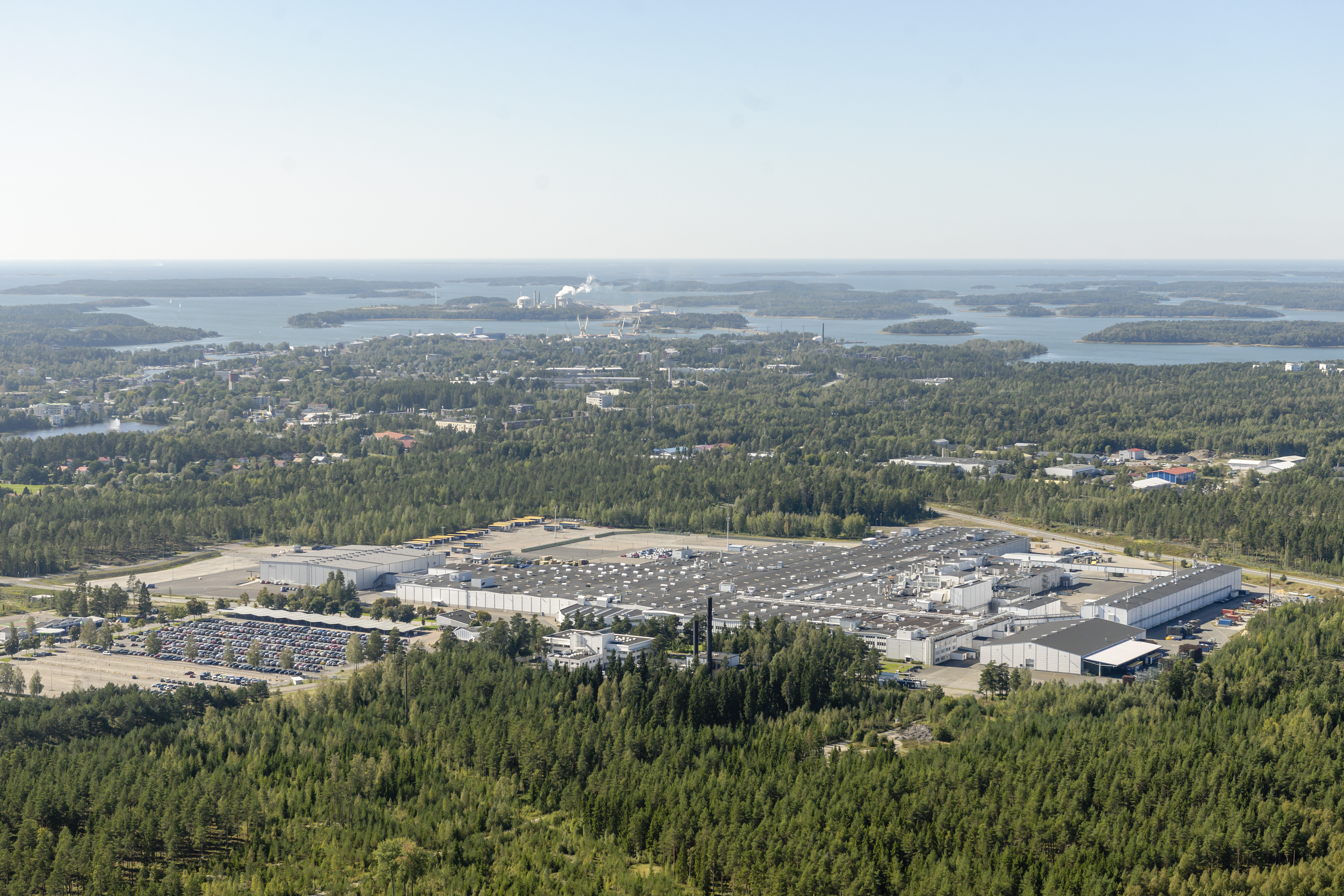
- Type: Incorporation
- Industry: Technology industry, contract manufacturing
- Founded: 1968; 58 years ago
- Headquarters: Uusikaupunki, Finland
- Area served: Worldwide
- Key people: Pasi Rannus (CEO)
- Products: Manufacturing service provider to the automotive industry and beyond. Passenger car contract manufacturing, supplier for development and manufacturing of battery systems as well as a supplier for roof and kinematic systems
- Services: Manufacturing Solutions, contract manufacturing
- Revenue: Gross sales in 2024 EUR 2.3 https://www.valmet-automotive.com/company/facts-figures/ (2024)
- Net income: Net sales EUR 511.4 million (2024)
- Owners: Finnish Government (79%), Pontos Group (21%)
- Number of employees: 1900 (2025)
- Website: www.valmet-automotive.com

Valmet Automotive is a Finnish contract manufacturer and supplier of roof, and kinematic systems.

The company is a trusted partner for industrializing future technologies across automotive, defense, and other high-tech industrial sectors.

Valmet Automotive has manufactured over 1.9 million vehicles at its headquarters in Uusikaupunki, Finland. Its largest shareholders are the Finnish state 79% and the investment company Pontos Group, holding a 21% stake.

== Products ==
Valmet Automotive has two business lines: Manufacturing, and Roof & Kinematic Systems.

In contract manufacturing, Valmet Automotive clients include Mercedes-Benz, Porsche, Saab, Opel and Fisker. Valmet Automotive has produced electric vehicles since 2009. In July 2021, Valmet Automotive was selected to build long-range solar cars for Lightyear 0, which was later canceled. Valmet Automotive also announced a manufacturing contract with Sono Motors for the Sion model in 2022, which was also later canceled.

In July 2012, Daimler AG and Valmet Automotive announced a manufacturing agreement for the Mercedes-Benz A-Class for the Uusikaupunki plant, in Finland. Production began in August 2013. A contract for the production of the Mercedes-Benz GLC-Class was announced in November 2015. The GLC production started in February 2017. In March 2017, Valmet Automotive announced the manufacturing contract with Daimler AG for the next generation Mercedes-Benz compact cars. While the production of the GLC ended in 2022, Valmet Automotive announced a manufacturing contract for the Mercedes-AMG GT 4-Door Coupé.

In 2010, Valmet Automotive took over Karmann's roof business and continued operations at the Osnabrück, Germany, and Żary, Poland, sites. In 2016, Valmet Automotive expanded the Roof Systems business to include Kinematic Systems. Kinematic Systems develops and produces spoiler systems that reduce fuel consumption and extend the range of electrically powered vehicles. The product range also includes kinematic solutions for electric vehicles such as electric charging flaps. The Roof & Kinematic Systems business line's clients includes brands such as Mercedes-Benz, BMW, Mini (BMW Group), Bentley, McLaren Automotive and Porsche.

The EV Systems business line, was renamed as IONCOR in 2024. The companys's subsidiary operates in two battery pack production facilities in Salo, Finland, and in Uusikaupunki, Finland. The battery plant in Salo, Finland, started a large-scale production of 48-volt systems in 2019, and the expansion to include production of high-voltage batteries was completed in the summer of 2021. The battery plant in Uusikaupunki was opened in September 2021; high-voltage batteries for electric vehicles are manufactured there under one roof with vehicle production. A third battery plant in Kirchardt, Germany, is under construction and will open in 2022. The company also has sites for battery testing and engineering in Bad Friedrichshall, Weihenbronn, Munich and Turku (Finland).

In September 2025 Valmet Automotive is reshaping its strategy. In the future, the company will offer its expertise also beyond the automotive industry, for example, to the defense sector. In the changed geopolitical situation, Valmet Automotive’s special expertise in industrial serial production will strongly benefit the whole of Finland. As part of an ownership and financing arrangement enabling Valmet Automotive’s strategic expansion, IONCOR, the company’s subsidiary focused on battery systems, will become a subsidiary of Finnish Minerals Group, a fully state-owned company developing the battery value chain. The Finnish State will become Valmet Automotive’s majority owner, and Pontos Group will continue as a minority owner.

== History ==
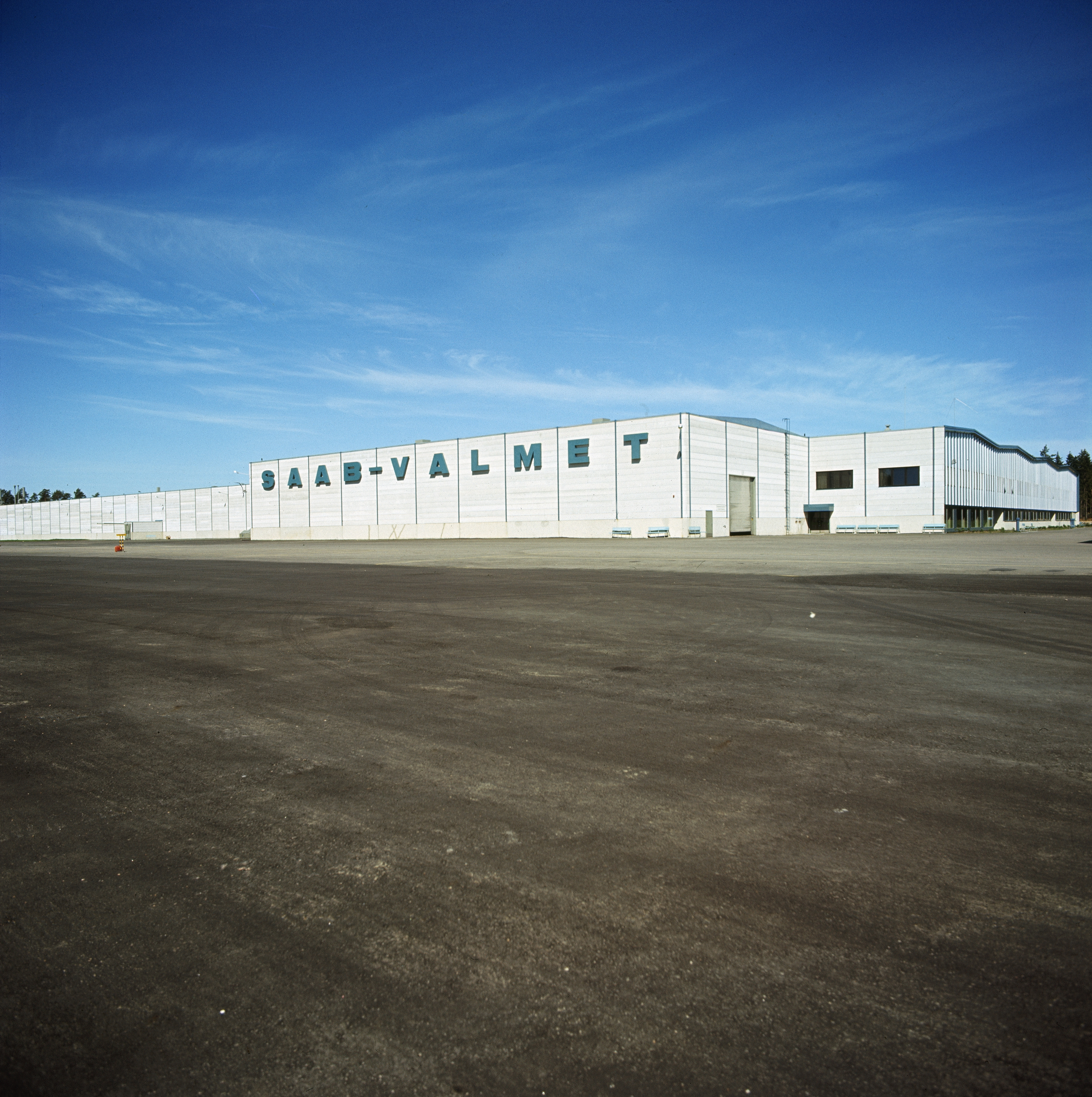
The Saab-Valmet Factory in 1986.

Saab-Valmet was established in 1968 as a joint venture of Finnish Valmet and Swedish Saab-Scania. The automotive plant was placed in Uusikaupunki, Finland, and assembled only Saabs for the first eleven years. Between 1979 and 1985, Valmet also assembled Talbots; a total of 31,978 such cars were built in Finland. Valmet was primarily interested in building the compact Simca-Talbot Horizon, but the French company required Valmet to also assemble the larger (and slow selling) 1307 before they would license the Horizon. Unlike the Saabs, the Simca-Talbots were only meant for local consumption, although a clause in the contract allowed for the possibility of exports if parts made by the thirty local suppliers began to be exported to Talbot's main plants. Domestic parts content increased to thirty percent within a half year of manufacture commencing.

In 1992, Valmet became the sole owner, and the company was renamed Valmet Automotive in 1995. From 1999 to 2010, the sole owner was Metso, after which both Finnish Industry Investment (Tesi) and Pontos Investments bought 34% of the company's shares. On November 4, 2010, Valmet Automotive bought Karmann’s roof-component sections in Osnabrück, Germany, and Żary, Poland. In January 2017, CATL became a 23.08% minority stakeholder in the company, the other shareholders being Pontos and Tesi (Finnish Industry Investment). As of August 2025 the owners of the company are Finnish state (79%) and Pontos (21%).

== Production ==
In line with the company's strategic expansion, Valmet Automotive currently operates as a multi-industry partner for customers in different industrial sectors. In the defense sector Valmet Automotive has announced the cooperation with Finnish defense company Patria to manufacture 6x6 vehicles as of 2026. In the automotive sector, Valmet Automotive is also expanding its offering from passenger cars to bus and coach. Cooperation with Carrus Delta covers Volvo Bus single deck coaches manufacturing in Uusikaupunki starting 2026.

Valmet Automotive's vehicle production includes various Mercedes-Benz models with the Mercedes-Benz A-Class having started production in August 2013, and Mercedes-Benz GLC in 2017. The production of the Mercedes-AMG GT 4-Door Coupé, started in 2023.

In the past, Valmet Automotive produced a range of vehicles, beginning with Saab models from 1969 to 2003. These included the Saab 95, 96, 99, 90, 900, 900 Convertible, 900 CD, 9000, and 9-3 Convertible. They also produced specialized Saab models like the Saab 9-3 Viggen, and the long-wheelbase Finnish domestic market versions of the Saab 99 and Saab 900 (known as the "Finlandia" 5D combi-coupe and as the Saab 900 CD in 4D Sedan form). These models were favored by Finnish municipal and national governments, as well as major Finnish industrial corporations, as official executive vehicles.

From 1979 to 1987, Valmet Automotive produced vehicles for Chrysler/Talbot, including the Simca-Talbot Horizon, Simca 1307/1508, (Talbot 1510), and Talbot Solara. Between 1991 and 1997, they manufactured the Opel Calibra, and from 1996 to 1998, they produced the Lada EuroSamara. Between 1997 and 2011, Valmet worked with Porsche to manufacture the Porsche Boxster and Porsche Cayman. They also built the Garia electric golf car and the Think electric car (including the Th!nk City) from 2009 to 2011.

Other past projects include for example the Fisker Karma for Fisker Automotive from 2011 to 2012, and Mercedes-Benz models from 2013 onwards. They briefly produced the Lightyear 0 starting in November 2022, but the project was canceled in January 2023. Valmet Automotive also produced the Valmet Raceabout, a limited-series sports roadster. A notable canceled production includes Sono Motors' Sion, which was expected to begin production in late 2023 but was ultimately canceled.

== Gallery ==
Car models produced in Uusikaupunki, Finland

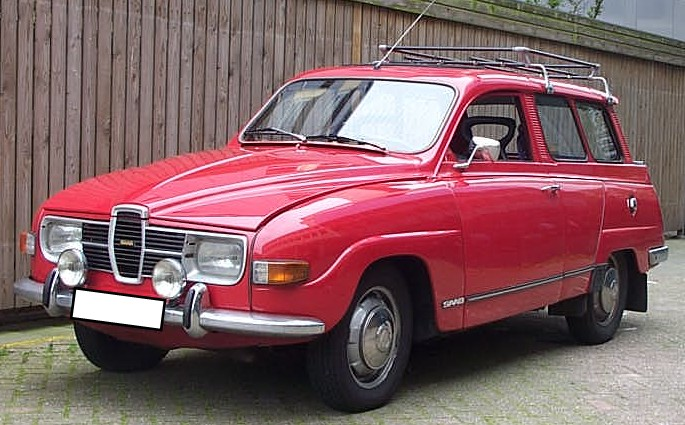
Saab 95

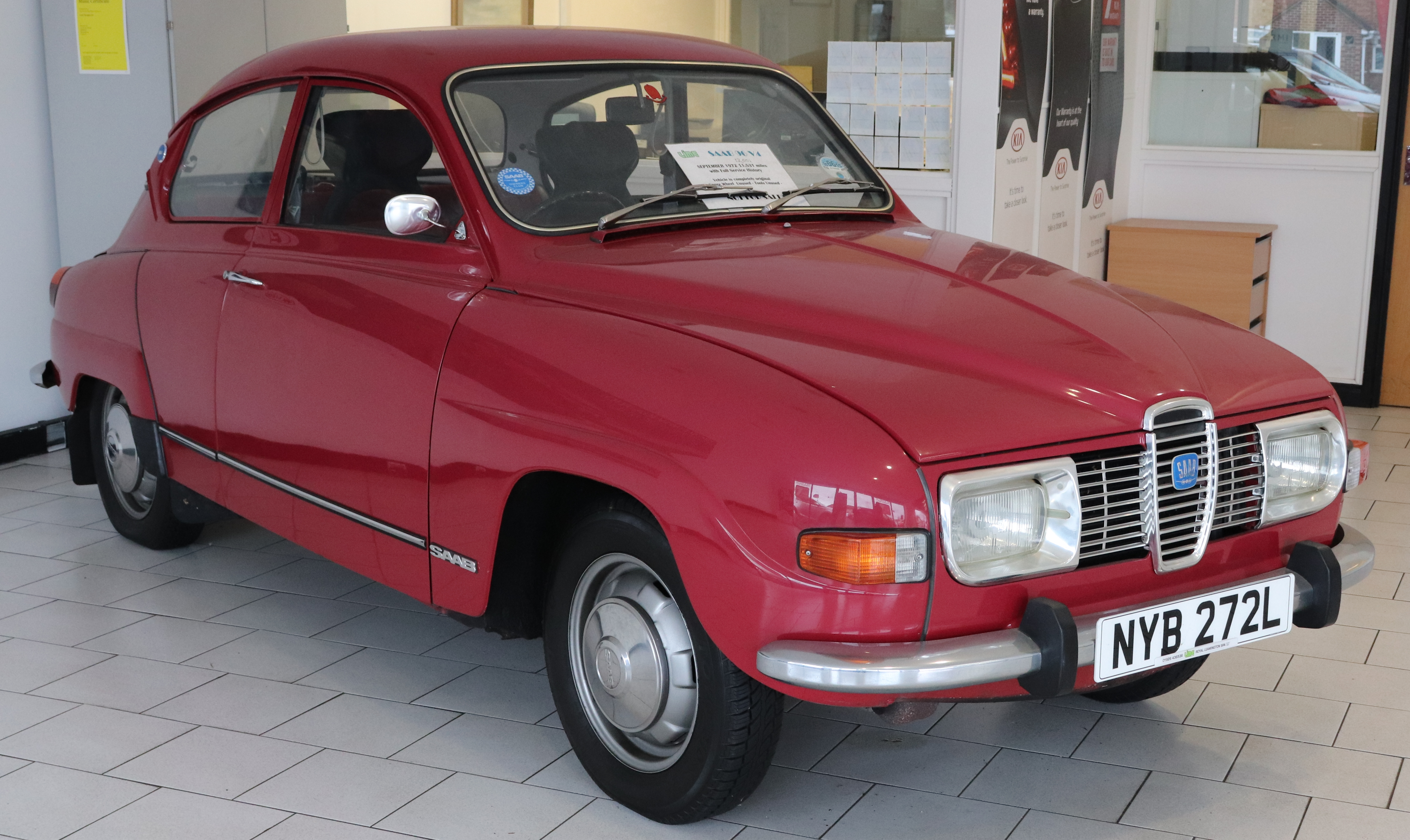
Saab 96

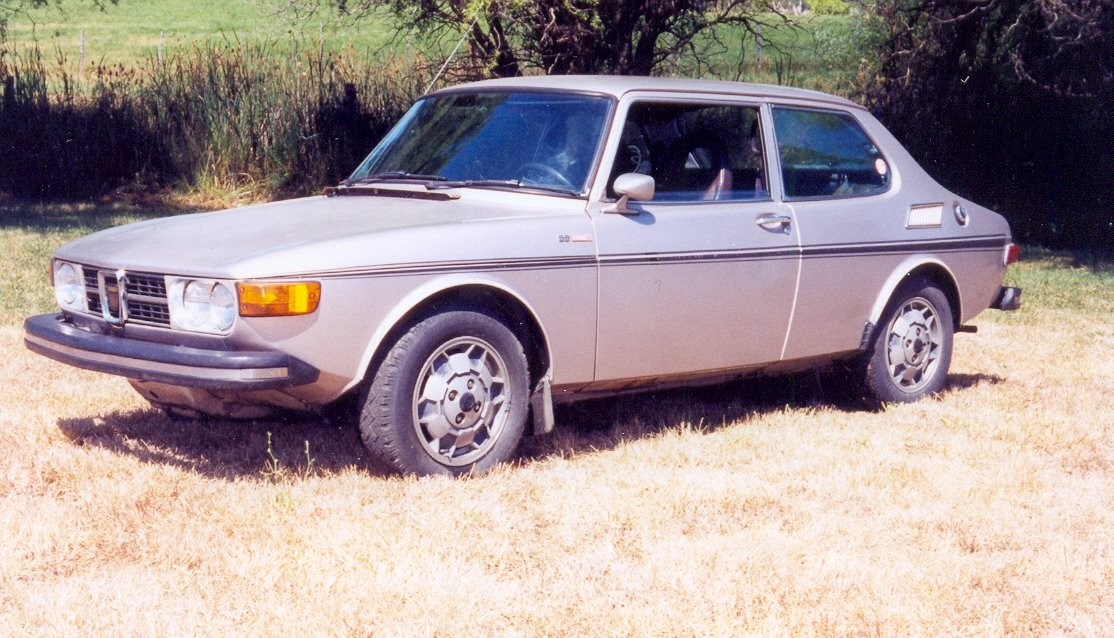
Saab 99

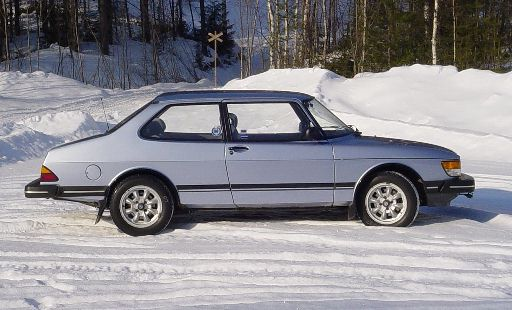
Saab 90

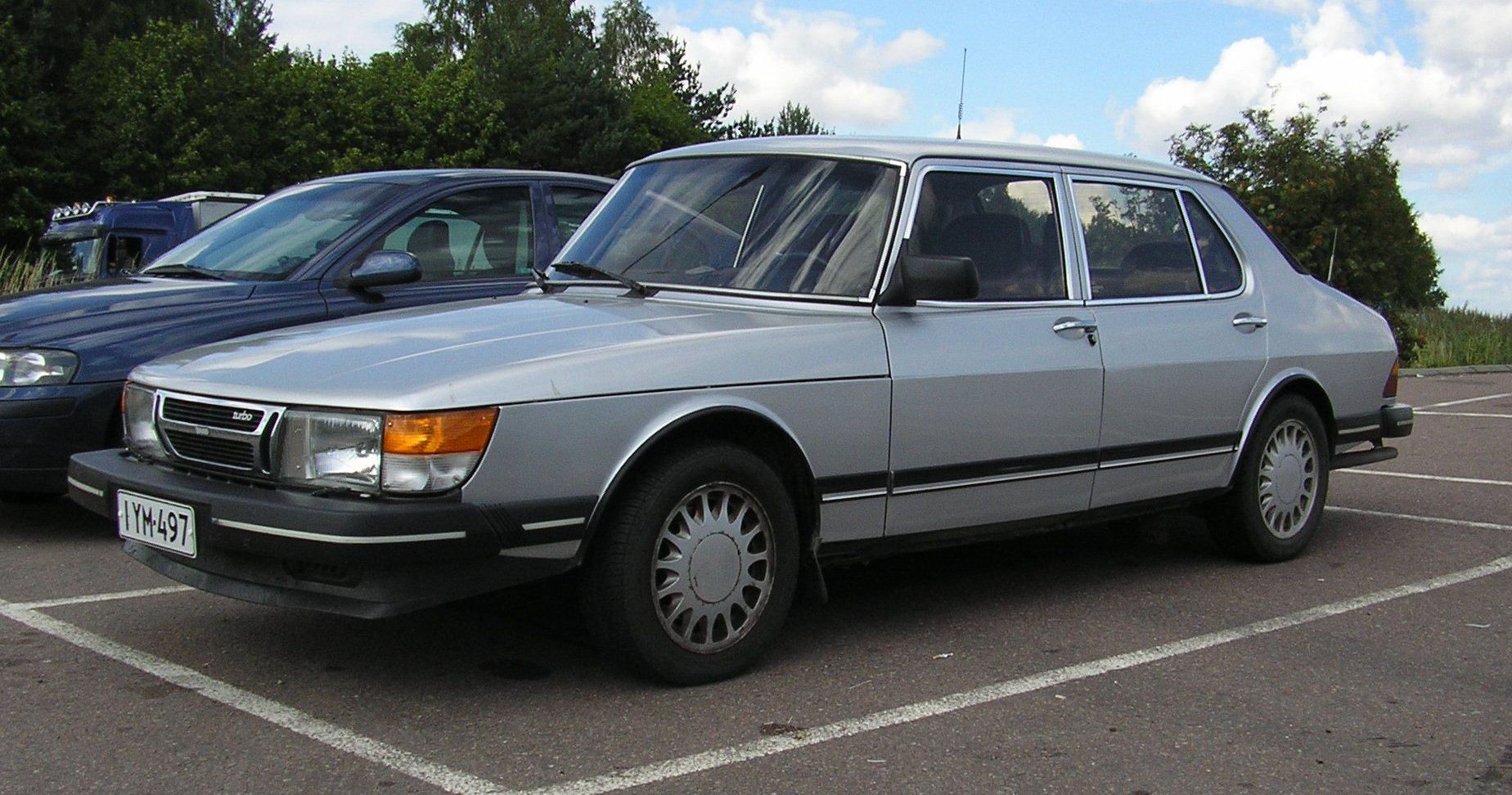
Saab 900 CD (Long Wheelbase Model)

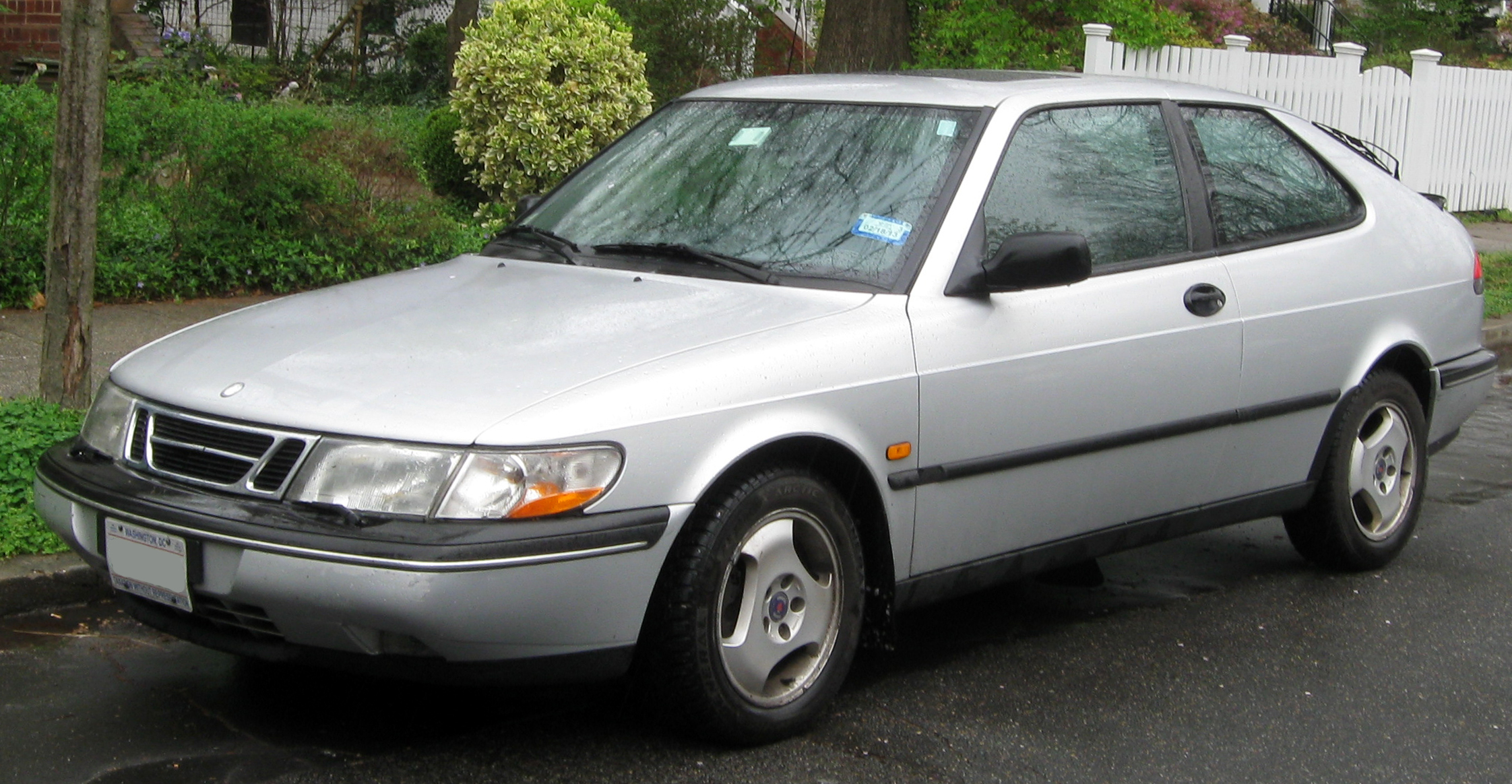
Saab 900 Convertible

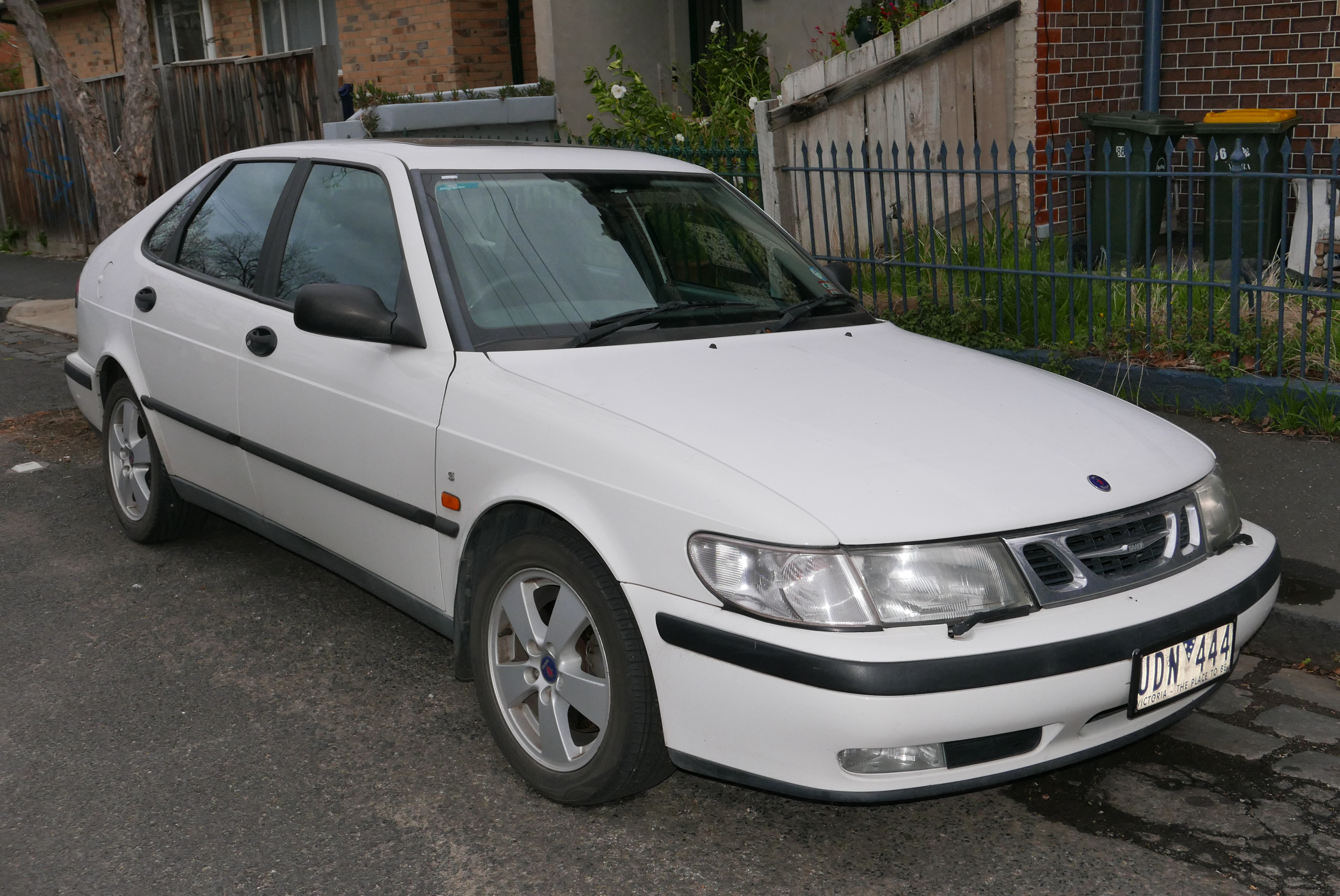
Saab 9-3

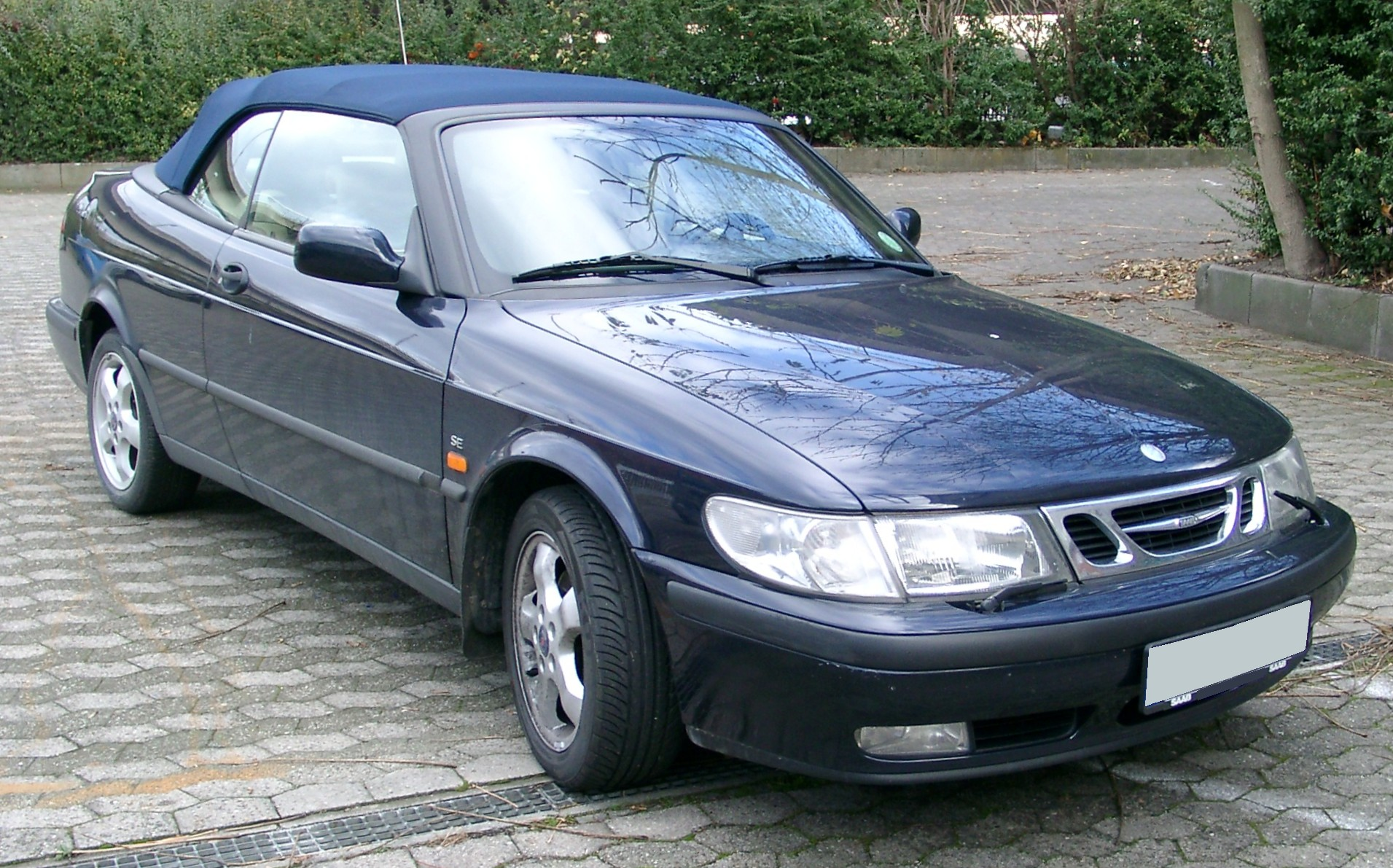
Saab 9-3 Convertible

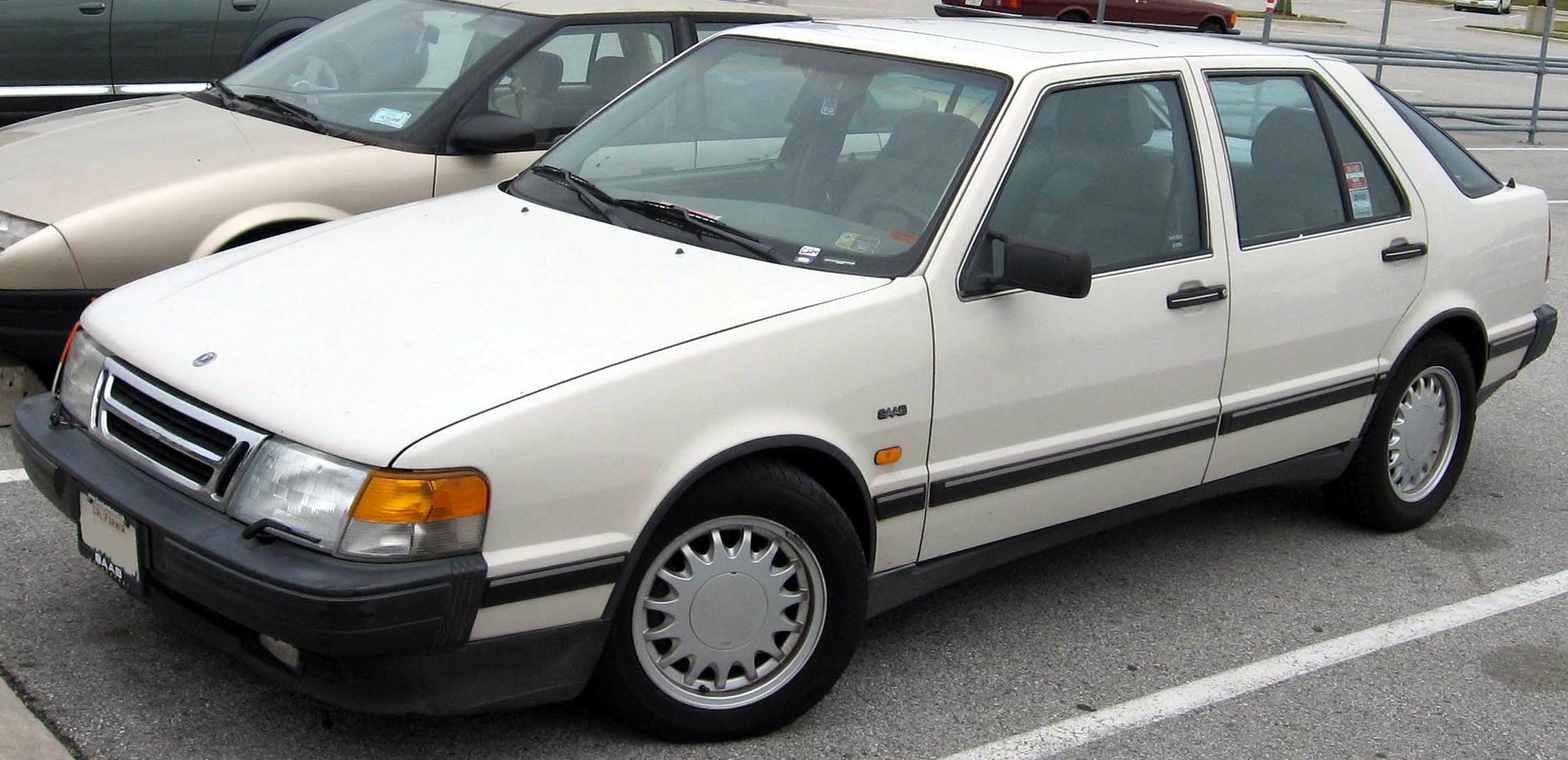
Saab 9000

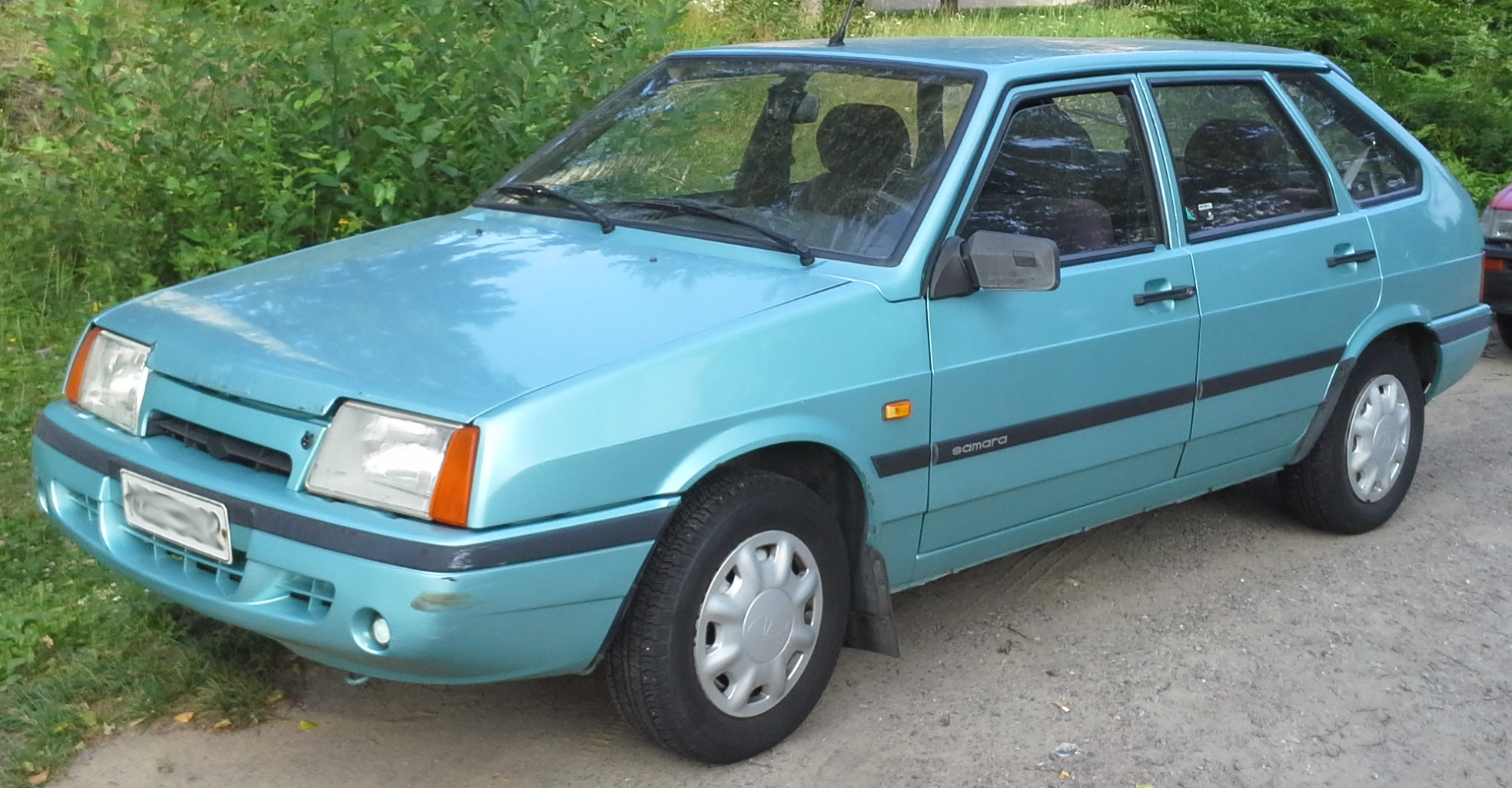
Lada 21093 EuroSamara Baltic

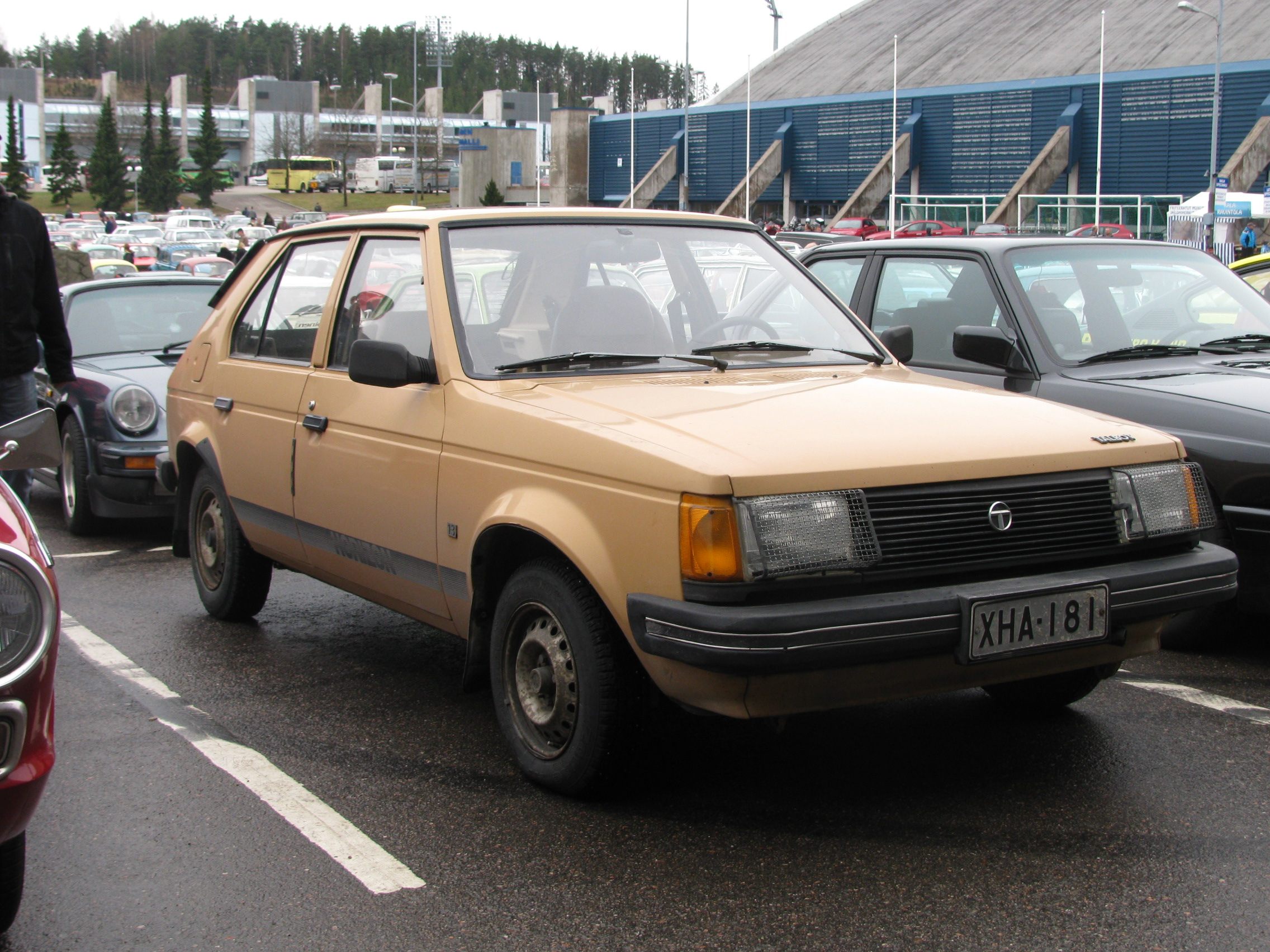
Talbot Horizon GL

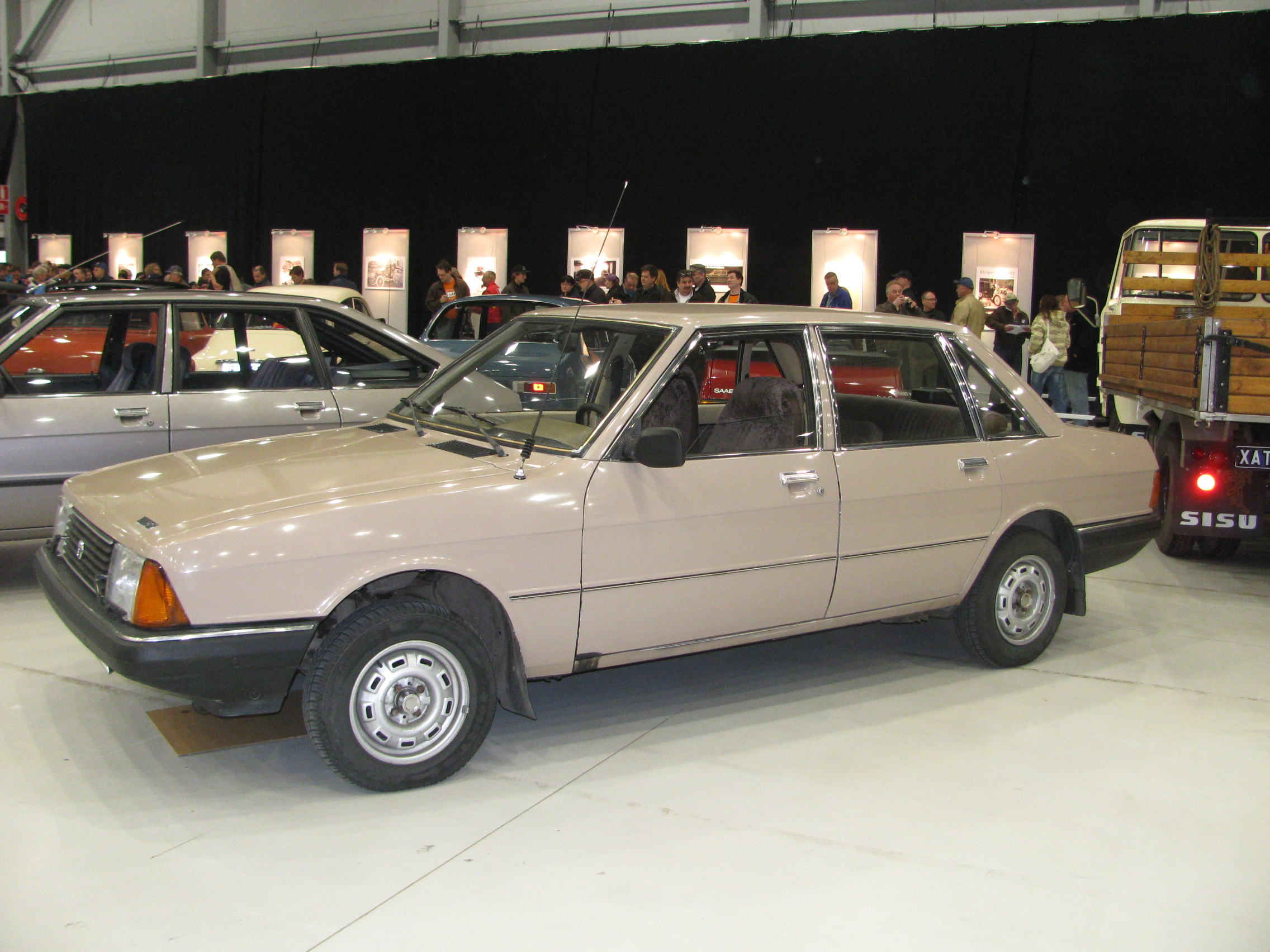
Talbot Solara

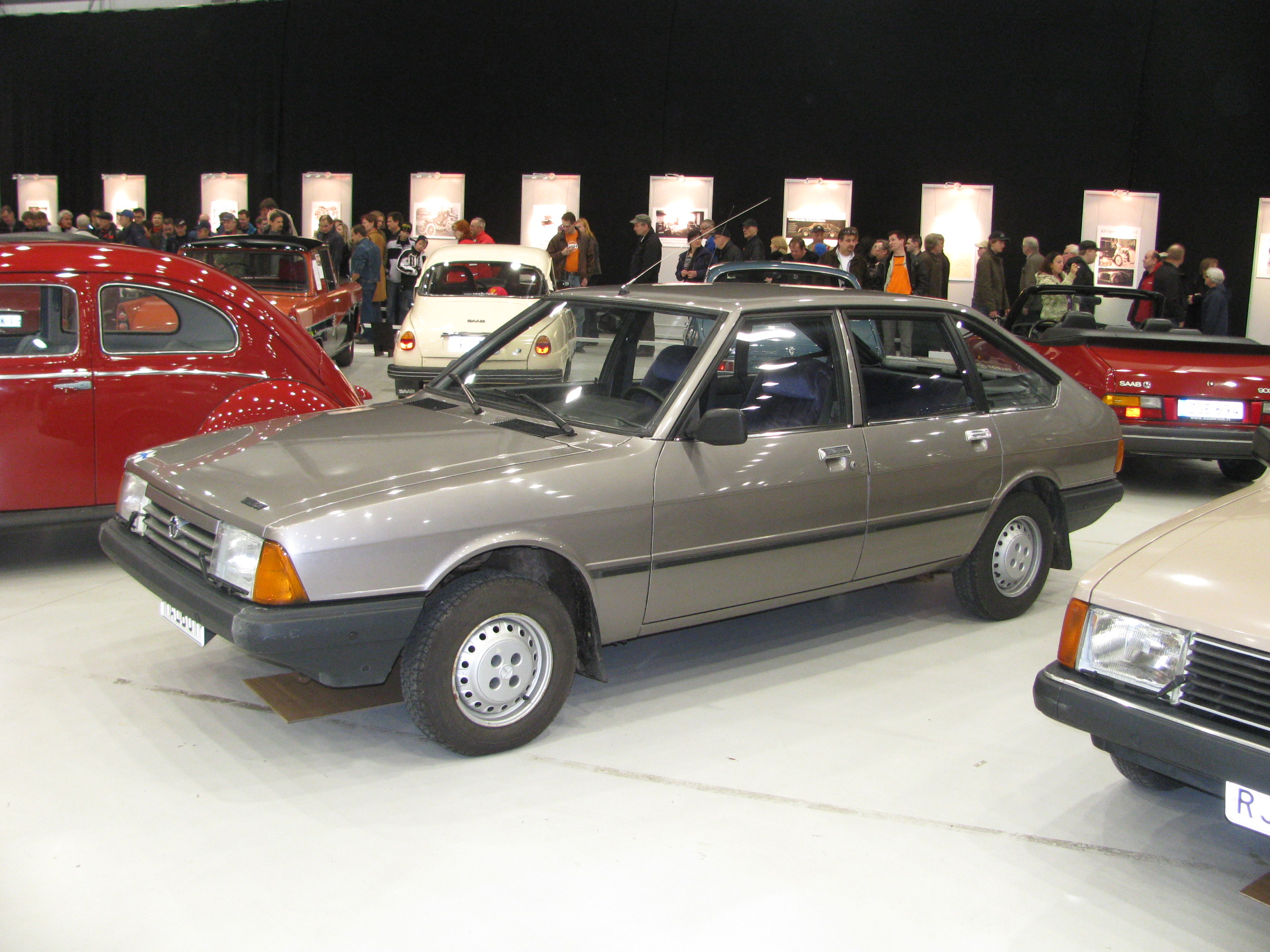
Talbot 1510

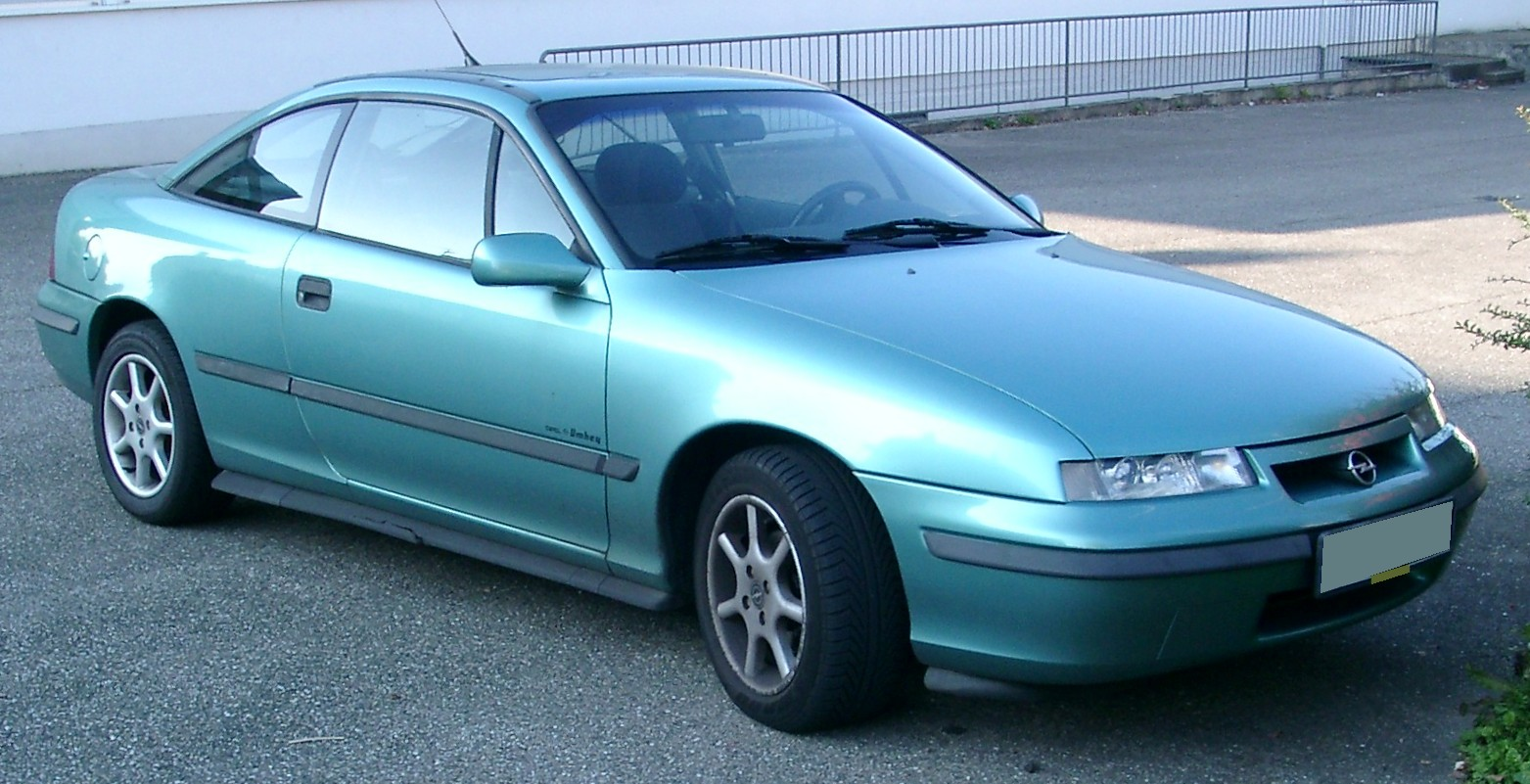
Opel Calibra

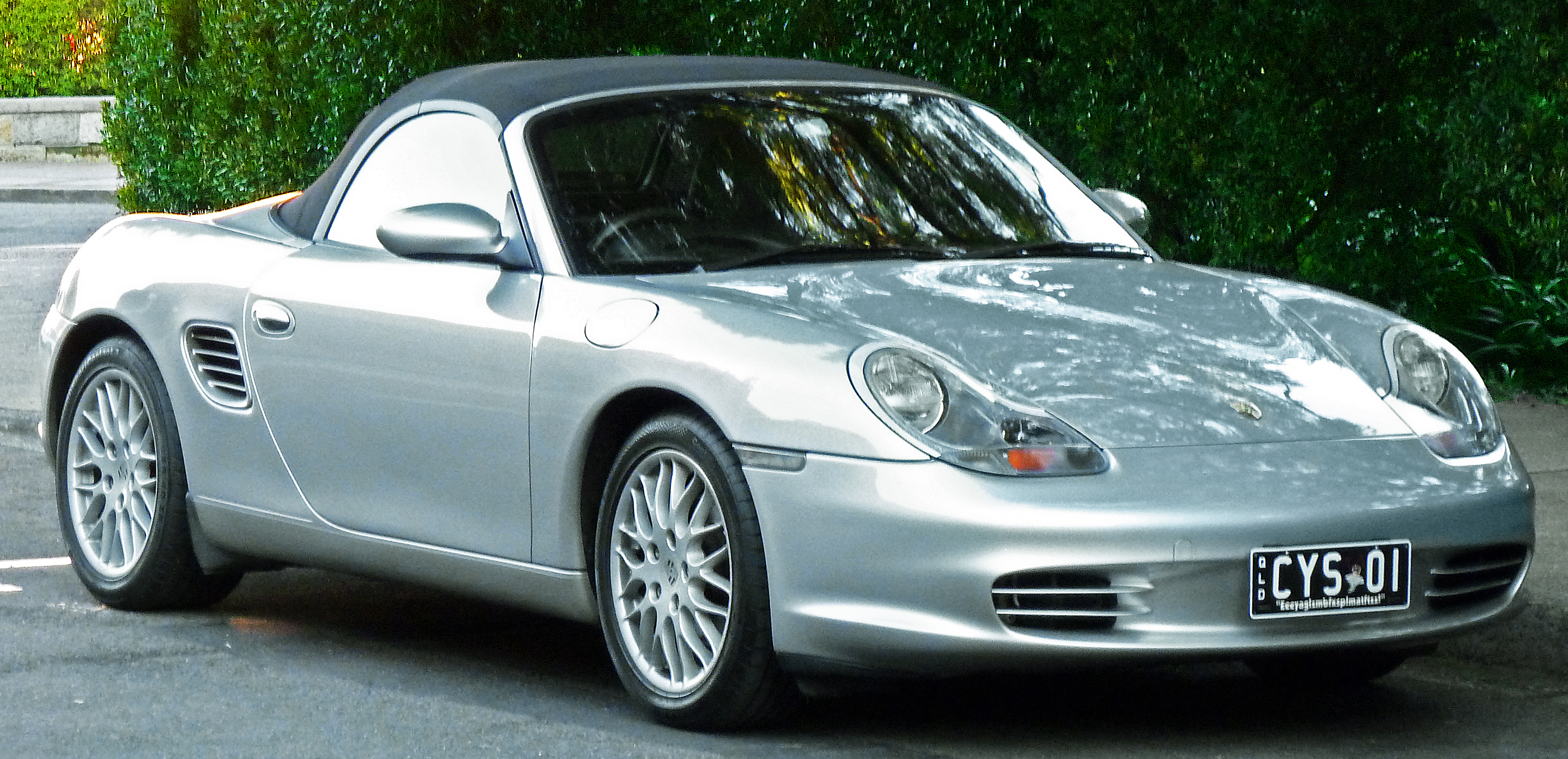
Porsche Boxster

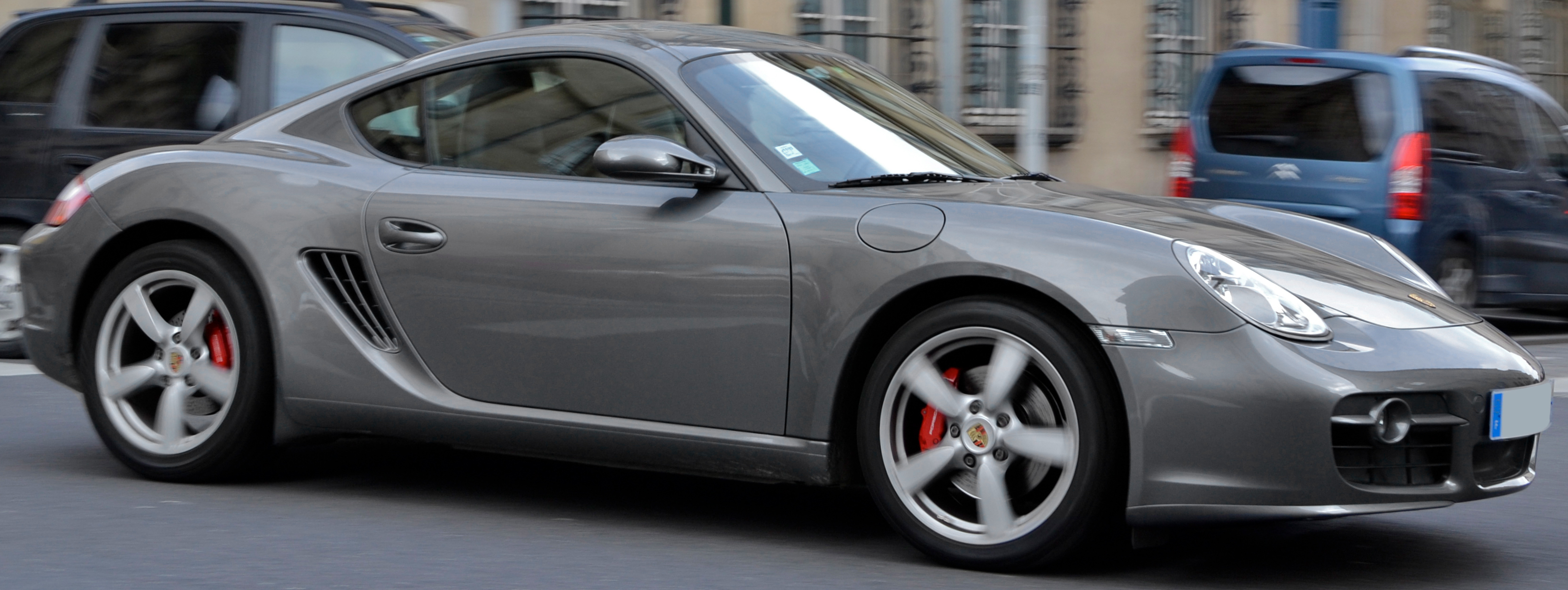
Porsche Cayman S

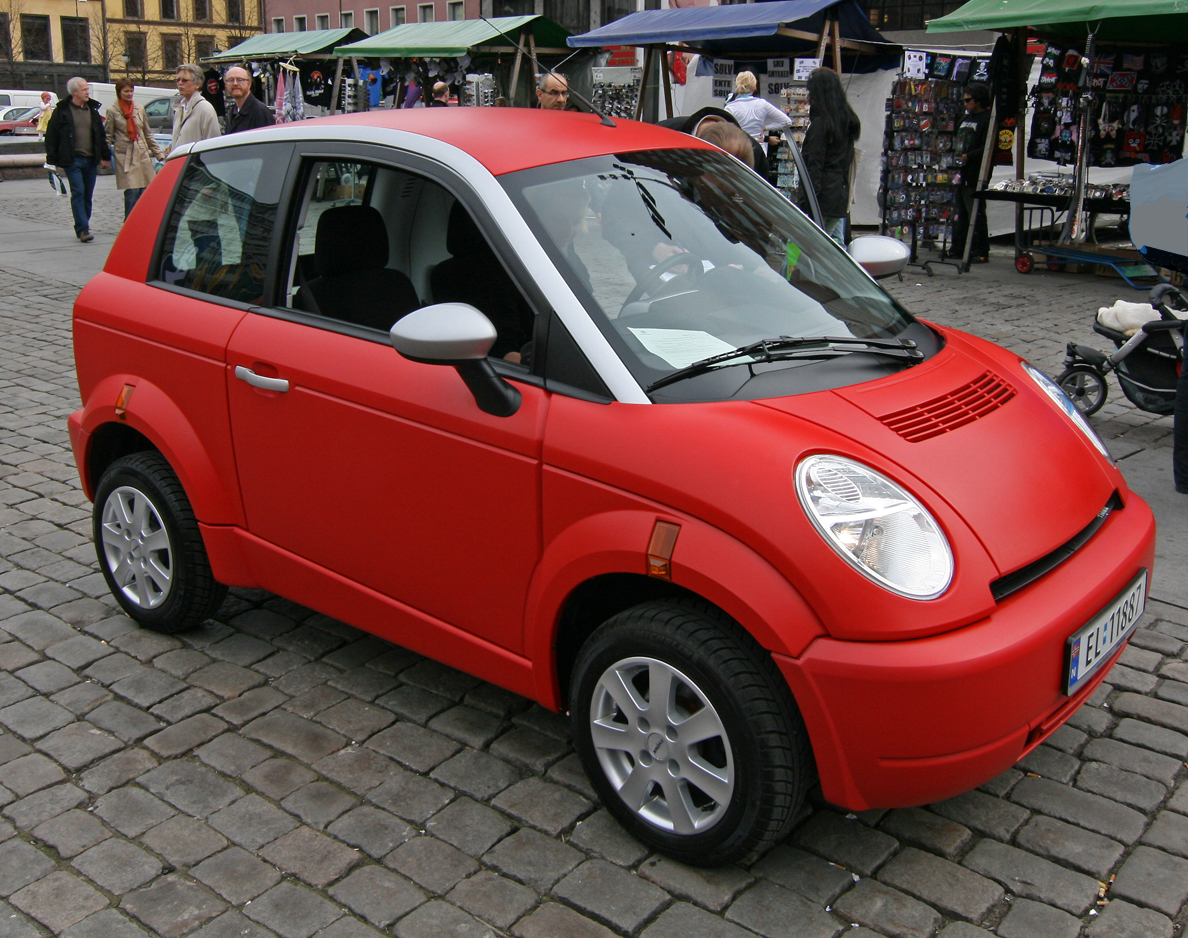
Th!nk City

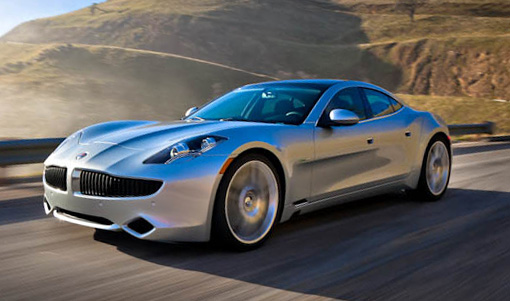
Fisker Karma

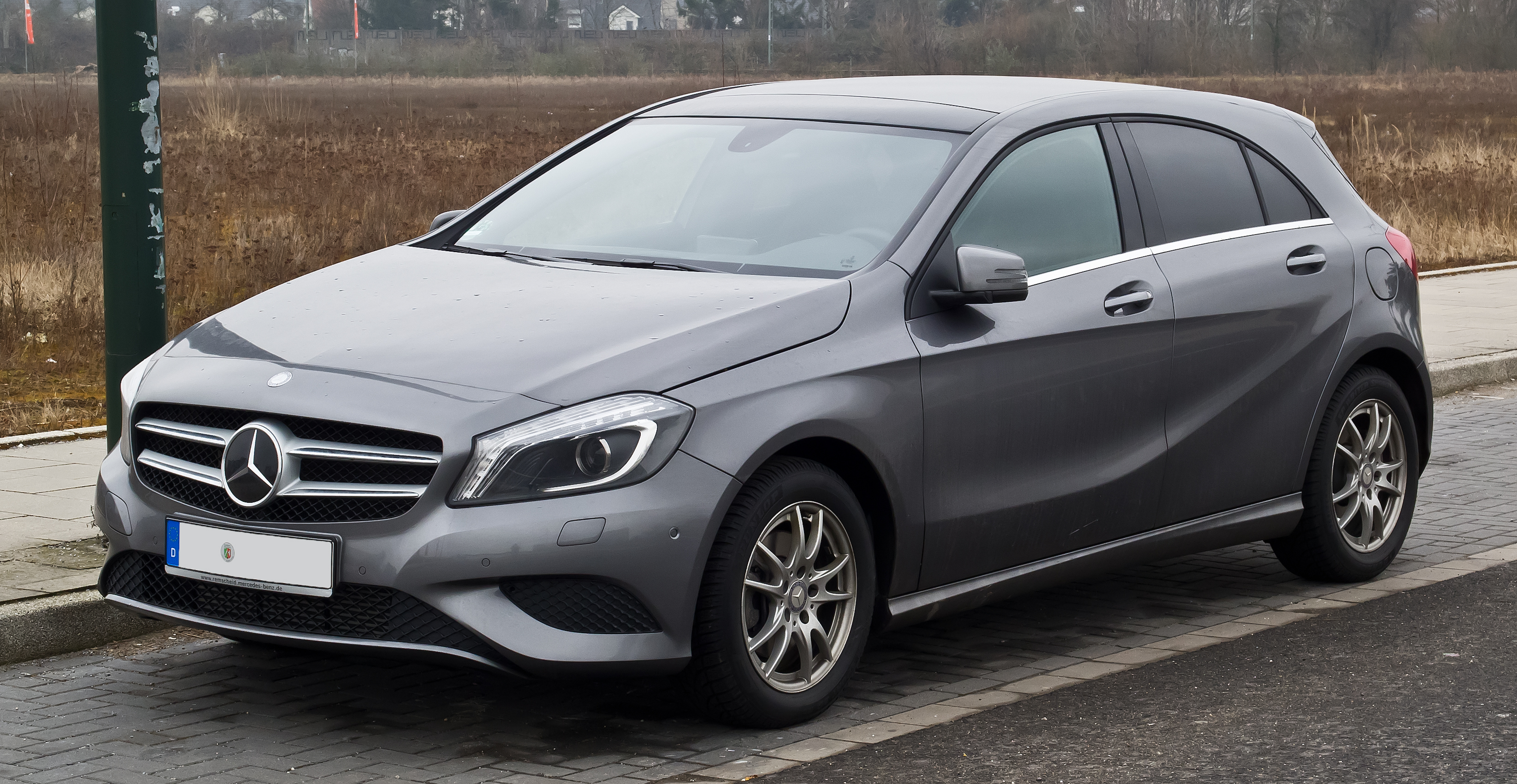
Mercedes-Benz A-class

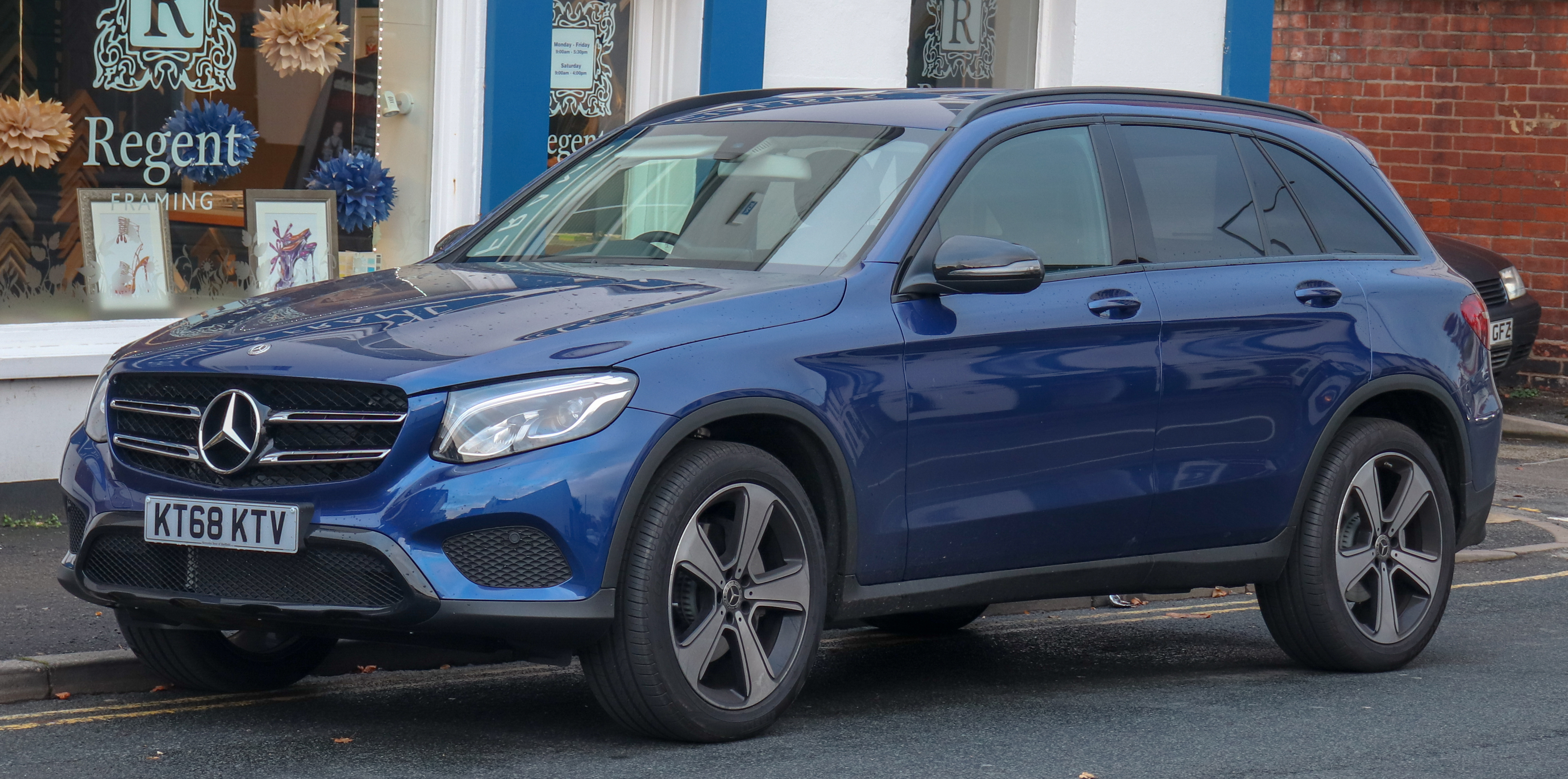
Mercedes-Benz GLC-class

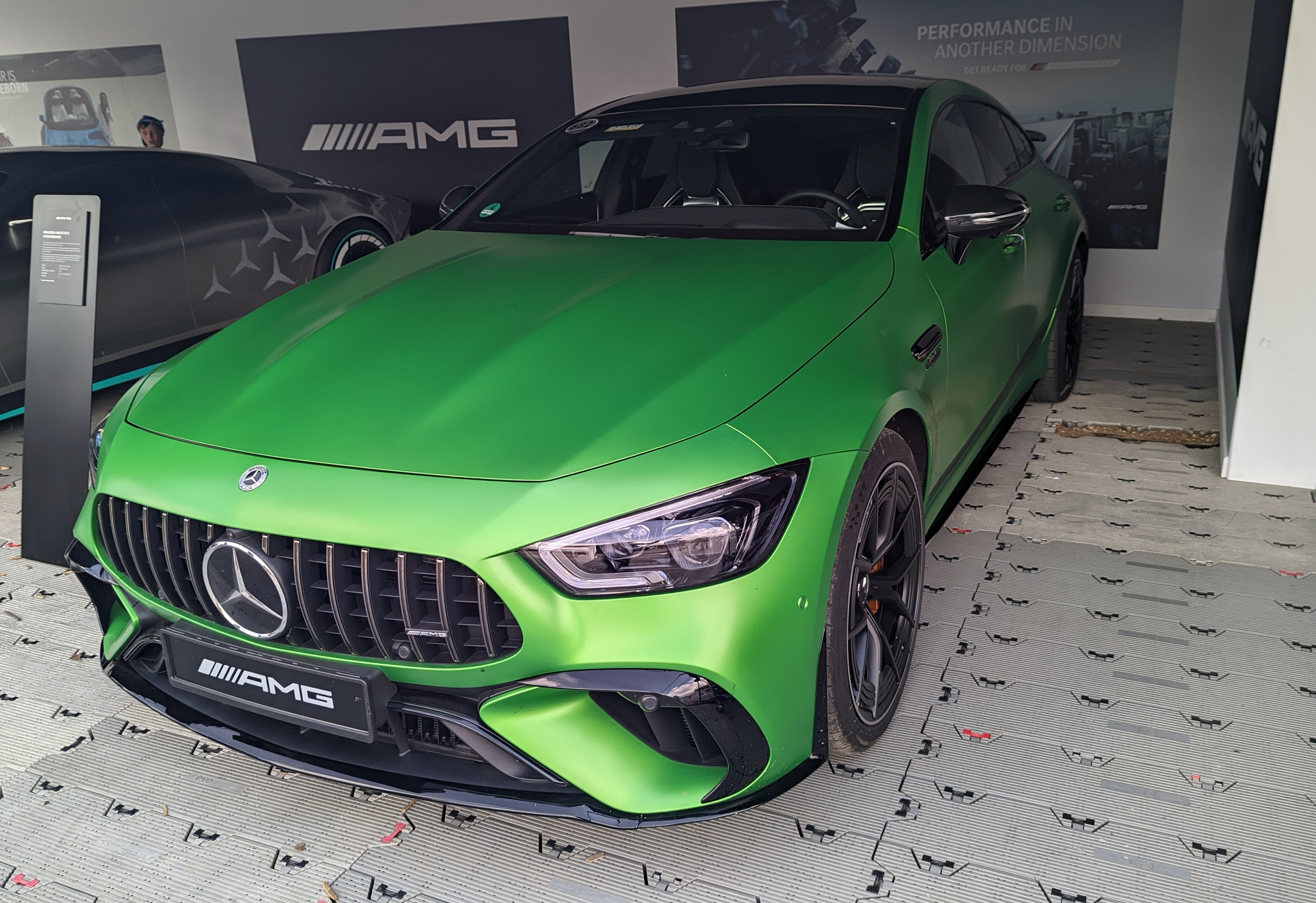
Mercedes-AMG GT 4 Door Coupe

== See also ==
- Uusikaupunki Automobile Museum
