= Sono Motors =

German company

Sono Motors GmbH
- Type: GmbH
- Traded as: Nasdaq: SEV
- ISIN: NL0015000N74
- Industry: Automotive
- Founded: Karben, 2016
- Founders: Laurin Hahn; Navina Pernsteiner; Jona Christians
- Headquarters: Munich, Germany
- Key people: Laurin Hahn, CEO
- Website: sonomotors.com

Sono Motors GmbH is a German company that developed electric solar car technology; the company went bankrupt in Q3 2026. It had developed the Sono Sion. A special feature of the vehicle designed by the company is solar cells embedded in the plastic body panels on both the roof and the sides. The electricity generated is fed into the traction battery and is said to be sufficient as an energy source for more than 5,000 kilometers per year. Sono Motors has been licensing this technology for use in buses and trucks since 2021. The company entered insolvency proceedings in 2023.

== History ==
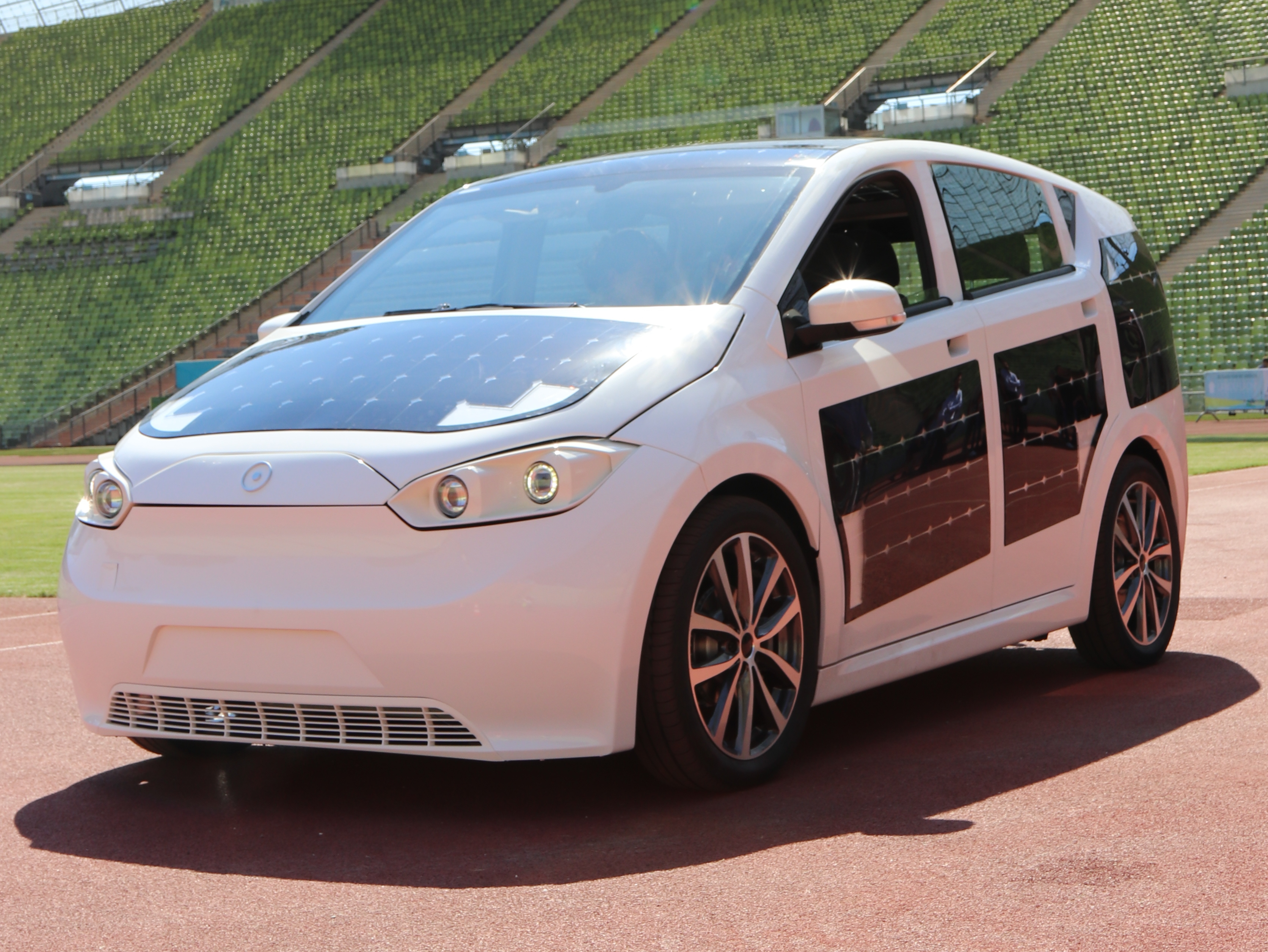
Prototype of the Sono Sion (2017)

=== Founding and first prototypes (2016–2018) ===
Sono Motors was founded by Laurin Hahn, Navina Pernsteiner and Jona Christians in Karben, Hesse, in January 2016. Still in its founding year, the company succeeded in securing funding for two functional prototypes by conducting two crowdfunding campaigns: €549.995 by 1.686 backers on the internet platform Indiegogo, and €1.8 million on Seedrs. Both prototypes were developed and built by Roding Automobile GmbH according to Sono's specifications, and were presented to the public in July 2017. During presentation tours through various European countries, interested parties were able to learn about the special features of the car and the mobility concept and take short test drives with the functional prototypes.

In October 2018, Sono Motors raised new equity and debt capital in another financing round on Seedr, surpassing €6 million. At that time, the start of production of the vehicle was announced as having slipped into the fourth quarter of 2019 due to manufacturing issues.

=== First series car design and pre-orders (2018–2019) ===
On November 8, 2018, the company was recorded to have 8,586 pre-orders for a car priced at €16,000 (excluding the cost of the battery) that was supposed to be launched in 29 countries during 2019.

In March 2019, the company finally presented the (later modified) series design of the Sion production car, and on April 17, 2019 announced its manufacturer. Sion would be produced by National Electric Vehicle Sweden (NEVS) at the Trollhättan site in Sweden, a former Saab production facility that was being reactivated there. Over an eight-year period (up until 2028), 260,000 Sono Motors vehicles were expected to roll off the production line.

According to Sono Motors, the company had 10,000 paid reservations for the Sion across Europe as of May 2019, and around 13,000 in January 2020.

=== Further funding rounds (2019–2021) ===
On December 1, 2019, the founders of Sono Motors stated that they had not been able to obtain the necessary funds through the "usual financing route". If they had accepted the terms of the potential investors, they would supposedly have had to abandon their own principles and lose the rights to their patents to the investors. The Sion would thus never have reached public roads in the way envisaged. Therefore, the founders returned to the original way of financing, crowdfunding.

Through new reservations with down payments of at least €500, increases in the down payment of orders already placed, donations and letters of intent to grant investment loans, Sono Motors aimed to raise €50 million by December 30, 2019. By the deadline set, only around €32.5 million had been non-bindingly pledged, after which the deadline was extended to January 20, 2020. €53.3 million in pledges were eventually reached.

=== Licensing, first threat of insolvency and IPO (2021) ===
By 2021, the company was threatened by insolvency despite the successful funding round just one year before and now also licensing its technology to manufacturers of buses and utility vehicles like ARI Motors, MAN and EasyMile.

In October 2021, Sono Motors filed for an initial public offering on the American technology exchange NASDAQ. On November 17, 2021, Sono Group N.V., the Dutch registered parent company of Sono Motors GmbH, went public on NASDAQ. Sono Motors was able to raise approximately US$135 million and avert the threat of insolvency. The stock price shortly increased to up to 155% of the initial price, but quickly dropped from US$25 to less than US$10 by the end of 2021.

=== First external prototypes and company growth (2021–2022) ===
Also in October 2021, ARI Motors presented the ARI 458, a small, light-weight utility vehicle equipped with five of Sono's solar panels providing up to 450 Watts. The solar cells are supposed to extend the range of the vehicle by up to 48 kilometers. At the beginning of 2022, the city of Munich was testing an electric bus with Sono's solar cells installed on a trailer under real-world conditions. The solar cells were supposed to provide the bus motors with constant power and thus reduce the number of charge-discharge cycles of the batteries, extending their lifetime.

In April 2022, Sono Motors cancelled the agreement with NEVS, the production partner for the Sion announced in 2019, and switched production to Valmet Automotive instead. Furthermore, the company now also decided to produce its first own vehicles in Finland rather than in Sweden. The price of the vehicle had also increased from the initial €16,000 to more than €26,000 between 2019 and 2021.

In May and June 2022, Sono sold an additional 10,930,000 ordinary shares, resulting in approximately $41.5 million in net proceeds, and entered into an agreement "[..] to sell and issue up to $150 million of its ordinary shares over a period of 24 months [..]" via Berenberg Bank.

In July 2022, the "production design" of the Sonos vehicle was unveiled at a large media event.

On September 8, 2022 the company published its Second Quarter 2022 report, citing strong growth, increasing Sion orders and a large number of business-to-business collaborations. There were supposedly more than 20,000 private customer reservations at a down payment of an average of €2,000, plus several larger orders by business partners, including a 12,600 car contract with Munich-based car rental company FINN. Sion was expected to sell at an "[..] expected net sales price point of just €25,126 [..]", possibly making it "[..] the world’s first solar electric vehicle (SEV) for the masses [..]".

On-street testing of the car had supposedly already begun, with mass production planned to start in the second half of 2023. Operation costs of €61.0 million in the first half of 2022 were confronted by a revenue of just €42,000 in the same half and cash and cash equivalents of €89.8 million as of 30 June 2022. Several large B2B projects (CHEREAU, Kögel, Wingliner, and Mitsubishi Heavy Industries Thermal Transport Europe), other solar projects and the launch of Sion were expected to generate revenue soon.

=== Production failure and #savesion (2022–) ===
On December 8, 2022 Sono Motors announced that it had again failed to collect enough money to complete production of the pre-ordered Sion vehicles, despite again reporting strong growth in the third quarter of 2022 and "21,000 Sion B2C reservations and 22,000 B2B pre-orders to date, reflecting potential net sales volumes of up to €1 billion" in its Third Quarter 2022 report released earlier on the same day. By the time of the announcements, the stock price had dropped by more than 94% of its initial value set in October 2021.

The company posed the question of how to continue with the company to its customers and fans, making its finances public and starting the #savesion campaign. Total funding was given at "until today approximately €264,000,000", with this sum including €50 million of "payment commitments". Operating expenditure was stated as "approximately €4,000,000 to €4,500,000 including internal development expenses" per month. Approximately €131 million had been spent on "capital expenditure (machinery and toolings) and external research & development costs".

It was not made clear if these sums included only the Sion project or also other technologies and services. The numbers stated in the documents were contrasted by graphics with different and conflicting information, with e.g. one graphic stating that "330 Mio.+ €" (sic) had already been financed up until the end of 2022, against the €264 million stated previously. At several points numbers with and without Value Added Tax (VAT) were mixed with each other.

The founders also stated they had been "on an extended U.S. tour to meet with potential investors, media and the community" experiencing "huge interest and high potential demand for our mission and technology", but decided not to enter the American market and raise additional funding there due to their inability to focus on completing the Sion project at the same time.

In the #savesion campaign, Sono asked for at least €50 million of additional money to "[..] achieve the next big milestone, the Pre-Series vehicles (SVC4) [..]", and posed this to the community in the form of a challenge to get 3,500 car pre-orders fully funded at a unit price of at least €26,900 each. Backers could either place new (fully funded) orders, increase their existing down payments or donate to the project. If the goal was not reached within 50 days, the Sion project would be cancelled. In that case, the company would continue to focus solely on its (also not profitable) solar business and other services.

The founders were also looking into additional financial instruments to raise money, e.g. subordinated loans. If the funding goal was reached, "Production Volume Ramp-Up" and delivery to initial backers would not be scheduled before the second quarter of 2024, five years after the initial 2019 target.

== Insolvency ==
The company entered insolvency proceedings in 2023.

== Technology ==
While the initial focus was solely on producing the Sion car, Sono later recognized the value of its custom-designed, light-weight, embeddable solar cells and other technology developed for the Sion car and began licensing it to other companies and added additional services. By 2021 it offered complete solutions including electronics, telematics and data services, mechanical and electrical integration and customer service and support, including solar retrofit kits for existing vehicles.

Sono Motors holds several patents, including a European patent for a bi-directional electric vehicle charging technology that is able to supply other vehicles and electric devices "with up to 11 kW of power" from the battery of a Sion vehicle.

== Vehicles ==
=== Sono Sion ===
The Sono Sion is the first vehicle to be developed by Sono Motors. It is an electric car that, in addition to charging via the power grid with Type 2 and CCS plugs, will also be charged by solar modules integrated into the body. This is expected to generate up to 34 kilometers of additional range per day. The Sono Sion was originally scheduled to go into production in 2019. In June 2021, the start of production was postponed until early 2023. However in February 2023, Sono Motors terminated the Sion program and announced it would focus exclusively on being a Solar Tech Company.
