= Sono Motors Sion =

Sion
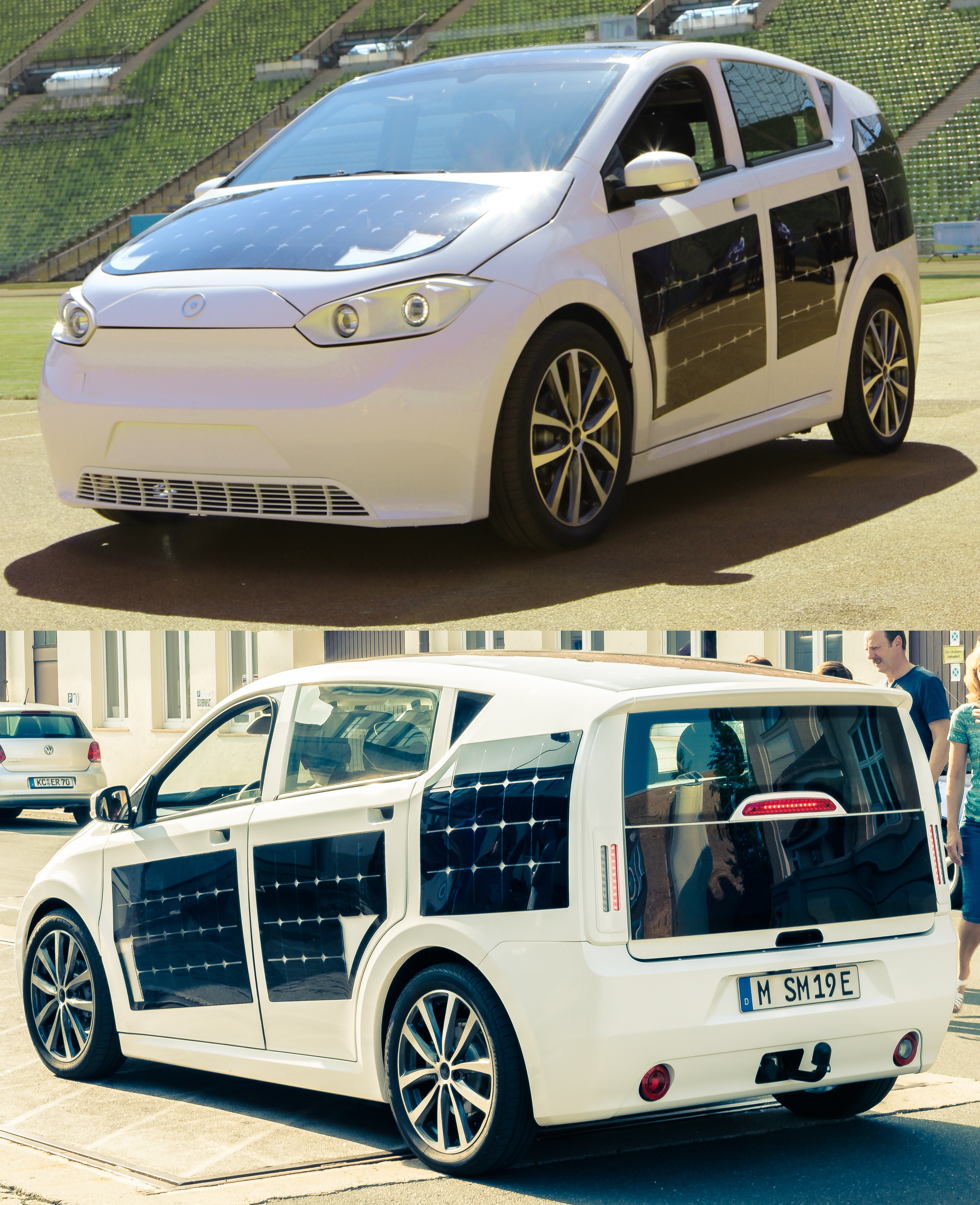
- Prototype of the white Sono Sion at a product presentation in the Munich Olympic Stadium

Overview
- Manufacturer: Sono Motors
- Production: projected 2023 start, later cancelled
- Assembly: Uusikaupunki, Finland (Valmet Automotive)

Body and chassis
- Class: Electric car (B)
- Body style: 5-door hatchback
- Layout: front-wheel-drive

Powertrain
- Electric motor: 120 kW (160 Hp)
- Transmission: Single gear
- Battery: 54 kWh LFP with Solar Energy
- Electric range: 250 km (160 mi)

Dimensions
- Length: 4.11 m (13 ft 6 in)
- Width: 1.79 m (5 ft 10 1/2 in)
- Height: 1.68 m (5 ft 6 in)
- Curb weight: 1,400 kg (3,086 lb)

Sion is a cancelled project by the German start-up Sono Motors aimed at developing a partially solar-powered electric car. The battery was set out to be chargeable using both the electric grid as well as its own solar cells.

== History ==
The founders of Sono Motors were working on the realization of the Sion since 2012. In 2016 and 2017, several crowdfunding campaigns raised more than €2 million in funding. In July 2016 computer graphics of the vehicle were presented.

Since August 2017, there were two functional prototypes built by Roding Automobile, whose form and function were planned to be largely similar to the end product. The experience gained during the test drives in 12 European cities (August 2017 to October 2017) was part of the further development. In autumn 2017, according to Sono, the series development began in cooperation with various partners. The Crashtest or Homologation took place in 2018, aiming for the 4* NCAP safety standard. In 2017, several medium-sized investors joined Sono Motors, including the founder of the German energy service provider Juwi and the Böllinger Group. The series production and delivery of the Sion was planned to start in the middle of 2019.

On May 9, 2018, Sono Motors announced the award of a major contract for the development and manufacture of a battery system for its solar vehicle to the German automotive supplier ElringKlinger. The total volume mounted to several hundred million euros over a term of eight years.

According to a press release from Sono Motors, on June 14, 2018, the minimum number of 5,000 reservations for Sion had been reached. On April 17, 2019, Sono Motors announced production would start by late 2020, using National Electric Vehicle Sweden (NEVS) at their Trollhättan, Sweden, site, formerly a SAAB car plant, but later delayed the production start target to 2022.

In late 2019, the company set a year-end fundraising goal of €50 million. It missed the goal, but extended the timeframe and hit the mark three weeks later, in January 2020.

As of 2021, the company was targeting a start of production in 2023.

On April 5, 2022, the company announced that Sion Solar vehicle would be manufactured by Finnish automotive manufacturer Valmet Automotive.

In December 2022, the CEOs and co-founders of Sono Motors announced that they were unable to raise enough money to finance Sion, and asked supporters to help continue the project.

In February 2023, the company announced it would cease developing the vehicle, citing a failure to crowdsource sufficient funds.

In early August 2025 the auctioning of the remaining Sion-programs assets, including 10 prototypes and tools, was announced. The online auction ended at 9 September 2025.

== Overview ==
=== Specifications ===
The Sion is a purely electrically driven car, which can be charged by a Type2- / CCS- charging interface, as well as by its own photovoltaic modules integrated into the car's outer skin.

=== Drive ===
The drive was designed as a three-phase asynchronous motor with a power of 120 kilowatts (161 hp). The motor voltage is 400 V. With the rear wheel drive, a top speed of 140 kilometres per hour (87 mph) should be possible.

=== Solar cells (viSono) ===
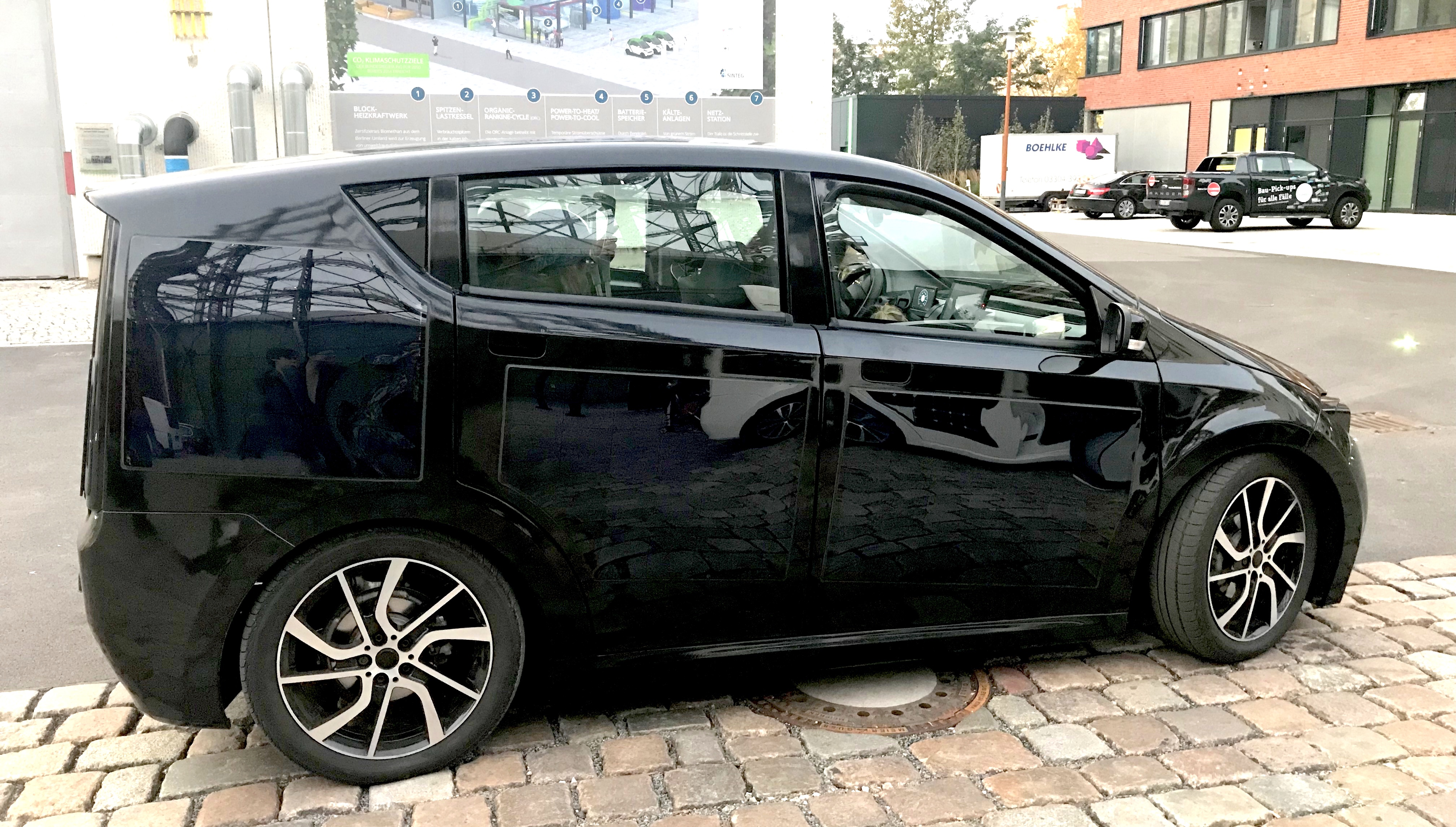
Side view of the black prototype in October 2017

The roof, bonnet and large parts of the outer shell of the body are equipped with highly efficient monocrystalline silicon cells (especially efficient in diffuse light, aiming to load 100% of their potential capacity at angles of incidence down to 70°) which are protected by a layer of polycarbonate. The startup uses the product name viSono. The total area of the 330 photovoltaic modules is 7.5 square metres (81 sq ft) with an announced efficiency of 21%. The maximum total power output is 1208 W_{p}, which means that the daily range gained in Central Europe is at a maximum of 34 kilometres (21 mi) a day under favorable conditions (sunshine) and on average over a whole year about 10 kilometres (6 mi) a day.

=== Features ===
Sono Motors pursued a one-product strategy, i.e. the car was expected to be produced only in one equipment variant.

The Sion has room for 5 passengers. The seats offer 45 centimetres (18 in) of shoulder freedom and are all foldable. The drivers' seat is adjustable in height and position. The outer color will be black. The luggage compartment has a standard capacity of 650 litres (23 cu ft) and can be increased to a total of 1,250 litres (44 cu ft) by turning over the rear seats. In the interior, a natural filter made of moss regulates the humidity and filters fine dust (breSono). Front and rear airbags can be deactivated, so that child seats can be used. The electric handbrake is integrated into the center console. A trailer coupling for trailers up to 750 kilograms (1,650 lb) will be available as an option.

The Sion was designed to be equipped with ABS, an alarm system, driver and passenger (deactivatable) airbags, side airbags with head and chest protection at the front as well as ESP with drive slip control. A reversing camera, cruise control and heated front seats were planned.

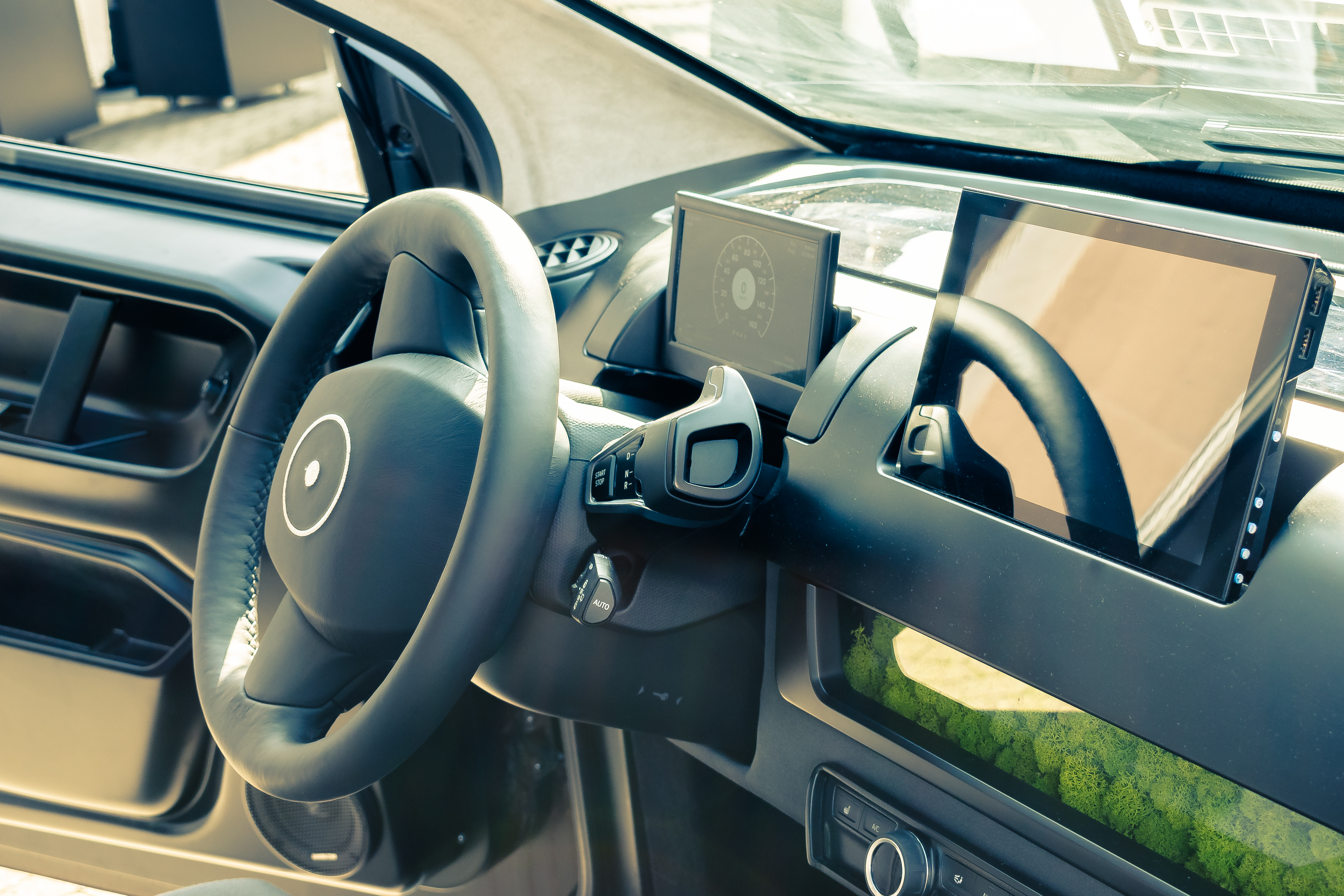
Interior of the prototype, August 2017

=== Current storage (biSono) ===
The bidirectional charging system will enable the charging of other electric vehicles (11 kW) via a further Type2 socket, as well as the charging of standard household appliances (2.7 kW / 230 V) at the Sion via a Schuko socket.

=== Criticism ===
In several electromobility forums, criticism was voiced, according to which the announcements of the start-up to the vehicle were unrealistically ambitious. In the prototype vehicles, individual observers recognized parts of the interior, chassis and drive of the BMW i3 with a concealed or removed BMW trademark. This questioned the creation height of the prototype and made the announcements appear doubtful.

On September 14, 2017, Sono Motors responded to this criticism in social networks and forums.

== Battery and range ==
A water-cooled Li-ion battery (LiMn_{2}O_{4}) with a capacity of 35-45 kWh and a weight of approx. 250 kilograms (550 lb) was to be used as the Sion's power storage. Because of the current rapid advances in battery technology, the final battery choice was deferred until later in the development process.

The Sion would have been delivered with a CCS connector system with an integrated Type 2 connector. The type 2 charging cable was expected to be available at an extra charge. The built-in charger is designed to charge the battery with 3.7 kW to 22 kW of power (AC) for Mode2 and Mode3 charging according to IEC 62196. For DC charging to CCS, 50 kW charging capacity is indicated.

The Sion was to have a range of 320 kilometres (200 mi) (NEFZ), which corresponds to approximately 250 km (160 mi) under realistic driving conditions.

In June 2021 the company announced a new, sustainable, battery, the Lithium-Iron-Phosphate Battery (LFP). Unlike lithium-ion equivalents, the battery's cell chemistry contains no cobalt, nickel or manganese. The LFP batteries are also effectively non-flammable. After long and intensive use, they displayed only low power losses, giving them a particularly long service life, as well as having a greater range.

== Flexible charging ==
According to Sion the charging can be performed on any charging station in Europe employing various charging methods such as SchuKo, Type 2, and CCS.

Using SchuKo in other words European Household Plug method, the empty car battery fully charges completely up to 100 percent up to 13 hours, based on the socket capacity.

The Sion vehicle using Type 2 Standard Charging Station method can be charged up to 80 percent in 2.5 hours and up to 100 percent in 3.2 hours.

The Rapid Charging Station (CCS) charge the battery up to 80 percent in half an hour. By charging an additional 30 minutes the battery charges up to 100 percent. 80 percent of charge allows a 200-kilometer range, which is enough according to distance between stations.

== Dimensions ==
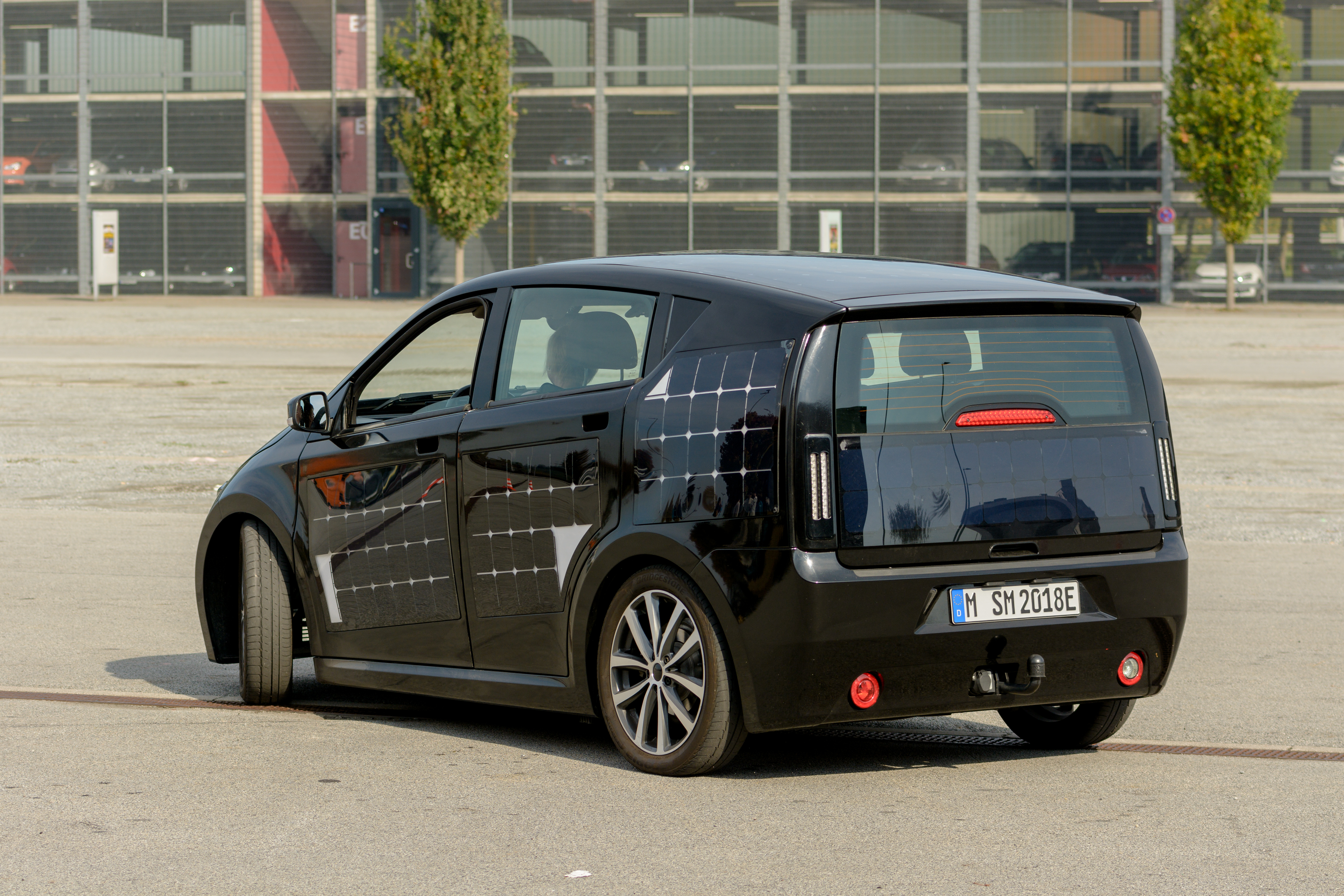
SION

Dimensions	in mm
Total Length	4290
Total Width	1830
With exterior mirrors	2100
Wheelbase	2770
Front track	1580
Rear track	1590
Height	1670
Trunk sill height unladen	780
Maximum trunk opening width	1100
Trunk opening height	700
Maximum loading length (tailgate to front seat)	1600
Loading length behind rear seats	800
Trunk volume in liters (non VDA standard)	650
With rear seats folded down	1250

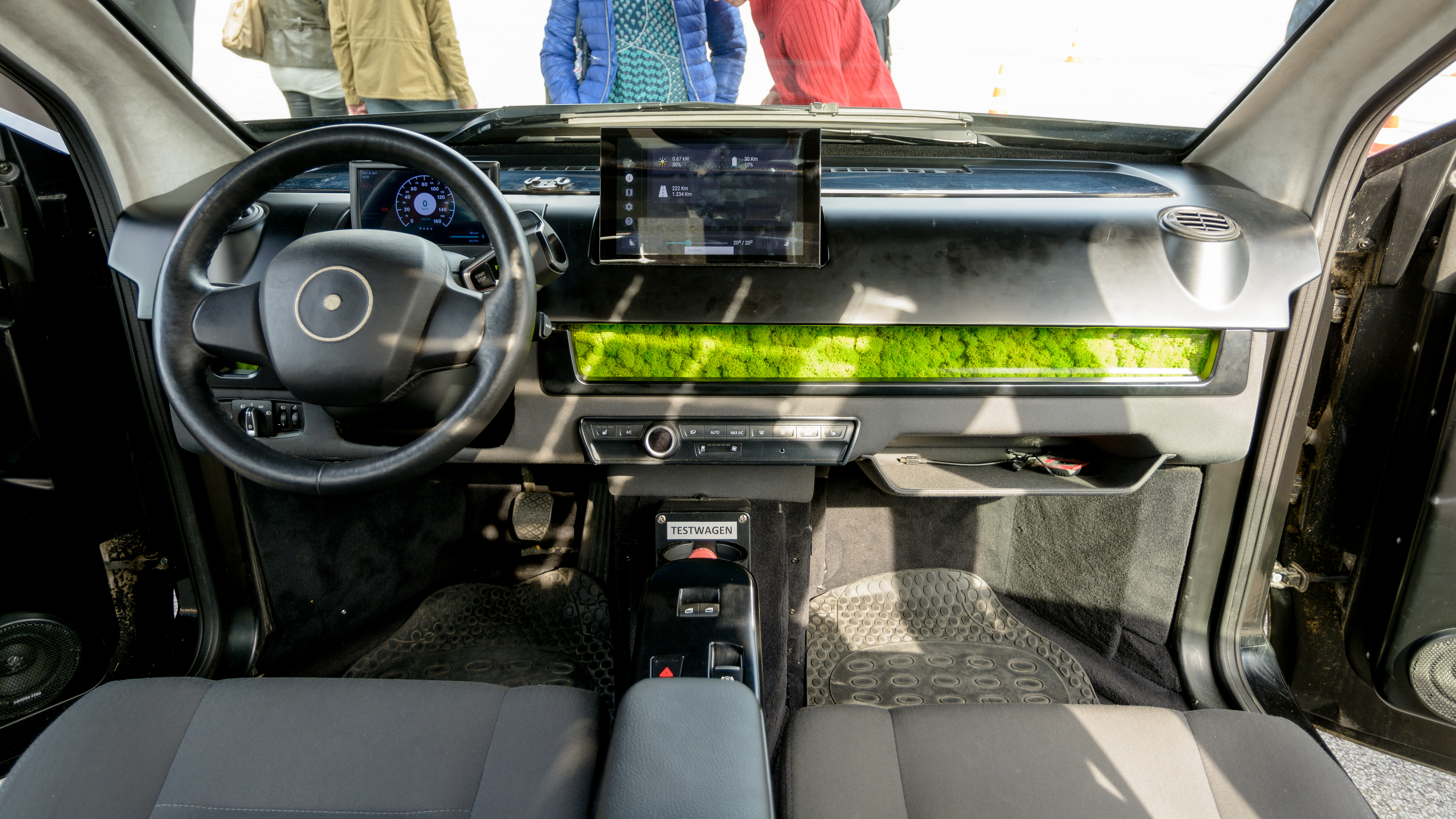
BreSono

== BreSono ==
One of the inventions of Sion motors is the artificial air filtration called BreSono. This uses moss placed in the dashboard and the center of console to augment the air filtration. According to Sono motors, moss can increase the indoor air quality by filtering up to 20 percent of air particulates. The BreSono does not require special care i.e. watering, fertilizing, trimming or exposing to sunlight due to avoided enzymatic reaction of moss. BreSono has sponge properties that controls humidity where it either extracts it from the air or adds it to the air, according to the air humidity. In dry air, the moss provides extra moisture and its consistency becomes less soft. This filter could be replaced during a filter change.

== Workshop ("reSono") ==
The workshop manual for the Sion, including CAD data of all spare parts for 3D printers or CNC Milling, will be publicly available (license-free) with the delivery of the first models so that future repair costs may be expected to be reasonable. With additional explanatory videos and a catalog of instructions on the site, it should be possible to install spare parts in the vehicle either independently of a workshop or by a workshop with limited experience of the Sion.

== Sharing ("goSono") ==
On request, the owner of the vehicle is able to use his / her mobile phone app to offer other people electric power (power-sharing), a ride-way (ridesharing) or to rent out his car (car-sharing).

== Business plans ==
=== The Netherlands ===
Sono Motors Founders intend to move part of their business toward the Netherlands, as there is a growing e-mobility market there. They plan to captivate and intrigue the public interest so as to launch their zero-emission vehicle for sale, holding tours in 18 cities of the Netherlands and Germany.

== Reservation and order ==
Currently, the vehicle can be reserved on the Sono Motors website for a deposit. A contract of sale for the Sion will be offered to these prospective customers in 2020. There is a two-week right of revocation and rescission. The delivery will take place free of charge only to Trollhättan (Sweden) in 2021, at an extra charge also to a desired place.

=== Prices ===
The Sion was projected to cost €16,000 in its standard configuration without a battery, or €25,500 for a complete car. On April 5, 2022, a price increase to €29,900 was announced. By the use of older – and thus no longer legally protected – components of traditional car manufacturers this lower price compared to many other electric cars is said to be possible. The drive train as well as the battery are provided by automotive suppliers.

The battery was going to be offered either at a monthly amount (rent or lease) or for purchase. The one-time purchase price of the battery was initially projected by Sono Motors to be less than €4,000, but was later increased to a realistic estimate of €9,500.

=== Production ===
The intended long-term production goal was 43,000 vehicles annually, gradually ramping up to 260,000 by 2028. In late 2019, with 10,000 units preordered, Sono predicted a September 2021 production start, with the preorder page showing customer deliveries targeted for early 2022.

Sono also planned to extend their vehicle models on the same platform, but they didn't publish any details yet on what those models might be, or what would be the co-producing companies. The aim is using 100% renewable energy to power that factory.

The car was planned to be manufactured by Valmet Automotive in Finland from the first half of 2023.

== Organizational chart ==
Founders
Jona Christians
Laurin Hahn
Navina Pernsteiner

Management Team
CEO	Laurin Hahn
CEO	Jona Christians
CFO	Torsten Kiedel
COO	Thomas Hausch
CTO	Markus Volmer

== Warranty ==
The legal provisions in Europe apply to the warranty. In addition, Sono Motors provides a guarantee for the Sion of either two years or 100,000 km (62,000 mi).
