= Carli (surname) =

Carli is a surname, and may refer to:

== People ==
- Adelir Antonio de Carli (1966–2008), Brazilian Catholic priest
- Antonio Francesco Carli (fl. 1706–23), Italian bass singer, primarily of operatic roles
- Arnaldo Carli (1901–1972), Italian racing cyclist and Olympic champion in track cycling
- Auguste Carli (1868–1930), French sculptor
- Bernardo Ribas Carli (1986–2018), Brazilian politician and member of the Brazilian Social Democracy Party
- Carlo Carli (Australian politician) (born 1960), Labor Party member of the Victorian Legislative Assembly from 1994 to 2010
- Carlo Carli (Italian politician) (born 1945), long-time member of the Italian Socialist Party
- Carla Carli Mazzucato (born 1935), Italian artist
- Dena M. Carli, former Democratic member of the Illinois House of Representatives
- Didi Carli (born 1943), Argentine ballet dancer
- Diletta Carli (born 1996), Italian swimmer
- Dionigi da Palacenza Carli, Italian missionary in Africa
- Filippo Carli (1876–1938), Italian fascist sociologist
- Ph. G. "Flip" Carli (1879–1972), Indonesian footballer turned film director
- François Carli (1872–1957), French sculptor
- Giampiero de Carli (born 1970), former Italian rugby union player and current coach
- Gian Rinaldo Carli (1720–1795), Italian economist, historian, and antiquarian
- Guido Carli (1914–1993), Italian banker, economist and politician
- Joel Carli (born 1986), Argentine footballer
- Laura Carli (1906–2005), Italian actress and dubber
- Marco di Carli (born 1985), German swimmer
- Mario Carli (1888–1935), Italian poet, novelist, essayist, diplomat, and journalist
- Patricia Carli (born 1938), Italian-French singer
- Robert Carli (born 1970), Canadian film and television composer and saxophonist

== See also ==
- Carli (disambiguation)
- Carli (given name)
- Cari (name)
- Carle, surnames
- Carle (given name)
- Carlie
- Carlo (name)
