= Carli =

Carli may refer to:

- Carli (given name), a list of people
- Carli (surname), a list of people
- Çarlı, Azerbaijan, a village and municipality
- Carli Bay, Bay in Trinidad
- Carli Mansion, mansion in Slovenia
- Carli Palace of Verona, palace in Italy
- Čarli TV, TV station in Slovenia
- Hoplocorypha carli, Praying Mantis species native to Rwanda

== See also ==
- Dionigi da Palacenza Carli
- Consortium of Academic and Research Libraries in Illinois (CARLI)
