= Gravisi–Buttorai Mansion =

- Slovene: palača Gravisi-Buttorai; Italian: palazzo Gravisi-Buttorai
- Location within Slovenia

General information
- Architectural style: Baroque
- Location: Koper, Slovenia
- Coordinates: 45°32′48.37″N 13°43′47.72″E
- Opened: 1664

Design and construction
- Designations: Protected monument

Gravisi–Buttorai Mansion (Slovene: palača Gravisi-Buttorai; Italian: palazzo Gravisi-Buttorai) is a mansion in Koper, a port town in southwestern Slovenia. It is a protected monument of local significance. The mansion is situated at Shoemaker's Street (Slovene: Čevljarska ulica, Italian: Calegaria) in the old town center. It was the seat of a branch of the Gravisi family, whose senior line had the title of Marquis of Pietrapelosa, first granted to Nicolò Gravisi in 1440.

== Location ==
The mansion is one of a number of interesting buildings in the old town center, others being Almerigogna Mansion, Carli Mansion and Belgramoni–Tacco Mansion, which is home of the regional museum. It is a Renaissance mansion built in 1664, lies on a narrow street on a site about 18 metres (59 ft) by 15 metres (49 ft). The front of the mansion faces Osvobodilne (Liberation) street (Italian: via Fronte di Liberazione), formerly known as via degli Orti grandi. This street, and the mansion, lay on the edge of the central part of Koper's Poličastega island. Judging from Gothic finds, the area was extremely important during earlier periods of history.

== Building ==
The mansion is one of the finest examples of Baroque architecture in Koper. It has two stories above the ground floor. The ground floor windows are relatively small. The first floor windows are considerably larger and are decorated with lunettes or tympana, with balustraded balconies. The mansion has a fine main portal, above which is the main balcony. The noble family's coat of arms is above the door of the main portal, which is flanked by triple lancet windows. The smaller portal to the left, which leads to the garden, is inscribed with the date 1664. The right wing of the mansion was never completed. The renovated building has a floor area of 731 square metres (7,870 sq ft) as well as an extensive garden.

The foundations lie on an artificial embankment of sand, gravel and loam capped with clay, about 5 metres (16 ft) deep, which rests on load-bearing sandstone. Groundwater migration has eroded this embankment and caused subsidence and cracks to open in the structure. Recent deep excavations for municipal facilities caused pronounced settling in one corner, threatening the integrity of the building. In 2010 the foundations were stabilized through injecting a polymer-based mixture of latex and cellulose.

== Usage ==
The oldest records of the mansion come from 1878, with a reference to Caterina De Gravisi, widow of Giuseppe Gravisi, as its owner. The renovated building today is the headquarters of the autonomous Italian national community of Koper. Other tenants are the Santorio Santorio thermal spa, ASCI sports club and the Society for Historical Research. The Insula-Obala Visual Artists Association, which runs the Insula Gallery in neighboring Izola, sometimes prepares exhibitions in the mansion.
