= Carla =

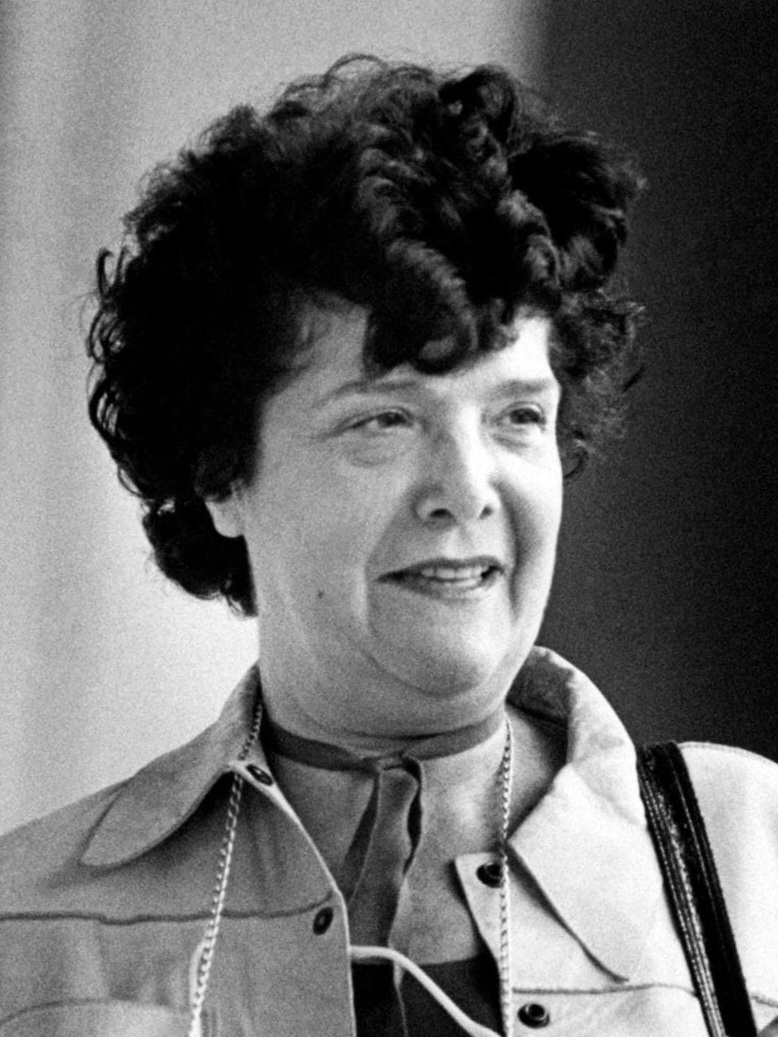
Carla Voltolina Pertini, Italian journalist and Companion of the president of the Italian Republic

Carla is the feminized version of Carl, Carlos or Charles, from ceorl in Old English, which means "free man".

== People ==
=== Stage name ===
Carla is a stage name notably used by:

- Carla Georges (born 2003), French singer, former member of the children's music group Kids United
- Carla Lazzari (born 2005), French singer, French representative at the 2019 Junior Eurovision

=== Other ===
Other notable people with the name include:

- Carla Abellana (born 1986), Filipina actress and commercial model
- Carla Angola, Venezuelan journalist and television presenter
- Carla Azar, drummer and singer for the band Autolux
- Carla Baratta, (born 1990), Venezuelan actress, model, and artist.
- Carla Barbarella, (born 1940), Italian politician
- Carla Barbarino (born 1967), retired Italian sprinter and hurdler
- Carla Beck, Canadian politician
- Carla Berrocal (born 1983), Spanish comics illustrator
- Carla Berube (born 1975), American college basketball coach
- Carla Beurskens (born 1952), prominent long-distance runner from the Netherlands
- Carla Blank, American choreographer, writer, and editor
- Carla Bley (1936–2023), American jazz composer, pianist, organist and bandleader
- Carla Bonner (born 1973), Australian actress
- Carla Borrego (born 1983), Jamaican basketball and netball player
- Carla Boyce (born 1998), Scottish footballer
- Carla Boyd (born 1975), retired Australian basketball player with 2 Olympic medals
- Carla Bozulich (born 1965), lead singer, lyricist and founder of The Geraldine Fibbers
- Carla Bruni (born 1967), Italian-French singer, songwriter and former model
- Carla Cassidy, American romance novelist
- Carla Koplin Cohn, American secretary, personal assistant to Hank Aaron, Baseball Hall of Fame player.
- Carla Cook, jazz vocalist
- Carla Cortijo (born 1987), Puerto Rican basketball player
- Carla Cotwright-Williams (born 1973), African-American mathematician
- Carla Couto (born 1974), Portuguese football striker
- Carla Cunningham (born 1963), American politician
- Carla Del Poggio (1925–2010), Italian cinema, theatre, and television actress
- Carla Del Ponte (born 1947), Chief Prosecutor at two United Nations international criminal law tribunals
- Carla Dunlap (born 1954), American bodybuilding champion.
- Carla Dziwoki (born 1982), Australian netball player
- Carla J. Easton, Scottish singer-songwriter
- Carla Emery DeLong (1939–2005), American author
- Carla Estrada (born 1956), Latin American telenovela producer
- Carla Fracci (1936–2021), ballet dancer and actress
- Carla Gallardo (born 1999), Spanish long-distance runner
- Carla Garapedian (born 1961), documentary filmmaker
- Carla Gavazzi (1913–2008), Italian operatic soprano
- Carla Geurts (born 1971), freestyle swimmer
- Carla Giuliano (born 1983), Italian politician
- Carla Gravina (born 1941), Italian film actress
- Carla Guevara Laforteza (born 1975), Filipino musical theater actress
- Carla Gugino (born 1971), American actress
- Carla Hall (born 1964), American chef
- Carla Harryman (born 1952), American poet, essayist, and playwright
- Carla Anderson Hills (born 1934), American lawyer
- Carla Howell, President of the Center For Small Government
- Carla Humphries (born 1988), commercial model and actress in the Philippines
- Carla Jimenez (born 1974), American television and film actress
- Carla de Jonge (1886–1972), Dutch art historian and museum director
- Carla Kelly, American romance writer
- Carla Khan (born 1981), Pakistan squash player
- Carla Kihlstedt, American violinist, vocalist, and multi-instrumentalist
- Carla Körbes, Brazilian ballet dancer
- Carla Laemmle (1909–2014), American actress
- Carla Lane (1928–2016), pseudonym of Romana Barrack, an English television writer
- Carla Lehmann (1917–1990), Canadian film and television actress
- Carla Lockhart (born 1985), British politician
- Carla MacLeod (born 1982), retired Canadian national women's hockey player
- Carla Marins (born 1968), Brazilian actress
- Carla Marlier (born 1938), French actress and model
- Carla Martinez (born 1956), Filipino actress and singer
- Carla McGhee (born 1968), American basketball player
- Carla Speed McNeil (born 1969), American science fiction writer, cartoonist, and illustrator
- Carla Mendonça (born 1964), English actress
- Carla Molema (born 1988), Dutch darts player
- Carla Moreno (born 1976), Brazilian triathlete
- Carla Morrison (born 1986), Mexican singer, songwriter and guitarist
- Carla Nunes, Brazilian footballer
- Carla Overbeck (born 1968), American soccer player
- Carla Padilla (born 1988), Bolivian footballer
- Carla Padilla Ramos (born 1969), Mexican politician
- Carla Qualtrough (born 1971), Canadian politician and former paralympian
- Carla Quevedo (born 1988), Argentinian actress and designer
- Carla Quint (born 1972), Dutch water polo player
- Carla Rebecchi (born 1984), Olympic bronze medalist in field hockey
- Carla Rhodes (born 1982), American ventriloquist, comedian and musician
- Carla Rueda Cotito (born 1990), Peruvian volleyball player
- Carla Ruocco (born 1973), Italian politician
- Carla Ryan (born 1985), professional cyclist from Australia
- Carla Sacramento (born 1971), middle distance runner from Portugal
- Carla J. Shatz, American neurobiologist
- Carla Shibley, Canadian para-cyclist
- Carla Maria da Silva, Brazilian footballer
- Carla Sinopoli, American anthropologist
- Carla Sozzani, Italian art dealer
- Carla Stovall (born 1957), politician and former Attorney General of Kansas
- Carla Suárez Navarro (born 1988), Spanish tennis player
- Carla Swart (1987–2011), South African cyclist
- Carla Thomas (born 1942), Queen of Memphis Soul
- Carla Tuzzi (born 1967), retired Italian hurdler
- Carla Ulbrich, American singer-songwriter, guitarist, and author
- Carla Van Zon, New Zealand artistic director
- Carla Werner, singer and songwriter from New Zealand
- Carla White (1951–2007), American jazz vocalist
- Carla Witte (1889–1943), German-Uruguayan painter, sculptor, and teacher
- Carla Woodcock (born 1998), English actress
- Carla Yules (born 1996), Indonesian beauty queen
- Carla Zampatti (1938–2021), fashion designer and businesswoman

== Fictional characters ==
- Carla Connor, character from the British soap opera, Coronation Street
- Carla Crozier, character on the New Zealand soap opera Shortland Street
- Carla Espinosa, character from Scrubs
- Carla Gray, character on One Life to Live
- Carla Mitchell, character from the British soap opera, EastEnders
- Carla Tortelli, waitress on the TV show Cheers
- Carla von Lahnstein, character from the German soap opera Verbotene Liebe (Forbidden Love)

== Other ==
- Hurricane Carla, Category 4 Atlantic hurricane in 1961

== See also ==
- Calla (name)
- Carli (given name)
- Carly (name)
- Charla (name)
- Karla (name)
- Carlia S. Westcott
