= Gravisi–Barbabianca Mansion =

- Slovene: palača Gravisi-Barbabianca; Italian: palazzo Gravisi-Barbabianca
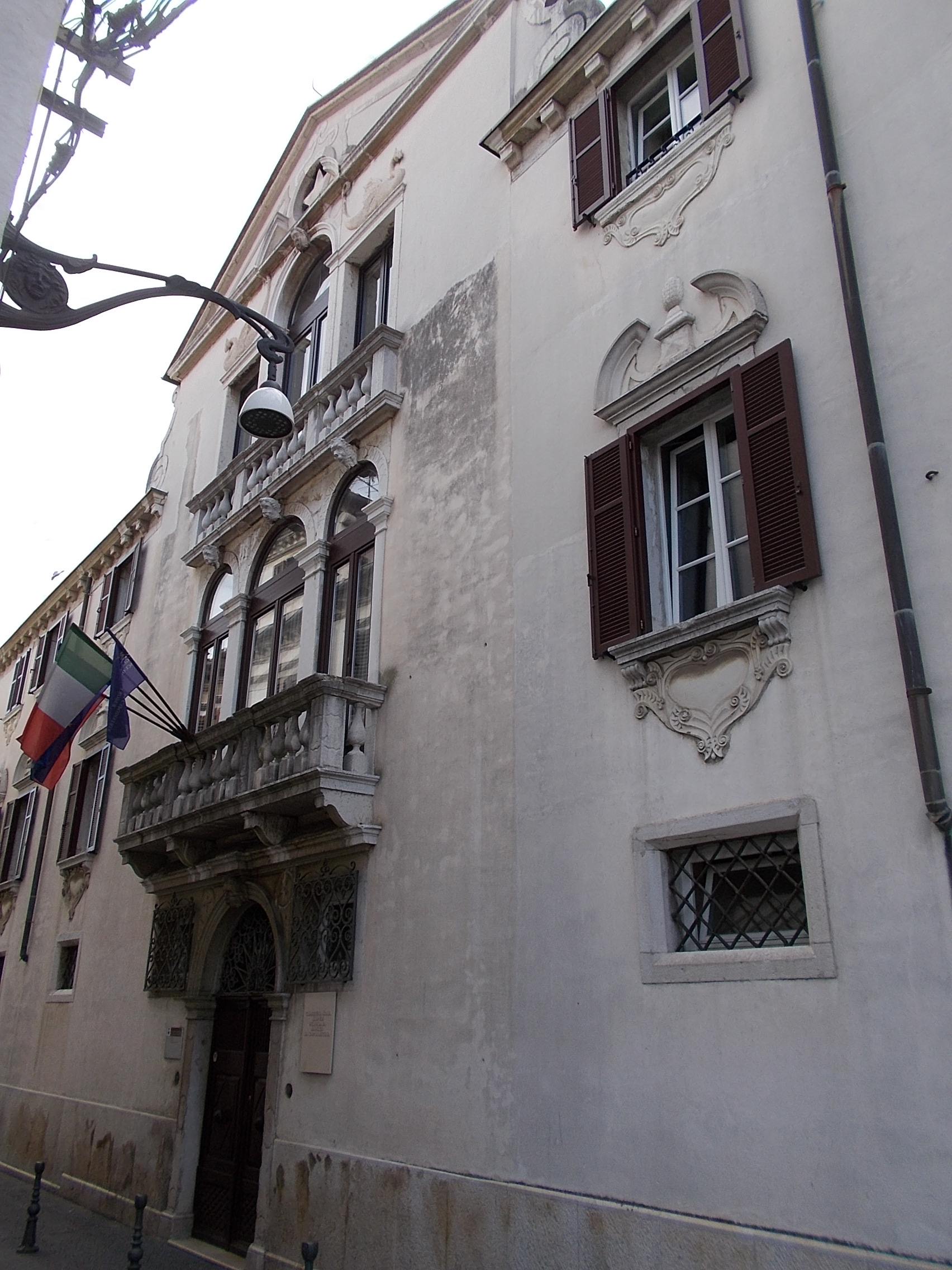
- Gravisi–Barbabianca Mansion

- Location within Slovenia

General information
- Architectural style: Baroque
- Location: Koper, Slovenia
- Coordinates: 45°32′50.23″N 13°43′52.16″E
- Renovated: 1710

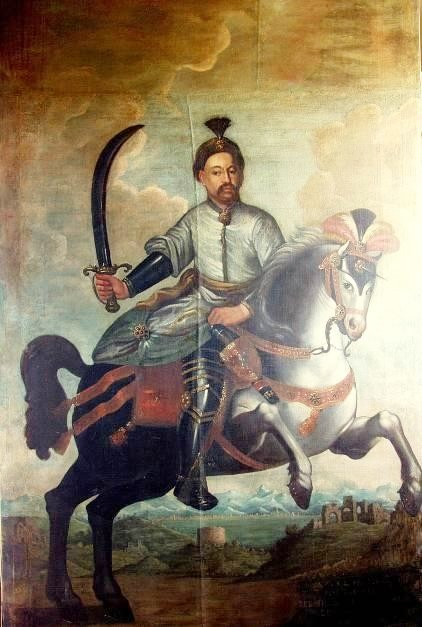
Equestrian portrait of the Polish King John III Sobieski

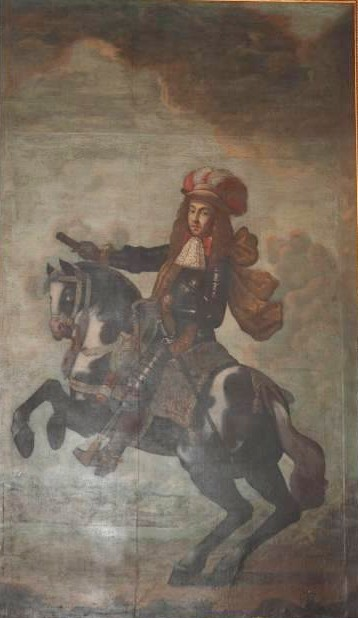
Equestrian portrait of Charles V, Duke of Lorraine

Gravisi–Barbabianca Mansion (Slovene: palača Gravisi-Barbabianca; Italian: palazzo Gravisi-Barbabianca) is a Baroque mansion in Koper (Italian: Capodistria), a port town in southwestern Slovenia. It was built in 1710. It was the family seat of the Gravisi family, who held the title of the Marquis of Pietrapelosa. Today it is the home of a music school.

== Location ==
The mansion is packed in among other houses in a densely built area of the old town but the Baroque facade is visible at the end of a blind alley, a typical arrangement for the period. Its facade fronts on the narrow Gallusova Street, with the north end jutting into the south of the roughly triangular Brolo square, once the center of medieval Koper. The square contains a large cistern fed by rainwater that supplies two stone fountains from the 15th century. Other buildings around the square are the Fontico (1392), formerly the city granary, the 14th century St. James's Church, Vissich–Nardi Mansion, Bishop's Mansion (Škofijska palača) and Brutti Mansion. After World War II the square was converted into a park. Since 2010 the square has been the venue for the Baladoor Jazz Festival.

== Facade ==
The Gravisi-Barbabianca is one of the most significant of Koper's Baroque buildings, obtaining its present form after major renovations in 1710. It illustrates a stage in the evolution of the mansions of the town from Romanticism to 19th century architecture. The mansion is a three-story building with a symmetrical facade. The windows on the ground floor are relatively small and high. On the floor above they are larger and more ornate, and on the floor above that they are less decorated.

The central axis of the facade rises one floor higher than the two wings, capped by a tympanum supported by volutes. The main ground floor entrance in the center section is a carved stone portal that opens into a spacious atrium, which in turn opens onto the garden. There is a richly decorated balcony above the portal, with triple arch lancet windows. A more modest version of the balcony and the triple arched windows is repeated on the next floor. Above these, the facade is decorated with carved dragons over the two side windows and a representation of the family crest on the tympanum over the taller central window.

== Interior ==
Over the centuries many works of art were collected in the mansion. The ceremonial hall was painted in the mid-nineteenth century by Giuseppe Lorenzo Gatteri, a fresco painter from Trieste. The fresco on the ceiling depicts Apollo on a chariot. Before World War II there was an important collection of work by the Venetian masters. The hall is reached by a richly stuccoed staircase from the left of the atrium. Three statues on the balustrade of the stairway represented sculpture, painting and architecture. One of these has been lost. Until 1967 there were four large equestrian portraits on the walls of this stairway: the Polish King John III Sobieski, Charles V, Duke of Lorraine the Austrian Emperor Leopold I and Prince Eugene of Savoy. The staircase today is hung with pictures of prominent members of the Gravisi family.

== Occupants ==
The Gravisi family of Koper (Capodistria) has held the title of Marquis of Pietrapelosa since 1440, when Nicolò Gravisi was given the title and the estate of Pietrapelosa as a reward for services rendered to the Republic of Venice. The palace site was originally occupied by a modest house of the Tacco family. According to an inscription on the first floor triple lancet windows, the house was incorporated in the south wing of the mansion in 1710 in a renovation initiated by Giovanni Nicolò Gravisi. The Marquis Girolamo Gravisi married Countess Chiara Barbabianco on 12 September 1745. She brought a rich dowry, and from then the family assumed the surname of Gravisi-Barbabianca. With the upheavals of World War I (1914-1918) and World War II (1939-1945) followed by incorporation of Istria into the Republic of Yugoslavia under Josip Broz Tito the family lost possession of the mansion.

For a while the building was used as a tax office, and is therefore sometimes called "“the cameral". The mansion today is used as a school of music. Concerts are held in the main hall, attracting lovers of both music and fine art. The Koper Music School (Glasbena šola Koper) was established in Portorož in 1948, moved to Koper in 1951 and moved into the Gravisi Barbabianca in 1955. In 1984 the building had a major restoration. In 2003 the Centre for Music Education, Koper was renamed Koper Music School, incorporating three coastal music schools of Izola, Koper and Piran. The concert hall is too small and the building does not have enough space, so the music school has been forced to hold classes in various other locations in Koper.

On 25 November 2010 a ceremony was held in the concert hall to mark the 300th anniversary of the building. The Slovenian Minister of Education, Dr. Igor Luksic, was the keynote speaker. The historian Salvator Žitko attended the ceremony. He presented three of four major equestrian portraits that had been removed from the mansion in 1968 for restoration and were now finally being returned to their original site. Two of the portraits were briefly hung in their original locations, but were then returned to the Praetorian Palace and Koper Regional Museum. The other two are still waiting for restoration work.
