= Carle (given name) =

Carle is given name that is a variant of Carla. Notable people with this name include the following:

== Given name ==
- Carle Bernier-Genest (fl. 2006 – 2009), a Canadian politician
- Carle Brenneman (born 1989), Canadian snowboarder
- Carle Hessay, birthname Hans Karl Hesse (1911–1978), German-born Canadian painter
- Carle Pace (1918–2008), South African cyclist, track sprinter and endurance athlete
- Carle M. Pieters (born 1943), American planetary scientist
- Carle van Loo, alternate name of Charles-André van Loo (1705–1765), French painter
- Carle Vernet, nickname of Antoine Charles Horace Vernet (1758–1836), French painter
- Carle Augustus Woodruff (1841–1913), American soldier
- Carle C. Zimmerman (1897–1983), American sociologist

== Middle name ==
- Thornton Carle Fry (1892–1991), applied mathematician

== See also ==
- Cable (surname)
- Caple
- Carl (name)
- Carley (name)
- Carle, surnames
- Carle (disambiguation)
- Carlee
- Carlen (surname)
- Carles (name)
- Carley (name)
- Carli (given name)
- Carli (surname)
- Carlie
- Carlo (name)
- Carlye J. Hughes
- Carme (given name)
- Carré (surname)
- Carse (surname)
- Charle (name)
- De Carle
