= Carli (given name) =

Carli is a nickname and given name. Notable people referred to by this name include the following:

== Given name ==
- Carli Biessels (1936–2016), Dutch writer of children's literature
- Carli Hermès (born 1963), Dutch photographer and director
- Carli Lloyd (born 1982) American soccer player
- Carli Lloyd (volleyball) (born 1989), American volleyball player
- Carli Mosier, American voice actress and singer
- Carli Muñoz (born 1948), self-taught Puerto Rican jazz and rock pianist
- Carli de Murga (born 1988), Filipino footballer
- Carli Norris (born 1974), English actress
- Carli Renzi (born 1982), Australian judo competitor and wrestler
- Carli Tornehave (born 1932), Swedish singer and actor

== Middle name ==
- Carla Carli Mazzucato (born 1935), Italian artist

== Fictional characters ==
- Carli D'Amato, a character from British sitcom The Inbetweeners portrayed by Emily Head

== See also ==
- Carli (disambiguation)
- Carli (surname)
- Cali (surname)
- Cari (name)
- Carl (name)
- Carla
- Carle, surnames
- Carle (given name)
- Carlie
- Carlin (name)
- Carlo (name)
- Carly
- Caroli (surname)
- Carpi (surname)
- Charli (disambiguation)
- Carlia S. Westcott
