= Caple =

Caple is a surname. Notable people with the surname include:

- Chris Caple, British academic
- Christopher Caple (1559–1626), English politician
- Ian Caple, English recording engineer
- Jim Caple (1962–2023), American journalist
- Natalee Caple (born 1970), Canadian author
- Robert Caple (1939–2019), English cricketer
- Stephen Caple (born 1984), English cricketer
- Tim Caple (21st century), British television commentator

== See also ==
- Calle (name)
- CAPLE (Centro de Avaliação de Português Língua Estrangeira or Centre for Evaluation of Portuguese Language), entity that carries out examinations and certifications of European Portuguese as a second language
- Caples (disambiguation)
- Carle, surnames
- Carle (given name)
