= Carlen (surname) =

Carlen or Carlén is a Swedish surname that may refer to

== Carlen surname ==
- Eric Anders Carlen, American mathematician
- Jim Carlen (1933–2012), American football player, coach, and college athletics administrator
- Rolando Carlen (born 1966), Argentine football manager and former player

== Carlén surname ==
- Adam Carlén (born 2000), Swedish footballer
- Annette Carlén-Karlsson (born 1956), Swedish speed skater
- Emilie Flygare-Carlén (1807–1892), Swedish novelist
- Gustaf Carlén (1890–1975), Swedish long-distance runner
- Hilda Carlén (born 1991), Swedish football goalkeeper
- Octavia Carlén (1828 – 1881), Swedish writer
- Per Carlén (born 1960), Swedish handball player and coach

== See also ==
- Carle, surnames
- Carle (given name)
- Carlee
- Carlena
- Carlens
- Carles (name)
- Carlon
- Carlen v Drury
- Karlen
