= Carse (disambiguation) =

A carse is an area of fertile, low-lying land occupying certain Scottish river valleys.

Carse may also refer to:

- Mount Carse, a mountain having several peaks in the southern part of the Salvesen Range of South Georgia
- The City of Carse, a fantasy role-playing game supplement
- Carse (surname)

== See also ==
- Carré (disambiguation)
