= Carlie =

Carlie is an English feminine given name and nickname that is a feminine form of Carl and an alternate form of Carla. Notable people referred to by this name include the following:

== Given name ==
- Carlie Hanson (born 2000), American singer-songwriter
- Carlie Irsay-Gordon (born 1980), American football executive
- Carlie Kotyza-Witthuhn (born 1986/1987), American politician
- Carlie Pipe (born 1987), Barbadian long distance athlete

== Nickname/Stagename ==
- Carlie Boland, nickname of Cydnie Boland, American politician
- Carlie Geer, nickname of Charlotte Mosher "Carlie" Geer (born 1957), American rower

== Fictional characters ==
- Carlie Cooper Marvel Comics character
- Renesmee Carlie Cullen in the novel Breaking Dawn, part of the Twilight series

== See also ==
- Callie (disambiguation)
- Carle, surnames
- Carle (given name)
- Carli (given name)
- Carli (surname)
- Cârlig (disambiguation)
- Carlile (surname)
- Carlin (name)
- Carrie (name)
- Charlie (given name)
- Karlie
- Carlien Dirkse van den Heuvel
