= Sinopoli (surname) =

Sinopoli is a surname. Notable people with the surname include:

- Brad Sinopoli (born 1988), Canadian football player
- Carla Sinopoli (fl. from 1991), American anthropologist
- Giuseppe Sinopoli (1946–2001), Italian musician
- Paul Sinopoli (1975–2006), Canadian biker
- Matthew P. Sinopoli (born 1969), American Technologist and Volunteer Firefighter
