= Caples =

Caples may refer to:

== People ==
- Garrett Caples (b. 1972), American poet
- Harry Caples (1896 - 1933), Australian representative rugby league footballer
- Latrell Caples (born 2002), American football player
- Yvonne Caples (b. 1972), women's boxing champion

== Place name ==
- Caples, Washington, United States

== See also ==
- Caple, a surname
