= De Stem des Bloeds =

1930 film

- Directed by: Ph. Carli
- Produced by: Ph. Carli
- Starring: Sylvain Boekebinder; Vally Lank; Jan Kruyt; Annie Krohn
- Production company: Kinowerk Carli
- Release date: 1930 (Dutch East Indies)
- Country: Dutch East Indies
- Languages: Dutch; (intertitles)

De Stem des Bloeds (The Voice of Blood), also known as Njai Siti, is a 1930 film from the Dutch East Indies (now Indonesia). It was directed by Ph. Carli and starred Annie Krohn, Sylvain Boekebinder, Vally Lank, and Jan Kruyt. The film follows a man and his mistress who reunite after their son and step-daughter unwittingly fall in love. The black-and-white film, which may now be lost, was tinted different colours for certain scenes. It was released in early 1930 to commercial success, although critical opinion was mixed.

== Plot ==
Van Kempen is a supervisor at a tea plantation named Ciranu in West Java. He keeps a mistress, or njai, named Siti. Together they have two children, Adolf and Annie. One day, van Kempen returns to the Netherlands, leaving Siti and their young mixed-race children behind. In the Netherlands he marries a young widow and takes her daughter, Ervine, as his step-daughter. Siti, meanwhile, lives with her uncle in a hut in the forest and prays fervently for van Kempen's return, even asking for help from the local shaman (dukun).

Fifteen years later, after his wife dies, van Kempen and Ervine return to the Indies. He has been hired as a supervisor at another plantation, not far from his old place of work. He searches for Siti and the couple's children, but none of his old coworkers know where they are. Unbeknownst to van Kempen, his children have been raised as natives and wear the traditional clothes, although they have also received a Western education. Adolf has become a hunter, while Annie stays at home with their mother. Frederick, the new manager at Ciranu, has meanwhile fallen for Ervine and tries unsuccessfully to woo her.

Some time afterwards, as Ervine is wandering through the woods she stumbles upon a deer and, startled, faints. Adolf comes across her and brings her back to the plantation, where van Kempen recognises him and takes him on as a supervisor. Frederick, however, is jealous of Adolf and Ervine's relationship and entices the workers at van Kempen's plantation to go on strike until Adolf is fired. Although heartbroken, van Kempen must fire his son.

Adolf goes to Lampung, in Sumatra, to hunt elephants. Meanwhile, Frederick has begun wooing Annie, who rejects him as Ervine did before. When Adolf returns and hears of the supervisor's actions, he fights Frederick and knocks him out. Ervine, meanwhile, has heard that her lover has returned and goes to the hut in the woods, nearly fainting after being caught in a downpour. Adolf sends a letter to van Kempen telling him where to find Ervine. The family are reunited. (Note: Derived from Biran 2009, pp. 120–121)

== Production ==
De Stem des Bloeds was directed by Ph. "Flip" Carli, a man of mixed Indonesian-European descent who had previously made several documentaries. He targeted the film at Dutch audiences, which may account for the focus on native customs and farming; such coverage was unusual for contemporary works of fiction, although documentaries had handled the subject before. His production house, which handled the film, was the Bandung-based Kinowerk Carli; some contemporary reviews erroneously gave the house's name as Cosmos Film.

Production began in late 1929 or early 1930, with scenes shot in West Java and Sumatra. De Stem Des Bloed starred Annie Krohn, Carli's mixed-race wife, as Annie as well as Sylvain Boekebinder (van Kempen), Vally Lank, and Jan Kruyt. The story was advertised as being adapted from the novel of the same name.

Like all contemporary films produced in the Indies, De Stem des Bloeds had low production values. The film was silent and in black-and-white; the final production consisted of 3,652 meters of film. The intertitles were in Dutch, which the Indonesian film historian Misbach Yusa Biran notes that most viewers – those who were native or ethnic Chinese – were unable to read. In order to provide a semblance of colour, Carli tinted certain scenes entirely in one shade during post-production; for instance, a scene where farmers were gathering rice was tinted violet.

== Release and reception ==
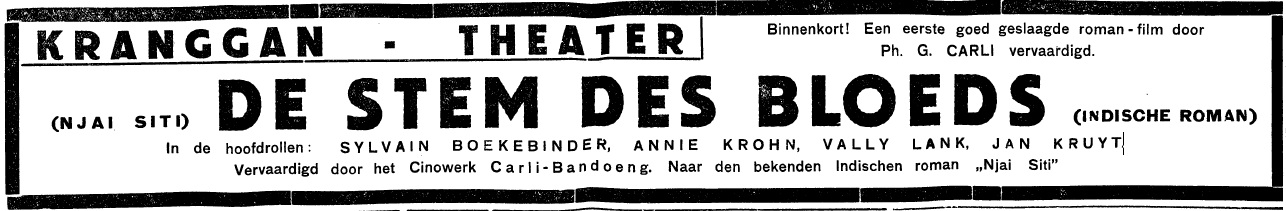
Newspaper advertisement, Surabaya

De Stem des Bloeds was released in 1930, seeing its Batavia (now Jakarta) premiere on 22 March of that year. By July it was being screened in Surabaya, East Java. It was reported to be a success, with native audiences filling the theatres in Batavia and Surabaya.

The film received mixed critical reception. An anonymous review in the Batavia-based Doenia Film praised the film's picture (especially its colour) and both Krohn and Boekebinder's acting. A review in the Surabaya-based De Indiesche Courant likewise praised the film, stating that it "fascinates from beginning to end" (Note: Original: "Het werk boeit van het begin tot het eind.") and showed that even in the Indies a "grand" film could be made. However, the review criticised the censorship bureau's failure to catch scenes of Frederick drinking alcohol, which the reviewer found "dangerous to the prestige [of Dutchmen]" considering the large native audiences. (Note: Original: "Daar deze film zoovele duizenden Inlanders trekt, schijnt ons de charge op den blanda-administrateur als drinker gevaarlijker voor het prestige...") Kwee Tek Hoay, writing in Panorama, criticised the film extensively, writing that it seemed meant exclusively for Dutch audiences in the Netherlands, as those living in the Indies would be able to see it did not reflect reality and was in places illogical. He found the colouring one extension of this lack of logic, writing that a violet tinge indicated that the farmers were harvesting rice at sunset – something that never happened.

== Legacy ==
Carli went on to make two more films starring Annie Krohn. The first, Sarinah (1931), was a romance set on the south coast of Java which had Krohn in the titular role. The second, Karina's Zelfopoffering (Karina's Sacrifice), followed the following year; this film saw Krohn play a mixed-raced woman living at the palace in the Sultanate of Yogyakarta. Karina's Zelfopoffering was a commercial failure and Carli left the Indies not long afterwards, moving to the Netherlands. He lived there until his death in 1972.

Writing in 2009, Biran suggests that De Stem des Bloeds was clearly written from an Indo point of view because of the positive roles of Indo children. He finds the film sympathetic to native culture, including the faithful njai. He notes with interest that, although in real life mixed-race children were faced with a sense of disgust, in De Stem des Bloeds an Indo man is heroic enough to rescue a pure Dutch woman and fight with a Dutchman.

The film is likely lost. The American visual anthropologist Karl G. Heider writes that all Indonesian films from before 1950 are lost. However, JB Kristanto's Katalog Film Indonesia (Indonesian Film Catalogue) records several as having survived at Sinematek Indonesia's archives, and Biran writes that several Japanese propaganda films have survived at the Netherlands Government Information Service.

== Works cited ==
- Abel, Richard (2005). Encyclopedia of Early Cinema. New York: Routledge. ISBN 978-0-415-23440-5.
- Biran, Misbach Yusa (2009). Sejarah Film 1900–1950: Bikin Film di Jawa [History of Film 1900–1950: Making Films in Java] (in Indonesian). Jakarta: Komunitas Bamboo working with the Jakarta Art Council. ISBN 978-979-3731-58-2.
- "Carli, F". Encyclopedia of Jakarta (in Indonesian). Jakarta: Jakarta City Government. Archived from the original on 4 March 2016.
- "De Films der Week" [Films this Week]. De Indiesch Courant (in Dutch). 26 July 1930. p. 11.
- "De Stem Des Bloed (Njai Siti)". filmindonesia.or.id (in Indonesian). Jakarta: Konfiden Foundation. Archived from the original on 2 December 2013.
- "Indische filmkunst" [Indies Cinema]. De Indische Courant (in Dutch). Surabaya. 11 June 1931. p. 5. Archived from the original on 2 December 2013.
- Heider, Karl G (1991). Indonesian Cinema: National Culture on Screen. Honolulu: University of Hawaii Press. ISBN 978-0-8248-1367-3.
- "Tijdschriften" [Magazines]. De Indische Courant (in Dutch). Surabaya. 19 March 1930. p. 5.
- "(untitled)" (PDF). De Indische Courant (in Dutch). 19 July 1930. p. 11.
- "Vermakelijkheden en Bioscopen" [Amusements and Cinemas]. Soerabaijasch Handelsblad (in Dutch). Surabaya: Kolff & Co. 24 July 1930. p. 10.
