= Carlens =

Carlens is born a given name and a surname. Notable people with the name include:

- Carlens Arcus (born 1996), Haitian association football player
- Stef Kamil Carlens (born 1970), Belgian singer-songwriter, musician, composer, and record producer

== See also ==
- Carlen (surname)
