= Karina's Zelfopoffering =

1932 film

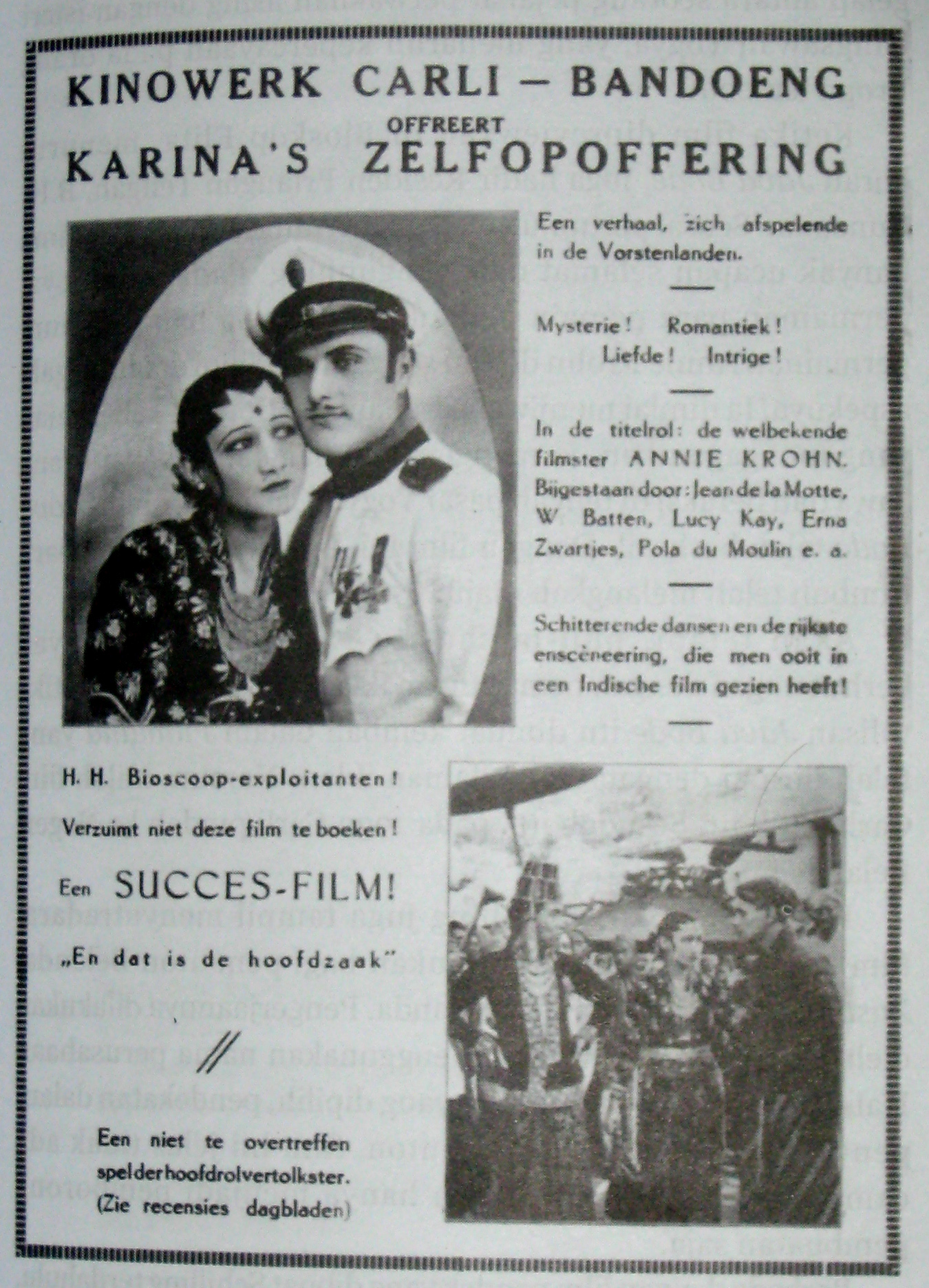
- Advertisement
- Directed by: Ph. Carli
- Produced by: Ph. Carli
- Starring: Annie Krohn
- Production company: Kinewerk Carli
- Release date: 1932 (Dutch East Indies)
- Country: Dutch East Indies

Karina's Zelfopoffering, also known by the Indonesian name Pengorbanan Karina (both meaning Karina's Sacrifice) is a 1932 film from the Dutch East Indies (now Indonesia). It was directed by Ph. Carli and starred Annie Krohn.

== Plot ==
Raden Ajeng Karina is of mixed-descent, born to a Dutch mother – who has since returned to the Netherlands – and a Javanese father from Kraton Ngayogyakarta Hadiningrat. She lives in the palace at Yogyakarta and must integrate herself with the majority of Javanese society. In doing so she wears traditional clothes such as the kebaya. She later becomes involved in a love triangle with a foreign representative stationed in the city and his wife.

== Production ==
Karina's Zelfopoffering was directed by Ph. Carli, who had been trained as a documentary filmmaker and had made his feature film debut two years earlier with De Stem des Bloeds. It starred his wife, Annie Krohn. Production was handled by Carli's Bandung-based company, Kinowerk Carli.

One of the film's posters advertised "the most brilliant dancing and richest staging ever seen in a film from the Indies". (Note: Original: ... schitterende dansen en de rijkste enscenering, die men ooit in een indische film gezien heeft") This same poster gave the cast as including Jean de la Motte, W. Batten, Lucy Kay, Erna Zwartjes, and Pola du Moulin. An announcement in the Medan-based daily De Soematra Post, meanwhile, records all actors except Krohn as natives.

== Release and reception ==
Karina's Zelfopoffering was released in 1932, having its premiere at Elita Theatre in Bandung and was attended by Central Priangan residen, B.H. Kuneman. It had reached Medan by 30 January 1933. The film was a commercial failure. However, it received positive reviews. One in a local newspaper, Java Bode, praised Krohn's performance, finding that – although all actors had done well – she had been exceptional. According to Biran, these positive reviews were likely for advertising revenue; he notes that one positive review was reprinted with two pages of advertisements.

Karina's Zelfopoffering proved to be Carli's last film in the Indies. He left the colony soon afterwards and went to the Netherlands.

The film is likely lost. The American visual anthropologist Karl G. Heider writes that all Indonesian films from before 1950 are lost. However, JB Kristanto's Katalog Film Indonesia (Indonesian Film Catalogue) records several as having survived at Sinematek Indonesia's archives, and Biran writes that several Japanese propaganda films have survived at the Netherlands Government Information Service.

== Works cited ==
- Biran, Misbach Yusa (2009). Sejarah Film 1900–1950: Bikin Film di Jawa [History of Film 1900–1950: Making Films in Java] (in Indonesian). Jakarta: Komunitas Bamboo working with the Jakarta Art Council. ISBN 978-979-3731-58-2.
- "Filmnieuws: Karina's Zelfopoffering" [Film News: Karina's Zelfopoffering]. De Sumatra Post (in Dutch). Medan: J. Hallermann. 27 January 1933. p. 3.
- Heider, Karl G (1991). Indonesian Cinema: National Culture on Screen. Honolulu: University of Hawaii Press. ISBN 978-0-8248-1367-3.
- Said, Salim (1982). Profil Dunia Film Indonesia [Profile of Indonesian Cinema] (in Indonesian). Jakarta: Grafiti Pers. OCLC 9507803.
