= Marquis of Pietrapelosa =

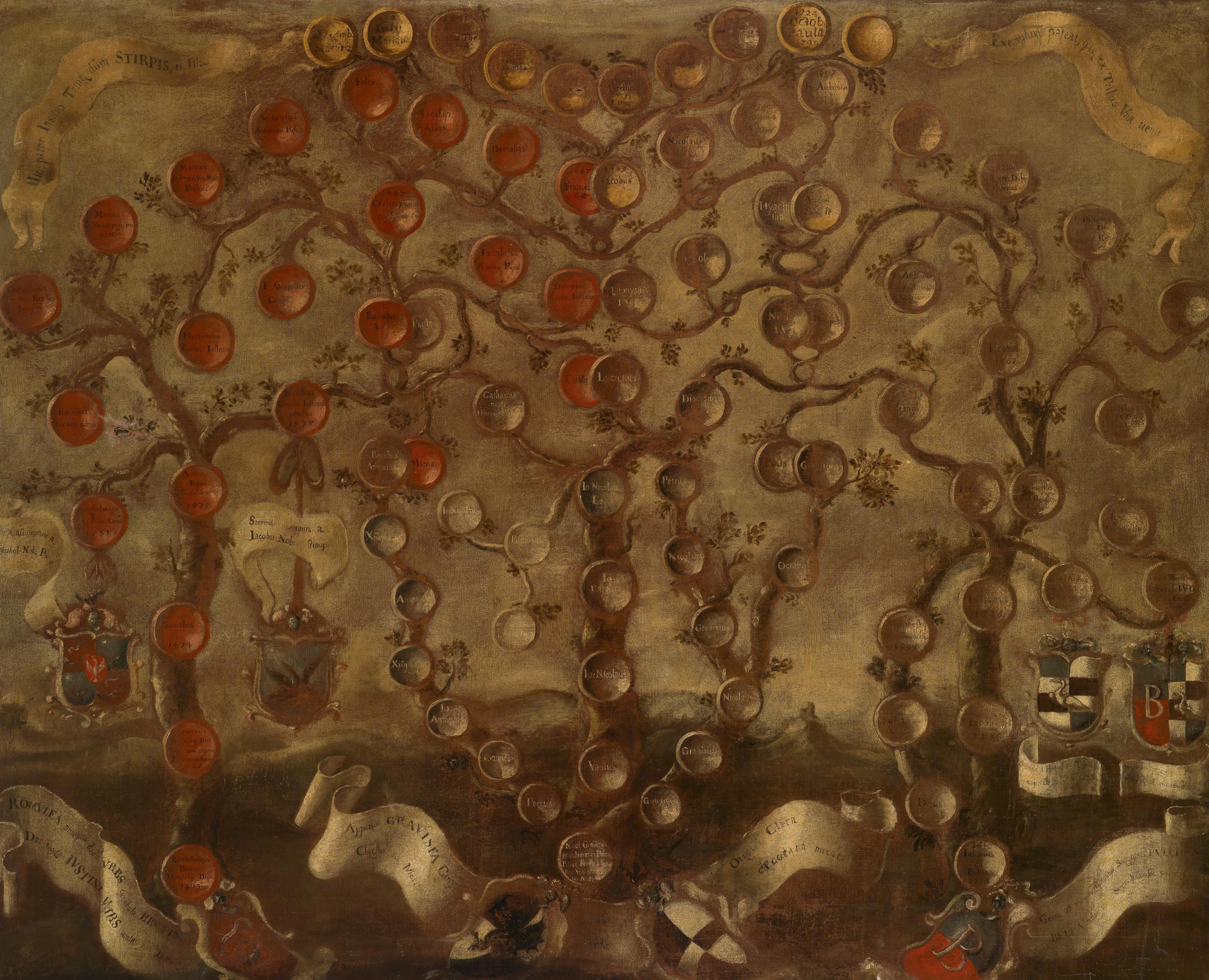
18th-century family tree of the Gravisi counts

The Marquis of Pietrapelosa is a title held by the Gravisi family of Koper (Capodistria), since 1440. The name comes from the castle of Pietrapelosa (also called Kostel), at the center of the estate. The Gravisi-Barbabianca Palace and Gravisi-Buttorai Palace in Koper were both family residences.

== Foundation ==
The first Marquis was Nicolò Gravisi, who foiled a plot in 1435 to betray Padua to Marsilio da Carrara and in return in 1439 received a pension of 400 ducats from the Republic of Venice. From 1440 the pension was reduced to 250 ducats in exchange for the Marquisate of Pietrapelosa, which gave an annual income of 150 ducats. It was the largest estate in Istria, a collection of villages between Koper, Buzet and the border with the Habsburg county. Nicolò Gravisi renovated the Pietrapelosa castle for use as a summer residence. In 1635 a fire destroyed the interior of the castle, but it was restored and inhabited until the 18th century.

== Notable family members ==
Nicolò Gravisi had four sons, each of whom founded branches of the family. In 1446 the Gravisi were admitted to the nobility of Capodistria with the title of Marquis. In 1662 this was confirmed in Venice, and later in Austria by the Emperor Francis I. The family included both scholars and soldiers. Pietro Gravisi (1520–88) commanded a galley during the Battle of Lepanto in 1571, and fought in the War of Siena and against the Ottomans. Lucrezio Gravisi (1558-1613) was a cavalry commander in the army of the Polish King Sigismund III Vasa, who made him a knight for his services in Prussia and Russia.

Several of the rectors of the school in Koper were from the family. Giuseppe (1704–74) was a writer and poet. One of the more notable members of the family was the scholar Girolamo Gravisi. Gravisi was born at Pietrapelosa on 15 June 1720. He was a humanist who read widely in Hebrew and Greek, studying theology and also literature. Among his surviving work is a 16-page manuscript on the Lutheran reformer Matthias Flacius, declared a heretic by the Catholic church. Gerolamo's son Dionysius was born in 1750. He was also a scholar and a poet. He made a translation of Voltaire's Alzira which was performed in many theaters in Italy. Dionysius was sickly since childhood and died in Venice in 1768.

In 1782 the two branches of the Gravisi family controlled 36% of the olive presses in Koper. After the olives were badly damaged by cold in the winter of 1782-83, the Senate of Venice called on the patricians in Koper to advance studies of agriculture, particularly of olive groves. Eventually, Marquis Girolamo Gravisi wrote a Memoir on the olive trees in 1794-95. The Republic of Venice fell to the French army led by Napoleon in 1797, with Trieste occupied in April 1797. The pension paid to the Gravisi was stopped, and the Gravisi started a long correspondence with the Austrians and the French to get it restored. In October 1808 Girolamo Gravisi was named by the French viceroy Eugène de Beauharnais as a candidate for the Senate of the new Kingdom of Italy. He died in Koper on 31 March 1812 aged 92.

The Gravis family owned the castle of Pietrapelosa until the final abolition of the feudal system in 1869. They were the only aristocratic family in Koper to own such an estate. As late as 1878 Caterina De Gravisi, widow of Giuseppe Gravisi, was recorded as the owner of the Palazzo Gravisi Buttorai in Koper.
