= Lucrezio Gravisi =

- Born: c. 1558
- Died: 30 December 1613
- Occupation: Mercenary

Lucrezio Gravisi (c. 1558 – 30 December 1613) was a Venetian freelance soldier from Capodistra in Istria, now Koper in Slovenia.

He was knighted by the King of Poland. For some time he commanded the castle of Brescia. He was assassinated in Dalmatia while travelling to the east.

Lucrezio Gravisi was a member of the family of the Marquis of Pietrapelosa, based in Capodistria but named after their estate of Pietrapelosa in the interior of Istria.

== Biography ==
He was born in Capodistra in 1558. By the age of 16, he had sailed on the galley of his relative Pietro Gravisi in the war against the Turks. He travelled in Spain and Portugal, and then to the court of the Polish King Sigismund III Vasa.

In 1588 Sigismund made him a knight for his services in Prussia and Muscovy. In 1606 he was Sigismund's representative in a mission to the papal court in Rome.

Lucrezio Gravisi became a soldier of fortune, helping fight the Turks at Buda. For a year he guarded the castle of Brescia for the Venetian Republic. Returning to Venice, he was dispatched to Candia (Crete) with two companies of soldiers to stop the raids of pirates.

However, while in the harbour in Mandre, a port on the island of Pag in Dalmatia, pirates in six boats attacked his galley at night while the crew was sleeping. All the occupants were killed, including Gravisi, and their bodies were thrown into the sea.

His wife Paola Strassoldo, his brother and his cousin were also killed in this incident.
