= Carse (surname) =

Carse is a surname, and may refer to:

- Adam Carse (1878–1958), British composer and musicologist
- Bill Carse (1914–2000), Canadian ice hockey player
- Bob Carse (1919–1999), Canadian ice hockey player
- Brydon Carse (born 1995), English cricketer
- Duncan Carse (1913–2004), British explorer and actor
- A. Duncan Carse (1876–1938), British artist
- James Alexander Carse (born 1958), Zimbabwean cricketer
- James Howe Carse (ca. 1819–1900), British-Australian artist
- James P. Carse, American academic
- Matilda Carse (1835–1917), Irish-American businesswoman and social reformer
- Stef Carse (born 1965), Canadian pop singer

== See also ==
- Carle, surnames
- Carle (given name)
- Carré (surname)
