= Maxwell Museum of Anthropology =

Museum in the University of New Mexico

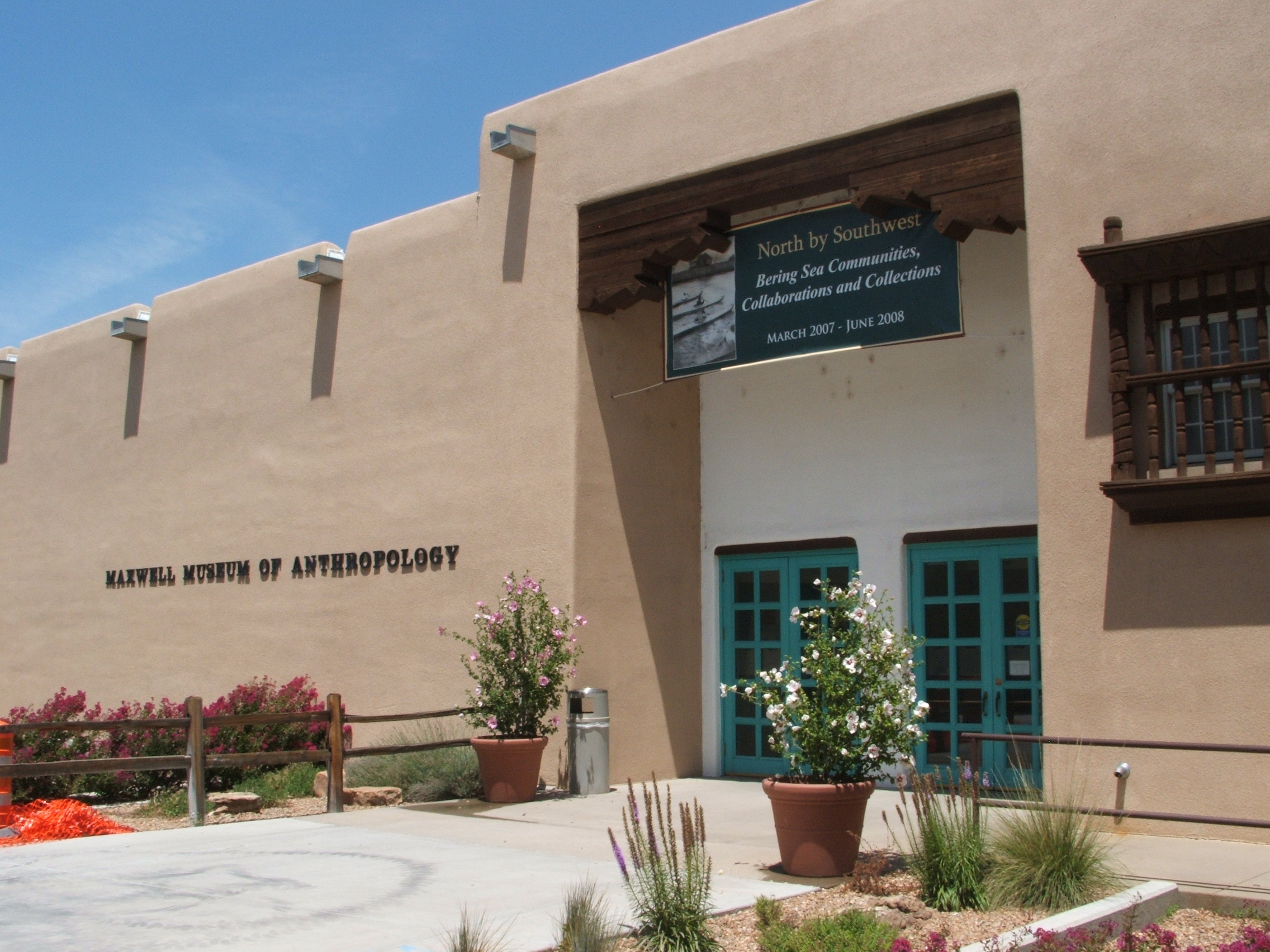
- Front Entrance
- Established: 1932 (current location since 1961)
- Location: University of New Mexico campus, Albuquerque, New Mexico; United States
- Coordinates: 35.0852°N 106.6250°W
- Director: Carla Sinopoli
- Website: maxwellmuseum.unm.edu/

The Maxwell Museum of Anthropology is an anthropology museum located on the University of New Mexico campus in Albuquerque, New Mexico. The museum was founded in 1932 as the Museum of Anthropology of the University of New Mexico, becoming the first public museum in Albuquerque. In 1972 it was renamed the Maxwell Museum of Anthropology in honor of philanthropists Dorothy and Gilbert Maxwell.

== History ==
The museum was established in 1932 as the Museum of Anthropology of the University of New Mexico by Edgar Lee Hewett, an active anthropologist who founded the University's anthropology department four years earlier. The museum was created to house and display the growing collection of artifacts gathered from field schools of archaeological research associated with the UNM Anthropology Department, the School of American Research, and the Museum of New Mexico.

Frank C. Hibben was the first director of the museum and expanded its holdings by collecting archaeological materials from around the world and in trade with other museums. Exhibits were first situated in UNM's Rodey Hall, which was demolished in 1971. The museum moved to Scholes Hall in 1935, then to the current site in 1961. In 1972 a major construction project expanded museum facilities, which was funded by the philanthropists Dorothy and Gilbert Maxwell. The museum was renamed in their honor and since then, it has been recognized as an important regional museum and a nationally known research center.

== Exhibits ==
The museum has five exhibit areas that host permanent and changing exhibits which express the human cultural experience. The Ancestors permanent exhibit traces human evolution over four million years and features life-size models of human ancestors. The People of the Southwest permanent exhibit depicts eleven thousand years of the cultural heritage of the American Southwest and features artifacts from Mimbres, Ancestral Puebloan, and Puebloan cultures, as well as displays on UNM field work in New Mexico, which includes a reconstruction of an excavation at Chaco Canyon. The museum's North Gallery, Bawden Gallery (named after Garth Bawden, museum director 1985-2005), and the Ortiz Center Gathering Space (named for the late Alfonso Ortiz, a noted UNM anthropology professor) host changing exhibits featuring artifacts from the extensive museum collection as well as traveling exhibits. The museum's courtyard featured a 46-foot (14 m)-high totem pole brought to the museum from British Columbia in 1941. The totem pole was restored and is now housed in the lobby of the Anthropology Department's Hibben Center building next to the museum.

== Gallery ==
Dorothy and Gilbert Maxwell c.1970

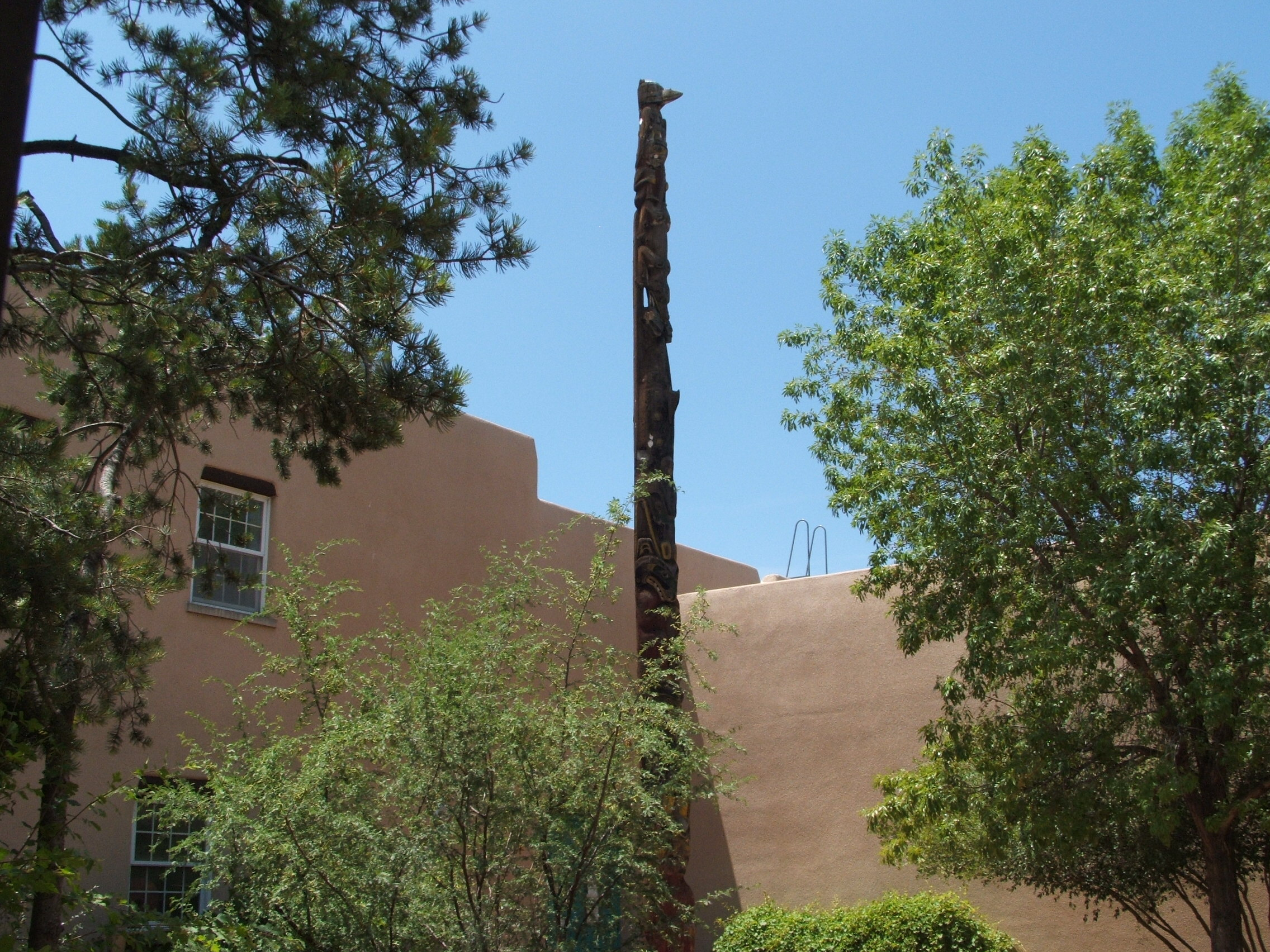
The Museum's totem pole
