= Bernardo Ribas Carli =

Brazilian politician (1986–2018)

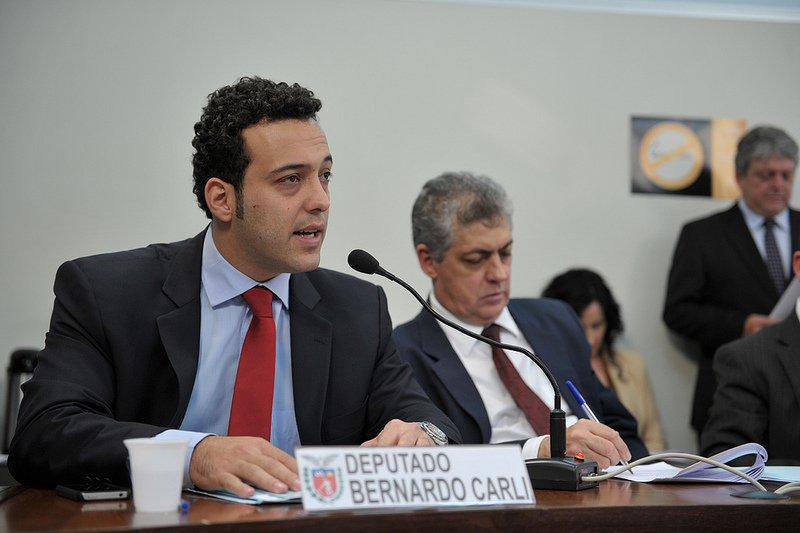
- Ribas Carli in 2013

Member of the Legislative Assembly of Paraná
- In office August 6, 2011 – July 22, 2018

Personal details
- Born: February 26, 1986 Guarapuava, Paraná, Brazil
- Died: July 22, 2018 (aged 32) Paula Freitas, Paraná, Brazil
- Party: Brazilian Social Democracy Party (PSDB)
- Relatives: Ana Rita Slaviero Guimarães Carli (mother); Luis Fernando Ribas Carli (father); Fernando Ribas Carli Filho (brother)
- Education: Universidade Positivo

Bernardo Ribas Carli (February 26, 1986 – July 22, 2018) was a Brazilian politician and member of the Brazilian Social Democracy Party (PSDB). He served as a state deputy in the Legislative Assembly of Paraná from 2011 until his death in office due to plane crash in 2018.

Carli was a native of the city of Guarapuava, where his family had built a political base. His father, Luis Fernando Ribas Carli, is a former three-term Mayor of Guarapuava, state deputy and federal deputy. His brother, Fernando Ribas Carli Filho, is a former Paraná state deputy who resigned from the Legislative Assembly and was expelled from his party in 2009 following a fatal drunk driving car crash in Curitiba. Fernando Ribas Carli Filho was later sentenced to nine years in prison for his role in accident, which killed two people.

Following the arrest and resignation of his brother, Bernardo Ribas Carli became a first time candidate for the Legislative Assembly of Paraná in 2010. He was elected to the state legislative assembly as a member of the Brazilian Social Democracy Party (PSDB). Ribas Carli's election was nullified in 2011 due to irregular expenses in his 2010 campaign. However, the nullification was later overturned and Bernardo Ribas Carli was allowed to remain in the state Legislative Assembly.

On July 22, 2018, Bernardo Ribas Carli was killed in a small plane crash in a forested area in the city of Paula Freitas, near Paraná's state border with Santa Catarina. The pilot and co-pilot were also killed. Bernardo Ribas Carli was 32 years old.
