= Giuseppe Lorenzo Gatteri =

Italian painter

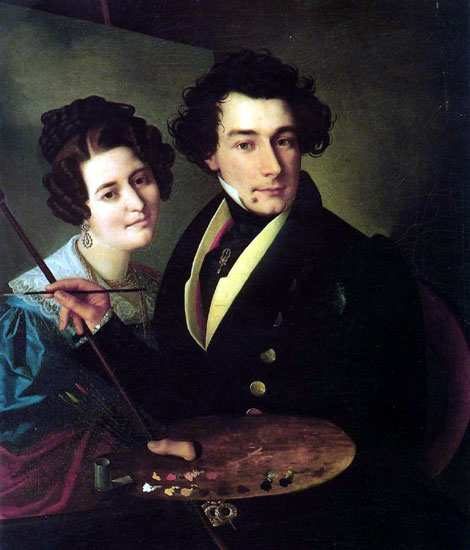
- Born: 18 September 1829; Trieste, Austrian Empire
- Died: 1 December 1884 (aged 55); Trieste, Austria-Hungary
- Movement: Romanticism

Giuseppe Lorenzo Gatteri (18 September 1829 – 1 December 1884) was an artist from Trieste.

He was well known for his drawings and paintings in the romantic historical style, including numerous book illustrations. His frescoes decorate various buildings in Trieste and surroundings.

== Early years ==
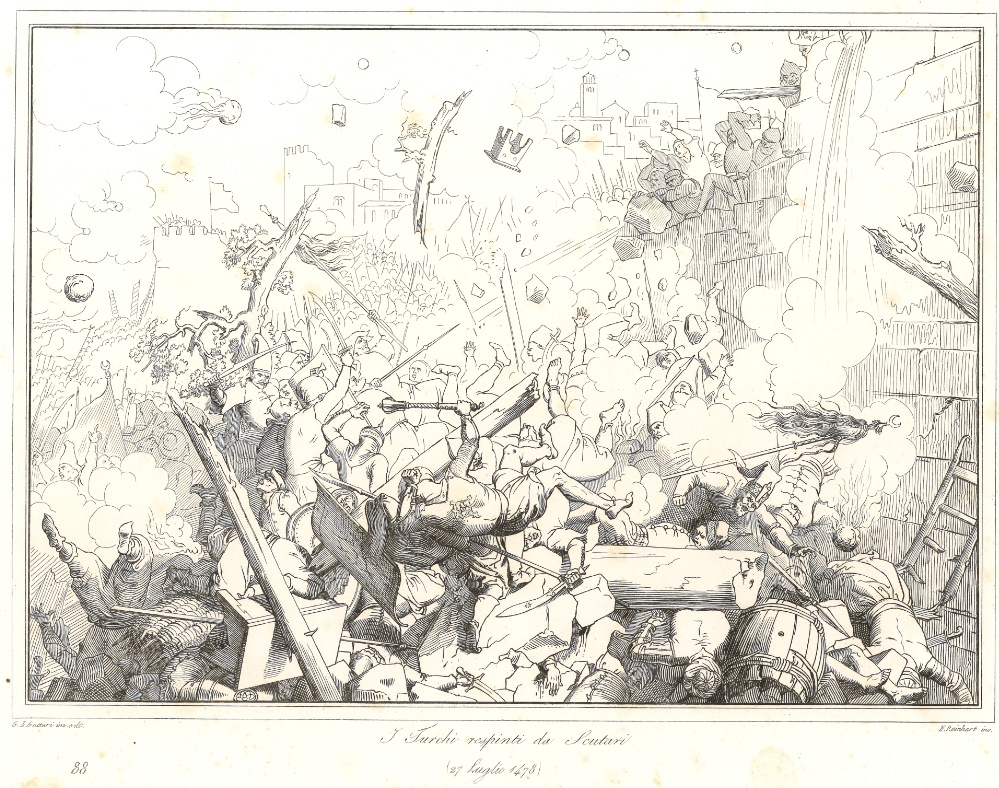
Assault upon the Shkodra Castle by Ottoman forces in the siege of Shkodra of 1478–9 (1860)

Giuseppe Lorenzo Gatteri was born in Trieste on 18 September 1829. His father, also named Giuseppe Gatteri, was a well-known oil and fresco painter who had moved in 1824 to Trieste from Rivolto, near Codroipo in Friuli. In 1840 his father took Giuseppe Lorenzo with him to Venice, there the son became a pupil of other painters, supported by a scholarship from the municipality of Trieste. Gatteri was described as a child prodigy; by the age of 11 he impressed members of the Minerva Society in Venice with his ability to improvise drawings of episodes from antiquity. (Note: A contemporary Art Journal lauded Gatteri's force and truth of his outlines, the correct proportion of the figures, the spirit of the attitudes, the eloquence of expression in the faces, the fidelity of the costume, the happy arrangement of all the accessories, the grace and beauty of the groups and episodes, and the wonderful harmony of the work as a whole. — (Exhibitions at Brescia... 1840))

Gatteri's teachers encouraged him to follow the Romantic style of painting while respecting the Venetian school's tradition of warm color. He exhibited two pen drawings in the Trieste Society of Fine Arts in 1841, and three more the next year. In 1842 his father took Giuseppe Lorenzo to Milan, where again he was shown off at gatherings of the elite as a child prodigy. He greatly impressed the nobility by the speed and quality of his work and his sense for composition. In 1843 his father took him to Turin. He was received by King Charles Albert of Sardinia, who commissioned a series of drawings. The Venice Academy of Fine Arts awarded him prizes in 1845, 1847 and 1851.

== Later career ==
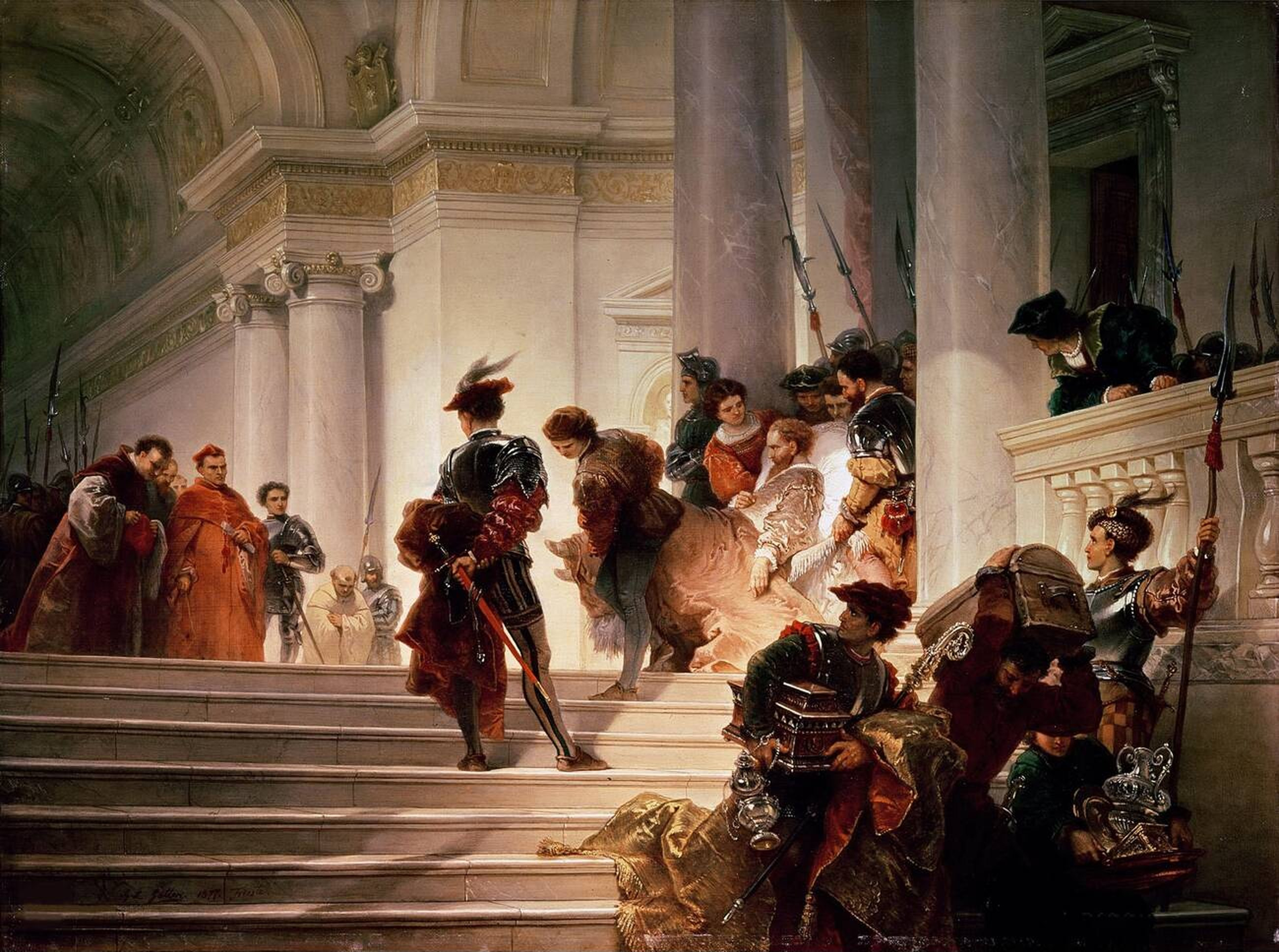
Cesare Borgia leaving the Vatican (1877)

Gatteri illustrated several literary and historical books. After his return to Trieste in 1857 he illustrated a biography of the sailor C. Costantini, a history of Trieste and a book of poems by Pietro Zorutti in the Friulian language. He prepared 150 drawings for a History of Venice (1852) by Francesco Zanotto. The plates were engraved by Antonio Viviani and other Venetian artists.

He decorated the ceremonial hall of the Gravisi-Barbabianca Palace in Koper (Capodistria). The fresco on the ceiling depicts Apollo on a chariot. He decorated several cafes in Trieste. In a magnificent villa on the Via Ginnastica in Trieste he painted the ceiling of one of the rooms with a fresco 5 metres (16 ft) square depicting a youthful Emperor Franz Joseph I of Austria and the Empress Elizabeth on horseback surrounded by heraldic symbols and lesser personages.

Gatteri was appointed curator of the Revoltella Museum in Trieste from 1873 to 1876. He was co-founder and the first chairman of an art association in 1884.

== Work ==
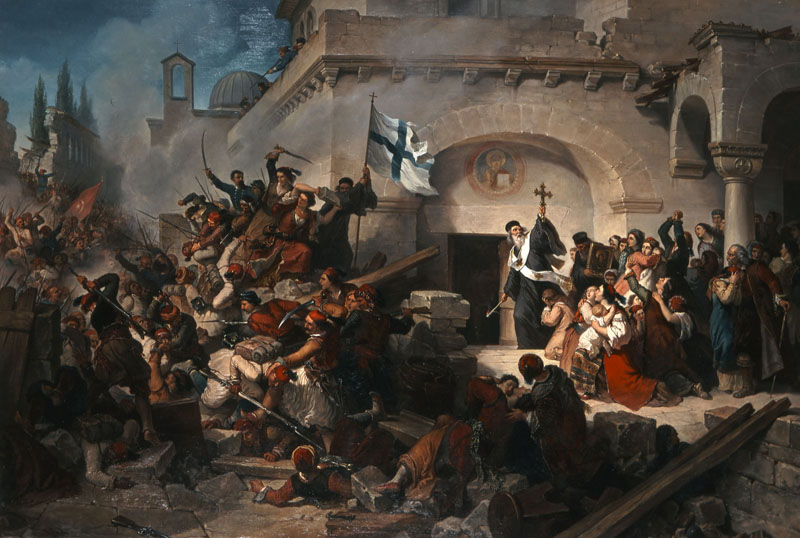
The Arcadian Holocaust – scene from the Cretan Revolt (1866–69)

Gatteri paints historic themes in the style of Romanticism. The Revoltella Museum in Trieste contains many of his masterworks, including: The Feast of Mary, Arrival of the Queen of Cyprus in Venice (1864), Entertainment given by Cardinal Riario to the Duchess of Ferrara (1872), Cesare Borgia leaving the Vatican (1877) and Minerva awarded the Arts and the Virtues (1884), thought to be his last work. His book illustrations were also important, including those for Dante's Divine Comedy, Francesco Zanotto's Venetian History (1852) and Vincenzo Scussa's Chronological History of Trieste (1863).

Gatteri's works, whether in oils or on paper, were always dramatic compositions, decorated with rich period costumes, brightly colored or bejeweled or shining armor. He has been criticized for taking excessive care to depict clean and bright surfaces, to render excessive detail, and thus to lose life and spontaneity. Another critic has called him a scholar of costume and of theatrical decoration of dead ages, who failed to understand what his paintings depicted.

== Gallery ==
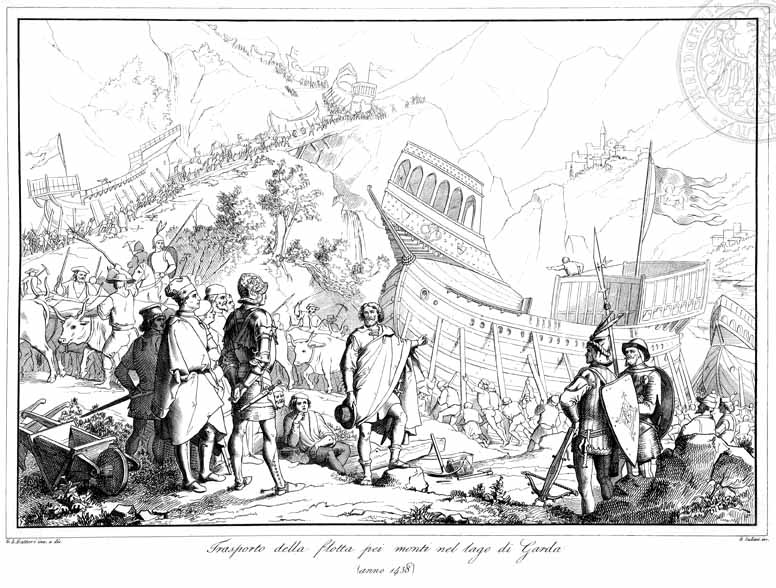
Transport of the fleet over the mountains to Lake Garda (1852)

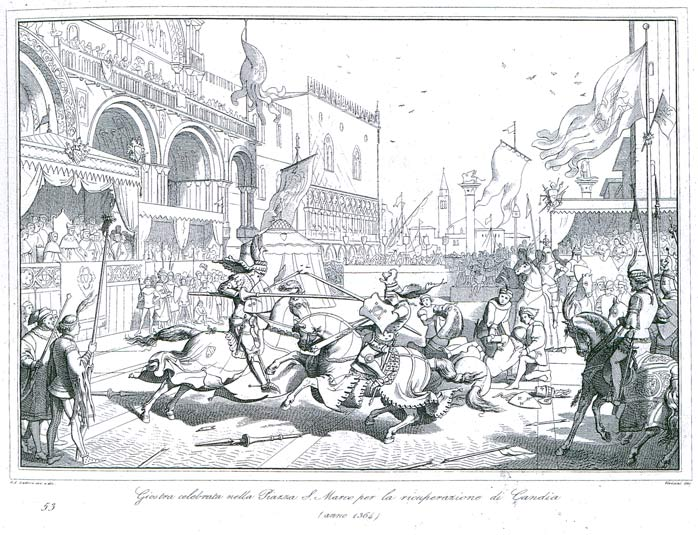
Joust in the Piazza St. Marco celebrating the recovery of Candia (1852)

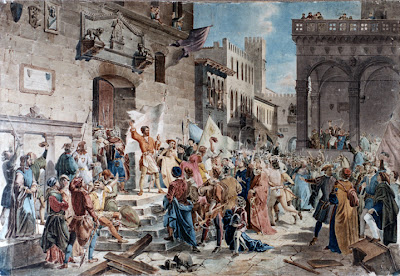
The tumult of the Ciompi

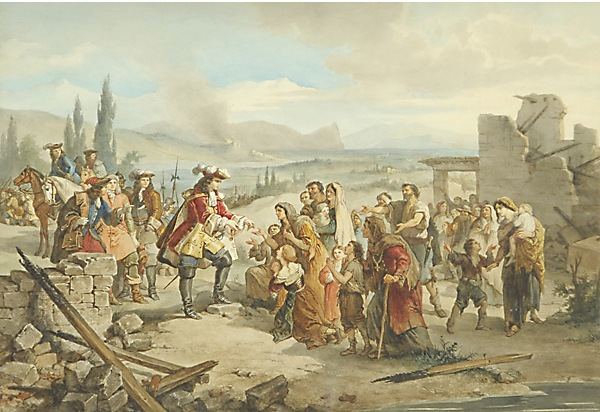
Generosity of the House of Savoy

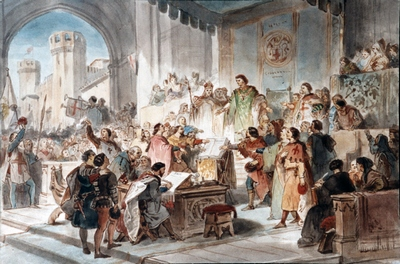
Sketch for Episode of the House of Savoy

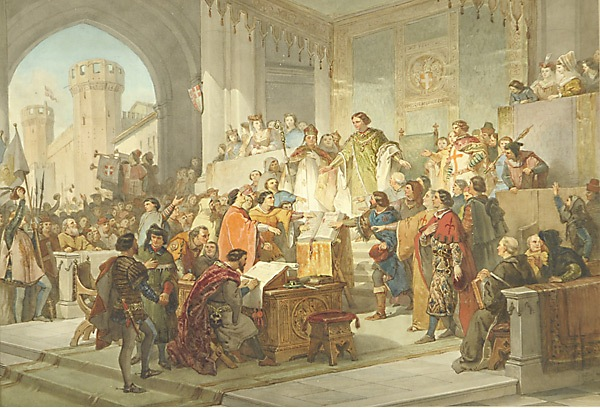
Episode of the House of Savoy

== Sources ==
- Bibliothèque nationale (1877). Bulletin mensuel des publications étrangères reçues par le Département des imprimés de la Bibliothèque nationale (in Italian). C. Klincksieck.
- Cohen-Solal, Annie (2010). Leo and His Circle: The Life of Leo Castelli. Random House of Canada. ISBN 978-1400044276.
- "Gatteri, Giuseppe Lorenzo <1829 - 1884>" (in Italian). Comune di Trieste. Archived from the original on 2022-02-02.
- "Exhibitions at Brescia, Verona, Venice, &c. &c.". The Art journal, Volume 2. Virtue & co. 1840.
- Fasolato, Patrizia (1999). "GATTERI, Giuseppe Lorenzo". Dizionario Biografico degli Italiani (in Italian). Vol. 52: Gambacorta–Gelasio 2. Rome: Istituto dell'Enciclopedia Italiana. ISBN 978-88-12-00032-6.
- "Gravisi Barbabianca Palace". Slovenian Tourist Board.
- "Palača Gravisi-Barbabianca (1710–2010)" (in Slovenian). Glasbena šola Koper. Archived from the original on 2012-04-26.

== References and Further reading ==
- Ulrich Thieme; Felix Becker (1920). "Gatteri, Giuseppe Lorenzo". Allgemeines Lexikon der Bildenden Künstler von der Antike bis zur Gegenwart (in German). Vol. 13. Leipzig: E. A. Seemann. p. 249.
