= Nicolò Gravisi =

Italian nobleman

- Born: 1396; Piran
- Occupation: Soldier
- Known for: First Marquis of Pietrapelosa

Nicolò Gravisi (born 1396) was the first Marquis of Pietrapelosa in Istria, which he received in return for foiling a plot to betray the Republic of Venice.

== Biography ==
According to Prospero Petronio the Gravisi family originated in Tuscany. A Domenico de Gravisi was mentioned as living in Pirano in 1337. Nicolò Gravisi was born in 1396, son of Vanto Gravisi di Pirano. In the night of 7 March 1435 Gravisi was captain of the guard of one door to the city of Padua. He discovered a plot by some Paduans to deliver it to Marsilio, son of the former ruler Francesco Novello da Carrara, who had been deposed and later executed. He arrested the rebels and saved the city for the republic.

As a reward for this and many other actions, on 10 March 1440 the doge Francesco Foscari assigned an annual pension of 260 gold ducats to Gravisi and his successors, granted him the castle and estates of Pietrapelosa, and gave him the title of Marquis of Pietrapelosa. Pietrapelosa, which gave an annual income of 150 ducats, was a collection of "villes" between Capodistria (Koper), Pinguentino (Buzet) and the border with the Habsburg County of Pazin. It was the largest estate in Istria. It included the domains of Stridone, San Quirico, Cepici, Salice and Pregara. The family was accepted into the Great Council of Capodistria on 25 March 1466.

== Legacy ==
After the death of Nicolò Gravisi the family was divided into four branches, the descendants of his sons Michele, Gravise, Pietro and Vanto. The family of the first-born Michele i Gravisi created ties of marriage with the Barbabianca and Bocchina families. In the nineteenth century the heirs of Gravise and Pietro were still settled in Buzet. The descendants of Vanto, the fourth son, lived in Koper. Some became well-known writers and scholars. Nicolò Gravisi's descendants included soldiers such as Pietro Gravisi and Lucrezio Gravisi, who both served in the Battle of Lepanto in 1571, and scholars such as Girolamo Gravisi.
