= Pietro Gravisi =

- Born: 1520
- Died: 1588 (aged 67–68)
- Occupation: Marquis of Pietrapelosa
- Known for: Battle of Lepanto

Pietro Gravisi (1520–1588), Marquis of Pietrapelosa, was the commander of a Venetian galley in the Battle of Lepanto in 1571, and fought in the War of Siena and against the Ottomans.

His relative Lucrezio Gravisi (1558–1613), later to by knighted by the Polish King Sigismund III Vasa, served on his galley as a boy. On 1 June 1573 General Foscarini made him captain of the Slavs in the province of Istria "for the service paid by him and by his four brothers on land and sea throughout this war, in which two of them died in service, and for his expenses and hardships suffered in the service of the most serene dominions." He died in 1588 and was buried in the Capodistria cathedral.
