= Flip Carli =

Association footballer and film director/producer

Ph. G. Carli
- Born: 1879; Bandung, West Java
- Died: 1972
- Other names: Flip
- Spouse: Annie Krohn

Ph. G. "Flip" Carli (1879–1972) was a footballer turned film director from the Dutch East Indies (now Indonesia).

== Biography ==
Carli was born in Bandung, West Java, in 1879. His father was a major in the Dutch military of Italian descent, while his mother was native. Carli went to the Netherlands around age seven, where he completed his education. As a youth he expressed an interest in football, playing for his school team. He later acquired the nickname "Flip". In 1901, soon after graduation, Carli returned to the Indies and took a job at a sugar factory. Although he remained active in football, around this time he took up an interest in photography. He eventually moved to the colony's capital at Batavia (now Jakarta) to open his own photography shop.

By 1919 Carli had become interested in filmmaking, establishing his own company in Bandung named Kinowerk Carli to make documentaries. His first success, and his most popular documentary, followed the 1919 eruption of Mount Kelud in East Java. He later made a film promoting the Post Savings Bank. In 1925 he planned to make another documentary film covering a night fair in Bandung, but he ultimately was unable to do so; his permit was revoked and the contract went to a foreign director. His last recorded documentary showed a rectory in Bandung.

During a 1926 polemic between several newspapers in the Indies, Carli expressed his belief that locally produced films would be able to compete with works produced professionally in the United States and Europe. He followed this by directing De Stem des Bloeds (The Voice of Blood), a film which follows a man and his mistress who reunite after their son and step-daughter unwittingly fall in love. Although the film was shot in black-and-white, Carli tinted some scenes entirely in one colour; this gave an effect which one reviewer likened to seeing farmers working at dusk. The film, targeted at Dutch audiences, was reportedly a commercial success, although critical reception was mixed. Around this time he had married Annie Krohn, a mixed-race actress who had starred in De Stem des Bloeds.

Two years later, Carli released his second theatrical work. Entitled Karina's Zelfopoffering (Karina's Sacrifice), the film starred Carli's wife Annie as a mixed-race woman living at the palace in Yogyakarta. This film was not successful, and soon afterwards Carli returned to the Netherlands. He died in 1972.

== Filmography ==
- De Stem des Bloeds (The Voice of Blood; 1930)
- Sarinah (1931)
- Karina's Zelfopoffering (Karina's Sacrifice; 1932)

== Works cited ==
- Abel, Richard (2005). Encyclopedia of Early Cinema. New York: Routledge. ISBN 978-0-415-23440-5.
- Apa Siapa Orang Film Indonesia [What and Who: Film Figures in Indonesia] (in Indonesian). Jakarta: Indonesian Ministry of Information. 1999. OCLC 44427179.
- Biran, Misbach Yusa (2009). Sejarah Film 1900–1950: Bikin Film di Jawa [History of Film 1900–1950: Making Films in Java] (in Indonesian). Jakarta: Komunitas Bamboo working with the Jakarta Art Council. ISBN 978-979-3731-58-2.
- "Carli, F". Encyclopedia of Jakarta (in Indonesian). Jakarta: Jakarta City Government. Archived from the original on 4 March 2016.
- "De Stem Des Bloed (Njai Siti)". filmindonesia.or.id (in Indonesian). Jakarta: Konfiden Foundation. Archived from the original on 2 December 2013.
