= Erwin Carlé =

German journalist (1876–1923)

Erwin Carlé (pseudonym Erwin Rosen (7 June 1876 in Karlsruhe – 1 February 1923 in Hamburg) was a German writer and journalist.

Carlé was enrolled in college in Munich. Being nothing but a prankster he had to terminate his studies. To save his family from this embarrassment he, 19 at the time, was sent to the United States. There he quickly learned to stand on his own two feet, taking on any job he could find. He worked as farmhand in Texas, apothecary, dishwasher, translator for the German Western Post in St. Louis, and as journalist in San Francisco. In 1898 he found himself as part of the US Army reporting on the battle of Signal Hill in Cuba. This stage of his life was documented in his novel Der deutsche Lausbub in Amerika which translates as "The German prankster in America".

Having returned to Germany and subsequently trying to escape a failed relationship with his "jewel" as he called her, he joined the French Foreign Legion. Signing his 5-year contract on October 6, 1905, he became Legionnaire 17889. After 2 years, he was able to escape and eventually published his experience as In the Foreign Legion (1910).

== Literature ==
- Erwin Rosen: In the Foreign Legion (1910) (Download)
- Erwin Carlé: Der deutsche Lausbub in Amerika (Download)
- Other books by Erwin Rosen
- "Download". Spiegel-Gutenberg Archive. Archived from the original on June 8, 2011. In German
