= Carla Emery =

American writer and encyclopedist (1939–2005)

- Emery and her book, Encyclopedia of Country Living
- Born: Carlotta Louise Harshbarger; January 19, 1939; Los Angeles, California, U.S.
- Died: October 11, 2005 (aged 66); Odessa, Texas, U.S.
- Education: Roosevelt University (B.A.); Columbia University (M.A.)
- Occupation: Writer
- Spouse(s): Mike Emery (div. 1985) Donald DeLong (m. 2000)
- Children: 7
- Website: Official website (2005 archive)

Carlotta Louise Harshbarger Emery DeLong (January 19, 1939, Los Angeles – October 11, 2005, Odessa) was an American writer and encyclopedist. She is best known for authoring the Encyclopedia of Country Living, known until its 9th edition as The Old-Fashioned Recipe Book. Emery was a proponent of organic farming and the "back-to-the-land movement", and expressed support for sustainable agriculture as technology continued to advance.

== Early life and education ==
Emery was born in Los Angeles to Carl Harshbarger, who hailed from a Quaker father and Amish mother, and his wife Ferne, a schoolteacher. The couple had moved to California in search of employment after being displaced from their home in Washington state by a crop failure. In Los Angeles, her father worked as a chauffeur for Dorothy Lamour before the family moved north to Oregon, where he worked as a logger. He was injured by a falling tree and was unable to work the winter. He later found a job at a shipyard in Seattle before raising enough money to buy a ranch in Montana. They lived in a rural area near Bozeman and Clyde Park, where her school had eight children in eight grades. An only child other than an older half-brother who lived with his other relatives, Emery had a happy but lonely upbringing.

Emery spent three years at University of Illinois, Chicago on a pre-med track before transferring to Roosevelt University, where she earned her bachelor's in political science with a minor in history. This was followed by a master's program at Columbia University in Chinese, with a focus on Red China. She also studied at the Taipei Language Institute in Taiwan. While at Columbia, she met Michael Emery, a PhD psychology student who had been raised on a farm in Idaho. After college, they married and purchased three acres of land in Kendrick, Idaho, the town where Mike grew up. He worked as a clinical psychologist for several years.

== Career ==
In 1970, Emery was gifted a subscription to Organic Gardening magazine by her mother-in-law. She noticed how many readers who wrote in wanted to raise their own food but didn't know where to begin; this gave her the idea to write what would become the Old-Fashioned Recipe Book. She submitted an advertisement to the magazine in November 1970, believing that, in the two months it would take for the ad to be published, she would be able to write the guide she had in mind. By the end of two months, however, she had received $3.50 from 200 people, and had only the title and table of contents written. The money had already been spent on supporting her household, so she was unable to refund anyone. She wrote to the subscribers asking them for two more months, at which point she sent them a progress report. A year passed and, spurred in part by angry letters, decided to send out the book in chapters as she finished writing. The first "newsletter" contained the first three chapters, and the final section was mailed in February 1974. To fund the book's manufacturing, she continued to place ads in Organic Gardening, raising the price incrementally in the four years before its completion. By 1974, she had received more than 800 orders, and only six people had asked for their money back.

The first seven editions of The Old-Fashioned Recipe Book were produced on a mimeograph and bound with plastic-coated copper wire. Neighbors donated their time to help operate the mimeograph and, at one point, what she referred to as the Living Room Mimeographer was the third largest employer in Kendrick. The very first edition was printed on construction paper, with each chapter marked by a different color paper. Longtime subscribers would sometimes send back tips, recipes, suggestions, and edits, and the book "became sort of a cooperative effort" between her, her neighbors, and her readers. In addition to continuing to run ads, Emery began promoting her book by attending local craft shows and fairs. Early on, she was traveling five days out of the week, following festivals around the country to make enough money to support her family. She began to get sick from lack of sleep and decided to travel for three weeks at a time instead, so she was still able to spend time with her family. She also realized that her sales and interview requests would increase if she notified media ahead of time if she was coming to town. From May 1974 to May 1994, she brought her children with her on every tour regardless of length.

As her success grew, Emery received an increasing number of letters from people asking to visit, which gave her the idea of starting a school where people of all ages, including locals, could get hands-on experience doing many of the things outlined in her book, and more. The Emerys purchased nearly 400 acres of land in Kendrick, primarily in Nez Perce County, and began building. While they did not encounter any major issues with Nez Perce County, they did so with Latah County, where three acres of their land fell. They failed to receive permission to charge visitors tuition. In total, the project cost around $200,000 and had no way to produce income. The School of Country Living opened on July 1, 1975 but was destroyed just over a year later on August 2, 1976, when flash floods caused a mudslide that killed more than one hundred animals and severely damaged the School's buildings. They chose not to attempt to rebuild.

Around this time, she hired someone in public relations to book television appearances for her, including for Ralph Story's show, The Mike Douglas Show, Johnny Carson's The Tonight Show, and Good Morning America. On Phil Donahue's show, she demonstrated goat milking. By 1976, she had sold 88,000 copies of her book, around 45,000 of which were mimeographed. That year, Emery sold the rights to her book for $115,000 to Bantam Books, who published the seventh edition in 1977, the first of her books to be published commercially, this time with the tagline Encyclopedia of Country Living. It was the fastest-selling large paperback in Bantam's history up to that point. She then went on a three-month, 93-city promotion tour for the edition.

Prior to their divorce in 1985, the Emerys had seven children: Dolly, Daniel, Rebecca, Luke, Sara, Jacob, and Esther. Bantam had let her book go out of print by the latter half of the 1980s. She still received letters from people who wanted to buy copies, so she began producing the eighth edition herself, this time with a copying machine.

In 1994, after a few years out of the public eye, she went on a 9-month book tour. In November 1997, she started a newsletter called Truthquest and in 1998 published her second book, Secret, Don't Tell: The Encyclopedia of Hypnotism, a guide to "modern and ancient mind-control technologies." On the book's website, she claimed to have been a victim of unethical hypnosis. The book was also released on audio tape. Her Encyclopedia experienced newfound popularity in 1999 as Y2K approached and anxiety about food shortages increased. In 2000, she married Don DeLong and settled in San Simon, Arizona. After Emery's death, her widower, Donald DeLong, took charge of selling the remaining stock of Secret Don't Tell.

On October 11, 2005, Emery died in Odessa, Texas while on tour. An obituary posted to her website in the following days attributed her death to complications due to low blood pressure. By 2005, more than 600,000 copies of her book had been sold. By the 50th anniversary edition release in 2019, that number had surpassed one million.

== Books ==
Date	Title	Edition	Publisher	Notes	ISBN	Ref
1971-1974	The Old Fashioned Recipe Book	1st	Self-published	Produced on a mimeograph; released in batches to subscribers	-	
March 1974	The Old Fashioned Recipe Book	2nd	Self-published	Produced on a mimeograph	-	
May 1974	The Old Fashioned Recipe Book	3rd	Self-published	Produced on a mimeograph	-	
May 1974	The Old Fashioned Recipe Book	4th	Self-published	Produced on a mimeograph	-	
May 1974	The Old Fashioned Recipe Book	5th	Self-published	Produced on a mimeograph	-	
January 1975	The Old Fashioned Recipe Book	6th	Self-published	Produced on a mimeograph	-	
November 1976	The Old Fashioned Recipe Book	Updated 6th	Self-published	Produced on a mimeograph	-	
March 1977	The Old Fashioned Recipe Book	7th	Self-published	Produced on a mimeograph	-	
November 1977	The Old Fashioned Recipe Book	Updated 7th	Bantam Books		ISBN 978-0553010688	
March 1990	The Old Fashioned Recipe Book	8th	Self-published	Produced on a copy machine	-	
January 1994	The Encyclopedia of Country Living	9th	Sasquatch Books		ISBN 978-091-236-595-4	
1998	Secret, Don't Tell: The Encyclopedia of Hypnotism	1st	Acorn Hill Publishing	Softcover and Audiobook CD still being sold by her widower, Donald DeLong, and his wife, Pam DeLong	ISBN 978-096-599-303-6	
March 2003	The Encyclopedia of Country Living	Updated 9th	Sasquatch Books		ISBN 978-157-061-377-7	
2008	The Encyclopedia of Country Living	10th	Sasquatch Books	First posthumous publication	ISBN 978-157-061-553-5	
October 2012	The Encyclopedia of Country Living	40th anniversary	Sasquatch Books		ISBN 978-157-061-840-6	
December 2019	The Encyclopedia of Country Living	50th anniversary	Sasquatch Books		ISBN 978-163-217-289-1	

== See also ==
- Back-to-the-land movement
- Organic agriculture
- Self-sufficiency
- Brainwashing
- Posthypnotic Amnesia
- Project MKUltra
