= Carle Pace =

South African athlete

Carle Peter Albert Pace
- Born: 2 March 1918; Edenvale, Johannesburg
- Died: 24 July 2008 (aged 90); Port Elizabeth
- Occupations: cyclist, track sprinter and endurance athlete
- Known for: Marathon champion in 1948
- Spouse: Lois Olive Limbrick (?–1980s)
- Children: 4

Carle Peter Albert Pace (2 March 1918 – 24 July 2008) was a South African cyclist, track sprinter and endurance athlete with a 75-year career. He came 6th in the Comrades Marathon in 1947 at the age of 29 and became marathon champion in 1948. His running career lasted up until just after his 89th birthday.

== Background ==
Pace was born in Edenvale, Johannesburg to Johannes Jurie Pace and Gertruida Phillipina Pace, née Potgieter, dairy farmers on 2 March 1918. He died on 24 July 2008 in Port Elizabeth, just a few months after his 90th birthday. His ashes were scattered at the Westbourne Athletics Oval, in Port Elizabeth.

== Comrades Marathon ==
In 1947, Carl came 6th overall running for Germiston Callies Harriers with a time of 08:02:41.

He came back 2 years later at the age of 31 and finished 24th with a time of 09:59:34 obtaining him a silver. After becoming marathon champion in 1947 and cycling champion in 1946, Carl concentrated on smaller challenges until 1956, when he attempted the comrades for the 3rd time coming 37th with a time of 10:24:24.

== Other achievements ==
He concentrated on field and track events in the later half of his life, becoming a champion within veteran and masters athletics. Still to this day he holds the records for: 85–89 years 400m sprint – 2:01.6; 85–89 years 800m sprint – 5:21.0

He took up cycling in the 1940s and was at one time a Transvaal junior champion.

In his tour of duty with the South African Air Force in the war, he became inland command featherweight champ, putting flight to both Ossewabrandwag and RAF challengers, he recalled in an article with a local newspaper in 2004.

== Family ==
In 1922, Carl's father was tried for treason for his role in the miner's Rand Rebellion, but subsequently released. Carl married Lois Olive Limbrick and had two daughters and two sons, Carol, Barbara, Peter and Michael. Although getting divorced in the 1980s for personal reasons, Carl and Lois remained close friends until Carl's death.
