= Octavia Carlén =

Swedish writer

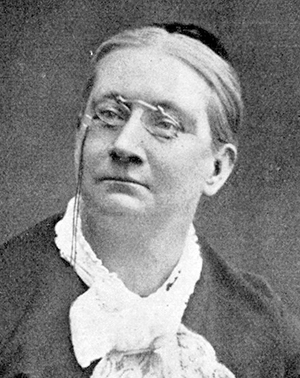
- Octavia Carlén
- Born: Maria Octavia Carlén; 22 November 1828; Skara, Sweden
- Died: 30 January 1881 (aged 52); Stockholm, Sweden
- Occupation: Writer

Maria Octavia Carlén (22 November 1828 – 30 January 1881) was a Swedish writer.

== Life ==
Octavia Carlén was born on 22 November 1828 in Skara, Sweden. She was the daughter of Carl Gabriel Carlén, an official, and his wife, Maria Carlén (née Mathesius). Carlén had two older brothers: Johan Gabriel and Richard, both became involved in literary circles. Richard's wife Emilie Flygare was also a writer. Thanks to her brothers, Carlén turned to writing at an early age. Through her father's friend and vicar, J. Stalin, Carlén developed an interest in historical productions. Her writings encompass both popular history and fictional narratives. Commentators have attempted to identify the antecedents of her writings. The oldest available information, dating back to 1857, is a four-page long homage to the duchess of Östergötland. A complimentary address to royalty, it shows her efforts to make a place for herself in the middle-class society. Her works have often been known to resemble those of Wilhelmina Stålberg. Carlén wrote for several publications such as Freja, Linnea, Norden, Svea, Vinterblommor, and Violblomman.

Her first work of fiction, Ny och nedan, poemer och noveller, was published in 1859. Two more works followed in the period 1861–1879: Fem noveller and Poemer och noveller. During this time, she also turned her attention to historical fiction. Historical attractions became a frequent subject matter in her works, and she acknowledged their importance in her writings. In 1859, Carlén published a compilation of the Royal Armoury's collections. She followed it with another collection two years later, where she described the Drottningholm Palace. Other examples include Gotland and its monuments, the Ulriksdal, Stockholm, and Tullgarn palaces, and a portrait collection from Gripsholm. In 1866, she published a travel guide for a newly opened railway line from Stockholm to Uppsala. She also wrote about her 1969 trip to Gothenburg in another publication. Carlén was also known to collaborate with other contemporary writers such as Marie Sophie Schwartz and Carl Anton Wetterbergh.

Carlén died in Stockholm, on 30 January 1881.
