= Bob Caple =

English cricketer (1939–2019)

Personal information
- Full name: Robert Graham Caple
- Born: 8 December 1939; Chiswick, Middlesex, England
- Died: 29 December 2019 (aged 80); South Africa
- Batting: Left-handed
- Bowling: Right-arm off break

Domestic team information
- Years: Team
- 1958: Marylebone Cricket Club
- 1959: Middlesex
- 1961–1967: Hampshire

Career statistics
Competition	First-class
Matches	68
Runs scored	1,581
Batting average	18.38
100s/50s	–/5
Top score	64*
Balls bowled	2,861
Wickets	34
Bowling average	36.32
5 wickets in innings	1
10 wickets in match	–
Best bowling	5/54
Catches/stumpings	32/–
- Source: Cricinfo, 6 February 2020

Robert Graham Caple (8 December 1939 — 29 December 2019) was an English first-class cricketer.

Caple was born at Chiswick in December 1939. He made his debut in first-class cricket for the Marylebone Cricket Club against Oxford University at Lord's in 1958. The following season, he made two first-class appearances for Middlesex against Oxford University and Cambridge University. Caple left Middlesex to join Hampshire in 1961, making his debut for Hampshire against Oxford University in that year. A gap of two years followed before his next appearance for Hampshire at Bournemouth in 1963, with Caple establishing himself in the Hampshire side that year. He made 65 first-class appearances for Hampshire until 1967, scoring 1,531 runs at an average of 18.22; he made five half centuries, with a highest score of 64 not out coming against Surrey in 1964. Although Caple was also a useful off break bowler, he found himself playing for Hampshire at a time when they had strong spin bowling options, limiting his bowling for Hampshire. Thus, he was limited to 28 wickets at a bowling average of 35.82; he took one five wicket haul, with figures of 5 for 54 against Oxford University in 1966.

Caple left Hampshire, alongside Geoff Keith, at the end of the 1967 season. Following the conclusion of his playing career, he became a successful cricket coach. He coached at Bedford School for 23 years, before coaching in South Africa at St. Alban's College for sixteen years. Caple died in South Africa in December 2019.
