= Almerigogna Mansion =

Coordinates: 45°32′47″N 13°43′43″E

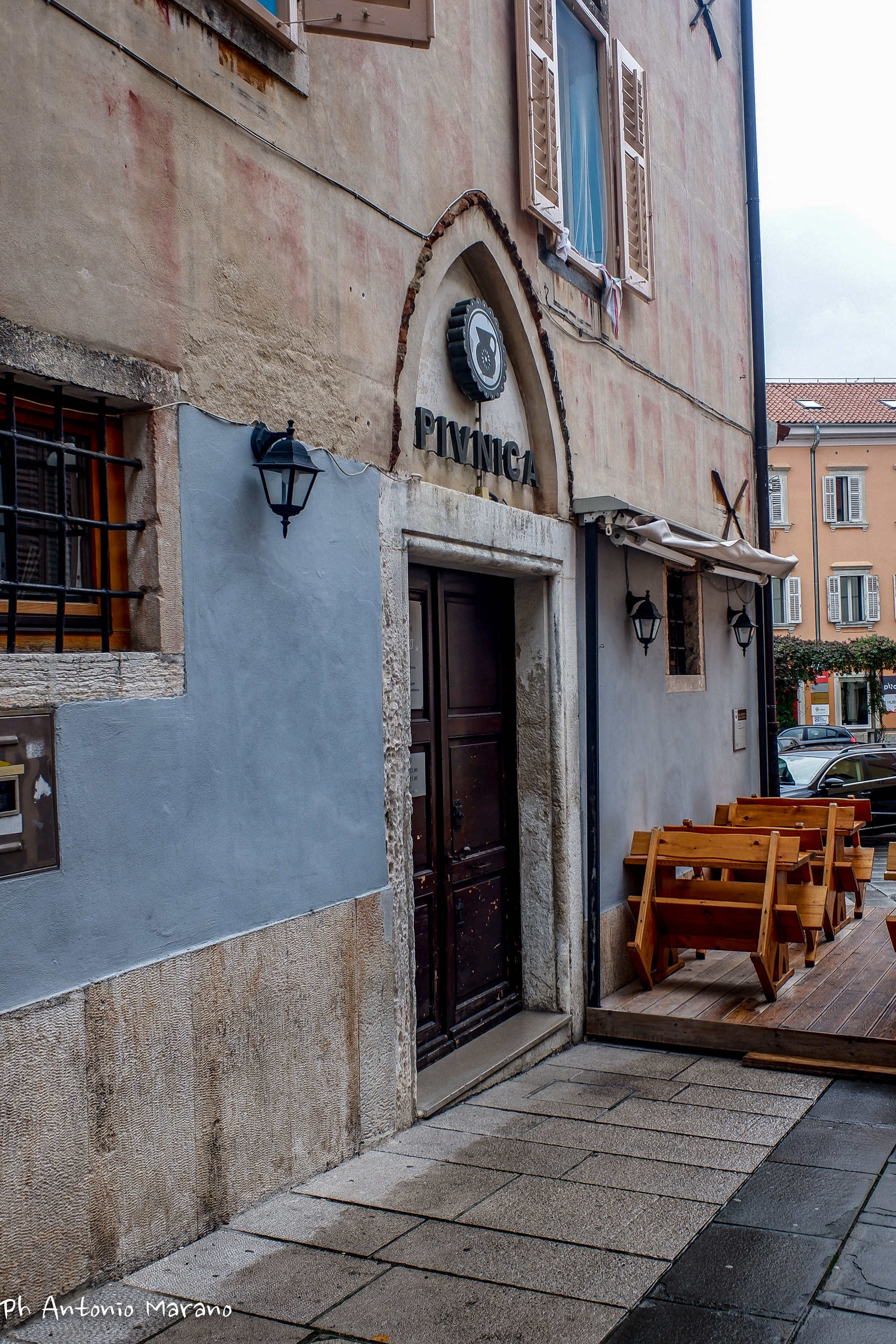
Almerigogna Mansion

Almerigogna Mansion (Slovene: palača Almerigogna; Italian: palazzo Almerigogna) is a mansion in Koper, a port town in south-western Slovenia. It is one of the most significant Gothic monuments in the town.
