= Pontus Carle =

Pontus Carle (born in 1955 in Sweden) is a contemporary artist living between Paris and Berlin.

== Biography ==
Pontus Carle was raised in Paris, where he moved with his family at the age of four.

He studied etching at the Academie Henri Goetz in Paris in 1973. He continued his education at the Beaux Arts in Paris in 1976, concentrating on lithography and painting. This is followed by a year studying etching and lithography in Malmö, Sweden. Carle lived in New York City between 1980 and 1989, where he started exhibiting his work in 1985.

Since 1991, he has lived and worked in Paris and Berlin. His work is exhibited in Europe and the United States, and is represented in numerous museums and private collections in Europe and in the United States.

== Exhibitions ==
- American Scandinavian Foundation, New York, 1983
- Opus Art Studios, Miami, 1985
- Now Gallery, New York, 1986
- Barbara Braathen and Leo Castelli, New York, (group), 1987
- Galleri Futura, Stockholm, 1988
- Galerie Marc Espinosa, Paris, 1991
- Ljungby Konsthall, Ljungby, Sweden, 1992
- Galerie Vitoux-Zylberman, Paris, 1993
- Galerie Auf Zeit, Berlin, 1993
- Kunstverein Herzattacke, Berlin, 1994
- Musee de Montelimar, Montelimar, France, 1994
- Galerie Area, Paris, France, (group), 1995
- Kunstverein Wismar, Wismar, Germany, 1997
- Galerie Auf Zeit, Berlin, 1997
- Galerie Mabel Semmler, Paris, 1998
- Haus Am Lützowplatz, Berlin, 1998
- Konsthallen i Hishult, Hishult, Sweden, 1999
- Die Alster Villa, Hamburg, 1999
- Galerie Mabel Semmler, Paris, 2000
- Galleri Svenska Bilder, Stockholm, 2001
- Galleri Astley, Uttersberg, Sweden, 2001
- Nordiska Ministerrådet, Copenhagen, Denmark, 2002
- Stadtmuseum Jena, Jena, Germany, 2002
- Stadtmuseum Speyer, Speyer, Germany, 2003
- Galleri Remi, Östersund, Sweden, 2003
- Galleri Sander, Norrköping, Sweden, 2004
- Galleri Futura, Stockholm, 2005
- Konsthallen I Pumphuset, Landskrona, Sweden, 2006
- Galleri Astley, Uttersberg, Sweden, 2006
- Ronneby Konsthall, Ronneby, Sweden, 2007
- Sörmlands Museum och Konsthall, Nyköping, Sweden, 2007
- Match Artspace, New York, 200
- Galleri Lindqvist, Arkelstorp, Sweden, 2009
- Galleri Sander, Norrköping, Sweden, 2009
- Grafiska Sällskapet, Stockholm, Sweden, 2010
- Galerie Charlot, Paris, France, 2010
- Grafik i Väst, Gothenburg, Sweden, 2011
- Galerie Charlot, Paris, France, 2012
- Karlskrona Konsthall, Karlskrona, Sweden, 2012
- Karlsruhe Artfair, Karlsruhe, Germany, 2012
- Galleri Jan Wallmark, Stockholm, Sweden, 2012
- GALERIE BORN, Berlin, Germany, 2018

== Collections (selection) ==
- Landesbibliothek, Berlin, Germany
- Sammlungen der Berlinischen Galerie, Berlin, Germany
- Sammlung der Robert Havemann Gesellschaft Gedenkebibliothek, Berlin, Germany
- Staatlische Museen, Stiftung
- Preußischer Kulturbesitz, Kupferstitchkabinett SMPKKunstbibliothek, Berlin, Germany
- Public Library, Boston, MA, USA
- Museum Schloss Burgk, Burgk, Saale, Germany
- Harvard University, Cambridge, MA, USA
- Musee Bertrand, Chateauroux, France
- Brandenburgische Kunstsammlung, Cottbus, Germany
- Meermano- Westreenanum Rijkmuseum, Den Haag, Netherlands
- Säschsische Landesbibliothek, Staats und Universitätsbibliothek, Dresden, Germany
- Staatlische Kunstsammlung, Kupferstichkabinett, Dresden, Germany
- Deutsche Bibliothek, Frankfurt am Main, Germany
- Stadt und Universitätsbibliothek, Frankfurt am Main, Germany
- Staatsbibliothek “Carl von Ossietzky”, Hamburg, Germany
- Kunst und Museumsbibliothek, Köln, Germany
- Deutsche Bücherei, Buch und Schriftmuseum, Leipzig Germany
- Ljungby Konsthall, Ljungby, Sweden
- Schiller Nationalmuseum, Deutsches Litteraturarchiv, Marbach, Germany
- Lunds Universitetsbibliotek, Lund, Sweden
- Bayerische Staatsbibliothek, München, Germany
- Lyrik Kabinett, München, Germany
- Public Library, Newark, NJ, USA
- American Scandinavian Foundation, New York, NY, USA
- Chase Manhattan Bank, New York, NY, USA
- Columbia University, Special Collection, New York, NY, USA
- Public Library, Spencer Collection, New York, NY, USA
- Germanisches Nationalmuseum, Nürnberg, Germany
- Nürnberg Institut für Moderne Kunst, Nürnberg, Germany
- Musée de Klingspor, Offenbach, Germany
- BNF, Bibliothèque Nationale, Paris, France
- Bayern Stadtsparkasse, Pfaffenhofen, Germany
- Landesbibliothek Mecklenburg Vorpommern, Schwerin, Germany
- Brown University, John Hay Library, Providence, Rhode Island, USA
- Stanford University, Stanford, CA, USA
- Würtembergische Landesbibliothek, Stuttgart, Germany
- Kungliga Biblioteket, Stockholm, Sweden
- Hochschule für angewandte Kunst, Wismar, Germany
- Kulturamt, Wismar, Germany
- Herzog August Bibliothek, Wolfenbüttel, Germany
- Museum für Gestaltung, Zurich, Switzerland
- Lilly University, Indiana, USA

== Publications ==
- 2012 - Pontus Carle. On my mind. Editions Galerie Charlot
