= Carla Padilla Ramos =

Mexican politician

- Born: 6 May 1969 (age 57); State of Mexico, Mexico
- Occupation: Deputy
- Political party: PVEM

Carla Alicia Padilla Ramos (born 6 May 1969) is a Mexican politician affiliated with the PVEM. As of 2013 she served as Deputy of the LXII Legislature of the Mexican Congress representing the State of Mexico.
