= Paula Freitas =

Coordinates: 26°12′S 50°57′W

- Municipality
- Interactive map of Paula Freitas
- Country: Brazil
- Region: Southern
- State: Paraná
- Mesoregion: Sudeste Paranaense

Population (2020)
  - Total: 5,908
- Time zone: UTC−3 (BRT)

Paula Freitas is a municipality in the state of Paraná in the Southern Region of Brazil.

The Brazilian town of Paula Freitas is home to a Geomagnetism Research Laboratory, called Geophysics Research Campus Major Edsel de Freitas Coutinho, whose goal is to study the South Atlantic Geomagnetic Anomaly. The Paula Freitas municipality is close to the center of the largest and most important of Earth's Magnetic Anomalies, which has an influence on all ionosphere, extending from the Andes Cordillera to South Africa, encompassing almost all South America. The town of Paula Freitas lies under the area where the Earth's inner Van Allen radiation belt comes closest to the Earth's surface.

This leads to an increased flux of energetic particles in this region and exposes orbiting satellites and other spacecraft to higher than usual levels of radiation. The effect is caused by the non-concentricity of the Earth and its magnetic dipole.

== See also ==
- List of municipalities in Paraná
