= Derek Carle =

Zimbabwean cricketer (born 1973)

Personal information
- Full name: Derek Graeme Carle
- Born: 12 July 1973 (age 53); Salisbury, Rhodesia
- Batting: Right-handed
- Bowling: Right-arm off break

Domestic team information
- Years: Team
- 1993/94: Mashonaland Country Districts

Career statistics
Competition	First-class
Matches	1
Runs scored	6
Batting average	6.00
100s/50s	–/–
Top score	6
Balls bowled	42
Wickets	2
Bowling average	9.50
5 wickets in innings	–
10 wickets in match	–
Best bowling	2/19
Catches/stumpings	–/–
- Source: Cricinfo, 20 October 2012

Derek Carle (born 12 July 1973) was a Zimbabwean cricketer. He was a right-handed batsman and a right-arm off-break bowler who played for Mashonaland Country Districts. He was born in Salisbury (now Harare).

Carle made a single first-class appearance for the team, in 1993-94, against Mashonaland. Batting as a tailender, Carle scored 6 runs in the only innings in which he batted, and bowled seven overs during the match, taking 2-19 in the only innings in which Mashonaland batted.
