= Carla Koplin Cohn =

First full-time secretary hired for a Major League Baseball player

- Born: Carla Koplin; January 17, 1947 (age 79); Macon, Georgia, U.S.
- Education: University of Georgia
- Known for: Personal secretary to Hank Aaron; first full-time personal assistant to a Major League Baseball player
- Spouse: Al Cohn (died 2007)
- Children: 1

Carla Koplin Cohn (born January 17, 1947) is an American former secretary who served as the personal secretary to Henry Aaron, Hall of Fame baseball player and one of the greatest players in baseball history, during his chase of Babe Ruth's home run record of 714. She was the first full-time secretary ever written into the contract of a Major League Baseball player.

== Early life and education ==
Koplin was born in 1947 to a Jewish family in Macon, Georgia. Her parents were Nora (née Coolik) and Alvin Koplin. She graduated from Miller High School for Girls and then attended the University of Georgia for two years, after which she enrolled in a secretarial school in New York City.

== Career ==
After finishing school, Koplin applied for a position with the Atlanta Braves in 1969. Dick Cecil, Vice President of the Braves, hired her to work as the assistant of the director of a new youth summer camp. She worked in an office situated in the tunnel leading to the Braves' clubhouse, which was how she met Aaron.

When Aaron hit his 600th home run and the possibility of him breaking Babe Ruth's record became inevitable, he asked Koplin to help out with his increasing mail. After a year working for both the summer camp and Aaron, with her workload becoming extraneous, he had Koplin written into his contract, making her the first full-time secretary to a baseball player.

Koplin's primary duty was to sort through Aaron's large numbers of mail; in 1973, he received approximately 900,000 letters. She organized the mail into congratulatory notes, and another pile for fans who sent baseball cards for Aaron to autograph. She sorted out hate mail and death threats, the latter of which she would report to the FBI. Koplin herself received death threats as well: "They knew I was white, Jewish, and working for a Black man." Additionally, she also scheduled his personal appearances and handled his business correspondence.

Koplin was present in the ballpark when Aaron hit his 715th career home run, passing Babe Ruth. Later on, when Aaron went to the Milwaukee Brewers, Koplin moved there with him and continued to work in the same position as she did with the Braves until Aaron's retirement. She then moved to New York City and eventually Westport, Connecticut.

== Personal life ==
Koplin married Al Cohn and had one child with him, a daughter named Jennifer, through whom she has a grandchild. Widowed in 2007, she retired to Boca Raton, Florida in 2009. Her daughter called Aaron "Uncle Henry".

She and Aaron remained close for the rest of his life. Aaron attended her wedding and also spoke at her daughter's wedding. Cohn attended all of Aaron's major events. When Aaron died in 2021, she was one of the few people allowed to attend his private funeral, gatherings at the time having been restricted due to the COVID-19 pandemic.
