= St. James's Church (Koper) =

Church in Koper, Slovenia

Coordinates: 45°32′54.23″N 13°46′20.5″E

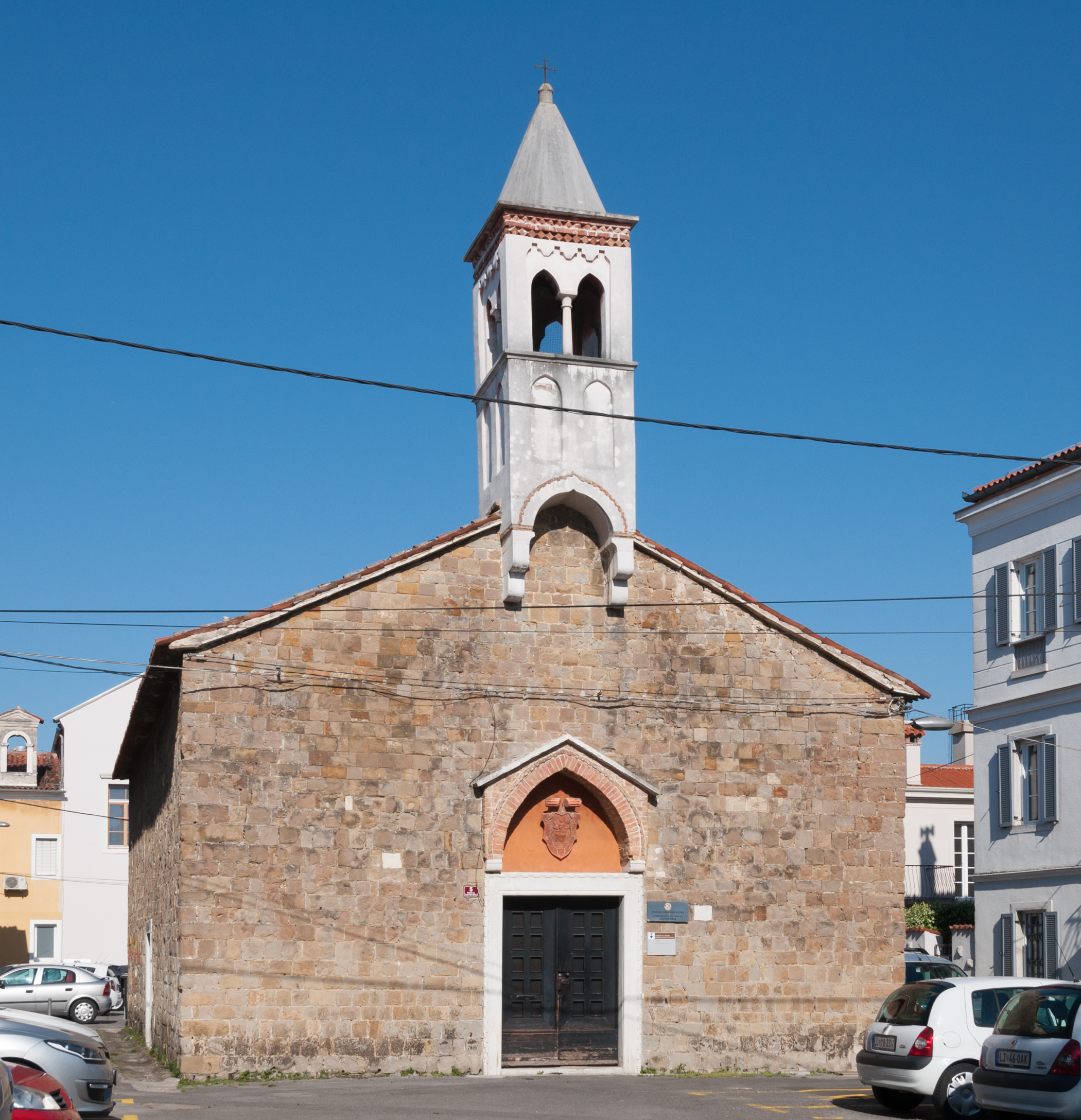
St. James's Church

St. James's Church (Slovene: Cerkev svetega Jakoba; Italian: chiesa di San Giacomo) is a church in Koper, southwestern Slovenia. It was built in the 14th century in the Venetian Gothic style.
