= Carle =

Carle or Carlé is a surname. Notable people with the name include:

- Andrea Cosima Carle, whose stage name is Maggie Mae (1960–2021), German singer
- Barbara Carle (born 1958), French-American poet, critic, translator and Italianist
- David Carle (born 1989), American ice hockey coach
- Derek Carle (born 1973), Zimbabwean cricketer
- Eric Carle (1929–2021), American designer, illustrator, and writer of children's books
- Erwin Carlé, know by the pseudonym Erwin Rosen (1876–1923), German author and journalist
- Frankie Carle (1903–2001), American pianist and bandleader
- Jerry Carle (1923–2014), American football, basketball, and baseball player and coach
- Gabrielle Carle (born 1998), Canadian soccer forward
- Gilles Carle (1928–2009), French Canadian director, screenwriter and painter
- Glenn Carle, American writer and former intelligence officer
- Jean Carle (born 1962), Canadian former civil servant, business executive, and Liberal Party operative
- Jean-Claude Carle (1948–2019), French politician
- Jean-Louis Carle (1925–1975), French cyclist
- Leo Carle (born 1980), Australian football and Futsal player
- Les Carle, the first stage name of English voice actor Ken Barrie (1933–2016)
- María Lourdes Carlé (born 2000), Argentine tennis player
- Mathieu Carle (born 1987), Canadian professional ice hockey defenceman
- Matt Carle (born 1984), American former professional ice hockey defenseman
- Nichole de Carle (born 1984), British fashion designer
- Nick Carle (born 1981), retired Australian soccer midfielder
- Pontus Carle (born 1955), contemporary artist
- Richard Carle (1871–1941), American stage and film actor
- Robin H. Carle (born 1955), American civil servant
- Shane Carle (born 1991), American baseball player
- Sophie Carle (born 1964), Luxembourgian actress and singer
- Stesha Carle (born 1984), American rower

== Other ==
- Carle Honors, American children's picture book award named for illustrator Eric Carle
- Eric Carle Museum of Picture Book Art

== See also ==
- Acosta Carlez
- Carle (given name)
- Carlee
- Carli (given name)
- Carlie
- Carlye J. Hughes
- De Carle
