= Dionigi da Palacenza Carli =

Capuchin missionary in Africa

Dionigi de Carli da Piacenza was a Capuchin missionary in Africa, in the seventeenth century.

He was one of a band of Franciscan friars of the Capuchin Reform, sent out to the Congo in 1666. One of his companions was Michele Angelo Guattini da Rhegio, who wrote an account of the voyage of the missionaries from Genoa to Lisbon and thence to Brazil, Luanda, and the Congo, that being the route the missionaries had to take to get to their destination.

== Works ==
Michele Angelo died shortly after his arrival in the Congo, leaving his manuscript in the hands of Dionigi Carli, who, on his return to Italy a few years afterwards owing to sickness, wrote an account of his own experiences in the Congo and on his homeward journey. Carli published at Rhegio in 1672 his own work together with that of Guattini under the title: Il Moro transportato in Venezia ovvero curioso raconto de' Costumi, Riti et Religione de' Populi dell' Africa, America, Asia ed Europa. A second edition appeared at Bologna in 1674. An English translation is published in Churchill, "Voyages" (London, 1704), I.

Carli gave a detailed description of the manners and customs of the Congolese, and of the doings of the missionaries. He tells how the friars died in numbers, owing to the climate, and speaks with discouragement of the peculiar difficulties of the situation. He trusts that some of the 2700 children he baptized will reach Heaven and be to his credit as a missionary in the judgment book of God. Finally he gives some account of the various cities he passed through in Portugal, Spain, and France on his way home.
