= Pietrapelosa =

Castle in the Croatian part of Istria

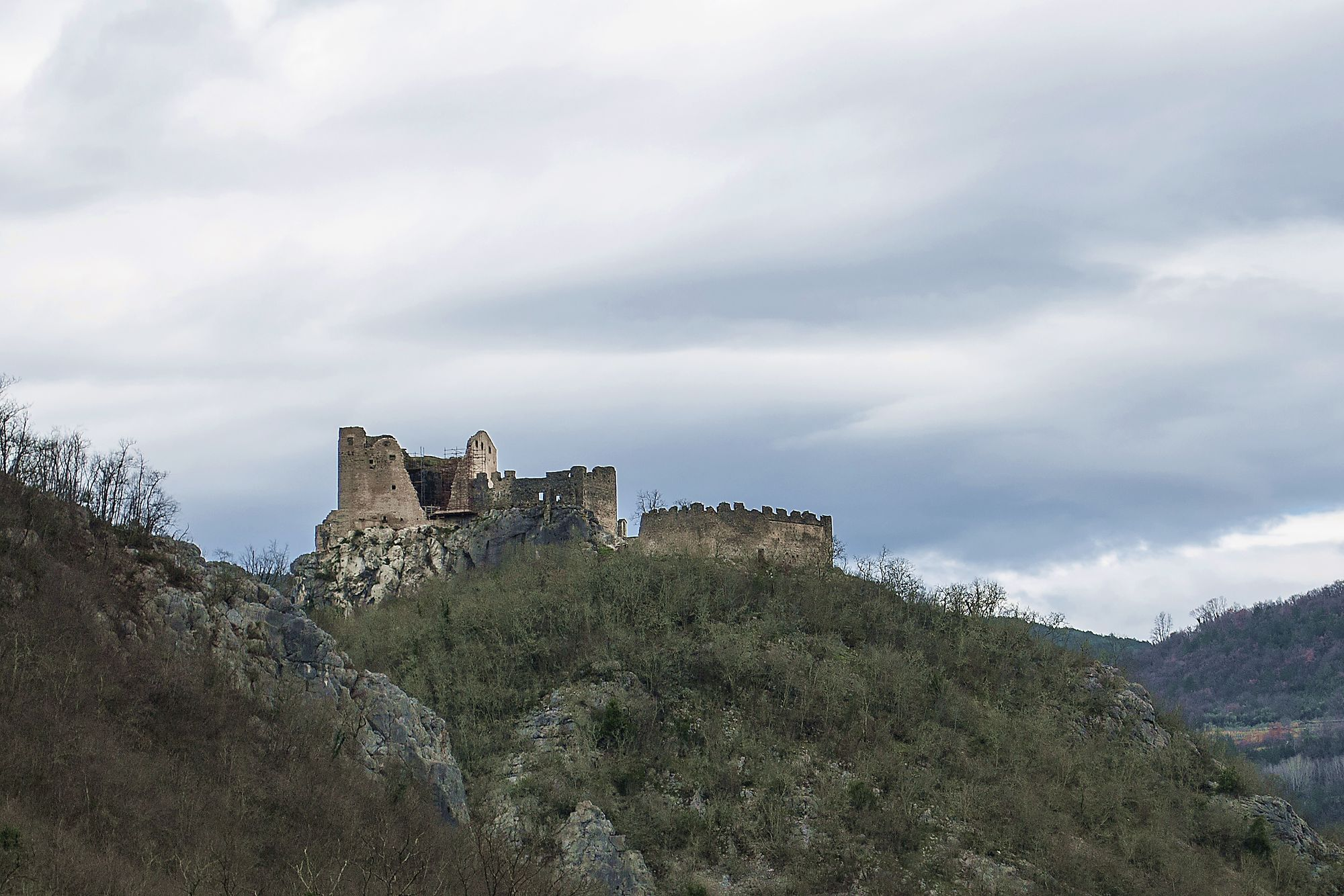
Ruins of Pietrapelosa Castle in 2014

Pietrapelosa (Croatian: Kostel, Kaštel, Kosmati grad, Kosmati Kostel, Kosmati Kaštel) is a castle in the Croatian part of Istria, now ruined. In the medieval period a family took their name from the castle. "Pietrapelosa" comes from the Italian words meaning "hairy stone" after the moss that has always grown on the walls of the castle. It is one of the best-preserved of the Istrian castles.

== History ==
Pietrapelosa is a few kilometers west of Buzet in a strategic location at the head of the Bračana valley. It is first mentioned in a document of 965 A.D. in a deed recording its gift by Rodaold, patriarch of Aquileia to the bishopric of Poreč. In the 13th century it was given to a family of German knights who assumed the name of the castle, "de Pietrapelosa". The castle was the seat of the Aquileian lieutenant governor of Istria. The Venetian commander Taddeo d'Este conquered the castle and abolished the secular rule of the patriarchs of Aquileia in 1421, with Istria being divided between the Republic of Venice and the Habsburg County of Pazin. The Venetian Council of Ten granted the castle to the nobleman Nicolò Gravisi in 1440, giving him the title if Marquis of Pietrapelosa. He renovated the castle for use as a summer residence. In 1635 a fire destroyed the interior of the castle, but it was restored and inhabited until the 18th century. The Gravis family owned the castle until the final abolition of the feudal system in 1869. They were the only aristocratic family in Koper to own such an estate.

== Building ==
The castle was surrounded by three-story walls, which are still intact. It included a main four-story polygonal watchtower, sometimes also used as a residence. There was also a house and a palace chapel of St. Mary Magdalene dating from the 12th century. The chapel is built in the classic Istrian style with one nave and a bell tower. A residential area was built on a crag beside the castle with no walls. The castle avoided destruction throughout the many wars that ravaged Istria. However, it fell into ruin after being abandoned, and has only recently been restored. From the castle there is a dramatic view of Northern Istria.
