= Carlia S. Westcott =

First licensed woman Marine Engineer

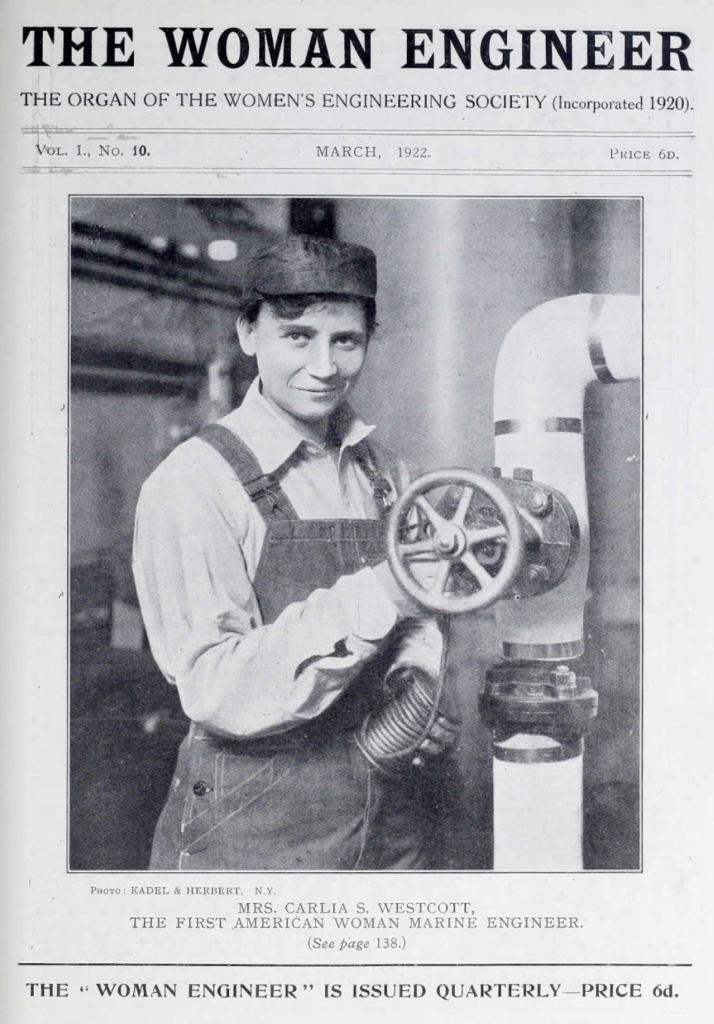
Mrs Carlia S Westcott; first woman in America to be granted a Marine Engineer license

Carlia S. Westcott was an American engineer. She was the first woman to receive a first-of-a-kind license in Marine Engineering in the United States, in December 1921. She was highlighted on the cover of The Woman Engineer after the New York Times covered her. She was from Seattle, Washington. She was married to the chief engineer of the Cary-Dan's Towing Company who worked on one of the tugboats in the Seattle region. Carlia assisted her husband on one of the vessels. There she carried out the tasks of a fireman.

Carlia Westcott took and passed the Marine Engineers' Beneficial Association, No. 38 test in Seattle, Washington. She went on to complete the U.S. Steamboat Service examination, in which she passed. "Her showing in the examination was as near perfect as it could be", confirmed the supervising inspector.
