= Carla Carli Mazzucato =

Italian painter (born 1935)

Carla Carli Mazzucato (born 2 November 1935) is a 20th-century Italian artist whose contributions to the world of contemporary art helped define the "modern expressionist" movement. Known for her unique style and bold color palette, her paintings are described by critics as “dynamic,” “graceful”, “timeless,” and have been compared to the masterworks of Chagall, Renoir, Monet and Van Gogh.

Mazzucato's art is part of numerous collections in Europe, North America and Asia. Her commissioned work, "Evening at the Opera" hangs in the Detroit Opera House and the artist's fourteen-painting contemporary interpretation of the Passion of Christ is part of the Roman Catholic Archdiocese collection installed in the church of Corpus Domini in Bolzano, Italy. Mazzucato was recognized as a leading contemporary artist by the SoHo Fine Arts Institute in New York City in 2000.

== Early life ==
Carla Carli Mazzucato was born in Appiano, a small town nestled in the Alps of northern Italy on November 2, 1935. She was the second of three children born to Anna Bella and Vigilio Carli, a local landowner who oversaw an expanse of orchards. He grew a successful business exporting apples and other fruits to Austria and Yugoslavia. Consequently, Carla spent much of her early youth surrounded by nature, accompanying her father on walks through the countryside and along the wooded timber trails of the mountains that rimmed the fertile Adige River Valley.

== World War II ==
The tranquillity of Carla’s childhood was interrupted by the onset of World War II. Situated along the Adige River which flows through the Brenner Pass in the Alps, Appiano was squarely on the primary route into Italy from Austria and Germany. Allied bombing runs frequently targeted the railroad through the pass to disrupt Nazi Germany's supply lines. At seven years of age, Carla’s days were often spent in the darkness of the bomb shelters built into the mountainsides.

Although Italy signed the armistice with the Allied Forces in 1943, Germany responded by annexing the Alto Adige region, prolonging the fighting there through 1945. With the end of the war, came a period of rebuilding, but for young Carla, it marked the end of her childhood. Her father died in 1947; her mother soon after.

Carla went to work to help support her family. She continued her studies independently and eventually went on to attend the Ca' Foscari Academy in Venice and the Università Cattolica in Milan. In 1962, she was introduced to the brother of a classmate and shortly thereafter travelled to America to make a new home with her husband, Giuseppe Mazzucato.

== New Horizons ==
Carla began her life in the United States in Chicago Heights, Illinois. There, she learned English, started a family and she began to paint. Though her early work relied more on her classical training, she was greatly influenced by the paintings of French expressionist Georges Rouault. Her own personal style evolved, and by the time she moved to the Detroit, Michigan, area in 1966, her art embraced qualities of both expressionism and impressionism.

Mazzucato’s work was first exhibited in 1969. In 1977, she opened an art gallery in Grosse Ile, Michigan, where she taught and helped to promote and exhibit the work of other artists as well as her own.

== New York and Beyond ==
By 1982, Mazzucato's work began appearing regularly in New York City. Her paintings were well received by both the public and critics alike who noted that “...this serious and talented artist has quite a range of expression in an art that is a complex of powerful forces.”

Mazzucato and her art began to travel the country. Exhibits in Dallas, Chicago and Palm Springs introduced her work to enthusiastic patrons, as she gained recognition as a leading contemporary artist. “Her art conveys an ultimate optimism in the nature of man, and her figures seem to walk towards an indefinite horizon in the hope of finding that moment of truth and peace.”

In 1990, Mazzucato’s first large-scale commission, a series of fourteen oil paintings depicting the passion of Christ, was completed for the Roman Catholic Archdiocese and installed in the Church of Corpus Domini in Bolzano, Italy.

Mazzucato travelled extensively as part of her method of artistic immersion. She journeyed through Spain and France, Poland and re-emergent Russia, painting the images and impressions that she, herself witnessed first-hand. “In all of Mazzucato’s paintings, the spirit of wonder, silence and mystery permeate the landscapes, in an eloquent symphony of sensuous forms and color. Past, present and future are wed and captured in a moment.”

Mazzucato exhibited works, born from her travels, in Bologna and Prato, Italy, in 1993 and 1996, and accepted invitations for shows in the SoHo district of New York City in 1996 and 1998. “Carla Carli Mazzucato is, first and foremost, honest with herself. Her paintings are drawn from her own perceptions of life—her impressions, uninfluenced by any socially imposed manner of thinking. She does not follow the current; hers is truly free art, light-years from any set tradition. She paints a contemporary world rich with intense colours and hues that radiate optimism. Landscapes, compositions, flowers, all born from a truth interpreted by Mazzucato’s innate talent.”

In 1999, Mazzucato’s commissioned painting, “Evening at the Opera” was unveiled in a gala event at the Opera House in Detroit, Michigan, where it remains on display.

== Later life ==
Showings of Mazzucato’s work continued into the new millennium. The Regional Society for the Arts in Appiano, Italy orchestrated a 61-painting “homecoming exhibit” attended by the artist in 2001. The Bowers Museum in Santa Ana, California, presented her works in 2005, and the Prisma Galerie in Bolzano, Italy, hosted an exhibit of new paintings by the artist in 2006.

An extensive archive of Mazzucato’s art can be found online, and various collections have been published in book form. The book, America—Celebration, published in 2011, presents 61 paintings from the artist’s America series as a tribute to the United States, the artist’s adoptive country.

A 2007 documentary film, An Artist’s Journey chronicles the life and art of Carla Carli Mazzucato, and the artist's autobiography, Seasons, was published in 2021.
