= Carla Sinopoli =

American anthropologist

Carla Sinopoli is an American anthropologist. She is director of the Maxwell Museum of Anthropology and professor of anthropology at University of New Mexico.

Sinopoli received her bachelor's degree at Binghamton University and her master's degree and PhD at University of Michigan.

She has published many works, including Approaches to Archaeological Ceramics (1991), Pots and Palaces: The Earthenware ceramics of the Noblemen's Quarter of Vijayanagara (1993), Ancient India in Its Wider World (2012), and Hyecho’s Journey: The World of Buddhism (2018).
