= Carli Mansion =

Mansion in Koper, Slovenia

Coordinates: 45°32′46.72″N 13°43′44.45″E

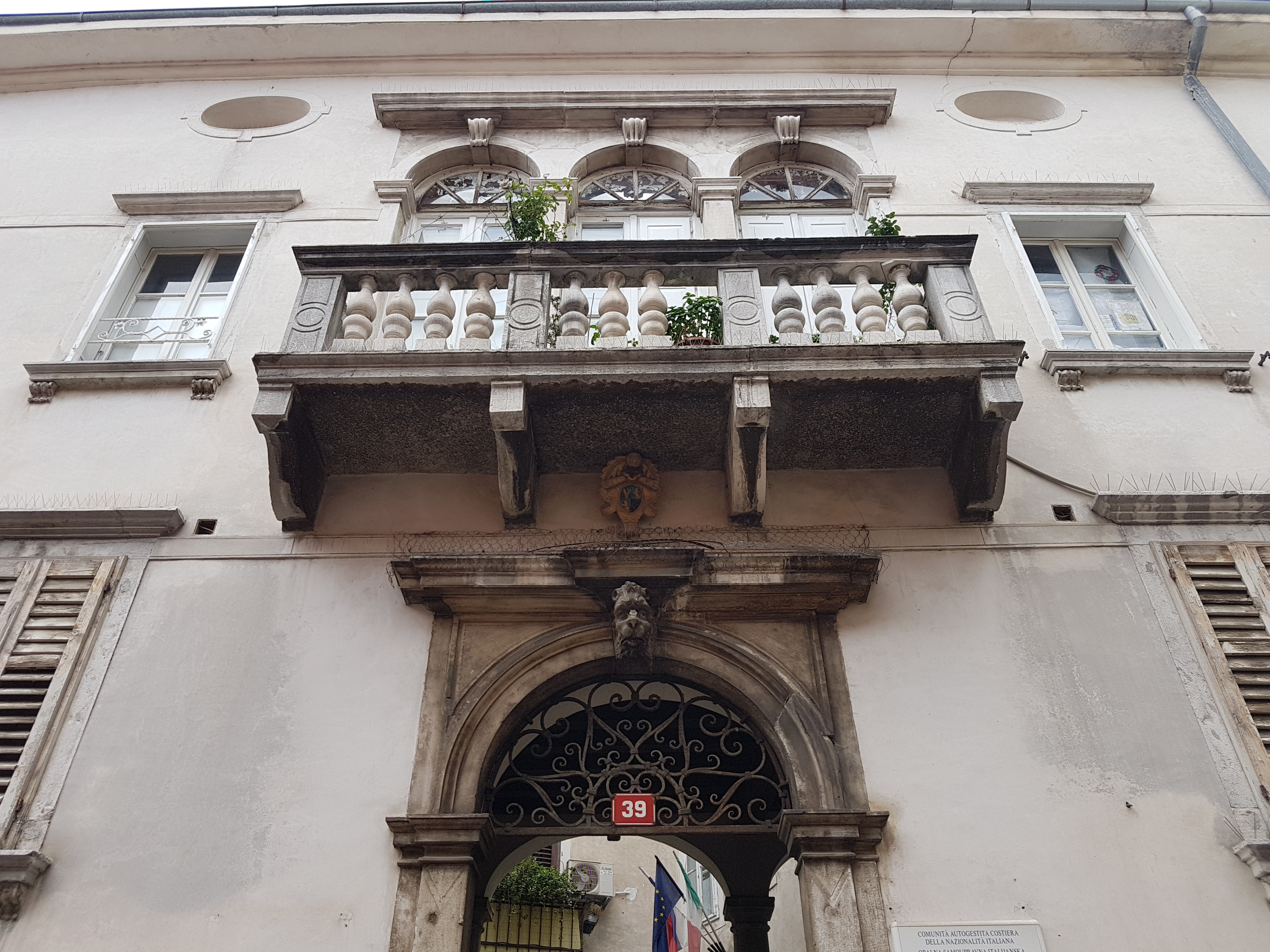
Carli Mansion

The Carli Mansion (Slovene: palača Carli; Italian: palazzo Carli) is a mansion in Koper, a port town in southwestern Slovenia. It is named after the family of the historian and encyclopedist Gian Rinaldo Carli, who was born in it in 1720. It is an example of the Baroque architecture, with a balcony in the piano nobile, decorated with a three-mullioned window. Its inner court, decorated with frescoes, has a fountain from 1418.
