= Politics of Abruzzo =

Regional Italian politics

The politics of Abruzzo, a region of Italy, takes place in the framework of an "anomalous presidential" representative democracy or prime-ministerial system with an executive presidency, whereby the President of Regional Government is the head of government, and of a pluriform multi-party system. Executive power is exercised by the Regional Government. Legislative power is vested in the Regional Council.

== Executive branch ==
The Regional Government (Giunta Regionale) is presided by the President of the Region (Presidente della Regione), who is elected for a five-year term, and is composed by the President and the Ministers (Assessori), who are currently 8, including a Vice President (Vicepresidente) and an undersecretary (Sottosegretario).

=== List of presidents ===
Elected by the Regional Council (1970–1995)

	Name	Term of office		Political party	Legislature
1	Ugo Crescenzi	3 September 1970	23 March 1972	DC	I (1970)
2	Giustino De Cecco	23 March 1972	16 July 1973	DC	I (1970)
(1)	Ugo Crescenzi	16 July 1973	31 May 1974	DC	I (1970)
(2)	Giustino De Cecco	31 May 1974	8 October 1975	DC	I (1970)
3	Felice Spadaccini	8 October 1975	1 March 1977	DC	II (1975)
4	Romeo Riciuti	1 March 1977	8 October 1980	DC	II (1975)
4	Romeo Riciuti	8 October 1980	30 November 1981	DC	III (1980)
5	Anna Nena D'Antonio	30 November 1981	13 May 1983	DC	III (1980)
(3)	Felice Spadaccini	13 May 1983	1 October 1985	DC	III (1980)
6	Emilio Mattucci	1 October 1985	1 August 1990	DC	IV (1985)
7	Rocco Salini	1 August 1990	13 October 1992	DC	V (1990)
8	Vincenzo Del Colle	13 October 1992	29 May 1995	DC	V (1990)

Directly-elected presidents (since 1995)

N.	Portrait	President	Term of office		Tenure (Years and days)	Party	Composition	Legislature
9		Antonio Falconio (1938–2021)	29 May 1995	18 May 2000	4 years, 355 days	Italian People's Party	PDS–PRC–PPI–PdD–FdV	VI (1995)
10		Giovanni Pace (1933–2018)	18 May 2000	22 April 2005	4 years, 339 days	National Alliance	FI–AN–CDC–CDU	VII (2000)
11		Ottaviano Del Turco (1944–2024)	22 April 2005	13 July 2008 (Note: Resigned after a corruption scandal. His deputy Enrico Paolini (PD) held the office till a new regional election was called.)	3 years, 82 days	Italian Democratic Socialists/ Democratic Party	DS–DL–SDI–PRC–UDEUR–PdCI–FdV	VIII (2005)
12		Giovanni Chiodi (1961– )	3 January 2009	10 June 2014	5 years, 158 days	The People of Freedom	PdL–MpA	IX (2008)
13		Luciano D'Alfonso (1965– )	10 June 2014	10 August 2018 (Note: Resigned after being elected senator in the national general election. His deputy Giovanni Lolli (PD) held the office till a new regional election was called.)	4 years, 61 days	Democratic Party	PD–CD–SEL–IdV	X (2014)
12		Marco Marsilio (1968– )	23 February 2019	10 April 2024	7 years, 186 days	Brothers of Italy	Lega–FI–FdI–AP–UDC	XI (2019)
12		Marco Marsilio (1968– )	10 April 2024	Incumbent	7 years, 186 days	Brothers of Italy	FdI–FI–Lega–NM	XII (2024)

== Legislative branch ==
The Regional Council of Abruzzo (Consiglio Regionale dell'Abruzzo) is composed of 40 members. 32 councillors are elected in provincial constituencies by proportional representation using the largest remainder method with a Droop quota and open lists, while 8 councillors (elected in bloc) come from a "regional list", including the President-elect. One seat is reserved for the candidate who comes second. If a coalition wins more than 50% of the total seats in the council with PR, only 4 candidates from the regional list will be chosen and the number of those elected in provincial constituencies will be 36. If the winning coalition receives less than 40% of votes, special seats are added to the council to ensure a large majority for the President's coalition.

The council is elected for a five-year term, but, if the President suffers a vote of no confidence, resigns or dies, under the simul stabunt, simul cadent clause introduced in 1999 (literally they will stand together or they will fall together), also the council is dissolved and a snap election is called.

=== Current composition ===
The Regional Council of Abruzzo is composed by the following political groups:

Party	Seats	Status
Brothers of Italy (FdI)	9 / 31	In government
Democratic Party (PD)	6 / 31	In opposition
Forza Italia (FI)	4 / 31	In government
Lega	2 / 31	In government
Five Star Movement (M5S)	2 / 31	In opposition
Marsilio for President (MP)	2 / 31	In government
Abruzzo Together (AI)	3 / 31	In opposition
Greens and Left Alliance (AVS)	1 / 31	In opposition
Action (A) (Note: Elected within the Centre-left coalition then switched to support the Centre-right government.)	1 / 31	External support
Us Moderates (NM)	1 / 31	External support

By coalition:

Party	Seats	Status
Centre-right coalition	18 / 31	Government
Centre-left coalition	13 / 31	Opposition

== Local government ==
=== Provinces ===
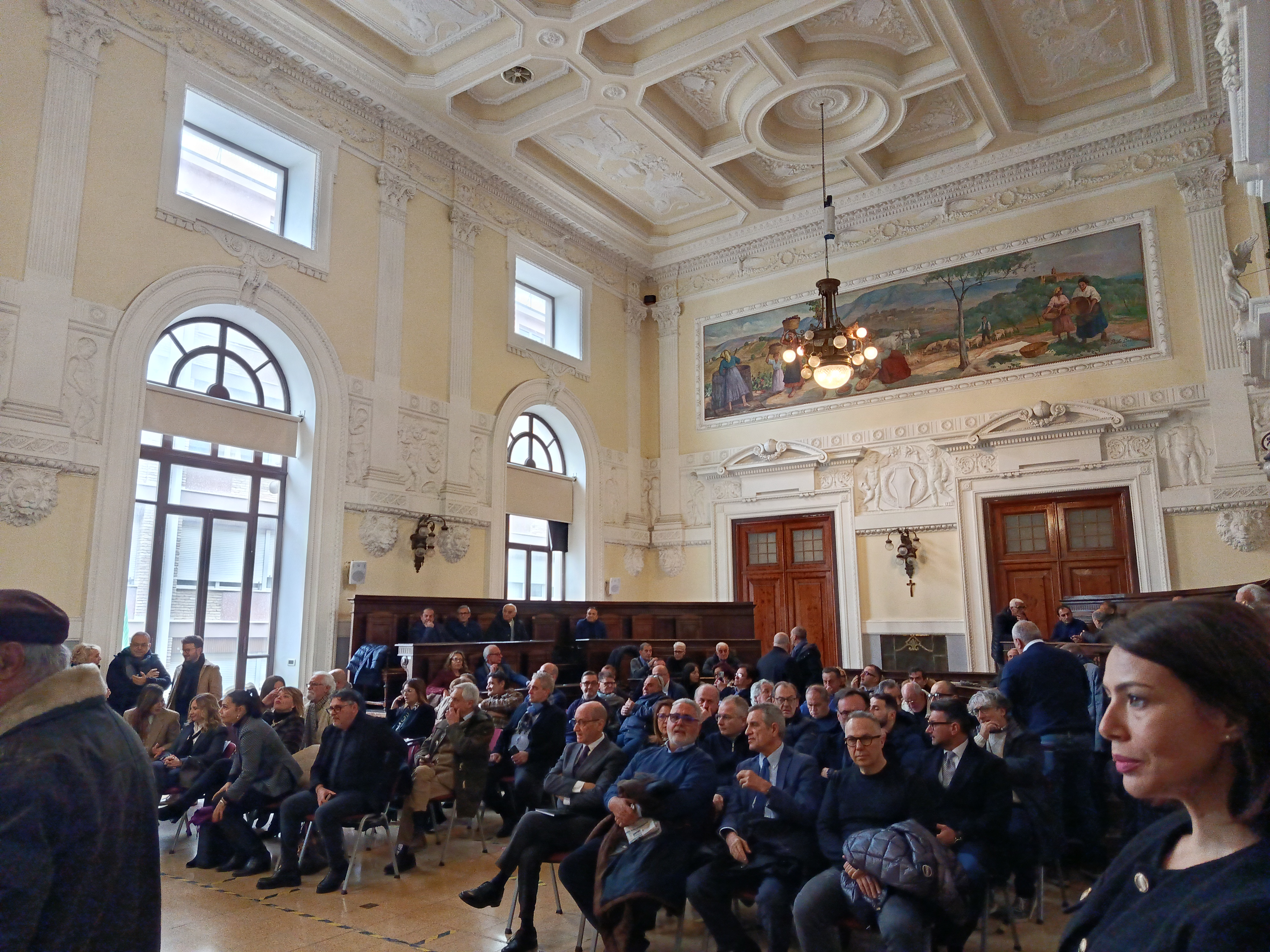
Council room of the Province of Chieti

Province	Inhabitants	President	Party	Election
Chieti	385,917	Francesco Menna	Democratic Party	2021
L'Aquila	299,135	Angelo Caruso	Independent (centre-right)	2017
Pescara	319,085	Giorgio De Luca	Forza Italia	2026
Teramo	308,219	Camillo D'Angelo	Independent (centre-left)	2023

=== Municipalities ===
Provincial capitals

Municipality	Inhabitants	Mayor	Party	Election
Chieti	50,694	Giovanni Legnini	Democratic Party	2026
L'Aquila	69,327	Pierluigi Biondi	Brothers of Italy	2017
Pescara	119,365	Carlo Masci	Forza Italia	2019
Teramo	54,361	Gianguido D'Alberto	Independent (centre-left)	2018

== Parties and elections ==
=== Latest regional election ===
The latest regional election was held on 10 March 2024. Incumbent president Marco Marsilio of Brothers of Italy was re-elected and his party was the most voted one.

10 March 2024 Abruzzo regional election results
Candidates	Votes	%	Seats	Parties	Votes	%	Seats
Marco Marsilio	326,660	53.50	1	Brothers of Italy	139,578	24.10	8
Marco Marsilio	326,660	53.50	1	Forza Italia	77,841	13.44	4
Marco Marsilio	326,660	53.50	1	League	43,816	7.56	2
Marco Marsilio	326,660	53.50	1	Marsilio for President	33,102	5.72	2
Marco Marsilio	326,660	53.50	1	Us Moderates	15,516	2.68	1
Marco Marsilio	326,660	53.50	1	Union of the Centre–Christian Democracy	6,784	1.17	–
Marco Marsilio	326,660	53.50	1	Total	316,637	54.67	17
Luciano D'Amico	284,748	46.50	1	Democratic Party	117,497	20.29	6
Luciano D'Amico	284,748	46.50	1	Abruzzo Together	44,353	7.66	2
Luciano D'Amico	284,748	46.50	1	Five Star Movement	40,629	7.01	2
Luciano D'Amico	284,748	46.50	1	Action–Socialists Populars Reformists	23,156	4.00	1
Luciano D'Amico	284,748	46.50	1	Greens and Left Alliance	20,655	3.57	1
Luciano D'Amico	284,748	46.50	1	Reformists and Civics	16,275	2.81	–
Luciano D'Amico	284,748	46.50	1	Total	262,565	45.33	12
Invalid votes	18,197	–					
Total candidates	612,408	100.00	2	Total parties	579,202	100.00	29
Registered voters	1,208,207	51.19					
Source: Ministry of the Interior – Results
