= Elections in Abruzzo =

Italian regional elections

This page gathers the results of elections in Abruzzo.

== Regional elections ==
=== Latest regional election ===
The latest regional election was held on 10 March 2024. Incumbent president Marco Marsilio of Brothers of Italy was re-elected and his party was the most voted one.

10 March 2024 Abruzzo regional election results
Candidates	Votes	%	Seats	Parties	Votes	%	Seats
Marco Marsilio	326,660	53.50	1	Brothers of Italy	139,578	24.10	8
Marco Marsilio	326,660	53.50	1	Forza Italia	77,841	13.44	4
Marco Marsilio	326,660	53.50	1	League	43,816	7.56	2
Marco Marsilio	326,660	53.50	1	Marsilio for President	33,102	5.72	2
Marco Marsilio	326,660	53.50	1	Us Moderates	15,516	2.68	1
Marco Marsilio	326,660	53.50	1	Union of the Centre–Christian Democracy	6,784	1.17	–
Marco Marsilio	326,660	53.50	1	Total	316,637	54.67	17
Luciano D'Amico	284,748	46.50	1	Democratic Party	117,497	20.29	6
Luciano D'Amico	284,748	46.50	1	Abruzzo Together	44,353	7.66	2
Luciano D'Amico	284,748	46.50	1	Five Star Movement	40,629	7.01	2
Luciano D'Amico	284,748	46.50	1	Action–Socialists Populars Reformists	23,156	4.00	1
Luciano D'Amico	284,748	46.50	1	Greens and Left Alliance	20,655	3.57	1
Luciano D'Amico	284,748	46.50	1	Reformists and Civics	16,275	2.81	–
Luciano D'Amico	284,748	46.50	1	Total	262,565	45.33	12
Invalid votes	18,197	–					
Total candidates	612,408	100.00	2	Total parties	579,202	100.00	29
Registered voters	1,208,207	51.19					
Source: Ministry of the Interior – Results

=== List of previous regional elections ===
- 1970 Abruzzo regional election
- 1975 Abruzzo regional election
- 1980 Abruzzo regional election
- 1985 Abruzzo regional election
- 1990 Abruzzo regional election
- 1995 Abruzzo regional election
- 2000 Abruzzo regional election
- 2005 Abruzzo regional election
- 2008 Abruzzo regional election
- 2014 Abruzzo regional election
- 2019 Abruzzo regional election
