= List of presidents of Abruzzo =

This is the list of presidents of Abruzzo since 1970.

Elected by the Regional Council (1970–1995)

	Name	Term of office		Political party	Legislature
1	Ugo Crescenzi	3 September 1970	23 March 1972	DC	I (1970)
2	Giustino De Cecco	23 March 1972	16 July 1973	DC	I (1970)
(1)	Ugo Crescenzi	16 July 1973	31 May 1974	DC	I (1970)
(2)	Giustino De Cecco	31 May 1974	8 October 1975	DC	I (1970)
3	Felice Spadaccini	8 October 1975	1 March 1977	DC	II (1975)
4	Romeo Riciuti	1 March 1977	8 October 1980	DC	II (1975)
4	Romeo Riciuti	8 October 1980	30 November 1981	DC	III (1980)
5	Anna Nena D'Antonio	30 November 1981	13 May 1983	DC	III (1980)
(3)	Felice Spadaccini	13 May 1983	1 October 1985	DC	III (1980)
6	Emilio Mattucci	1 October 1985	1 August 1990	DC	IV (1985)
7	Rocco Salini	1 August 1990	13 October 1992	DC	V (1990)
8	Vincenzo Del Colle	13 October 1992	29 May 1995	DC	V (1990)

Directly-elected presidents (since 1995)

N.	Portrait	President	Term of office		Tenure (Years and days)	Party	Composition	Legislature
9		Antonio Falconio (1938–2021)	29 May 1995	18 May 2000	4 years, 355 days	Italian People's Party	PDS–PRC–PPI–PdD–FdV	VI (1995)
10		Giovanni Pace (1933–2018)	18 May 2000	22 April 2005	4 years, 339 days	National Alliance	FI–AN–CDC–CDU	VII (2000)
11		Ottaviano Del Turco (1944–2024)	22 April 2005	13 July 2008 (Note: Resigned after a corruption scandal. His deputy Enrico Paolini (PD) held the office till a new regional election was called.)	3 years, 82 days	Italian Democratic Socialists/ Democratic Party	DS–DL–SDI–PRC–UDEUR–PdCI–FdV	VIII (2005)
12		Giovanni Chiodi (1961– )	3 January 2009	10 June 2014	5 years, 158 days	The People of Freedom	PdL–MpA	IX (2008)
13		Luciano D'Alfonso (1965– )	10 June 2014	10 August 2018 (Note: Resigned after being elected senator in the national general election. His deputy Giovanni Lolli (PD) held the office till a new regional election was called.)	4 years, 61 days	Democratic Party	PD–CD–SEL–IdV	X (2014)
12		Marco Marsilio (1968– )	23 February 2019	10 April 2024	7 years, 200 days	Brothers of Italy	Lega–FI–FdI–AP–UDC	XI (2019)
12		Marco Marsilio (1968– )	10 April 2024	Incumbent	7 years, 200 days	Brothers of Italy	FdI–FI–Lega–NM	XII (2024)
