= Regional Council of Abruzzo =

Legislative organ of Abruzzo, Italy

- 12th Legislature

Type
- Type: Regional council Unicameral
- Established: 6 July 1970

Leadership
- President: Lorenzo Sospiri, FI since 12 March 2019

Structure
- Seats: 31
- Political groups: Government (19): FdI (9); FI (4); Lega (2); MP (2); A (1); NM (1); Opposition (12): PD (6); M5S (2); AI (3); AVS (1)
- Length of term: 5 years

Elections
- Voting system: Party-list semi-proportional representation with majority bonus D'Hondt method
- Last election: 10 March 2024
- Next election: No later than 11 March 2029

Meeting place
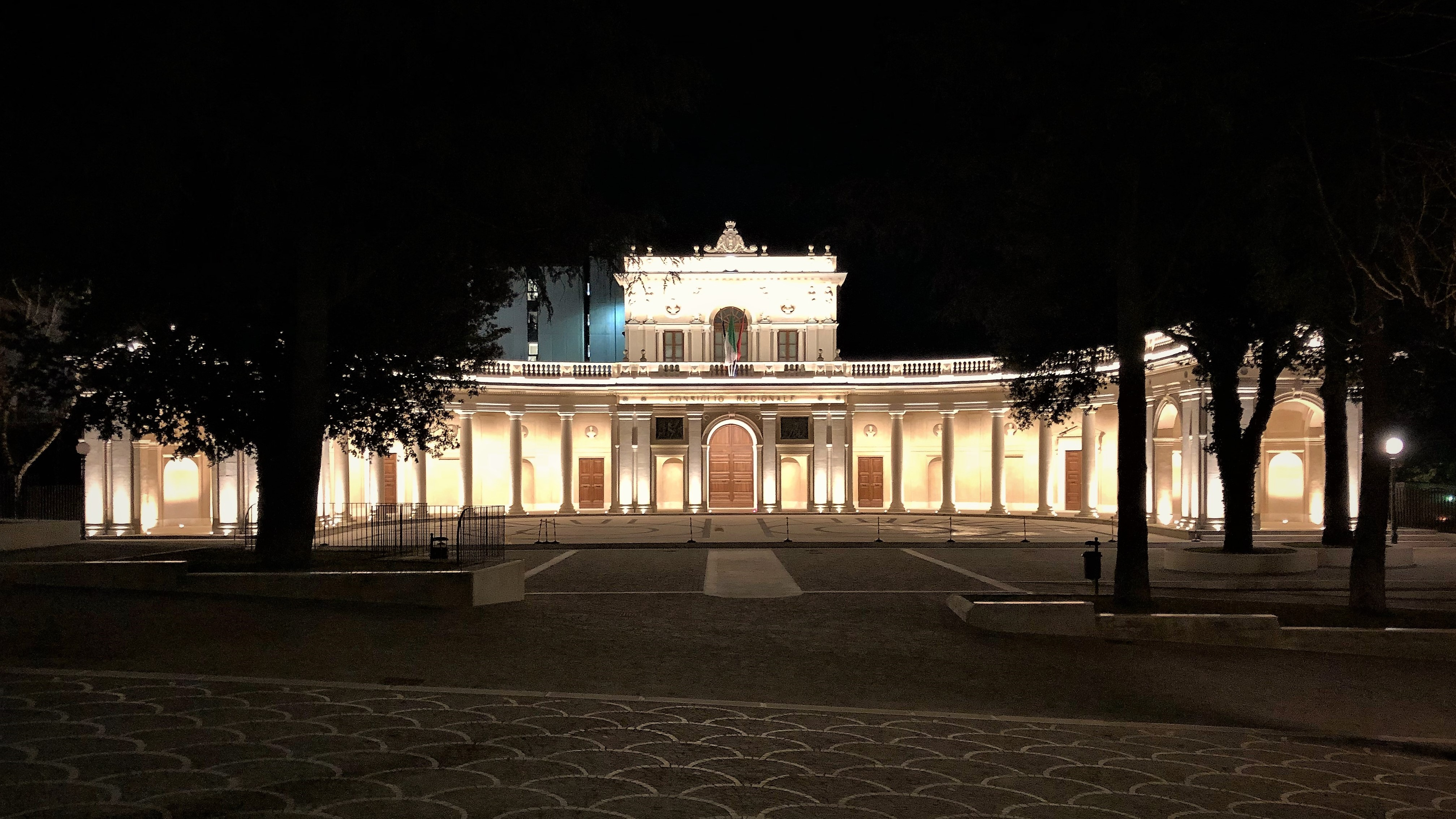
- Palazzo dell'Emiciclo, L'Aquila

Website
- Official website

The Regional Council of Abruzzo (Consiglio Regionale dell'Abruzzo) is the legislative assembly of Abruzzo.

It was first elected in 1970, when the ordinary regions were instituted, on the basis of the Constitution of Italy of 1948.

== Composition ==
The Regional Council of Abruzzo was originally composed of 40 regional councillors. The number of regional councillors increased to 43 in the 2000 regional election and, subsequently, to 45 in the 2008 regional election.

The Council is elected for a five-year term, but, if the President suffers a vote of no confidence, resigns or dies, under the simul stabunt vel simul cadent clause (introduced in 1999), also the Council will be dissolved and there will be a snap election.

Following the decree-law n. 138 of 13 August 2011 the number of regional councillors was reduced to 30, with an additional seat reserved for the President of the Region.

=== Political groups (2024–2029) ===
The Regional Council of Abruzzo is composed by the following political groups:

| Party | Seats | Status |
|---|---|---|
| Brothers of Italy (FdI) | 9 / 31 | In government |
| Democratic Party (PD) | 6 / 31 | In opposition |
| Forza Italia (FI) | 4 / 31 | In government |
| Lega | 2 / 31 | In government |
| Five Star Movement (M5S) | 2 / 31 | In opposition |
| Marsilio for President (MP) | 2 / 31 | In government |
| Abruzzo Together (AI) | 3 / 31 | In opposition |
| Greens and Left Alliance (AVS) | 1 / 31 | In opposition |
| Action (A) (Note: Elected within the Centre-left coalition then switched to support the Centre-right government.) | 1 / 31 | External support |
| Us Moderates (NM) | 1 / 31 | External support |

By coalition:

| Party | Seats | Status |
|---|---|---|
| Centre-right coalition | 18 / 31 | Government |
| Centre-left coalition | 13 / 31 | Opposition |

=== Historical composition ===
| Election | DC | PCI | PSI | PLI | PRI | PSDI | MSI | Others | Total |
|---|---|---|---|---|---|---|---|---|---|
| 7 June 1970 | 20 | 10 | 3 | 1 | 1 | 2 | 2 | 1 | 40 |
| 15 June 1975 | 18 | 13 | 4 | 0 | 1 | 2 | 2 | 0 | 40 |
| 8 June 1980 | 20 | 12 | 4 | 0 | 1 | 1 | 2 | 0 | 40 |
| 12 May 1985 | 19 | 11 | 5 | 1 | 1 | 1 | 2 | 0 | 40 |
| 6 May 1990 | 20 | 8 | 6 | 1 | 1 | 1 | 1 | 2 | 40 |

| Election | Majority | Opposition | Council | President of the Region |
|---|---|---|---|---|
| 23 April 1995 | Centre-left (The Olive Tree) 25 / 40 | Centre-right (Pole for Freedoms) 15 / 40 | | Antonio Falconio (1995–2000) |
| 16 April 2000 | Centre-right (House of Freedoms) 26 / 43 | Centre-left (The Olive Tree) 17 / 43 | | Giovanni Pace (2000–2005) |
| 3 April 2005 | Centre-left (The Union) 27 / 40 | Centre-right (House of Freedoms) 13 / 40 | | Ottaviano Del Turco (2005–2008) |
| 14 December 2008 (snap election) | Centre-right 27 / 45 | Centre-left 16 / 45 UDC 2 / 45 | | Giovanni Chiodi (2008–2014) |
| 25 May 2014 | Centre-left 18 / 31 | Centre-right 7 / 31 M5S 6 / 31 | | Luciano D'Alfonso (2014–2018) |
| 10 February 2019 (snap election) | Centre-right 18 / 31 | M5S 7 / 31 Centre-left 6 / 31 | | Marco Marsilio (since 2019) |
| 10 March 2024 | Centre-right 18 / 31 | Centre-left 13 / 31 | | Marco Marsilio (since 2019) |

== Presidents ==
This is a list of the Presidents of the Regional Council (Italian: Presidenti del Consiglio regionale):

| Name | Period | | Regional Legislature |
|---|---|---|---|
| Giuseppe De Cecco (DC) | 6 July 1970 | 18 July 1970 | I (1970) |
| Emilio Mattucci (DC) | 18 July 1970 | 4 July 1975 | I (1970) |
| Emilio Mattucci (DC) | 4 July 1975 | 9 October 1975 | II (1975) |
| Marcello Russo (PSI) | 9 October 1975 | 1 March 1977 | II (1975) |
| Arnaldo Di Giovanni (PCI) | 1 March 1977 | 6 April 1979 | II (1975) |
| Giuseppe Bolino (DC) | 6 April 1979 | 7 July 1980 | II (1975) |
| Giuseppe Bolino (DC) | 7 July 1980 | 16 December 1980 | III (1980) |
| Egidio Marinaro (PSI) | 16 December 1980 | 11 June 1985 | III (1980) |
| Gaetano Novello (DC) | 11 June 1985 | 15 November 1988 | IV (1985) |
| Nino Pace (PSI) | 15 November 1988 | 5 July 1989 | IV (1985) |
| Paolo Pizzola (PSI) | 5 July 1989 | 4 June 1990 | IV (1985) |
| Rocco Salini (DC) | 4 June 1990 | 31 July 1990 | V (1990) |
| Vincenzo Del Colle (DC) | 31 July 1990 | 24 October 1992 | V (1990) |
| Mario Pennetta (DC) | 24 October 1992 | 23 November 1993 | V (1990) |
| Giuliano Giuliani (PDS) | 23 November 1993 | 29 May 1995 | V (1990) |
| Gianni Melilla (PDS) | 29 May 1995 | 2 May 1997 | VI (1995) |
| Umberto Aimola (PDS) | 2 May 1997 | 22 May 2000 | VI (1995) |
| Giuseppe Tagliente (FI) | 22 May 2000 | 16 May 2005 | VII (2000) |
| Marino Roselli (PD) | 16 May 2005 | 27 January 2009 | VIII (2005) |
| Nazario Pagano (PdL) | 27 January 2009 | 30 June 2014 | IX (2008) |
| Giuseppe Di Pangrazio (PD) | 30 June 2014 | 12 March 2019 | X (2014) |
| Lorenzo Sospiri (FI) | 12 March 2019 | 26 March 2024 | XI (2019) |
| Lorenzo Sospiri (FI) | 26 March 2024 | Incumbent | XII (2024) |

== See also ==
- Regional council
- Politics of Abruzzo
- President of Abruzzo
