= Nazario Pagano =

Italian politician

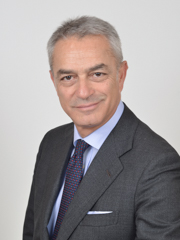
Nazario Pagano in 2018

Nazario Pagano (born 23 May 1957) is an Italian senator from Forza Italia. He represents Abruzzo.

== Biography ==
Nazario Pagano was born on 23 May 1957 in Naples, but he lives and works in Pescara, where, after graduating in law from the University of Teramo, he opened a law firm and began working as a lawyer.

His political career began in 1990, when he was elected municipal councillor in Pescara in the 1990 Italian local elections, a position he held for six terms.

From 1992 to 1993, he served as assessor for housing rights, and from 1998 to 2000, he was in charge of urban planning and urban mobility.

In the 2000 Abruzzo regional election, he ran as a candidate for Forza Italia, supporting presidential candidate Giovanni Pace, and was elected to the Regional Council of Abruzzo from the Province of Pescara constituency. He was re-elected in the 2005 Abruzzo regional election, becoming the leader of Forza Italia in the Regional Council until 2008. He was re-elected in the 2008 Abruzzo regional election with The People of Freedom and was elected president of the Regional Council.

On 16 November 2013, following the dissolution of The People of Freedom, he joined the re-established Forza Italia and became the regional coordinator in Abruzzo.

In the 2018 Italian general election, he was elected to the Senate as a leading candidate for Forza Italia in the Abruzzo-01 multi-member constituency. During the 18th Legislature, he was a member and vice-president of the 1st Standing Committee on Constitutional Affairs and a member of the parliamentary committee on Schengen, Europol, and immigration.

In December 2019, he promoted the 2020 Italian constitutional referendum on the reduction of parliamentarians, being the first among the 64 signatories (41 from Forza Italia).

In the 2022 Italian general election, he was elected to the Chamber of Deputies as a leading candidate for Forza Italia in the Abruzzo-01 multi-member constituency. In the 19th Legislature, he became president of the 1st Standing Committee on Constitutional Affairs, Presidency of the Council, and Interior.
