= Mario Pupillo =

Italian politician (born 1950)

President of the Province of Chieti
- In office 13 October 2014 – 24 December 2021
- Preceded by: Enrico Di Giuseppantonio
- Succeeded by: Francesco Menna

Mayor of Lanciano
- In office 31 May 2011 – 20 October 2021
- Preceded by: Filippo Paolini
- Succeeded by: Filippo Paolini

Personal details
- Born: 3 May 1950 (age 76) Pratola Peligna, Province of L'Aquila, Italy
- Party: Democratic Party

Mario Pupillo (born 3 May 1950) is an Italian politician who served as president of the Province of Chieti from 2014 to 2021. He also served as mayor of Lanciano for two consecutive terms.

== Life and career ==
Pupillo was born in Pratola Peligna, in the province of L'Aquila, in 1950. He worked as a physician at the Renzetti Hospital in Lanciano, where he was responsible for the diabetes unit. In 2021, after his retirement, he volunteered during a mass COVID-19 screening campaign organized by the ASL 2 Lanciano-Vasto-Chieti.

Pupillo was elected mayor of Lanciano in the 2011 local elections, standing as the candidate of the Democratic Party and a centre-left coalition. He won the runoff against centre-right candidate Ermando Bozza with 58.20% of the vote, becoming the first centre-left mayor of Lanciano. He was re-elected in 2016 with 54.75% of the vote.

In October 2014, Pupillo was elected president of the Province of Chieti under the electoral system introduced by the Delrio Law. Pupillo, the centre-left candidate, received 48,343 weighted votes (58.35%), compared with 34,350 (41.65%) for his opponent Nicola Scaricaciottoli. In 2018, he was re-elected president of the province, defeating Umberto Di Primio, the mayor of Chieti.

In the 2024 Abruzzo regional election, Pupillo ran for the Regional Council of Abruzzo supporting presidential candidate Luciano D'Amico. He received 1,247 preference votes in the Chieti constituency, placing sixth among the list's candidates, and was not elected.
