= Claudio Ruffini =

Italian politician (born 1953)

Member of the Regional Council of Abruzzo
- In office 9 January 2009 – 10 June 2014

President of the Province of Teramo
- In office 19 March 1994 – 17 June 2004
- Preceded by: Osvaldo Scrivani
- Succeeded by: Ernino D'Agostino

Mayor of Giulianova
- In office 19 June 2004 – 28 July 2008
- Preceded by: Giancarlo Cameli
- Succeeded by: Francesco Mastromauro

Mayor of Mosciano Sant'Angelo
- In office 29 November 1986 – 14 February 1994

Personal details
- Born: 22 January 1953 (age 73) Mosciano Sant'Angelo, Province of Teramo, Italy
- Party: Italian Communist Party; Democratic Party of the Left; Democrats of the Left; Democratic Party
- Occupation: Surveyor

Claudio Ruffini (born 22 January 1953) is an Italian politician who served as a member of the Regional Council of Abruzzo from 2009 to 2014 and president of the Province of Teramo from 1994 to 2004.

== Life and career ==
Born in Mosciano Sant'Angelo in 1953, Ruffini joined the Italian Communist Party (PCI) and was elected to the town council in the 1980s. He served as mayor of Mosciano Sant'Angelo from 1986 to 1994 and was elected to the Provincial Council of Teramo in 1990. Following the dissolution of the PCI, he joined the Democratic Party of the Left and subsequently the Democrats of the Left, serving as president of the Province of Teramo for three terms from 1994 to 2004.

After completing his tenure as provincial president, Ruffini was elected mayor of Giulianova. In the 2008 regional election, he was elected to the Regional Council of Abruzzo on the Democratic Party (PD) list.

In 2019, Ruffini announced his retirement from politics and confirmed that he had left the PD.
