= 2014 Italian regional elections =

Ballots for 7 of the 20 regional assemblies of Italy

← 2013	February–November 2014	2015 →

Presidents and regional assemblies of Sardinia, Piedmont, Abruzzo, Emilia-Romagna and Calabria

A special round of regional elections in Italy took place in 2014 in five of the country’s twenty regions, including Sardinia (16 February), Piedmont and Abruzzo (25 May), Emilia-Romagna and Calabria (23 November).

== Overview ==
The regional elections were held early in Piedmont, Emilia-Romagna and Calabria, after the respective presidents had resigned from office or the regional councils had been dissolved.

In Emilia-Romagna, the incumbent president Vasco Errani resigned in July 2014 after a scandal, while in Calabria president Giuseppe Scopelliti also resigned in May 2014 after being convicted of abuse of office and false accounting. In Piedmont the 2010 regional election was declared invalid.

The elections were all won by the centre-left coalition.

== Overall results ==
=== Regional councils ===
Alliance	Votes	%	Seats
Centre-left coalition	2,613,714	49.42	139 / 223
Centre-right coalition	1,516,013	28.66	60 / 223
Five Star Movement	699,530	13.22	19 / 223
Others	459,799	8.70	5 / 223
Total	5,289,056	100	223 / 223

=== Presidents of the regions ===
Region	Election day	Outgoing			Elected		
Region	Election day	President	Party	Alliance	President	Party	Alliance
Sardinia	16 February	Ugo Cappellacci	FI	Centre-right	Francesco Pigliaru	PD	Centre-left
Abruzzo	25 May	Giovanni Chiodi	FI	Centre-right	Luciano D'Alfonso	PD	Centre-left
Piedmont	25 May	Roberto Cota	LN	Centre-right	Sergio Chiamparino	PD	Centre-left
Calabria	23 November	Giuseppe Scopelliti	NCD	Centre-right	Mario Oliverio	PD	Centre-left
Emilia-Romagna	23 November	Vasco Errani	PD	Centre-left	Stefano Bonaccini	PD	Centre-left

== Results by region ==
=== Sardinia ===
President				Regional council			
Candidate	Party	Votes	%	Alliance	Votes	%	Seats
Francesco Pigliaru	PD	312,982	42.5	Centre-left	289,573	42.5	36
Ugo Cappellacci	FI	292,395	39.7	Centre-right	299,349	43.9	24
Others		131,928	17.9	Others	93,100	13.6	0
Voters: 738,127 — Turnout: 52.3%

=== Abruzzo ===
President				Regional council			
Candidate	Party	Votes	%	Alliance	Votes	%	Seats
Luciano D'Alfonso	PD	319,887	46.3	Centre-left	313,267	46.6	18
Giovanni Chiodi	FI	202,346	29.3	Centre-right	197,798	29.4	7
Sara Marcozzi	M5S	148,035	21.4	M5S	143,779	21.4	6
Others		21,224	3.1	Others	20,221	3.0	0
Voters: 745,865 — Turnout: 61.6%

=== Piedmont ===
President				Regional council			
Candidate	Party	Votes	%	Alliance	Votes	%	Seats
Sergio Chiamparino	PD	1,057,031	47.1	Centre-left	930,901	47.8	33
Gilberto Pichetto	FI	495,993	22.1	Centre-right	479,289	24.6	9
Davide Bono	M5S	481,453	21.5	M5S	396,295	20.3	8
Guido Crosetto	FdI	117,807	5.2	FdI	72,776	3.7	1
Others		92,218	4.1	Others	68,526	3.5	0
Voters: 2,405,228 — Turnout: 66.4%

=== Calabria ===
President				Regional council			
Candidate	Party	Votes	%	Alliance	Votes	%	Seats
Mario Oliverio	PD	490,229	61.4	Centre-left	482,788	61.7	20
Wanda Ferro	FI	188,288	23.6	Centre-right	182,608	23.3	8
Vincenzo D'Ascola	NCD	69,521	8.7	AP	68,594	8.8	3
Others		50,225	6.3	Others	48,407	6.2	0
Voters: 836,531 — Turnout: 44.1%

=== Emilia-Romagna ===
President				Regional council			
Candidate	Party	Votes	%	Alliance	Votes	%	Seats
Stefano Bonaccini	PD	615,723	49.1	Centre-left	597,185	49.7	32
Alan Fabbri	LN	374,736	29.9	Centre-right	356,969	29.7	12
Giulia Gibertoni	M5S	167,022	13.3	M5S	159,456	13.3	5
Cristina Quintavalla	Ind	50,211	4.0	AET	44,676	3.7	1
Others		47,566	3.8	Others	43,499	3.6	0
Voters: 1,304,841 — Turnout: 37.7%
