= Political Action =

Political Action Azione Politica
- Coordinator: Gianluca Zelli
- Founded: 2017
- Headquarters: Via Niccolò Persichetti 44, L'Aquila
- Ideology: Regionalism; Liberalism; Popularism
- Political position: Centre-right
- Regional Council of Abruzzo: 0 / 31

Website
- https://azionepolitica.it/

Political Action (Azione Politica, AP) is a liberal political party based in Abruzzo, Italy.

== History ==
Political Action was founded in 2017 by Gianluca Zelli.

In 2019, the party took part in the regional election in Abruzzo among the ranks of the centre-right coalition, in support of the candidacy of Marco Marsilio, getting 3.24% of the vote and one seat. Following the election, AP was excluded from the regional government, provoking the anger of Zelli, who resigned as coordinator of the party. However, the resignations returned a few days later, following a request from the regional coordination of the party.

In the 2020 local elections, the party took part in the municipal election of Chieti, in a coalition of civic lists in support of Paolo De Cesare, scoring just 1.63% of the vote. In the ballot it supported the candidate of the centre-left, Diego Ferrara, and won one seat.

In occasion of the 2023 local elections, the party announced to support the candidacy of Maria Cristina Marroni for Mayor of Teramo.

On the occasion of the 2024 regional election in Abruzzo, AP reached an electoral agreement with the League.
