= Statute of Abruzzo =

- Flag of Abruzzo
- Ratified: 22 September 2006 (date of publication in the Official Bulletin of Abruzzo)
- Date effective: 11 January 2007

Government structure
- Branches: Two (Legislative and Executive)
- Chambers: unicameral: Regional Council of Abruzzo
- Executive: Executive of Abruzzo
- Federalism: No — Region with ordinary Statute

History
- Amendments: 4
- Last amended: 2015
- Signatories: Ottaviano Del Turco (D)

The Statute of Abruzzo (Italian: Statuto della Regione Abruzzo) is the fundamental law of Abruzzo Region. It was approved by the Regional Council on 28 June and 12 September 2006. The Statute was published in the Official Bulletin of Abruzzo on 22 September 2006 and came into force on 11 January 2007.

== Amendments ==
1. Statutory Regional Law (SRL) 9 February 2012 was composed of 10 clauses. It introduced minor improvements and modified articles 9, 17, 20, 21, 29, 33,39, 50 and 85;
2. SRL 2 April 2013 was composed of 4 clauses and modified articles 14, 24 43 and 85. It decreased the seats of the Regional Council and introduced some improvements;
3. SRL 20 March 2015 was composed of 6 clauses and modified articles 17, 19, 43, 44 and 49. It also introduced article 46-bis
4. SRL 15 October 2015 was composed of a unique clause that introduced article 7-bis, which talks about the right to food.
