= 2024 Abruzzo regional election =

Local election in Central Italy

- 10 March 2024

All 31 seats to the Regional Council of Abruzzo
- Turnout: 52.4% (▼0.7%)
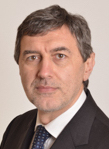

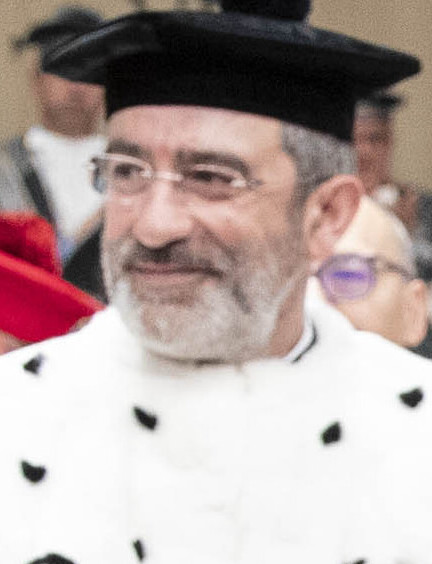
	Majority party	Minority party
Candidate	Marco Marsilio	Luciano D'Amico
Party	Brothers of Italy	Independent
Alliance	Centre-right	Centre-left
Seats won	18	13
Seat change	0	0
Popular vote	326,660	284,748
Percentage	53.5%	46.5%
Swing	▲5.5%	▼5.0% (Note: Compared to the combined vote share achieved in the 2019 Abruzzo regional election by the centre-left coalition and the Five Star Movement, which at the time were not allied.)
- Maps of the results of the presidential election and legislative election
President before election
Marco Marsilio
FdI
Elected President
Marco Marsilio
FdI

The 2024 Abruzzo regional election took place on 10 March 2024. The election was for all 29 elected seats of the Regional Council of Abruzzo, as well as the president of Abruzzo who, along with the second placed presidential candidate, automatically became members of the Regional Council. It was the second election of the 2024 Italian regional elections.

The election was won by the centre-right coalition's incumbent president, Marco Marsilio of Brothers of Italy, over the independent centre-left coalition candidate, Luciano D'Amico, an economist and professor at the University of Teramo, 53.5% to 46.5%. The centre-left coalition, which remains divided at the national level but came from an upset win and gain in the 2024 Sardinian regional election, included both the Five Star Movement and the Action and Italia Viva parties. Despite this combination, known as campo larghissimo, it was not enough for the opposition to win in Abruzzo, although it lost by 7% in what was the fourth most right-wing region of Italy. Marsilio became thus the first president of Abruzzo to be re-elected.

== Background ==
In the 2019 Abruzzo regional election, Marco Marsilio and the centre-right coalition won over the Democratic Party and centre-left coalition candidate Giovanni Legnini 48.0% to 31.3%, with 20.2% of the votes going to the Five Star Movement candidate Sara Marcozzi, who later in July 2023 joined Forza Italia within the centre-right coalition. In January 2022, the election was called for 10 March 2024.

== Electoral system ==
The electoral law is based on proportional representation and is thus proportional to the share of the votes each party receives, with an electoral threshold of 4% of the vote for parties that are not members of coalitions and 2% for those included in a coalition. The election of the Regional Council occurs on a regional basis within the four districts of Abruzzo, coinciding with the four provinces of the region. The district of Chieti elects eight councilors, while Pescara, L'Aquila, and Teramo each elect seven councillors. The president of the Regional Council and the presidential candidate who received the second largest number of votes also become members of the regional council. The candidate who obtains the majority of valid votes at the regional level becomes president. Every candidate must be linked to a party list or an electoral coalition running for the Regional Council. A majority of 60% to 65% of the seats is then allocated to the party or coalition of the elected president.

== Political parties and candidates ==
Political party or alliance	Constituent lists	Previous result		Candidate
Political party or alliance	Constituent lists	Votes (%)	Seats	Candidate
Centre-right coalition	League (Lega) (incl. AP)	27.5	10	Marco Marsilio
Centre-right coalition	Forza Italia (FI)	9.0	3	Marco Marsilio
Centre-right coalition	Brothers of Italy (FdI)	6.5	2	Marco Marsilio
Centre-right coalition	Union of the Centre–Christian Democracy (UDC–DC)	2.9	1	Marco Marsilio
Centre-right coalition	Marsilio for President	—N/a	—N/a	Marco Marsilio
Centre-right coalition	Us Moderates	—N/a	—N/a	Marco Marsilio
Centre-left coalition	Five Star Movement (M5S)	19.7	7	Luciano D'Amico
Centre-left coalition	Democratic Party (PD)	11.1	3	Luciano D'Amico
Centre-left coalition	Reformists and Civics (Abruzzo in Common–Abruzzo Alive–PSI) (incl. +E)	3.9	1	Luciano D'Amico
Centre-left coalition	Greens and Left Alliance – Progressive and Solidary Abruzzo (incl. EV, SI, and DemoS)	2.8	0	Luciano D'Amico
Centre-left coalition	Abruzzo Together	2.7	0	Luciano D'Amico
Centre-left coalition	Action–Socialists Populars Reformists	—N/a	—N/a	Luciano D'Amico

== Opinion polls ==
Date	Polling firm	Marsilio	D'Amico	Lead
21 Feb 2024	Noto	53.0	47.0	6
17–21 Feb 2024	Winpoll	50.6	49.4	1.2
12–16 Feb 2024	Bidimedia	52.6	47.4	5.2
10–15 Jan 2024	EMG	54.5	45.5	9.0
18–22 Dec 2023	Winpoll	50.8	49.2	1.6

=== Political parties ===
Date	Polling firm	Centre-right							Centre-left								Italexit	UP	Others	Lead
Date	Polling firm	FdI	FI	Lega	Marsilio	NM	UdC–DC	Others	PD	M5S	AVS	Action	AI	IV	+E	Others	Italexit	UP	Others	Lead
21 Feb 2024	Noto	31.5	9	5	3.5	3	1.5	—N/a	19.0	15.0	4.0	4.0	3.0	1.5		—N/a	—N/a	—N/a	—N/a	12.5
17–21 Feb 2024	Winpoll	25.2	10.2	6.3	5.9	2.2	0.8	—N/a	17.8	13.4	5.8	4.2	5.2	3.0		—N/a	—N/a	—N/a	—N/a	7.4
12–16 Feb 2024	Bidimedia	29.6	10.2	7.9	3.3	1.2	1.1	—N/a	18.7	10.8	4.1	4.0	6.0	3.1		—N/a	—N/a	—N/a	—N/a	10.9
10–15 Jan 2024	EMG	31.0	10.0	8.0	3.0	—N/a	1.0	2.0	15.5	18.0	2.5	4.5	—N/a	2.0	1.5	2.0	—N/a	—N/a	—N/a	13.0
18–22 Dec 2023	Winpoll	29.2	11.6	5.8	—N/a	—N/a	—N/a	—N/a	18.6	17.1	3.5	2.9	—N/a	3,5	1.3	—N/a	2.4	0.6	3.6	10.6

=== Approval ratings ===
Marco Marsilio
Date	Polling firm	Approve	Disapprove	Undecided
21 Feb 2024	Noto	40	60	
17-21 Feb 2024	Winpoll	47	53	
12–16 Feb 2024	Bidimedia	40	56	4
8–13 Dec 2023	Lab2101	51.4	48.6	
Oct 2023	Piepoli	18	82	
Aug 2023	Lab2101	51.2	48.8	
Jul 2023	Noto	45	55	
May 2023	SWG	35	65	
10–23 Aug 2022	Lab2101	50.9	49.1	
Jul 2022	Noto	46	54	
May 2022	SWG	36	64	
Jul 2021	Noto	45	55	

Luciano D'Amico
Date	Polling firm	Approve	Disapprove	Undecided
21 Feb 2024	Noto	41	59	
17-21 Feb 2024	Winpoll	59	41	
12–16 Feb 2024	Bidimedia	45	50	5

== Results ==
10 March 2024 Abruzzo regional election results
Candidates	Votes	%	Seats	Parties	Votes	%	Seats
Marco Marsilio	326,660	53.50	1	Brothers of Italy	139,578	24.10	8
Marco Marsilio	326,660	53.50	1	Forza Italia	77,841	13.44	4
Marco Marsilio	326,660	53.50	1	League	43,816	7.56	2
Marco Marsilio	326,660	53.50	1	Marsilio for President	33,102	5.72	2
Marco Marsilio	326,660	53.50	1	Us Moderates	15,516	2.68	1
Marco Marsilio	326,660	53.50	1	Union of the Centre–Christian Democracy	6,784	1.17	–
Marco Marsilio	326,660	53.50	1	Total	316,637	54.67	17
Luciano D'Amico	284,748	46.50	1	Democratic Party	117,497	20.29	6
Luciano D'Amico	284,748	46.50	1	Abruzzo Together	44,353	7.66	2
Luciano D'Amico	284,748	46.50	1	Five Star Movement	40,629	7.01	2
Luciano D'Amico	284,748	46.50	1	Action–Socialists Populars Reformists	23,156	4.00	1
Luciano D'Amico	284,748	46.50	1	Greens and Left Alliance	20,655	3.57	1
Luciano D'Amico	284,748	46.50	1	Reformists and Civics	16,275	2.81	–
Luciano D'Amico	284,748	46.50	1	Total	262,565	45.33	12
Invalid votes	18,197	–					
Total candidates	612,408	100.00	2	Total parties	579,202	100.00	29
Registered voters	1,208,207	51.19					
Source: Ministry of the Interior – Results

Popular vote
FdI	24.10%
PD	20.29%
FI	13.44%
AI	7.66%
Lega	7.56%
M5S	7.01%
Marsilio	5.72%
Az	4.00%
AVS	3.57%
RC	2.81%
NM	2.68%
UDC	1.17%

President
Marsilio	53.5%
D'Amico	46.5%

=== Voter turnout ===
Region	Time		
Region	12:00	19:00	23:00
Abruzzo	15.90%	43.93%	52.38%
Province	Time		
Province	12:00	19:00	23:00
Chieti	14.88%	40.47%	48.48%
L'Aquila	16.79%	47.51%	55.50%
Pescara	16.13%	44.45%	53.40%
Teramo	16.19%	44.67%	53.15%
Source: Ministry of the Interior – Turnout

=== Results by province and major cities ===
Province	Luciano D'Amico	Marco Marsilio
Chieti	86,074 48.47%	91,526 51.53%
L'Aquila	56,251 38.69%	89,154 61.31%
Pescara	71,673 48.30%	76,732 51.70%
Teramo	70,750 50.18%	70,248 49.82%

City	Luciano D'Amico	Marco Marsilio
Pescara	29,507 52.29%	26,919 47.71%
L'Aquila	16,706 47.27%	18,633 52.73%
Montesilvano	9,749 42.57%	13,150 57.43%
Teramo	14,272 53.29%	12,512 46.71%
Avezzano	7,230 37.51%	12,047 62.49%
Vasto	9,503 51.86%	8,822 48.14%
Lanciano	8,416 50.10%	8,384 49.90%
Roseto degli Abruzzi	6,881 58.87%	4,780 41.13%
Francavilla al Mare	5,832 48.57%	6,175 51.43%
Giulianova	5,879 54.47%	4,915 45.53%
Ortona	5,026 48.07%	5,430 51.93%
Sulmona	4,605 40.32%	6,815 59.68%
San Salvo	3,120 35.27%	5,725 64.73%
Spoltore	4,661 54.53%	3,887 45.47%
Martinsicuro	2,432 44.19%	3,072 55.81%
Silvi	2,671 43.49%	3,471 56.51%
