= Osvaldo Scrivani =

Italian politician (1946–2025)

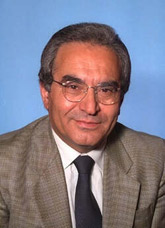

Member of the Chamber of Deputies
- In office 1996–2001

Member of the Senate of the Republic
- In office 1994–1996

President of the Province of Teramo
- In office 21 July 1991 – 24 January 1994
- Preceded by: Goffredo Tomassi
- Succeeded by: Claudio Ruffini

Personal details
- Born: 31 March 1946 Mosciano Sant'Angelo, Province of Teramo, Italy
- Died: 19 September 2025 (aged 79) Giulianova, Abruzzo, Italy
- Party: Italian Communist Party; Democratic Party of the Left; Democrats of the Left

Osvaldo Scrivani (31 March 1946 – 19 September 2025) was an Italian politician who served as president of the Province of Teramo from 1991 to 1994, Senator of the Republic from 1994 to 1996 and Deputy from 1996 to 2001.
