= Tommaso Coletti (politician) =

Italian politician (born 1949)

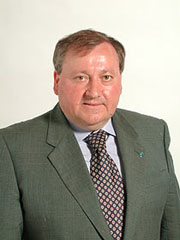

President of the Province of Chieti
- In office 28 June 2004 – 8 June 2009
- Preceded by: Mauro Febbo
- Succeeded by: Enrico Di Giuseppantonio

Senator of the Republic
- In office 2001–2006
- Constituency: Abruzzo

Member of the Regional Council of Abruzzo
- In office 29 May 1995 – 31 March 2004

Personal details
- Born: 24 January 1949 (age 77) Ortona, Province of Chieti, Italy
- Party: Italian People's Party (1994–2001); The Daisy (2001–2007); Democratic Party (since 2007)

Tommaso Coletti (born 24 January 1949) is an Italian politician who served as president of the Province of Chieti from 2004 to 2009 and as a Senator of the Republic from 2001 to 2006. He served as a member of the Regional Council of Abruzzo from 1995 to 2004, also becoming vice president from 1995 to 2000.
