= List of mayors of Teramo =

Mayor of Teramo
- Sindaco di Teramo
- Incumbent; Gianguido D'Alberto since 28 June 2018
- Appointer: Popular election
- Term length: 5 years, renewable once
- Formation: 1860
- Website: Official website

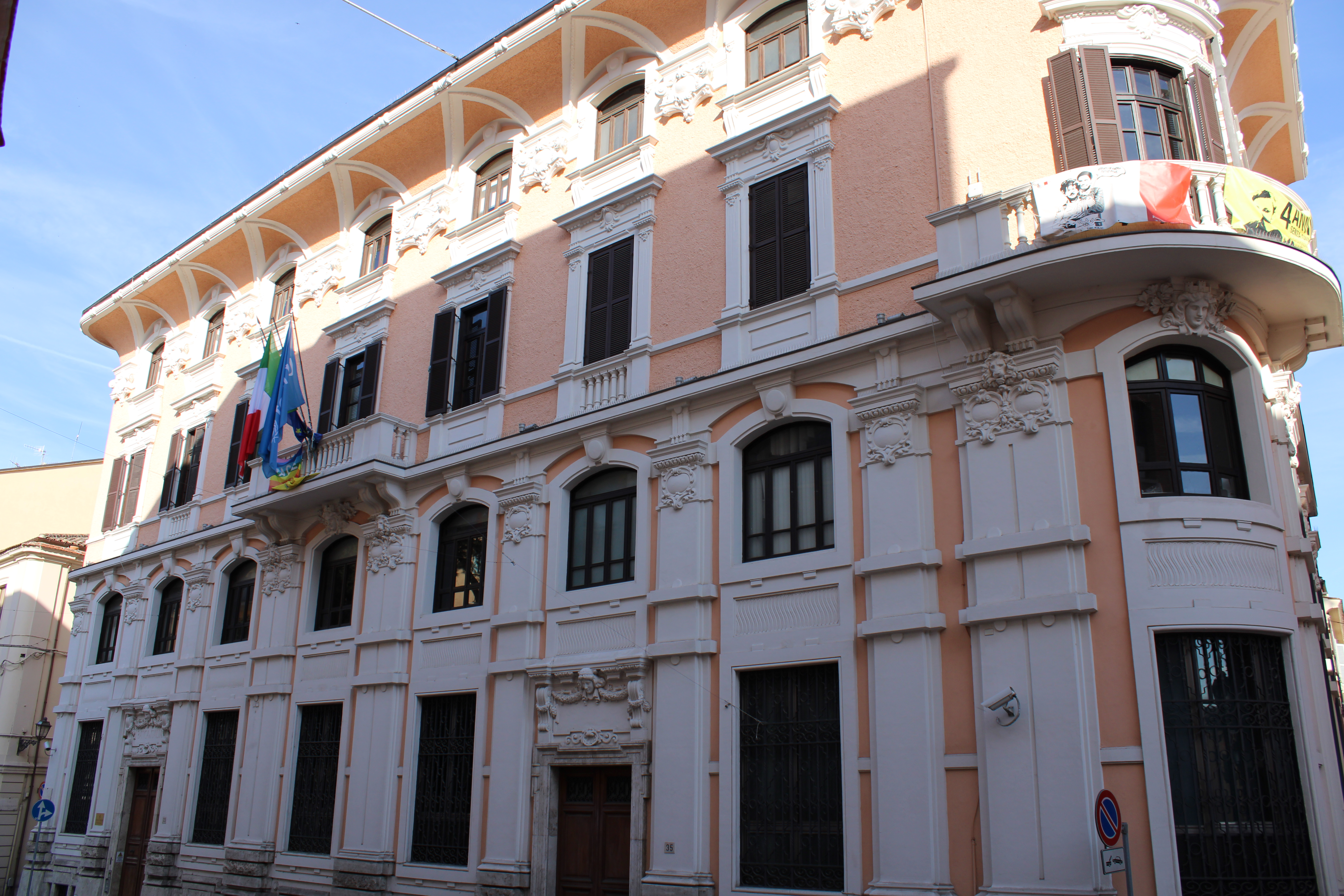
Teramo's Town Hall.

The mayor of Teramo is an elected politician who, along with the Teramo City Council, is accountable for the strategic government of Teramo in Abruzzo, Italy.

The current mayor is Gianguido D'Alberto, a centre-left independent, who took office on 28 June 2018.

== Overview ==
According to the Italian Constitution, the mayor of Teramo is member of the City Council.

The mayor is elected by the population of Teramo, who also elects the members of the City Council, controlling the mayor's policy guidelines and is able to enforce his resignation by a motion of no confidence. The mayor is entitled to appoint and release the members of his government.

Since 1995 the mayor is elected directly by Teramo's electorate: in all mayoral elections in Italy in cities with a population higher than 15,000 the voters express a direct choice for the mayor or an indirect choice voting for the party of the candidate's coalition. If no candidate receives at least 50% of votes, the top two candidates go to a second round after two weeks. The election of the City Council is based on a direct choice for the candidate with a preference vote: the candidate with the majority of the preferences is elected. The number of the seats for each party is determined proportionally.

== Italian Republic (since 1946) ==
=== City Council election (1946–1995) ===
From 1946 to 1995, the mayor of Teramo was elected by the City Council.

	Mayor	Term start	Term end	Party
1	Francesco Franchi	1946	1949	PdA
2	Alfredo Biocca	1951	1956	DC
3	Carino Gambacorta	1956	1969	DC
4	Ferdinando Di Paola	1969	1979	DC
5	Gennaro Valeri	1979	1985	DC
6	Pietro D'Ignazio	1985	1993	DC
7	Antonio Gatti	1993	1995	DC

=== Direct election (since 1995) ===
Since 1995, under provisions of new local administration law, the mayor of Teramo is chosen by direct election, originally every four, then every five years.

	Mayor	Term start	Term end	Party	Coalition	Election
8	Angelo Sperandio	24 April 1995	14 June 1999	PDS; DS	PDS • PPI • PdD • FdV	1995
8	Angelo Sperandio	14 June 1999	14 June 2004	PDS; DS	DS • PPI • Dem	1999
9	Giovanni Chiodi	14 June 2004	28 July 2008 (Note: Resigned in order to participate to the regional election.)	FI; PdL	FI • AN • UDC	2004
Special Prefectural Commissioner tenure (28 July 2008 – 8 June 2009)
10	Maurizio Brucchi	8 June 2009	9 June 2014	PdL; FI	PdL • UDC	2009
10	Maurizio Brucchi	9 June 2014	6 December 2017 (Note: Resigned after losing the majority in the City Council.)	PdL; FI	FI • NCD	2014
Special Prefectural Commissioner tenure (6 December 2017 – 28 June 2018)
11	Gianguido D'Alberto	28 June 2018	23 May 2023	Ind	PD	2018
11	Gianguido D'Alberto	23 May 2023	Incumbent	Ind	PD • AVS • M5S	2023

== Bibliography ==
- Di Felice, Paola; Addari, Igino (2011). La "Sala Grande" della città di Teramo. Teramo.
