= Guerino Testa =

Italian politician (born 1970)

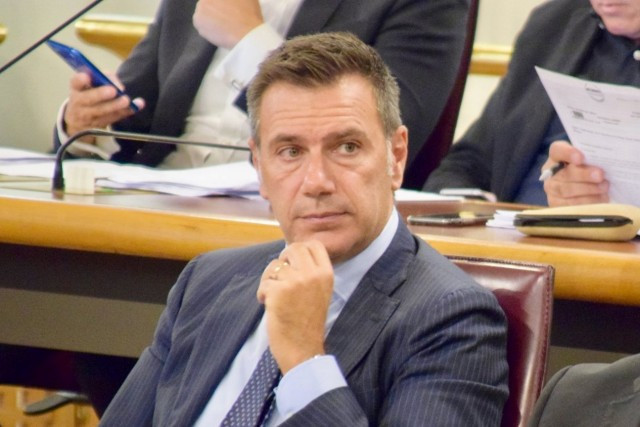
- Testa in 2022

Member of the Chamber of Deputies
- Incumbent
- Assumed office 13 October 2022
- Constituency: Abruzzo – 02

President of the Province of Pescara
- In office 8 June 2009 – 12 October 2014
- Preceded by: Giuseppe De Dominicis
- Succeeded by: Antonio Di Marco

Personal details
- Born: 16 March 1970 (age 56)
- Party: Brothers of Italy (since 2017)

Guerino Testa (born 16 March 1970) is an Italian politician serving as a member of the Chamber of Deputies since 2022. From 2009 to 2014, he served as president of the province of Pescara.
