= Maurizio Brucchi =

Italian politician

Mayor of Teramo
- In office 8 June 2009 – 6 December 2017
- Preceded by: Giovanni Chiodi
- Succeeded by: Gianguido D'Alberto

Personal details
- Born: 21 September 1961 (age 64) Teramo, Abruzzo, Italy
- Party: Forza Italia (until 2009); The People of Freedom (2009-2013); Forza Italia (since 2013)
- Education: University of L'Aquila
- Profession: physician, professor

Maurizio Brucchi (born 21 September 1961 in Teramo) is an Italian politician.

He was a member of the centre-right party The People of Freedom and was elected Mayor of Teramo during the 2009 Italian local elections and took office on 8 June 2009. He was re-elected for a second term at the 2014 elections. He resigned on 4 December 2017 after an internal government crisis and left office on 6 December.

Political offices
Preceded by Giovanni Chiodi	Mayor of Teramo; 2009–2017	Succeeded by Gianguido D'Alberto
