= Alberto Bagnai =

Italian politician and economist (born 1962)

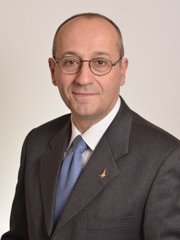

Member of the Chamber of Deputies
- In office 13 October 2022 – 15 September 2026
- Succeeded by: Luciano D'Amico
- Constituency: Chieti

Member of the Senate of the Republic
- In office 23 March 2018 – 13 October 2022
- Constituency: Abruzzo

Personal details
- Born: 10 December 1962 (age 63) Florence, Italy
- Party: Lega
- Children: 2
- Education: Sapienza University of Rome
- Profession: Politician, economist, university professor

Alberto Bagnai (born 10 December 1962) is an Italian politician and economist.

== Biography ==
Bagnai was born in 1962 in Florence. After moving to Rome in 1971, he studied economy at the Department of Public Economics of the Sapienza University of Rome. In 1989, he graduated in economics and commerce at the age of 27, with an econometrics thesis on "Procedures for the Estimation and Verification of Econometric Hypotheses". He then discussed a PhD thesis in Economics in 1994 with a dissertation on "Sustainability and Dynamic Pathways of Public Debt in Italy".

In 2005, Bagnai became associate professor of economic policy at the Faculty of Economics of the D'Annunzio University of Chieti–Pescara. Since 2012, he is associate researcher at CREAM at the University of Rouen Normandy, and since 2013 has been a member of the board of the International Network for Economic Research. In the same year, he formed the Italian Association for the Study of Economic Asymmetries, which he currently chairs.

In 2012, Bagnai published Il tramonto dell'euro (The Decline of the Euro). With a strongly Eurosceptic and anti-globalist orientation, Bagnai calls himself a post-Keynesian economist, and adheres to the orthodox vision expressed by economists such as James Meade, Anthony Thirlwall, and Martin Feldstein, according to which there are no structural assumptions for Europe to equip itself of a single currency. Bagnai also defines himself as a left-wing populist.

In 2014, Bagnai published L'Italia può farcela ("Italy Can Do It"). In the 2018 Italian general election, he was elected senator among the ranks of the Lega party, and in 2020 was nominated as in charge of the economy and finances of the party by the party's secretary Matteo Salvini,.
