= Ernino D'Agostino =

Italian politician (1960–2015)

President of the Province of Teramo
- In office 17 June 2004 – 8 June 2009
- Preceded by: Claudio Ruffini
- Succeeded by: Valter Catarra

Personal details
- Born: 6 October 1960 Caracas, Venezuela
- Died: 4 November 2015 (aged 55) Teramo, Abruzzo, Italy
- Party: Italian Communist Party; Democratic Party of the Left; Democrats of the Left; Democratic Party

Ernino D'Agostino (6 October 1960 – 4 November 2015) was an Italian politician who served as president of the Province of Teramo from 2004 to 2009.

== Life and career ==
Born in Caracas to an Italian-Venezuelan family, D'Agostino entered politics in Teramo, where he was elected to the City Council as a member of the Italian Communist Party in 1985 and subsequently re-elected. He later became provincial secretary of the Democrats of the Left.

In 2004, D'Agostino was elected president of the Province of Teramo, representing the centre-left coalition. He stood for re-election in 2009 with the Democratic Party, but was defeated by candidate Valter Catarra of the People of Freedom.

After leaving public office, D'Agostino became involved with the National Union of Tenants (SUNIA) and Federconsumatori, where he campaigned on behalf of small shareholders affected by the collapse of the local bank Tercas.

D'Agostino died in Teramo on 4 November 2015, aged 55, after battling cancer for several months.
