= Valter Catarra =

Italian politician (1961–2018)

President of the Province of Teramo
- In office 8 June 2009 – 13 October 2014
- Preceded by: Ernino D'Agostino
- Succeeded by: Renzo Di Sabatino

Mayor of Notaresco
- In office 27 May 2003 – 28 May 2013
- Preceded by: Leo Capone
- Succeeded by: Diego Di Bonaventura

Personal details
- Born: 25 March 1961 Charleroi, Belgium
- Died: 12 July 2018 (aged 57) Teramo, Abruzzo, Italy
- Party: Christian Democracy; Union of the Centre; The People of Freedom

Valter Catarra (25 March 1961 – 12 July 2018) was an Italian politician who served as president of the Province of Teramo from 2009 to 2014 and mayor of Notaresco from 2003 to 2013. He entered politics within the Christian Democracy, and later joined the People of Freedom.

Catarra died on 12 July 2018, aged 57, following complications from a scheduled heart operation. He was treated at the Mazzini Hospital in Teramo, where he died in the intensive care unit after suffering a cardiac arrest and undergoing a second operation.
