= Nicola Calandrini =

Italian politician (born 1966)

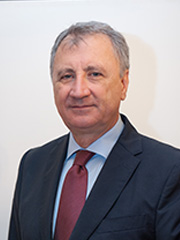
- Calandrini in 2022

Member of the Senate of the Republic
- Incumbent
- Assumed office 19 March 2019
- Preceded by: Marco Marsilio
- Constituency: Lazio

Personal details
- Born: 5 November 1966 (age 59)
- Party: Brothers of Italy

Nicola Calandrini (born 5 November 1966) is an Italian politician of Brothers of Italy serving as a member of the Senate of the Republic. He took office in 2019, succeeding Marco Marsilio, and was re-elected in 2022. Since 2022, he has chaired the Budget Committee.
