= Emilio Mattucci =

Italian politician (1920–2000)

President of Abruzzo
- In office 2 October 1985 – 1 August 1990
- Preceded by: Felice Spadaccini
- Succeeded by: Rocco Salini

President of the Regional Council of Abruzzo
- In office 18 July 1970 – 9 October 1975
- Preceded by: Office established
- Succeeded by: Marcello Russo

President of the Province of Teramo
- In office 23 November 1965 – 7 June 1970
- Preceded by: Zeno Tomassini
- Succeeded by: Giuseppe Lupini

Mayor of Atri
- In office 28 May 1956 – 22 November 1964
- Preceded by: Moreno Pieroni
- Succeeded by: Renata Ronchi

Personal details
- Born: 20 March 1920 Atri, Province of Teramo, Kingdom of Italy
- Died: 12 August 2000 (aged 80) Atri, Abruzzo, Italy
- Party: Christian Democracy

Emilio Mattucci (20 March 1920 – 12 August 2000) was an Italian politician of the Christian Democracy. He served as mayor of Atri from 1956 to 1964, president of the Province of Teramo from 1965 to 1970, and president of the Regional Council of Abruzzo from 1970 to 1975. He later served as president of Abruzzo from 1985 to 1990.
