= Romeo Ricciuti =

Italian politician (1930–2024)

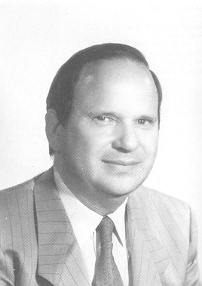

Member of the Chamber of Deputies of Italy for L'Aquila
- In office 12 July 1983 – 14 April 1994

President of Abruzzo
- In office 1 March 1977 – 30 November 1981
- Preceded by: Felice Spadaccini
- Succeeded by: Anna Nenna D'Antonio

Personal details
- Born: 5 October 1930 Giuliano Teatino, Italy
- Died: 25 September 2024 (aged 93) L'Aquila, Italy
- Party: DC
- Occupation: Businessman

Romeo Ricciuti (5 October 1930 – 25 September 2024) was an Italian businessman and politician. A member of Christian Democracy, he served as President of Abruzzo from 1977 to 1981 and was a member of the Chamber of Deputies from 1983 to 1994.

Ricciuti died in L'Aquila on 25 September 2024, at the age of 93.
