= Camillo D'Angelo =

Italian politician (born 1982)

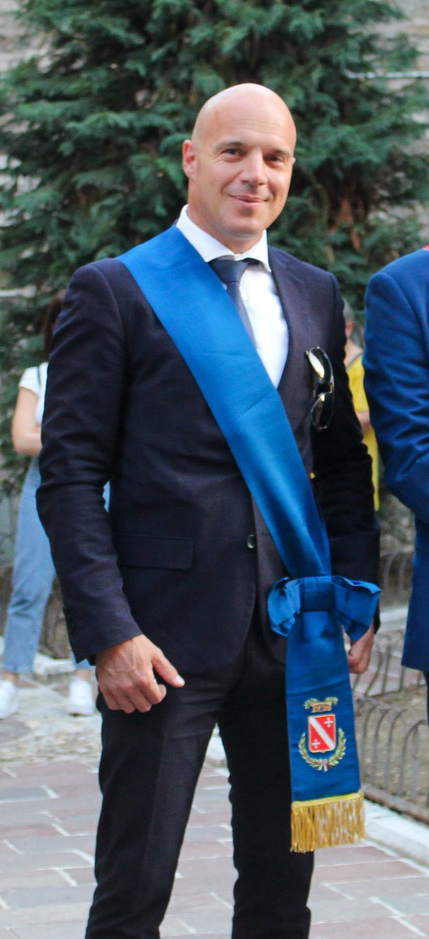
- D'Angelo in 2023

President of the Province of Teramo
- Incumbent
- Assumed office 29 January 2023
- Preceded by: Diego Di Bonaventura

Mayor of Valle Castellana
- Incumbent
- Assumed office 12 June 2017
- Preceded by: Vincenzo Esposito

Personal details
- Born: 20 May 1982 (age 44) Teramo, Abruzzo, Italy
- Education: Marche Polytechnic University
- Occupation: Engineer

Camillo D'Angelo (born 20 May 1982) is an Italian politician serving as president of the Province of Teramo since 2023. He has served as mayor of Valle Castellana since 2017.

In January 2023, D'Angelo was elected president of the Province of Teramo with 40.85% of the weighted votes, supported by a civic and centre-left coalition, defeating Domenico Piccioni (39.25%) and Massimo Vagnoni (19.90%). In 2026, amid rising fuel prices in Italy, D'Angelo gained national attention for an initiative launched during his tenure as mayor of Valle Castellana, where the municipality had taken over the town's only fuel station in 2022 and operated it by selling fuel at cost.
