= Francesco Menna =

Italian politician (born 1978)

President of the Province of Chieti
- Incumbent
- Assumed office 24 December 2021
- Preceded by: Mario Pupillo

Mayor of Vasto
- Incumbent
- Assumed office 20 June 2016
- Preceded by: Luciano Antonio Lapenna

Personal details
- Born: 8 June 1978 (age 48) Vasto, Abruzzo, Italy
- Party: Democratic Party
- Occupation: Lawyer

Francesco Menna (born 8 June 1978) is an Italian lawyer and politician serving as president of the Province of Chieti since 2021. He has served as mayor of Vasto since 2016.

In the 2021 provincial election, Menna, supported by the centre-left coalition, was elected president of the Province of Chieti, defeating centre-right candidate Filippo Paolini. Menna received 50,841 weighted votes (59.21%), compared with 35,025 (40.79%) for Paolini. In 2026, he was re-confirmed for a second term, defeating centre-right candidate Angelo Di Nardo with 56.86% of the vote against 43.11%.
