= Ugo Crescenzi =

Italian politician (1930–2017)

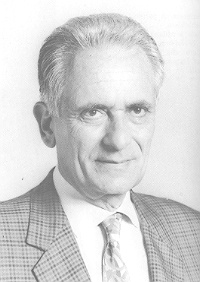

1st President of Abruzzo
- In office September 3, 1970 – March 23, 1972
- Preceded by: Office created
- Succeeded by: Giustino De Cecco

President of Abruzzo
- In office July 16, 1973 – May 31, 1974
- Preceded by: Giustino De Cecco
- Succeeded by: Giustino De Cecco

Personal details
- Born: April 25, 1930 San Benedetto del Tronto, Province of Ascoli Piceno, Marche, Italy
- Died: January 9, 2017 (aged 86) Pescara, Province of Pescara, Abruzzo
- Party: DC

Ugo Crescenzi (April 25, 1930 – January 9, 2017) was an Italian politician and member of the Christian Democrats (DC). Crescenzi served as the first President of the Italian region of Abruzzo from 1970 until 1972. He served a second, non-consecutive tenure as Abruzzo's President from 1973 to 1974. He later became a member of the national Chamber of Deputies from 1987 to 1992 as a DC deputy during the Legislature X. Ugo Crescenzi, who spent decades as a prominent DC official in Abruzzo, is credited with improving the modern infrastructure of the city of Pescara, the capital of the region.

Crescenzi was born on April 25, 1930, in San Benedetto del Tronto in the neighboring region of Marche. He moved to Pescara after completing his university studies and married into a Pescaran family.

Crescenzi has been credited with expanding much of Pescara's modern infrastructure. His contributions to the city included the renovations and modernization of the Abruzzo Airport and the Pescara railway station, the expansion of an existing highway, and upgrades to the marina.

Crescenzi was hospitalized on January 5, 2017, for kidney failure. He died four days later in a Pescara hospital on January 9, 2017, at the age of 86. His funeral was held at the Sacro Cuore di Pescara Catholic Church in Pescara on January 11, in Pescara with burial at the Colonnella cemetery in Teramo.

== See also ==
- 1970 Abruzzo regional election
