= Giorgio De Luca (politician) =

Italian politician (born 1960)

President of the Province of Pescara
- Incumbent
- Assumed office 14 March 2026
- Preceded by: Ottavio De Martinis

Mayor of Manoppello
- Incumbent
- Assumed office 6 June 2016
- Preceded by: Gennaro Matarazzo
- In office 28 April 1997 – 30 May 2006
- Preceded by: Maurizio Napoleone
- Succeeded by: Gennaro Matarazzo

Personal details
- Born: 9 May 1960 (age 66) Manoppello, Province of Pescara, Italy
- Party: Christian Democratic Centre; The People of Freedom; Forza Italia

Giorgio De Luca (born 9 May 1960) is an Italian politician serving as president of the Province of Pescara since 2026. He has served as mayor of Manoppello since 2016.

De Luca was elected to the Provincial Council of Pescara in 1995 with the Christian Democratic Centre, and became mayor of Manoppello in 1997, serving until 2006. He later joined The People of Freedom. From 2009 to 2014, he served as president of the Provincial Council of Pescara.

In the 2026 provincial election, De Luca, supported by a centre-right coalition led by Forza Italia and including Brothers of Italy and Lega, was elected president of the Province of Pescara with 68.34% of the weighted vote, defeating centre-left candidate Sebastiano Massimiano, who received 29.27%.
