= Luciano D'Amico =

Italian economist, academic and politician (born 1960)

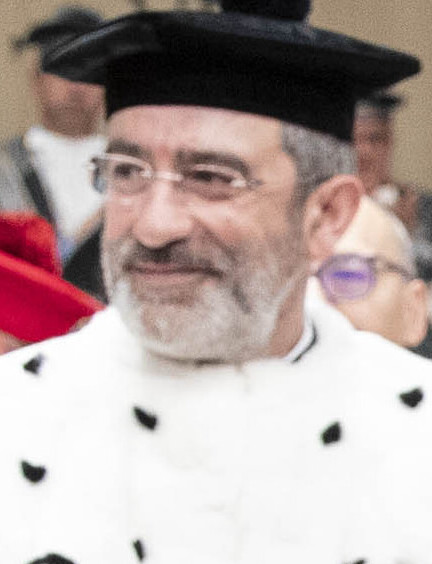
- D'Amico in 2020

Member of the Chamber of Deputies
- Incumbent
- Assumed office 19 November 2026
- Preceded by: Alberto Bagnai
- Constituency: Chieti

Member of the Regional Council of Abruzzo
- In office 27 March 2024 – November 2026

Rector of the University of Teramo
- In office 6 February 2013 – 31 October 2018
- Preceded by: Rita Tranquilli-Leali
- Succeeded by: Dino Mastroccola

Personal details
- Born: 3 January 1960 (age 66) Torricella Peligna, Province of Chieti, Italy
- Party: Centre-left independent
- Education: Gabriele d'Annunzio University
- Occupation: Academic, economist, professor

Luciano D'Amico (born 3 January 1960) is an Italian economist, academic and politician who has served as a member of the Chamber of Deputies since November 2026. He previously served as a member of the Regional Council of Abruzzo from 2024 to 2026.

From February 2013 to October 2018, D'Amico was the rector of the University of Teramo.
