= List of presidents of the Province of Teramo =

President of the Province of Teramo
- Presidente della Provincia di Teramo

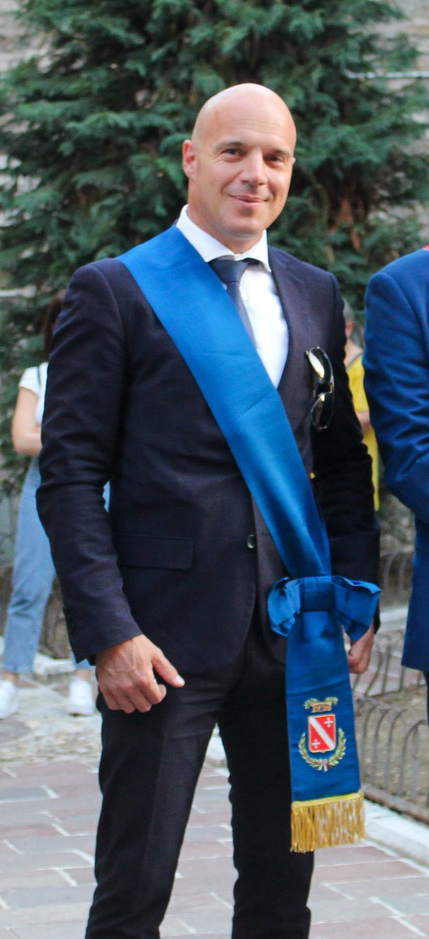
- Incumbent; Camillo D'Angelo since 29 January 2023
- Term length: 4 years
- Inaugural holder: Serafino Palumbi
- Formation: 1889

The president of the Province of Teramo is the head of the provincial government in Teramo, Abruzzo, Italy. The president oversees the administration of the province, coordinates the activities of the municipalities, and represents the province in regional and national matters.

Since January 2023, the office has been held by Camillo D'Angelo, a centre-left independent.

== List ==
=== Presidents of the Provincial Deputation (1889–1928) ===
No.	Portrait	Name	Term of office		Party
No.	Portrait	Name	Start	End	Party
1		Serafino Palumbi	1890	1891	?
2		Michelangelo Forcella	1892	1894	?
3		Augusto Muzii	1895	1900	?
4		Pasquale Ventilii	1900	1901	?
5		Emidio Cerulli	1901	1909	?
6		Ludovico De Petris	1909	1923	?
–		Extraordinary Commission	1923	1928	—

=== Presidents of the Provincial Rectorate (1928–1944) ===
No.	Portrait	Name	Term of office		Party
No.	Portrait	Name	Start	End	Party
1		Gennaro Flaiano	1928	1943	National Fascist Party

=== Presidents of the Provincial Deputation (1944–1951) ===
No.	Portrait	Name	Term of office		Party
No.	Portrait	Name	Start	End	Party
1		Vito Caravelli	1944	1948	Italian Republican Party
2		Vittorino Tarquinii	1948	1951	Independent

=== Presidents of the Province (1951–present) ===
No.	Portrait	Name	Term of office		Party
No.	Portrait	Name	Start	End	Party
1		Vittorino Tarquinii	1951	1961	?
2		Zeno Tomassini	1961	1965	Christian Democracy
3		Emilio Mattucci	1965	1970	Christian Democracy
4		Giuseppe Lupini	1970	1975	?
5		Gabriele Serroni	1975	1980	Italian Democratic Socialist Party
6		Rocco Salini	1980	1985	Christian Democracy
7		Simone Marini	1985	13 January 1986	Christian Democracy
8		Dino Di Giuseppe	13 January 1986	3 August 1990	Italian Socialist Party
9		Goffredo Tomassi	3 August 1990	21 July 1991	Christian Democracy
10		Osvaldo Scrivani	21 July 1991	24 January 1994	Democratic Party of the Left
11		Claudio Ruffini	19 March 1994	8 May 1995	Democratic Party of the Left
11		Claudio Ruffini	8 May 1995	14 June 1999	Democratic Party of the Left
11		Claudio Ruffini	14 June 1999	17 June 2004	Democrats of the Left
12		Ernino D'Agostino	17 June 2004	8 June 2009	Democrats of the Left; Democratic Party
13		Valter Catarra	8 June 2009	13 October 2014	The People of Freedom
14		Renzo Di Sabatino	13 October 2014	31 October 2018	Democratic Party
15		Diego Di Bonaventura	31 October 2018	29 January 2023	Independent (centre-right)
16		Camillo D'Angelo	29 January 2023	Incumbent	Independent (centre-left)

== Sources ==
- "Storia amministrativa dell'ente". Ministero dell'Interno.
- Menichini, Piera (2005). "I presidenti delle Province dall'Unità alla Grande guerra: repertorio analitico". Storia Amministrazione Costituzione (13): 292–293.
