= List of presidents of the Province of Chieti =

President of the Province of Chieti
- Presidente della Provincia di Chieti
- Incumbent; Francesco Menna since 24 December 2021
- Term length: 4 years
- Inaugural holder: Ludovico De Leonardis
- Formation: 1889

The president of the Province of Chieti is the head of the provincial government in Chieti, Abruzzo, Italy. The president oversees the administration of the province, coordinates the activities of the municipalities, and represents the province in regional and national matters.

Since December 2021, the office has been held by Francesco Menna of the Democratic Party.

== List ==
=== Presidents of the Provincial Deputation (1889–1926) ===
No.	Portrait	Name	Term start	Term end	Party
1		Ludovico De Leonardis	1889	1890	?
2		Gaetano Bassi	1890	1892	?
3		Carlo Augusto Ciavolich	1893	1895	?
4		Francesco Morizio	1895	1903	?
5		Camillo Mezzanotte	1903	1905	Historical Left
6		Gaetano Colalè	1905	1908	?
7		Tommaso Nobile	1908	?	?

=== Presidents of the Province (1951–present) ===
No.	Portrait	Name	Term start	Term end	Party
		?	?	?	?
		Germano De Cinque	1970	?	Christian Democracy
		?	?	?	?
		Arduino Roccioletti	30 September 1985	10 October 1993	Christian Democracy
		Mario Amicone	4 November 1993	7 May 1995	Christian Democracy
		Manfredi Giovanni Pulsinelli	7 May 1995	28 June 1999	Italian People's Party
		Mauro Febbo	28 June 1999	28 June 2004	National Alliance
		Tommaso Coletti	28 June 2004	8 June 2009	The Daisy; Democratic Party
		Enrico Di Giuseppantonio	8 June 2009	13 October 2014	Union of the Centre
		Mario Pupillo	13 October 2014	31 October 2018	Democratic Party
		Mario Pupillo	31 October 2018	24 December 2021	Democratic Party
		Francesco Menna	24 December 2021	16 March 2026	Democratic Party
		Francesco Menna	16 March 2026	Incumbent	Democratic Party

== Sources ==
- "Storia amministrativa dell'ente". Ministero dell'Interno.
- Menichini, Piera (2005). "I presidenti delle Province dall'Unità alla Grande guerra: repertorio analitico". Storia Amministrazione Costituzione (13): 242–243.
