= List of presidents of the Province of Pescara =

President of the Province of Pescara
- Presidente della Provincia di Pescara
- Incumbent; Giorgio De Luca since 14 March 2026
- Term length: 4 years
- Inaugural holder: Domenico Tinozzi
- Formation: 1927

The president of the Province of Pescara is the head of the provincial government in Pescara, Abruzzo, Italy. The president oversees the administration of the province, coordinates the activities of the municipalities, and represents the province in regional and national matters.

Since March 2026, the office has been held by Giorgio De Luca of Forza Italia.

== List ==
=== Presidents of the Provincial Rectorate (1927–1943) ===
No.	Portrait	Name	Term		Party
No.	Portrait	Name	Start	End	Party
1		Domenico Tinozzi	1927	1934	National Fascist Party
		?	?	?	?

=== Presidents of the Province (1951–present) ===
No.	Portrait	Name	Term		Party
No.	Portrait	Name	Start	End	Party
		?	?	?	?
		Gaetano Cuzzi	14 October 1985	2 August 1990	Italian Socialist Party
		Gaetano Cuzzi	2 August 1990	28 December 1991	Italian Socialist Party
		Marco Marini	28 December 1991	4 November 1992	Italian Socialist Party
		Fortunato Di Sipio	18 November 1992	8 May 1995	Christian Democracy; Italian People's Party
		Luciano D'Alfonso	8 May 1995	14 June 1999	Italian People's Party
		Giuseppe De Dominicis	14 June 1999	14 June 2004	Democrats of the Left; Democratic Party
		Giuseppe De Dominicis	14 June 2004	8 June 2009	Democrats of the Left; Democratic Party
		Guerino Testa	8 June 2009	12 October 2014	The People of Freedom; New Centre-Right
		Antonio Di Marco	12 October 2014	31 October 2018	Democratic Party
		Antonio Zaffiri	31 October 2018	18 December 2021	Civic list
		Ottavio De Martinis	18 December 2021	14 March 2026	Forza Italia
		Giorgio De Luca	14 March 2026	Incumbent	Forza Italia

== Sources ==
- "Storia amministrativa dell'ente". Ministero dell'Interno.
