= Gianguido D'Alberto =

Italian politician

Mayor of Teramo
- Incumbent
- Assumed office 28 June 2018
- Preceded by: Maurizio Brucchi

Personal details
- Born: 31 March 1977 (age 49) Cosenza, Calabria, Italy
- Party: Centre-left independent
- Education: University of Teramo
- Profession: Lawyer

Gianguido D'Alberto (born 31 March 1977 in Cosenza) is an Italian politician.

D'Alberto ran as an independent for the office of Mayor of Teramo at the 2018 Italian local elections, supported by a centre-left coalition. He won and took office on 28 June 2018.

== See also ==
- 2018 Italian local elections
- List of mayors of Teramo

Political offices
| Preceded by Maurizio Brucchi | Mayor of Teramo since 2018 | Incumbent |
