= 2014 Abruzzo regional election =

Regional election in Italy

- 25 May 2014

All 31 seats to the Regional Council of Abruzzo
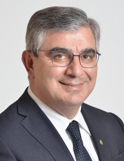

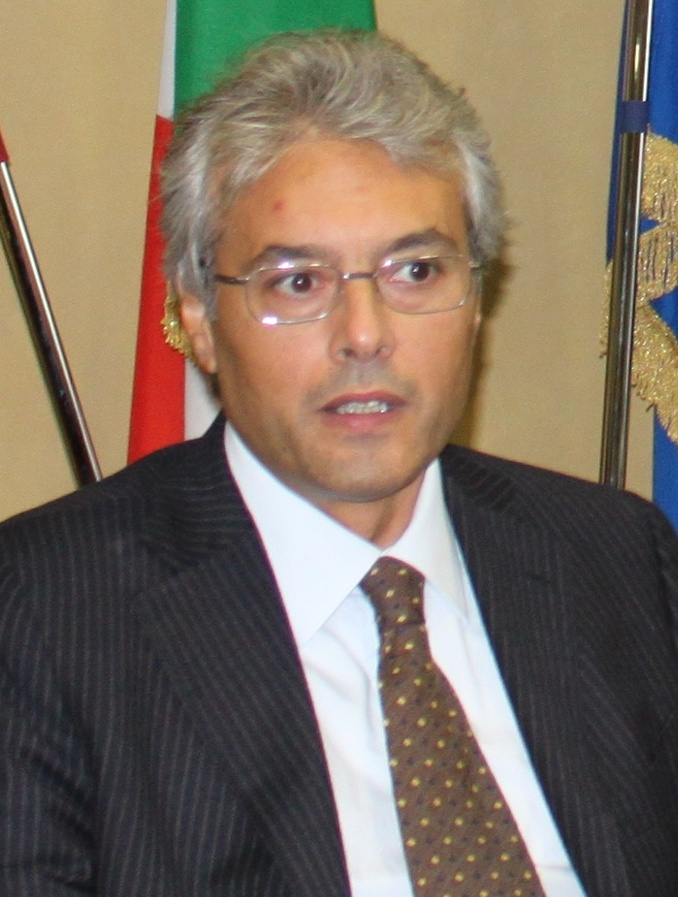

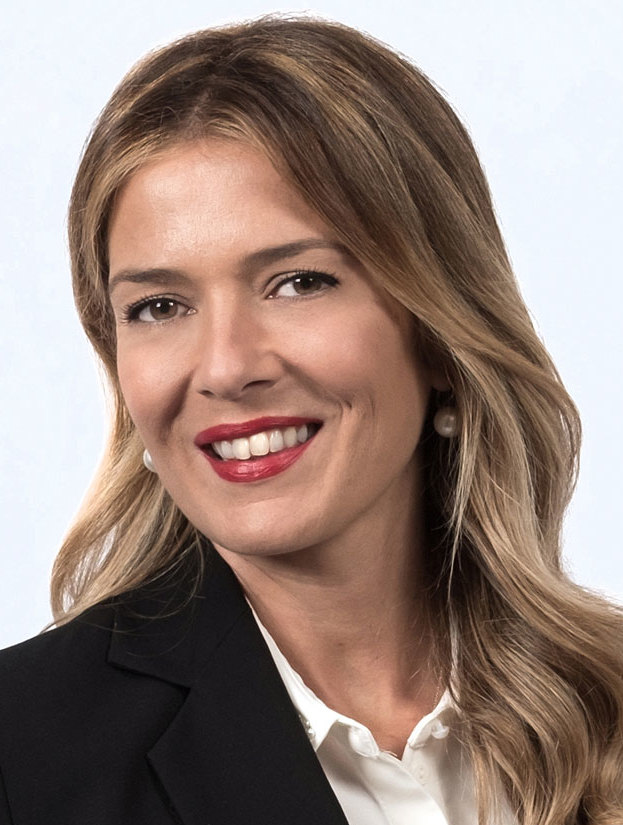
	Majority party	Minority party	Third party
Leader	Luciano D'Alfonso	Giovanni Chiodi	Sara Marcozzi
Party	Democratic Party	Forza Italia	Five Star Movement
Alliance	Centre-left coalition	Centre-right coalition	none
Seats won	18	7	6
Seat change	▲2	▼20	new
Popular vote	319,887	202,346	148,035
Percentage	46.3%	29.3%	21.4%
Swing	▲3.6%	▼19.5%	new
President before election
Giovanni Chiodi
Forza Italia
Elected President
Luciano D'Alfonso
Democratic Party

The Abruzzo regional election of 2014 took place on 25 May 2014.

The Democratic candidate Luciano D'Alfonso, a former Christian Democrat who had been mayor of Pescara in 2003–2009, defeated incumbent President Giovanni Chiodi of Forza Italia by a wide margin.

== Results ==
25 May 2014 Abruzzo regional election results
Candidates	Votes	%	Seats	Parties	Votes	%	Seats
Luciano D'Alfonso	319,887	46.26	1				
Luciano D'Alfonso	319,887	46.26	1	Democratic Party	171,095	25.41	10
Luciano D'Alfonso	319,887	46.26	1	Easy Region	36,996	5.50	2
Luciano D'Alfonso	319,887	46.26	1	Civic Abruzzo (incl. RI and SC)	33,676	5.00	2
Luciano D'Alfonso	319,887	46.26	1	Democratic Centre	16,962	2.52	1
Luciano D'Alfonso	319,887	46.26	1	Left Ecology Freedom	16,151	2.40	1
Luciano D'Alfonso	319,887	46.26	1	Italy of Values (incl. PdCI)	14,306	2.12	1
Luciano D'Alfonso	319,887	46.26	1	Italian Socialist Party	11,666	1.73	–
Luciano D'Alfonso	319,887	46.26	1	Abruzzo Value	11,261	1.67	–
Luciano D'Alfonso	319,887	46.26	1	Total	313,267	46.58	17
Giovanni Chiodi	202,346	29.26	1				
Giovanni Chiodi	202,346	29.26	1	Forza Italia	112,215	16.67	4
Giovanni Chiodi	202,346	29.26	1	New Centre-Right – UDC	40,219	5.98	1
Giovanni Chiodi	202,346	29.26	1	Future Abruzzo	25,210	3.73	1
Giovanni Chiodi	202,346	29.26	1	Brothers of Italy	19,548	2.90	–
Giovanni Chiodi	202,346	29.26	1	Total	197,798	29.41	6
Sara Marcozzi	148,035	21.41	–	Five Star Movement	143,779	21.36	6
Maurizio Acerbo	21,224	3.07	–	Another Region with Acerbo	20,221	3.01	–
Total candidates	691,492	100.00	2	Total parties	672,467	100.00	29
Source: Ministry of the Interior – Historical Archive of Elections
