= Mosciano Sant'Angelo =

- Comune
- Comune di Mosciano Sant'Angelo
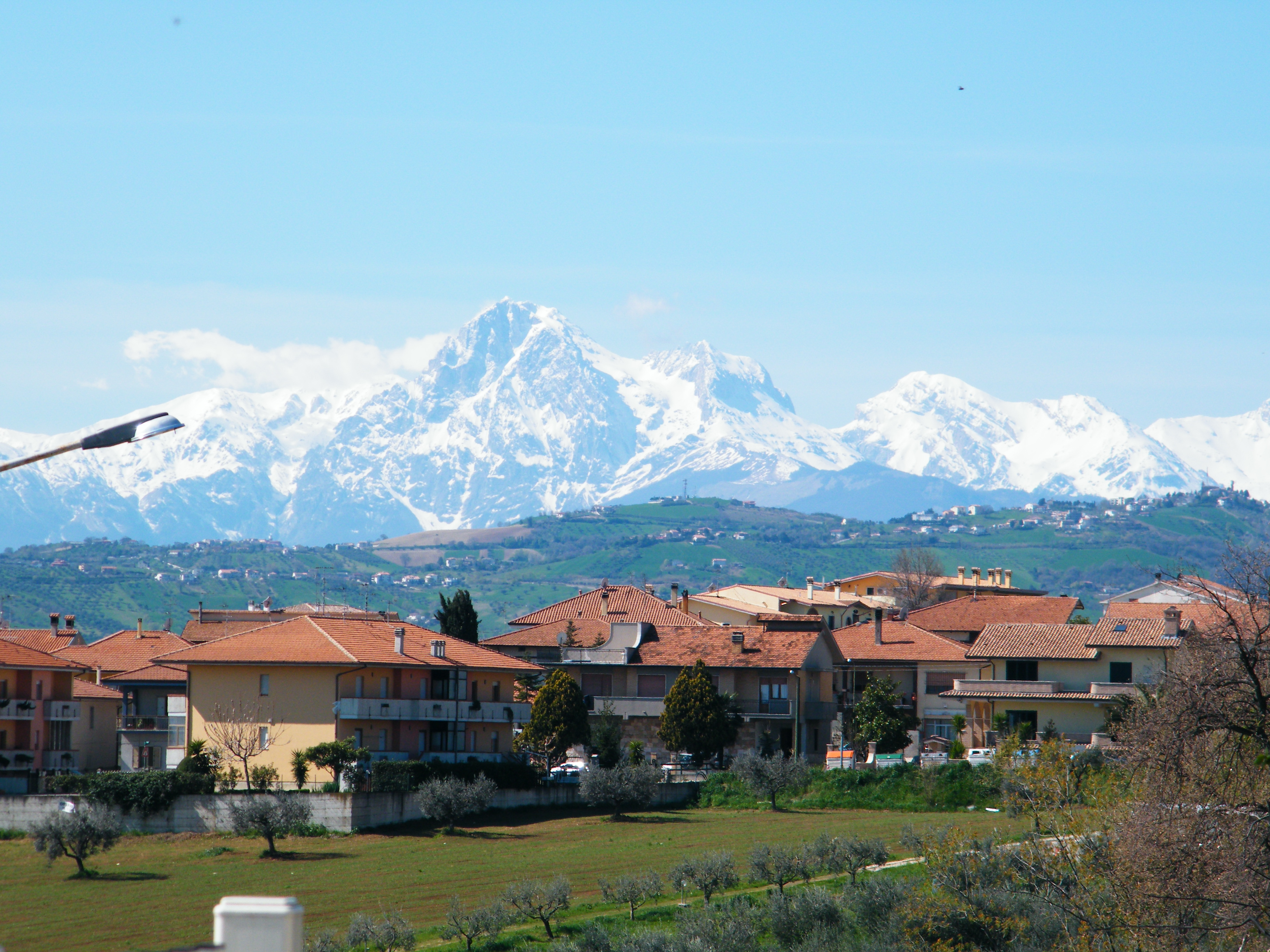

- Coat of arms

- Location within Italy Location within Abruzzo
- Coordinates: 42°45′N 13°53′E
- Country: Italy
- Region: Abruzzo
- Province: Teramo (TE)
- Frazioni: Colle Cacio, Colle Cerreto, Colle Imperatore, Collepietro, Convento, Costa del Monte, Fornaci, Montone, Mosciano Sant'Angelo Stazione, Notaresco stazione, Santa Filomena, Selva Alta

Government
  - Mayor: Giuliano Galiffi (PD)

Area
  - Total: 48.45 km^{2} (18.71 sq mi)
- Elevation: 227 m (745 ft)

Population (31 May 2022)
  - Total: 9,105
  - Density: 187.9/km^{2} (486.7/sq mi)
- Demonym: Moscianesi
- Time zone: UTC+1 (CET)
  - Summer (DST): UTC+2 (CEST)
- Postal code: 64023
- Dialing code: 085
- Website: Official website

Mosciano Sant'Angelo (Moscianese: Mëscià, Muscianë) is a town and comune of the province of Teramo in the Abruzzo region of eastern Italy.

Nearby communes include Bellante, Castellalto, Giulianova, Notaresco, Roseto degli Abruzzi, Sant'Omero, Tortoreto .

== Festivals ==
In July the town holds a jazz festival.

== People ==
- Aurelio Saliceti -politician
