= 1995 Abruzzo regional election =

Regional election in Italy

- 23 April 1995

All 40 seats to the Regional Council of Abruzzo
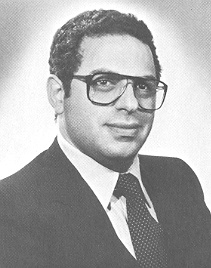

	Majority party	Minority party
Leader	Antonio Falconio	Piergiorgio Landini
Party	PPI	National Alliance
Alliance	Centre-left	Centre-right
Seats won	25	15
Popular vote	381,051	373,101
Percentage	48.2%	47.2%
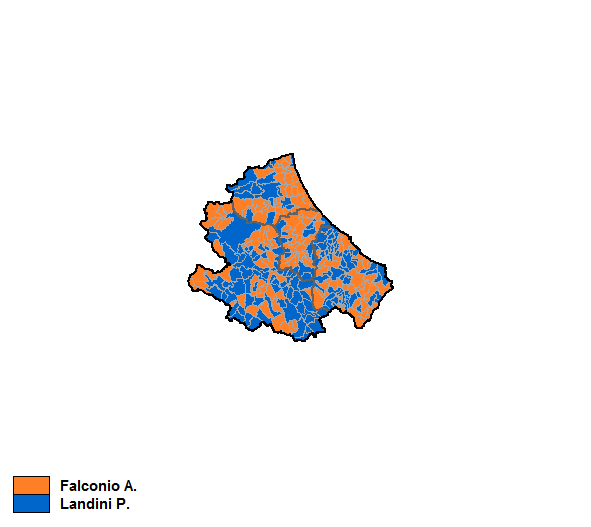
President before election
Vincenzo Del Colle
PPI
President-elect
Antonio Falconio
PPI

The Abruzzo regional election of 1995 took place on 23 April 1995.

For the first time the President of the Region was directly elected by the people, although the election was not yet binding and the President-elect could have been replaced during the term.

Antonio Falconio (Italian People's Party) was elected President of the Region, defeating Piergiorgio Landini (Forza Italia) by a narrow margin.

== Results ==
Candidates	votes	votes (%)	seats reg. list	seats prov. lists
Antonio Falconio	381,051	48.22	8	17
Democratic Party of the Left	173,726	24.13	→	9
Communist Refoundation Party	65,668	9.12	→	3
Italian People's Party	62,597	8.69	→	2
Pact of Democrats	48,395	6.72	→	2
Federation of the Greens	20,886	2.90	→	1
Piergiorgio Landini	373,101	47.21	-	15
Forza Italia – The People's Pole	141,685	19.68	→	7
National Alliance	128,539	17.85	→	6
Christian Democratic Centre	53,745	7.47	→	2
Nicola Cucullo	19,479	2.46	-	-
Tricolour Flame	10,000	1.39	→	-
Riccardo Chiavaroli	16,600	2.10	-	-
Pannella List	14,689	2.04	→	-
Total	790,231	100.00	8	32

Source: Ministry of the Interior
