= 1980 Abruzzo regional election =

Regional election in Italy

The Abruzzo regional election of 1980 took place on 8 June 1980.

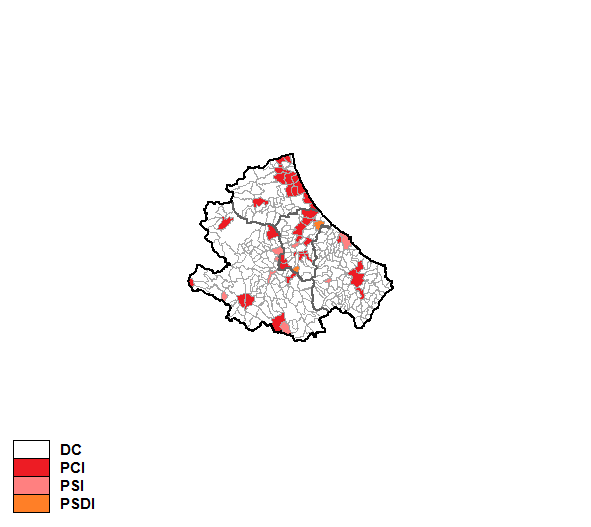
Largest party by municipality

== Events ==
Christian Democracy was by far the largest party, while the Italian Communist Party came distantly second.

After the election Romeo Ricciuti, the incumbent Christian Democratic President, formed a new regional government, but as soon as in 1981, he was replaced by Anna Nenna D'Antonio and later, since 1983, by Felice Spadaccini.

== Results ==
Parties	votes	votes (%)	seats
Christian Democracy	355,246	45.8	20
Italian Communist Party	213,823	27.6	12
Italian Socialist Party	84,132	10.8	4
Italian Social Movement	45,669	5.9	2
Italian Democratic Socialist Party	35,605	4.6	1
Italian Republican Party	18,976	2.4	1
Italian Liberal Party	11,496	1.5	-
Proletarian Unity Party	9,916	1.3	-
Progressive Party of Abruzzo	1,256	0.2	-
Total	776,119	100.0	40

Source: Ministry of the Interior
