= 1990 Abruzzo regional election =

Regional election in Italy

The Abruzzo regional election of 1990 took place on 6 and 7 May 1990.

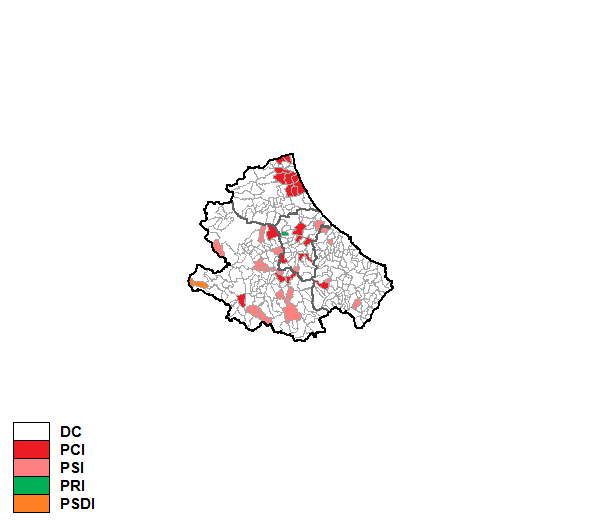
Largest party by municipality

== Events ==
Christian Democracy was by far the largest party, while the Italian Communist Party came distantly second.

After the election Christian Democrat Rocco Salini formed a centre-left government. In 1992 Salini, who was elected to the Italian Parliament, was replaced as president by fellow Christian Democrat Vincenzo Del Colle.

== Results ==
Parties	votes	votes (%)	seats
Christian Democracy	395,036	46.7	20
Italian Communist Party	173,665	20.5	8
Italian Socialist Party	124,102	14.7	6
Italian Social Movement	31,776	3.8	1
Italian Republican Party	28,875	3.4	1
Italian Democratic Socialist Party	23,817	2.8	1
Italian Liberal Party	19,333	2.3	1
Green List	17,622	2.1	1
Antiprohibitionists on Drugs	15,396	1.8	1
Rainbow Greens	7,682	0.9	-
Proletarian Democracy	5,948	0.7	-
Others	3,548	0.4	-
Total	846,800	100.0	40

Source: Ministry of the Interior
