= 2000 Abruzzo regional election =

Regional election in Italy

- 16 April 2000

All 43 seats to the Regional Council of Abruzzo
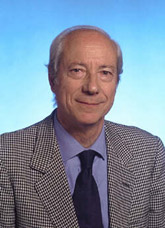

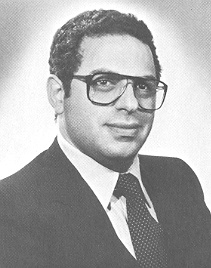
	Majority party	Minority party
Leader	Giovanni Pace	Antonio Falconio
Party	National Alliance	PPI
Alliance	Pole for Freedoms	The Olive Tree
Seats won	26	17
Seat change	▲11	▼8
Popular vote	382,353	378,739
Percentage	49.3%	48.8%
Swing	▲2.1%	▲0.6%
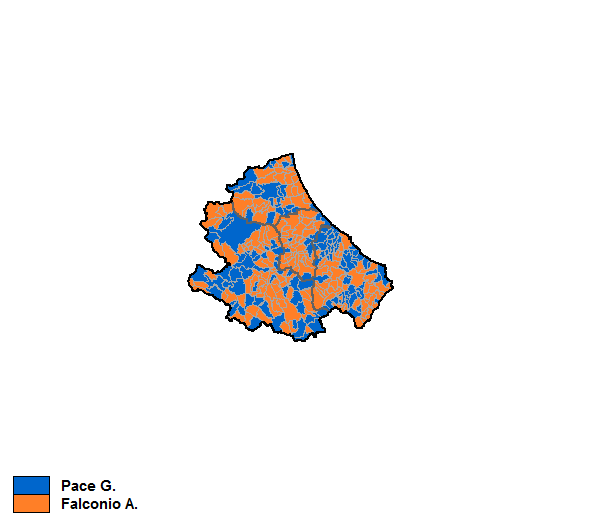
President before election
Antonio Falconio
PPI
President-elect
Giovanni Pace
National Alliance

The Abruzzo regional election of 2000 took place on 16 April 2000.

Giovanni Pace (National Alliance) was narrowly elected President, defeating incumbent Antonio Falconio (Democrats of the Left).

== Results ==
Candidates & parties	votes	votes (%)	seats reg. list	seats prov. lists
Giovanni Pace	382,353	49.26	8	18
Forza Italia	142,197	19.20	→	8
National Alliance	94,139	12.71	→	5
Christian Democratic Centre	55,053	7.43	→	3
United Christian Democrats	25,372	3.43	→	1
Christian Democratic Party	20,294	2.74	→	1
The Liberals Sgarbi	9,761	1.32	→	0
Tricolour Flame	9,586	1.29	→	0
Pact for Abruzzo	8,374	1.13	→	0
Antonio Falconio	378,739	48.80	1	16
Democrats of the Left	148,939	20.11	→	7
Italian People's Party	64,981	8.77	→	3
The Democrats	43,766	5.91	→	2
Italian Democratic Socialists	33,866	4.57	→	1
Communist Refoundation Party	31,692	4.28	→	1
Party of Italian Communists	15,670	2.12	→	1
Union of Democrats for Europe	12,676	1.71	→	1
Federation of the Greens	12,128	1.64	→	0
Luigino Del Gatto	9,380	1.21	-	-
Bonino List	8,042	1.09	→	0
Paolo Vecchioli	5,669	0.73	-	-
National Front	4,185	0.56	→	0
Total	776,171	100.00	9	34

Source: Ministry of the Interior
