= 2019 Abruzzo regional election =

Regional election in Italy

- 10 February 2019

All 31 seats to the Regional Council of Abruzzo
- Turnout: 53.1% (▼8.4%)
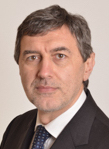

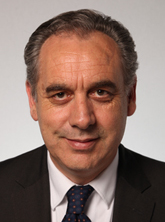

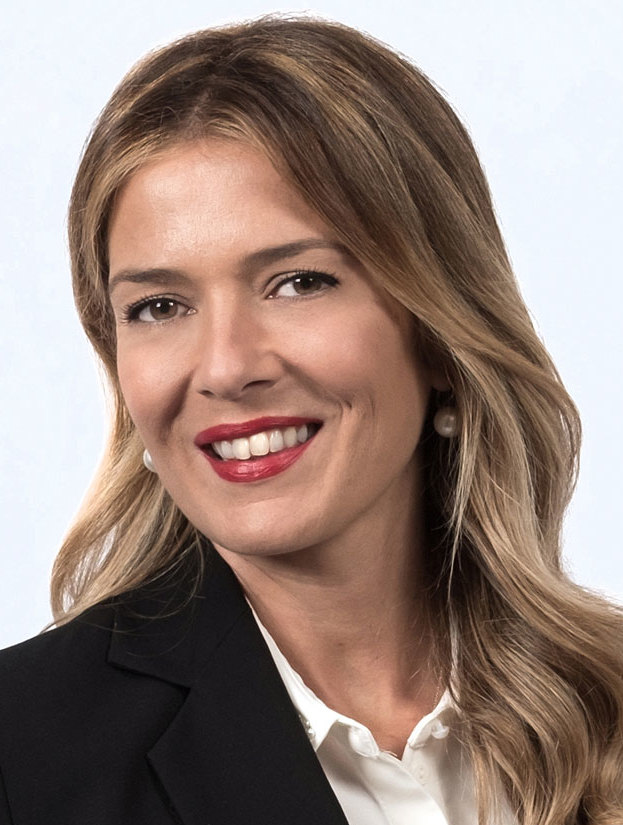
	Majority party	Minority party	Third party
Candidate	Marco Marsilio	Giovanni Legnini	Sara Marcozzi
Party	Brothers of Italy	Democratic Party	Five Star Movement
Alliance	Centre-right	Centre-left
Seats won	18	6	7
Seat change	▲11	▼12	▲1
Popular vote	299,949	195,394	126,165
Percentage	48.0%	31.3%	20.2%
Swing	▲18.7%	▼15.0%	▼1.2%
- Maps of the results of the presidential election and legislative election
President before election
Giovanni Lolli (acting)
PD
Elected President
Marco Marsilio
FdI

The 2019 Abruzzo regional election took place on 10 February 2019. The election was for all 29 elected seats of the Regional Council of Abruzzo as well as the President of the region who, along with the second placed presidential candidate, would also become members of the Regional Council.

The ballot resulted in the election of Marco Marsilio, the centre-right candidate, as President of the Regional Council with 48% of the votes. Moreover, the League won a plurality of seats in the Regional Council.

== Electoral law ==
The candidate who obtains the majority of valid votes at the regional level becomes president. Every candidate must be linked to a party list or a coalition running for the regional council. A majority of 60% to 65% of the seats is then allocated to the party (or coalition) of the elected president.

The election of the Council occurs on a regional basis within the four districts of Abruzzo, coinciding with the four provinces of the Region. The district of Chieti elects eight councilors, while Pescara, L'Aquila and Teramo each elect seven councillors. The President of the Council and the presidential candidate, who received the second largest number of votes, also become members of the regional council.

The electoral system is proportional to the share of the votes each party revives, with an electoral threshold of 4% of the vote for parties that are not members of coalitions and 2% for those included in a coalition.

== Campaign ==
During the campaign, Marco Marsilio (member of FdI) was criticized for not being native to the region, with opponents accusing him of lacking knowledge about the specific regional issues. However Marsilio's parents are both natives of Abruzzo. Members of the Democratic Party (PD) also accused the League of violating Italian campaigning laws, after Matteo Salvini posted a tweet calling on voters to go and vote for his party, during the period of time in which the electoral campaign is officially closed.

== Parties and candidate ==
Political party or alliance	Constituent lists	Previous result		Candidate
Political party or alliance	Constituent lists	Votes (%)	Seats	Candidate
Centre-right coalition	Forza Italia (FI)	16.7	4	Marco Marsilio
Centre-right coalition	Brothers of Italy (FdI)	2.9	–	Marco Marsilio
Centre-right coalition	League (Lega)	—N/a	—N/a	Marco Marsilio
Centre-right coalition	Political Action (AP) (incl. EpI)	—N/a	—N/a	Marco Marsilio
Centre-right coalition	Union of the Centre–Christian Democracy–IdeA – NcI	—N/a	—N/a	Marco Marsilio
Centre-left coalition	Democratic Party (PD)	25.4	10	Giovanni Legnini
Centre-left coalition	Legnini for President	—N/a	—N/a	Giovanni Legnini
Centre-left coalition	Progressives–Free and Equal	—N/a	—N/a	Giovanni Legnini
Centre-left coalition	More Abruzzo–Democratic Centre (incl. AP)	—N/a	—N/a	Giovanni Legnini
Centre-left coalition	Forward Abruzzo–Italy of Values (incl. PSI and CP)	—N/a	—N/a	Giovanni Legnini
Centre-left coalition	Abruzzo in Common–Easy Region	—N/a	—N/a	Giovanni Legnini
Centre-left coalition	Centrists for Europe (CpE)	—N/a	—N/a	Giovanni Legnini
Centre-left coalition	Abruzzo Together–Future Abruzzo	—N/a	—N/a	Giovanni Legnini
Five Star Movement (M5S)		21.4	6	Sara Marcozzi
CasaPound (CPI)		—N/a	—N/a	Stefano Flajani

== Opinion polls ==
Date	Polling firm	Legnini	Marsilio	Marcozzi	Others	Lead
21–24 Jan 2019	SWG	30%	37%	32%	1%	5%
20–22 Nov 2018	Quorum – YouTrend	23%	38%	35%	4%	3%

== Results ==
10 February 2019 Abruzzo regional election results
Candidates	Votes	%	Seats	Parties	Votes	%	Seats
Marco Marsilio	299,949	48.03	1	League	165,008	27.53	10
Marco Marsilio	299,949	48.03	1	Forza Italia	54,223	9.04	3
Marco Marsilio	299,949	48.03	1	Brothers of Italy	38,894	6.48	2
Marco Marsilio	299,949	48.03	1	Political Action	19,446	3.24	1
Marco Marsilio	299,949	48.03	1	UdC – DC – IdeA – NcI	17,308	2.88	1
Marco Marsilio	299,949	48.03	1	Total	294,879	49.19	17
Giovanni Legnini	195,394	31.28	1	Democratic Party	66,796	11.14	3
Giovanni Legnini	195,394	31.28	1	Legnini for President	33,277	5.55	1
Giovanni Legnini	195,394	31.28	1	Abruzzo in Common – Easy Region	23,168	3.86	1
Giovanni Legnini	195,394	31.28	1	Progressives – Free and Equal	16,614	2.77	–
Giovanni Legnini	195,394	31.28	1	Abruzzo Together – Future Abruzzo	16,055	2.67	–
Giovanni Legnini	195,394	31.28	1	More Abruzzo – Democratic Centre	14,198	2.36	–
Giovanni Legnini	195,394	31.28	1	Centrists for Europe	7,938	1.32	–
Giovanni Legnini	195,394	31.28	1	Forward Abruzzo – Italy of Values	5,611	0.93	–
Giovanni Legnini	195,394	31.28	1	Total	183,630	30.63	5
Sara Marcozzi	126,125	20.20	–	Five Star Movement	118,273	19.73	7
Stefano Flajani	2,974	0.47	–	CasaPound	2,560	0.42	–
Invalid votes	18,808	–					
Total candidates	624,482	100.00	2	Total parties	599,356	100.00	29
Registered voters	1,211,204	53.11					
Source: Ministry of the Interior – Results

Popular vote
Lega	27.53%
M5S	19.73%
PD	11.14%
FI	9.04%
FdI	6.48%
Leginini List	5.55%
AIC	3.86%
AP	3.24%
UDC–IdeA–DC	2.88%
LeU	2.77%
IA–AF	2.67%
Others	5.03%

President
Marsilio	48.03%
Legnini	31.28%
Marcozzi	20.20%
Flajani	0.47%

=== Voter turnout ===
Region	Time		
Region	12:00	19:00	23:00
Abruzzo	13.42%	43.00%	53.11%
Province	Time		
Province	12:00	19:00	23:00
Chieti	13.17%	40.46%	50.17%
L'Aquila	13.01%	44.56%	54.70%
Pescara	14.13%	43.98%	54.83%
Teramo	13.45%	43.96%	53.84%
Source: Ministry of the Interior – Turnout
