= 1975 Abruzzo regional election =

Regional election in Italy

The Abruzzo regional election of 1975 took place on 15 June 1975.

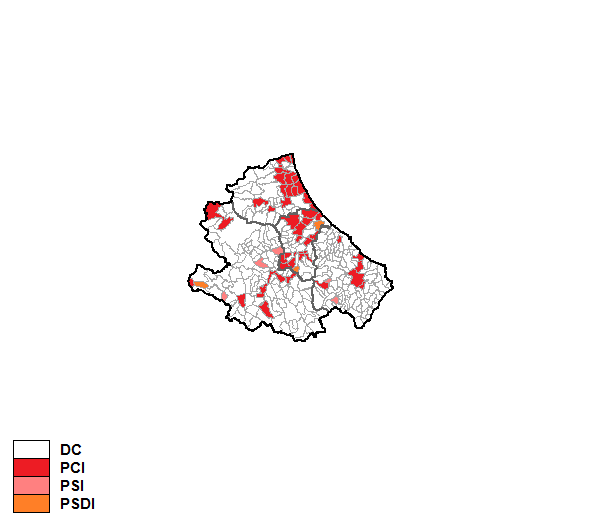
Largest party by municipality

== Events ==
Christian Democracy was by far the largest party, while the Italian Communist Party came distantly second.

After the election Christian Democrat Felice Spadaccini was elected President of the Region, but was replaced by partymate Romeo Ricciuti in 1977.

== Results ==
Parties	votes	votes (%)	seats
Christian Democracy	323,207	42.5	18
Italian Communist Party	230,680	30.3	13
Italian Socialist Party	77,480	10.2	4
Italian Social Movement	49,021	6.5	2
Italian Democratic Socialist Party	46,981	6.2	2
Italian Republican Party	19,705	2.6	1
Italian Liberal Party	13,434	1.8	-
Total	760,508	100.0	40

Source: Ministry of the Interior
