= 1985 Abruzzo regional election =

Regional election in Italy

The Abruzzo regional election of 1985 took place on 12 May 1985.

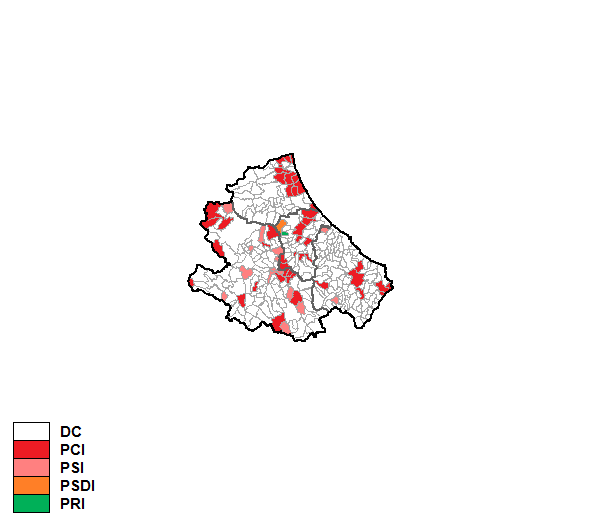
Largest party by municipality

== Events ==
Christian Democracy was by far the largest party, while the Italian Communist Party came distantly second.

After the election Christian Democrat Emilio Mattucci formed a centre-left government (Pentapartito).

== Results ==
| Parties | votes | votes (%) | seats |
|---|---|---|---|
| Christian Democracy | 367,300 | 44.3 | 19 |
| Italian Communist Party | 223,446 | 26.9 | 11 |
| Italian Socialist Party | 97,464 | 11.8 | 5 |
| Italian Social Movement | 51,223 | 6.2 | 2 |
| Italian Democratic Socialist Party | 31,678 | 3.8 | 1 |
| Italian Republican Party | 23,399 | 2.8 | 1 |
| Italian Liberal Party | 13,280 | 1.6 | 1 |
| Green List | 9,956 | 1.2 | - |
| Proletarian Democracy | 6,466 | 0.8 | - |
| Pensioners' Italian Alliance – Liga Veneta | 2,694 | 0.3 | - |
| Valdostan Union – Democratic Party – Others | 1,442 | 0.2 | - |
| Pensioners' National Party | 1,140 | 0.1 | - |
| Total | 829,488 | 100.0 | 40 |

Source: Ministry of the Interior
