= 1970 Abruzzo regional election =

Regional election in Italy

The Abruzzo regional election of 1970 took place on 7–8 June 1970.

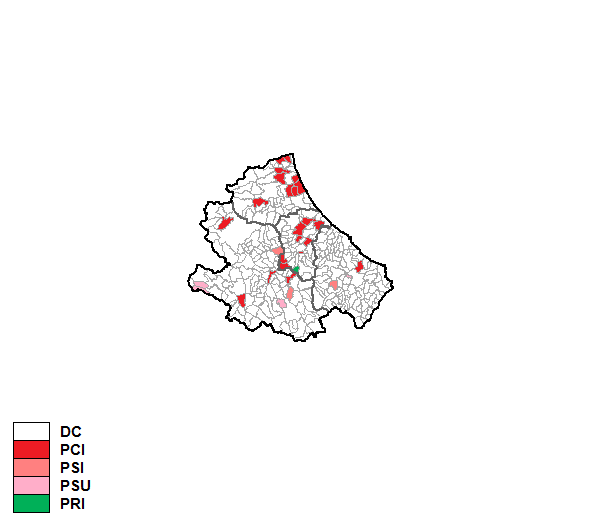
Largest party by municipality

== Events ==
Christian Democracy was by far the largest party, gaining more than twice the share of vote of the Italian Communist Party, which came distantly second. The position of President of Abruzzo was held by Ugo Crescenzi (1970–1972), Giustino De Cecco (1972–1973), Ugo Crescenzi (1973–1974) and again Ugo Crescenzi (1974–1975), all Christian Democrats.

== Results ==
Parties	votes	votes (%)	seats
Christian Democracy	325,644	48.3	20
Italian Communist Party	153,854	22.8	10
Italian Socialist Party	60,507	9.0	3
Italian Social Movement	38,863	5.8	2
Unitary Socialist Party	36,831	5.5	2
Italian Socialist Party of Proletarian Unity	21,567	3.2	1
Italian Liberal Party	19,377	2.9	1
Italian Republican Party	16,983	2.5	1
Italian Democratic Party of Monarchist Unity	1,313	0.2	-
Total	674,939	100.0	40

Source: Ministry of the Interior
