= Rocco Salini =

Italian physician and politician

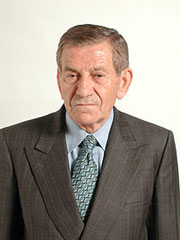

President of Abruzzo
- In office 1 August 1990 – 13 October 1992
- Preceded by: Emilio Mattucci
- Succeeded by: Vincenzo Del Colle

Member of the Senate of the Republic
- In office 29 May 2001 – 28 April 2006

President of the Province of Teramo
- In office 1980–1985
- Preceded by: Gabriele Serroni
- Succeeded by: Simone Marini

Personal details
- Born: 24 February 1931 Cellino Attanasio, Province of Teramo, Kingdom of Italy
- Died: 2 December 2016 (aged 85) Chieti, Abruzzo, Italy
- Party: DC (until 1994); FI (1994–2005); UDEUR (2005–2008); DC (2008–2013)
- Spouse: Bruna
- Children: Two

Rocco Salini (24 February 1931 – 2 December 2016) was an Italian physician and politician who served as the President of the region of Abruzzo from 1990 to 1992. He also served a Senator from 2001 to 2006, as well as the Undersecretary of Health briefly for just one month within the second government of then-Prime Minister Silvio Berlusconi. A physician by profession, Salini was a member of the Senate committee on health and hygiene.

== Career ==
Salini, who was born in 1931, was originally from Castilenti, where he worked as a doctor. He began his political as a Teramo councilor for the Christian Democrats (DC).

Salini was elected President of the Abruzzo region from 1990 to 1992. He and his government were forced to resign in 1992 due to a corruption scandal over the misuse of European Union funds. He received a sentence of one year and four months for abuse of office and misrepresentation.

Rocco Salini returned to politics in 2000 when he was elected as a Forza Italia regional councilor. He was next elected to the Italian Senate from 2001 to 2006. He also briefly served as the Undersecretary of the Ministry of Health, under Silvio Berlusconi, for just one month.

Salini died in a hospital in Chieti on 2 December 2016, at the age of 85 after being hospitalized for about one month. He was survived by his wife, Bruna, and two children, Vincenzo and Luisa.
