= 2005 Abruzzo regional election =

Regional election in Italy

- 3–4 April 2005

All 40 seats to the Regional Council of Abruzzo
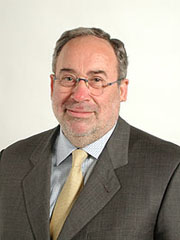

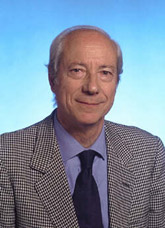
	Majority party	Minority party
Leader	Ottaviano Del Turco	Giovanni Pace
Party	SDI	National Alliance
Alliance	The Union	House of Freedoms
Seats won	27	13
Seat change	▲10	▼13
Popular vote	446,407	311,547
Percentage	58.2%	40.7%
Swing	▲9.4%	▼8.8%
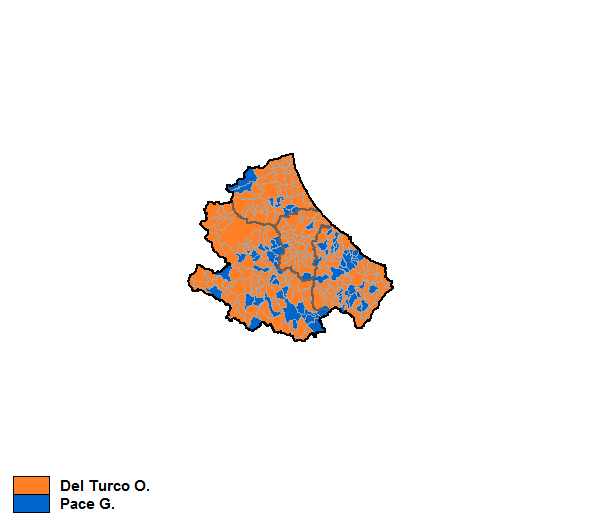
President before election
Giovanni Pace
National Alliance
President-elect
Ottaviano Del Turco
SDI

The Abruzzo regional election of 2005 took place on 3–4 April 2005.

Ottaviano Del Turco (Italian Democratic Socialists, then Democratic Party) defeated incumbent Giovanni Pace (National Alliance) by a landslide.

== Results ==
Candidates & parties	votes	votes (%)	seats reg. list	seats prov. lists
Ottaviano Del Turco	446,407	58.24	8	19
Democrats of the Left	136,430	18.60	→	6
Democracy is Freedom – The Daisy	122,764	16.73	→	6
Italian Democratic Socialists	38,221	5.21	→	2
Communist Refoundation Party	36,008	4.91	→	1
UDEUR	34,735	4.73	→	1
Party of Italian Communists	21,641	2.95	→	1
Italy of Values	17,982	2.45	→	1
Federation of the Greens	14,728	2.01	→	1
Italian Democratic Socialist Party	2,346	0.32	→	0
Giovanni Pace	311,547	40.65	1	12
Forza Italia	117,287	15.99	→	5
National Alliance	82,068	11.19	→	3
Union of Christian and Centre Democrats	61,761	8.42	→	3
Christian Democracy	20,462	2.79	→	1
Moderates and Reformists	8,509	1.16	→	0
New PSI–PRI–PLI	7,035	0.96	→	0
Social Idea Movement	5,213	0.71	→	0
Fabrizio Bosio	8,517	1.11	-	-
Social Alternative	6,468	0.88	→	0
Total	766,471	100.00	9	31

Source: Ministry of the Interior
