= Giovanni Pace =

Italian politician and accountant (1933–2018)

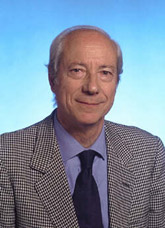

President of Abruzzo
- In office 18 May 2000 – 22 April 2005
- Preceded by: Antonio Falconio
- Succeeded by: Ottaviano Del Turco

Member of the Chamber of Deputies
- In office 15 April 1994 – 19 April 2000

Personal details
- Born: 18 November 1933 Chieti, Abruzzo, Kingdom of Italy
- Died: 19 May 2018 (aged 84) Chieti, Abruzzo, Italy
- Party: AN (1995–2009)
- Other political affiliations: MSI (until 1995)

Giovanni Pace (18 November 1933 – 19 May 2018) was an Italian accountant and politician.

Pace was born and raised in the city of Chieti. He and Nicola Cucullo studied business and economics together at university.

Pace worked as an accountant and helped establish a branch of the Italian Social Movement in Abruzzo. From 1960 to 1975, Pace served on the Chieti municipal council as a member of the MSI. Between 1990 and 1993, Pace was city auditor. He won election to the Chamber of Deputies in 1994 but ran for reelection in 1996 under the National Alliance banner. Pace, representing House of Freedoms coalition, was narrowly elected President of Abruzzo in 2000, and held office until 2005 election.

Pace died in Chieti on 19 May 2018 at the age of 84.
