= 2008 Abruzzo regional election =

Regional election in Italy

- 14–15 December 2008

All 45 seats to the Regional Council of Abruzzo
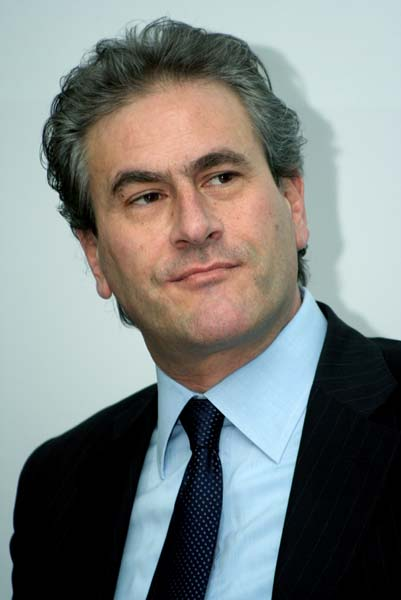
	Majority party	Minority party
Leader	Giovanni Chiodi	Carlo Costantini
Party	People of Freedom	IdV
Alliance	Centre-right	Centre-left
Seats won	27	16
Seat change	▲14	▼11
Popular vote	295,371	258,199
Percentage	48.8%	42.7%
Swing	▲8.1%	▼15.5%
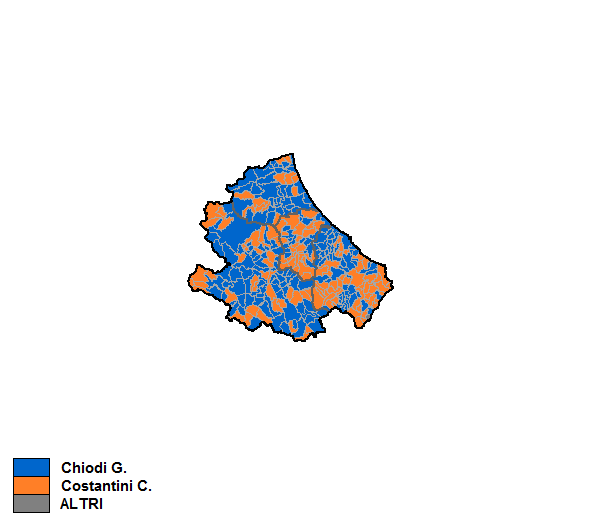
President before election
Ottaviano Del Turco
Democratic Party
President-elect
Giovanni Chiodi
People of Freedom

The Abruzzo regional election of 2008 took place on 14–15 December 2008, due to the early resignation of President Ottaviano Del Turco, after his indictment for alleged corruption. The election was to take place on 30 November–1 December, but was postponed because of legal issues over the ammission of the list of For the Common Good.

The candidate of The People of Freedom (PdL) was Giovanni Chiodi, a former mayor of Teramo. The PdL rejected any alliance with the Union of the Centre (UDC) and The Right in order to strengthen its goal of becoming a majority force free from the blackmails of small "old politics" parties.

On the centre-left, local and national leaders of Democratic Party (PD) tried to produce a joint candidate with Italy of Values (IdV) and UDC, but IdV said that an alliance with the PD was possible only if the PD would have supported their own candidate, Carlo Constantini. IdV was even tempted by running a solitary campaign: Abruzzo was in fact a stronghold for the party, whose leader Antonio Di Pietro came from neighbouring Molise. However, in late October, the PD agreed to support Costantini at the head of a large centre-left coalition, comprising also the Communist Refoundation Party (PRC), the Party of Italian Communists (PdCI), the Federation of the Greens and the Socialist Party (PS).

The PD tried to woo also the UDC in the centre-left coalition, but the UDC refused any alliance with populist IdV and decided to run its own candidate, Rodolfo De Laurentiis. Teodoro Buontempo was the candidate of The Right.

On election day Gianni Chiodi defeated Carlo Costantini. The election was a major defeat for the PD, while IdV had a very good result, despite the poor showing of its candidate, who won fewer votes than its supporting parties.

== Results ==
Candidates & parties	votes	votes (%)	seats reg. list	seats prov. lists
Giovanni Chiodi	295,371	48.81	8	19
The People of Freedom	190,919	35.19	→	15
Raise Abruzzo! (Future Abruzzo–DC–LD–PRI)	40,256	7.42	→	3
Movement for Autonomy	18,040	3.32	→	1
Liberal Socialists	7,753	1.43	→	0
Carlo Costantini	258,199	42.67	1	15
Democratic Party	106,410	19.61	→	7
Italy of Values	81,557	15.03	→	5
Communist Refoundation Party	15,435	2.84	→	1
Federation of the Greens–Democratic Left	12,054	2.22	→	1
Party of Italian Communists	9,955	1.83	→	1
Socialist Party	9,387	1.73	→	-
Democrats for Abruzzo	7,507	1.38	→	-
Rodolfo De Laurentiis	32,604	5.39	-	2
Union of the Centre–UDEUR	30,452	5.61	→	2
Teodoro Buontempo	11,514	1.90	-	-
The Right	9,597	1.77	→	0
Ilaria Del Biondo	6,625	0.76	-	-
Workers' Communist Party	2,018	0.37	→	0
Angelo Di Prospero	2,791	0.46	-	-
For the Common Good	1,237	0.23	→	0
Total	605,104	100.00	9	36

Source: Ministry of the Interior
