= Luciano D'Alfonso =

Italian politician (born 1965)

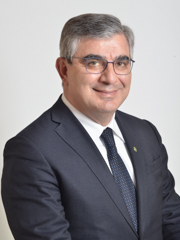

Member of the Chamber of Deputies
- Incumbent
- Assumed office 13 October 2022
- Constituency: Abruzzo

Member of the Senate
- In office 23 March 2018 – 13 October 2022
- Constituency: Abruzzo

President of Abruzzo
- In office 10 June 2014 – 10 August 2018
- Preceded by: Giovanni Chiodi
- Succeeded by: Marco Marsilio

Mayor of Pescara
- In office 10 June 2003 – 5 January 2009
- Preceded by: Carlo Pace
- Succeeded by: Luigi Albore Mascia

President of the Province of Pescara
- In office 8 May 1995 – 14 June 1999
- Preceded by: Fortunato Di Sipio
- Succeeded by: Giuseppe De Dominicis

Personal details
- Born: 13 December 1965 (age 60) Lettomanoppello, Italy
- Party: DC (until 1994); PPI (1994–2002); DL (2002–2007); PD (since 2007)
- Education: University of Teramo; D'Annunzio University
- Occupation: Politician

Luciano D'Alfonso (born 13 December 1965) is an Italian politician, a member of the Chamber of Deputies since 2022. He was the mayor of Pescara from 2003 to 2009. He served as the president of Abruzzo from 2014 to 2018, and as a senator from 2018 to 2022.

== Biography ==
D'Alfonso graduated in political sciences, in law and in administration sciences at the University of Teramo and in Philosophy at the D'Annunzio University of Chieti–Pescara.

In 1995, he was elected president of the Province of Pescara, supported by the centre-left coalition of The Olive Tree.

In June 2003, D'Alfonso was elected Mayor of Pescara and was re-confirmed in 2008, though he left the office in January 2009 due to an investigation in which he was involved.

In May 2014, D'Alfonso was elected President of Abruzzo, supported by the Democratic Party, defeating the incumbent governor Giovanni Chiodi. After the 2018 general election, D'Alfonso was elected to the Senate: in August 2018, D'Alfonso resigned from his gubernatorial seat.
