= Antonio Falconio =

Italian politician (1938–2021)

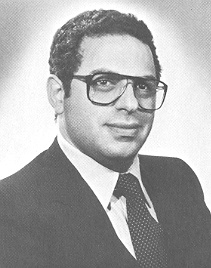

President of Abruzzo
- In office 8 June 1995 – 9 May 2000
- Preceded by: Vincenzo Del Colle
- Succeeded by: Giovanni Pace

Member of the Chamber of Deputies of Italy
- In office 15 June 1979 – 11 July 1983
- Constituency: Constituency of L'Aquila-Pescara-Chieti-Teramo

Personal details
- Born: 26 May 1938 Navelli, Italy
- Died: 22 December 2021 (aged 83) Rome, Italy
- Party: DC (until 1994); PPI (1994–2002); UdC (since 2002)

Antonio Falconio (26 May 1938 – 22 December 2021) was an Italian politician. A member of the Christian Democracy party and later the Italian People's Party, he served in the Chamber of Deputies from 1979 to 1983 and was President of Abruzzo from 1995 to 2000.

Falconio died on 22 December 2021, at the age of 83.

== Biography ==
Born in 1938 in Navelli, he earned a degree in political science. He became a professional journalist in 1966 and joined RAI after writing for several daily newspapers. He also served as editor-in-chief of the weekly magazine La Discussione.

He was married, had a son and a daughter, and lived first in L'Aquila and then in Rome. He died there on December 22, 2021, at the age of 83.
