= Ottaviano Del Turco =

Italian politician (1944–2024)

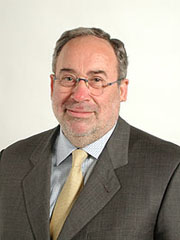
- Del Turco in 2001

President of Abruzzo
- In office 22 April 2005 – 13 July 2008
- Preceded by: Giovanni Pace
- Succeeded by: Giovanni Chiodi

Minister of Finance
- In office 26 April 2000 – 11 June 2001
- Prime Minister: Giuliano Amato
- Preceded by: Vincenzo Visco
- Succeeded by: Giulio Tremonti (Economy and Finance)

Member of the European Parliament
- In office 20 July 2004 – 1 May 2005
- Constituency: Southern Italy

Member of the Senate of the Republic
- In office 9 May 1996 – 19 July 2004
- Constituency: Tuscany (1996–2001); Abruzzo (2001–2004)

Member of the Chamber of Deputies
- In office 15 April 1994 – 8 May 1996
- Constituency: San Lazzaro di Savena

Personal details
- Born: 7 November 1944 Collelongo, Italy
- Died: 22 August 2024 (aged 79) Collelongo, Italy
- Party: PSI (till 1994); SI (1994–1998); SDI (1998–2007); PD (2007–2024)
- Profession: Trade unionist

Ottaviano Del Turco (7 November 1944 – 22 August 2024) was an Italian politician.

== Biography ==
=== Early life ===
Del Turco was born in Collelongo on 7 November 1944.

=== Career ===
After a career in trade unionism in the Italian General Confederation of Labour (CGIL), Del Turco rose to the top of Bettino Craxi's Italian Socialist Party (PSI) before it was swept away in the Tangentopoli scandals of 1992–94. Del Turco was the president of the Antimafia Commission from December 1996 to May 2000. He was Minister of Finance in the cabinet led by the then prime minister Giuliano Amato from 2000 to 2001.

He was elected to the European Parliament in 2004 on the Italian Democratic Socialists (SDI) ticket and sat with the Party of European Socialists group. On 20 July 2004, he was elected chair of the committee on employment and social affairs at the parliament.

On 4 April 2005, he won the election as president of his native Abruzzo as candidate for centre-left coalition The Union, and on 1 May resigned his seat in the European Parliament to take up this post. In 2007, he founded the Reformist Alliance (Italian: Alleanza Riformista) movement within the SDI, with which he left the SDI and became a member of the Democratic Party (Partito Democratico, PD) at the PD's founding congress on 14 October 2007. He was a member of the 45-strong national council. On 16 July 2008, he resigned as President of Abruzzo, and left the national council of the PD.

=== Death ===
Del Turco died in Collelongo on 22 August 2024, at the age of 79.

== Legal issues ==
On 14 July 2008, Del Turco was arrested on suspicion of involvement in a €12.8 million fraud in the financing of the public health system of his region. He was not charged with a crime, but was suspected of corruption and criminal association, prosecutors said. He was among 10 people arrested or placed under house arrest.

Del Turco was sentenced to nine and a half years in prison for his involvement in the exchange of health sector bribes. He was convicted by a court in the city of Pescara on Monday 22 July 2013. The sentencing was in connection with a major €15 million (US$19 million) fraud in the financing of the public health system. In addition to the jail term, he was ordered to pay more than €3 million in damages and given a lifetime ban on holding public office.

== Electoral history ==
Election	House	Constituency	Party	Votes	Result	Notes
1994	Chamber of Deputies	San Lazzaro di Savena	PSI	46,472	Elected	
1996	Senate of the Republic	Tuscany – Grosseto	SI	89,141	Elected	
2001	Senate of the Republic	Abruzzo – L'Aquila	SDI	60,446	Elected	
2004	European Parliament	Southern Italy	SDI	174,598	Elected	

Political offices
Preceded by Vincenzo Visco	Italian Minister of Finance; 2000–2001	Succeeded by Giulio Tremonti (Economy and Finance)
