= Marco Marsilio =

Italian politician

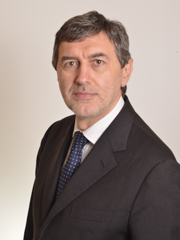

President of Abruzzo
- Incumbent
- Assumed office 23 February 2019
- Preceded by: Luciano D'Alfonso; Giovanni Lolli (ad interim)

Member of the Senate
- In office 23 March 2018 – 19 March 2019
- Succeeded by: Nicola Calandrini

Member of the Chamber of Deputies
- In office 29 April 2008 – 14 March 2013

Personal details
- Born: 17 February 1968 (age 58) Rome, Italy
- Party: MSI (till 1995); AN (1995-2009); PdL (2009-2012); FdI (since 2012)
- Education: Sapienza University of Rome
- Occupation: Politician, Academic

Marco Marsilio (born 17 February 1968) has been President of Abruzzo since 23 February 2019.

== Biography ==
Born in Rome to parents from Tocco da Casauria, Abruzzo, Marsilio graduated in Philosophy at the Sapienza University of Rome and taught Aesthetics, Museology and Marketing applied to Cultural Heritage at the Link Campus University. Between the 1980s and the 1990s, Marsilio took part in student movements and joined the youth movement of National Alliance and was elected to the city council of Rome from 1997 to 2008 for 3 consecutive terms (1997–2001, 2001–2006, 2006–2008). In the 2008 election, Marsilio was elected to the Chamber of Deputies with The People of Freedom, leaving the Silvio Berlusconi's party in December 2012 when he took part in founding the national-conservative party Brothers of Italy led by Giorgia Meloni. Marsilio tried to seek re-election for the Chamber of Deputies in the 2013 election, but failed. In the 2018 election, Marsilio was elected to the Senate, joining the Brothers of Italy faction.

At the end of 2018, Ignazio La Russa advanced Marsilio's candidacy for the office of President of Abruzzo, the native region of both his parents. Despite Marsilio being born and raised in Rome, his candidacy gained support from the entire centre-right coalition, leading to his victory at the 2019 regional election. On 19 March 2019 Marsilio resigned from the Senate in favour of Nicola Calandrini, a member of Brothers of Italy.
