= Giovanni Chiodi =

Italian politician (born 1961)

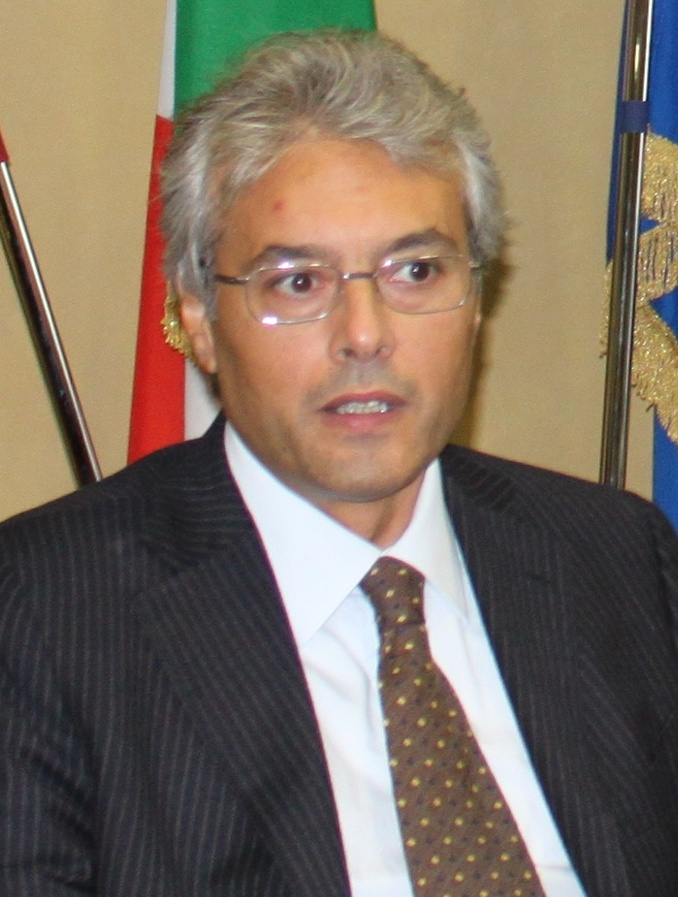

President of Abruzzo
- In office 3 January 2009 – 10 June 2014
- Preceded by: Ottaviano Del Turco
- Succeeded by: Luciano D'Alfonso

Mayor of Teramo
- In office 14 June 2004 – 28 July 2008
- Preceded by: Angelo Sperandio
- Succeeded by: Maurizio Brucchi

Personal details
- Born: 25 April 1961 (age 65) Teramo, Italy
- Party: Forza Italia (till 2009); PdL (2009–2013); Forza Italia (2013–2015); IDeA (2015-2021); CI (since 2021)
- Education: LUISS Guido Carli
- Occupation: Politician, chartered accountant

Giovanni Chiodi (born 25 April 1961) is an Italian politician. He was the Mayor of Teramo from 2004 to 2008. He has served as President of Abruzzo from 2009 to 2014.

== Biography ==
Chiodi graduated in Economy at the LUISS University and began his career as a chartered accountant.

In 1999, Chiodi entered politics as the Pole for Freedoms candidate for the seat of Mayor of Teramo, but loses against The Olive Tree candidate and incumbent Mayor Angelo Sperandio.

In 2004, Chiodi tries once again to run for Mayor of Teramo and wins, gaining the support of the whole House of Freedoms coalition; he left the office in December 2008, in order to run for the office of President of Abruzzo, winning the electoral competition.

In 2014, Chiodi tried to seek a second term, but was defeated by the Democratic Party candidate Luciano D'Alfonso.
