= Carles (name) =

Carles (Eastern Catalan: [ˈkaɾləs]) is a Catalan given name of Germanic origin that is a form of Charles. It is also a surname. Notable people with this name include the following:

== Given name ==
- Carles Aleñá (born 1998), Spanish footballer
- Carles Benavent (born 1954), Spanish flamenco and jazz bassist
- Carles Blasi Vidal (born 1964), Andorran politician
- Carles Boix (born 1962), Spanish political scientist
- Carles Buïgas (1898–1979), Spanish architect, engineer, inventor and author
- Carles Busquets (born 1967), Spanish footballer
- Carles Campuzano (born 1964), Spanish politician
- Carles Canut (1944–2018), Spanish actor
- Carles Casagemas (1880–1901), Spanish painter and poet
- Carles Castillejo (born 1978), Spanish long-distance athlete
- Carles Castillo (born 1975), Spanish politician
- Carles Comamala (1887–1976), Spanish orthopedic surgeon and footballer
- Carles Congost (born 1970), Spanish artist
- Carles Coto (born 1988), Spanish footballer
- Carles Cuadrat (born 1968), Spanish footballer, coach and manager
- Carles Delclaux Is (born 1951), Spanish textile artist
- Carles Fages de Climent (1902–1968), Spanish writer, poet and journalist
- Carles Font-Rossell (born 1967), Andorran diplomat and ambassador
- Carles Francino (born 1958), Spanish journalist
- Carles Gil (born 1992), Spanish footballer
- Carles Poch Gradin (born 1982), Spanish tennis player
- Carles Juanmartí (born 1978), Spanish canoeist
- Carles Lalueza-Fox (born 1965), Spanish biologist
- Carles Lerín (born 1962), Swiss-born Spanish modern pentathlete
- Carles Magraner, Spanish musician
- Carles Marco (born 1974), Spanish basketball player
- Carles Marc Martínez Embuena (born 1988), Spanish footballer
- Carles Mas (born 1993), Spanish footballer
- Carles Mundó (born 1976), Spanish politician
- Carles Pérez (born 1998), Spanish footballer
- Carles Planas (born 1991), Spanish footballer
- Carles Puigdemont (born 1962), Spanish politician
- Carles Puyol (born 1978), Spanish footballer
- Carles Quilmetas (1775–1834), Spanish composer
- Carles Rexach (born 1947), Spanish footballer and manager
- Carles Riba (1893–1959), Spanish poet, writer and translator
- Carles Riera i Albert (born 1960), Spanish sociologist and politician
- Carles Sabater (1962–1999), Spanish singer and actor
- Carles Sans (born 1975), Spanish water polo
- Carles Santos (1940–2017), Spanish artist
- Carles Solà (born 1945), Spanish chemical engineer
- Carles Soria (born 1996), Spanish footballer
- Carles Torrens (born 1984), Spanish director, screenwriter, editor, and producer
- Carles Trepat (born 1960), Spanish guitarist

== Middle name ==
- Frederick Carles Merry (died 1900), American architect
- Jesús Carles de Vilallonga (1927–2018), Spanish artist
- Josep Carles Laínez (born 1970), Spanish writer
- Ricardo María Carles Gordó (1926–2013), Spanish priest
- Sara Carles Johns (1894–1965), American artist and fashion illustrator

== Surname ==
- Adele Carles (born 1968), Australian politician
- Antonin Carlès (1851–1919), French sculptor
- Arthur Beecher Carles (1882–1952), American Modernist painter
- Jean Carles (1892–1966), French perfumer
- Pierre Carles (born 1962), French documentarist
- Richard Fifer Carles (born 1957), Panamanian businessman and politician

== See also ==
- Carles (disambiguation)
- Carle, surnames
- Carle (given name)
- Carles & Sofia Piano Duo
- Carlen (surname)
- Carley (name)
- Carlos (given name)
- Carlos (surname)
- Charles
