= Carlos (given name) =

Carlos is a masculine given name, and is the Maltese, Portuguese and Spanish cognate of the English and French name Charles, derived from the latin name Carolus, which in turn derived from North Germanic Karl.

== Royalty ==
- Carlos I of Portugal (1863–1908), second to last King of Portugal
- Carlos II of Spain, last Habsburg King in Spain
- Carlos, Prince of Asturias (1545–1568), son of King Philip II
- Carlos III (1716–1788), King of Spain from 10 August 1759 to 14 December 1788
- Carlos IV (1748–1819), King of Spain from 14 December 1788, until his abdication on 19 March 1808
- Infante Carlos, Count of Molina (1788–1855), first of the Carlist claimants to the throne of Spain
- Carlos (Calusa) (died 1567), king of the Calusa people of Florida
- Carlos Hugo, Duke of Parma (1930–2010), Carlist claimant to the throne of Spain
- Prince Carlos, Duke of Parma (born 1970), Carlist claimant to the throne of Spain
- Prince Carlos Hugo Roderik Sybren de Bourbon de Parme (born 1997), son of Prince Carlos, Duke of Parma

== People in media ==
- Carlos Alazraqui (born 1962), American stand-up comedian and actor
- Carlos Bernard (born 1962), American actor
- Carlos Braithwaite, African-American actor who was a cast member on the Canadian sketch comedy TV series You Can't Do That on Television
- Carlos Bustamante, Canadian television personality; former YTV host from 2002 to 2018 and current reporter of Entertainment Tonight Canada since 2017
- Carlos Caridad-Montero (born 1967), Venezuelan film director
- Carlos Castro (journalist) (1945–2011), Portuguese journalist & murder victim
- Carlos Irwin Estévez (Charlie Sheen, born 1965), American actor
- Carlos Gutierrez, U.S. Secretary of Commerce
- Carlos Mencia (born 1967), comedian, host of Mind of Mencia on Comedy Central
- Carlos Ray "Chuck" Norris (1940–2026), American actor and martial artist
- Carlos Pesquera, (born 1956), Puerto Rican civil engineer
- Carlos Saldanha (born 1965), Brazilian director
- Carlos Scholz (born 1994), Spanish actor
- Carlos Watson (journalist) (born 1969), American television host, lawyer, and businessman

== People in music ==
- Carlos Alomar (born 1951), American guitarist, composer and arranger
- Carlos do Carmo (1939–2021), Portuguese fado singer
- Carlos Cavazo (born 1957), guitarist of Quiet Riot
- Carlos Chávez (1899–1978), Mexican composer, conductor, and educator
- Carlos Dengler (born 1974), American actor, bassist, and founding member of the band Interpol
- Carlos Henriquez (musician) (born 1979), Puerto Rican jazz bassist
- Carlos Gardel (1890–1935), prominent figure in the history of tango music
- Carlos Montoya (1903–1993), prominent flamenco guitarist
- Carlos PenaVega (born 1989), American singer, dancer and actor
- Carlos Ponce (born 1972), Puerto Rican actor, singer, composer and television personality
- Carlos Rivera (born 1986), Mexican actor and singer
- Carlos Santana (born 1947), Mexican musician, leader of the band Santana
- Carlos Vives (born 1961), Colombian singer
- Carlos Ward (born 1940), jazz alto saxophonist and flautist

== People in sport ==
- Carlos Alcaraz (born 2003), Spanish tennis player
- Carlos Basham Jr. (born 1997), American football player
- Carlos Brathwaite (born 1988), former Barbados and West Indies cricketer known for being the holder of the accolade of being the man who hit four sixes to take the West Indies home against England in 2016.
- Carlos Davis (born 1996), American football player
- Carlos Del Rio-Wilson (born 2002), American football player
- Carlos Garay (born 1972), American football player
- Carlos Henderson (born 1994), American football player
- Carlos Hendricks (born 1983), American football player
- Carlos Huertas (born 1991) Colombian racing driver
- Carlos Hyde (born 1990) American football player
- Carlos James (American football) (born 1972), American football player
- Carlos Joseph (1980–2021), American football player
- Carlos Menem Jr. (1968–1995), Argentine rally driver
- Carlos Moyá (born 1976), Spanish tennis player
- Carlos Muñoz (racing driver) (born 1992), Colombian racing driver
- Carlos Nieto (born 1976), Italian-Argentine rugby union player
- Carlos Prates (born 1993), Brazilian UFC fighter
- Carlos Sainz (born 1962), Spanish World Rally Championship driver, 1990 and 1992 champion.
- Carlos Sainz Jr. (born 1994), Formula 1 driver for Scuderia Ferrari
- Carlos Washington Jr. (born 1998), American football player
- Carlos Watkins (born 1993), American football player

=== Baseball players ===
- Carlos Almanzar, Dominican baseball player
- Carlos Baerga, Puerto Rican baseball player
- Carlos Beltrán (born 1977), Puerto Rican baseball player
- Carlos Bernier, Puerto Rican baseball player
- Carlos Carrasco (baseball), Venezuelan baseball player
- Carlos Casimiro, Dominican baseball player
- Carlos Castillo (baseball), American baseball player
- Carlos Corporán, Puerto Rican baseball player
- Carlos Correa, Puerto Rican baseball player
- Carlos Cortes (born 1997), American baseball player
- Carlos Crawford, American baseball player
- Carlos Delgado (born 1972), Puerto Rican baseball player
- Carlos Diaz (catcher), American baseball player
- Carlos Diaz (pitcher), American baseball player
- Carlos Estévez (baseball), Dominican baseball player
- Carlos Febles, Dominican baseball player
- Carlos Fisher, American baseball player
- Carlos García (baseball), Venezuelan baseball player
- Carlos Gómez, Dominican baseball player
- Carlos González (baseball), Venezuelan baseball player
- Carlos Guevara, American baseball player
- Carlos Guillén, Venezuelan baseball player
- Carlos Hernández (catcher), Venezuelan baseball player
- Carlos Hernández (infielder), Venezuelan baseball player
- Carlos Hernández (pitcher, born 1980), Venezuelan baseball player
- Carlos Hernández (pitcher, born 1997), Venezuelan baseball player
- Carlos Lee (born 1976), Panamanian baseball player
- Carlos Lezcano, Puerto Rican baseball player
- Carlos López (baseball), Mexican baseball player
- Carlos Maldonado (catcher), Venezuelan baseball player
- Carlos Maldonado (pitcher), Panamanian baseball player
- Carlos Marmol, Dominican baseball player
- Carlos Martínez (infielder), Venezuelan baseball player
- Carlos Martínez (pitcher, born 1982), Dominican baseball player
- Carlos Martínez (pitcher, born 1991), Dominican baseball player
- Carlos May (born 1948), American baseball player
- Carlos Méndez (baseball), Venezuelan baseball player
- Carlos Mendoza (outfielder), Venezuelan baseball player
- Carlos Monasterios, Venezuelan baseball player
- Carlos Moore, American baseball player
- Carlos Muñiz, American baseball player
- Carlos Pascual (baseball), Cuban baseball player
- Carlos Paula, Cuban baseball player
- Carlos Peguero, Dominican baseball player
- Carlos Peña, Dominican baseball player
- Carlos Pérez (baseball), Dominican baseball player
- Carlos Pérez (catcher, born 1996), Venezuelan baseball player
- Carlos Ponce (baseball), Puerto Rican baseball player
- Carlos Pulido, Venezuelan baseball player
- Carlos Quentin, American baseball player
- Carlos Quintana (baseball), Venezuelan baseball player
- Carlos Reyes (baseball), American baseball player
- Carlos Rivera (baseball), Puerto Rican baseball player
- Carlos Rodón, American baseball player
- Carlos Rodríguez (infielder), Mexican baseball player
- Carlos Rosa, Dominican baseball player
- Carlos Ruiz (baseball) (born 1979), Panamanian baseball player
- Carlos Santana (baseball), Dominican baseball player
- Carlos Silva (baseball), Venezuelan baseball player
- Carlos Torres (pitcher), American baseball player
- Carlos Triunfel, Dominican baseball player
- Carlos Valderrama (baseball) (born 1977), Venezuelan baseball player
- Carlos Valdez (baseball), Dominican baseball player
- Carlos Velázquez (baseball), Puerto Rican baseball player
- Carlos Villanueva (baseball), Dominican baseball player
- Carlos Zambrano (born 1981), American baseball player

=== Basketball players ===
- Carlos Almeida (born 1976), Angolan basketball player
- Carlos Arroyo (born 1979), Puerto Rican basketball player
- Carlos Delfino, (born 1982), Argentine NBA basketball player
- Carlos Boozer, (born 1981), American NBA basketball player

=== Cyclists ===
- Carlos Jaramillo (born 1961), Colombian road cyclist
- Carlos Alberto Contreras (born 1973), Colombian road cyclist
- Carlos Humberto Cabrera (born 1973), Colombian road cyclist
- Carlos Silva (cyclist) (born 1974), Colombian cyclist
- Carlos Sastre (born 1975), Spanish cyclist
- Carlos Alzate (born 1983), Colombian track and road cyclist

=== Fighters ===
- Carlos Augusto Filho (born 1986), Brazilian mixed martial artist and kickboxer
- Carlos Valcárcel (born 1981), Puerto Rican boxer
- Carlos Varela (wrestler) (born 1966), Cuban wrestler
- Carlos Julian Ortíz (born 1974), Cuban freestyle wrestler
- Carlos Motta (judoka) (1955–2018), Brazilian judoka
- Carlos Fonseca (boxer) (born 1955), Brazilian boxer
- Carlos Luis Campos (born 1980), Venezuelan boxer
- Carly Colón (born 1979), professional wrestler, WWE
- Carlos Condit (born 1984), American mixed martial artist
- Carlos Honorato (born 1974), Brazilian judoka

=== Footballers ===
- Carlos Abad (born 1995), Spanish footballer
- Carlos Baleba (born 2004), Cameroonian footballer
- Carlos Bocanegra (born 1979), American soccer player
- Carlos Alberto Carvalho da Silva Júnior (born 1995), Brazilian football forward
- Carlos Chaínho (born 1974), Portuguese footballer
- Carlos Diogo (born 1983), Uruguayan footballer
- Carlos Edwards (born 1978), Trinidadian footballer
- Carlos Fernandes (footballer, born 1978), Portuguese football defender
- Carlos Fernandes (footballer, born 1979), Portuguese football goalkeeper
- Carlos Fernández (footballer, born 1984), Peruvian footballer
- Carlos Fernández (footballer, born 1996), Spanish footballer
- Carlos Gruezo (footballer, born 1975), Ecuadorian footballer
- Carlos Gruezo (footballer, born 1995), Ecuadorian footballer
- Carlos Guirland (born 1968), Paraguayan football midfielder
- Carlos Isaac (footballer) (born 1988), Spanish footballer
- Carlos Martins (footballer) (born 1982), Portuguese footballer
- Carlos Muñoz Cobo (born 1961), Spanish footballer, known as "Carlos"
- Carlos Muñoz (Chilean footballer) (born 1989), Chilean footballer
- Carlos Muñoz (Ecuadorian footballer) (1967–1993), Ecuadorian footballer
- Carlos Muñoz (Mexican footballer) (born 1959), Mexican footballer
- Carlos Ochoa (born 1978), Mexican footballer
- Carlos Queiroz (born 1953), Portuguese football manager
- Carlos Santos de Jesus (born 1985), Brazilian football defender
- Carlos Pérez Salvachúa (born 1973), Spanish football manager
- Carlos Soca (born 1969), Uruguayan footballer
- Carlos Tevez (born 1984), Argentine footballer
- Carlos Valderrama (born 1961), Colombian football player known as El Pibe

=== Gymnasts ===
- Carlos del Ser (born 2003), Spanish trampolinist
- Carlos Yulo (born 2000), Filipino artistic gymnast

=== Runners ===
- Carlos Moreno (athlete) (born 1967), Chilean track and field sprinter
- Carlos Patrício (born 1964), Portuguese long-distance runner
- Carlos Retiz (born 1968), Mexican long-distance runner
- Carlos Tarazona (born 1966), Venezuelan long-distance runner

=== Swimmers ===
- Carlos Berrocal (born 1957), Puerto Rican swimmer
- Carlos Ventosa (born 1971), Spanish backstroke swimmer

=== Volleyball players ===
- Carlos Weber (born 1966), Argentine volleyball player
- Carlos Carreño (born 1973), Spanish volleyball player
- Carlos Teixeira (born 1976), Portuguese volleyball player
- Carlos Tejeda (born 1980), Venezuelan volleyball player

== Other people ==
- Carlos Acosta (born 1973), Cuban ballet dancer
- Carlos Agassi (born 1979), Filipino actor, rap artist, host, and model
- Carlos Agostinho do Rosário (born 1954), Prime Minister of Mozambique
- Carlos Arango Vélez (1897–1974), Colombian politician
- Carlos Julio Villar Aleman (born 1946), Cuban artist
- Carlos Anwandter (1801–1889), German political exile who immigrated to Chile
- Carlos Arroyo (architect), Spanish architect
- Carlos Arruza (1920–1966), Mexican bullfighter
- Carlos Bunga (born 1976), Portuguese artist
- Carlos Camacho (1924–1979), first elected governor of Guam
- Carlos de Campos (1866–1927), Brazilian politician
- Carlos Cardoen (born 1942), Chilean metallurgical engineer
- Carlos Castaneda (1925–1998), American author
- Carlos Cheppi (born 1955), Argentine diplomat
- Carlos Cisneros (1948–2019), New Mexico state senator
- Carlos Cisneros (1962–present), member of the Argentine Chamber of Deputies
- Carlos Coolidge (1792–1866), governor of the State of Vermont
- Carlos Danger, 2013, alias used by New York City Mayoral candidate Anthony Weiner for sexting
- Carlos Dominguez III (born 1945), Filipino businessman
- Carlos Escudé (1948–2021), Argentine academic and writer
- Carlos Fuentes (1928–2012), Mexican writer
- Carlos Garaikoetxea (1938–2026), Basque politician from Spain
- Carlos P. Garcia (1896–1971), eighth Filipino president and poet
- Carlos Ghosn (born 1954), former chairman and CEO of the Renault-Nissan-Mitsubishi Alliance
- Carlos Gutierrez (born 1953), Cuban American, 35th U.S. Secretary of Commerce and former Chairman of the Board and CEO of the Kellogg Company
- Carlos Hathcock (1942–1999), US Marine Corps sniper
- Carlos Howard, Governor of West Florida between 1792 and 93
- Carlos Marcello, American mobster
- Carlos Marighella (1911–1969), Brazilian leading thinker on urban guerrilla warfare
- Carlos Menchaca (born 1980), American politician, New York City Mayoral candidate
- Carlos Gustavo Moreira (born 1973), Brazilian mathematician
- Carlos Muniz (politician) (born 2001), Brazilian politician
- Carlos Pérez de Bricio (1927–2022), Spanish businessman and politician
- Carlos P. Romulo (1898–1985), Filipino politician who was formerly a president of the UN General Assembly
- Carlos Salinas de Gortari (born 1948), President of Mexico from 1988 to 1994
- Carlos Simpson (born 1962), American mathematician
- Carlos Slim (born 1940; full name Carlos Slim Helú), Mexican businessman
- Carlos Slim Domit (born 1967), Mexican businessman and son of Carlos Slim Helú
- Carlos Solchaga (born 1944), Spanish politician and businessman
- Carlos the Jackal, the nom de guerre of Ilich Ramírez Sánchez (born 1949), a Venezuelan assassin and terrorist serving a life sentence for murder in France
- Carlos Urbizo, Honduran politician and economist
- Carlos Uriarte (born 1979), American lawyer
- Carlos Isagani Zarate (born 1967), Filipino politician

=== Multiple people ===
- Carlos Imperial (disambiguation)

== Fictional characters ==
- Carlos De Vil, son of Cruella in Descendants
- Carlos Miyamoto, one of the player characters in the SNES game, Final Fight 2
- Carlos Nieto, a paramedic in the television series Third Watch
- Carlos Oliveira (Resident Evil), one of the two protagonists in Resident Evil 3: Nemesis
- Carlos Ramon, a fictional character and is one of Ms. Frizzle's classmates, in the Scholastic book and television series The Magic School Bus
- Carlos Solis, a character from Desperate Housewives
- Carlos Vallerte, the character in two of the Power Rangers series
- Don Carlos, the main character of Schiller's eponymous play and the Verdi opera inspired by it, based on a fictional retelling of the Spanish infante's life.

== See also ==
- Carlos (disambiguation)
- Carlos (surname)
- Carles (name)
- Carlo (name)
- Carlitos
- Carlon
- Carlos Alberto
- José Carlos (disambiguation)
- Carlos Antonio (disambiguation)
- Karlos (name)
