= Carles =

Carles (Eastern Catalan: [ˈkaɾləs]) is a common Catalan given name of Germanic origin, which also appears as a surname. The English language equivalent is Charles.

The name Carles can refer to:

== People ==
- Carles (name)

== Places ==
- Carles, Iloilo, a 2nd class municipality in the province of Iloilo, Philippines, named after the Spanish Governor of Iloilo.

== See also ==
- Alfara de Carles
- Sant Carles (disambiguation)
- Calès (disambiguation)
- Cares (disambiguation)
- Carle (disambiguation)
- Carlee
- Carless (disambiguation)
- Carley (disambiguation)
- Carlos (disambiguation)
- Caples (disambiguation)
- Cartes (disambiguation)
- Charles (disambiguation)
