= Carlos Cisneros =

Carlos Cisneros may refer to:

- Carlos Cisneros (basketball) (born 1933), Argentine basketball player
- Carlos Cisneros (American politician) (1948–2019), American politician
- Carlos Cisneros (footballer) (born 1993), Mexican footballer
- Carlos Cisneros (Argentine politician) (born 1962), Argentine politician
