= Carlos =

Carlos may refer to:

== Places ==
Canada

- Carlos, Alberta, a locality

United States

- Carlos, Indiana, an unincorporated community
- Carlos, Maryland, a place in Allegany County
- Carlos, Minnesota, a small city
- Carlos, West Virginia

Elsewhere

- Carlos (crater), Montes Apenninus, LQ12, Moon; a lunar crater near Mons Hadley

== People ==
- Carlos (given name), including a list of name holders
- Carlos (surname), including a list of name holders

=== Sportspeople ===
- Carlos (Timorese footballer) (Carlos Mateus Ximenes, born 1986)
- Carlos (footballer, born 1995) (Carlos Alberto Carvalho da Silva Júnior), Brazilian footballer
- Carlos (footballer, born 1985) (Carlos Santos de Jesus), Brazilian footballer

=== Others ===
- Carlos (Calusa) (died 1567), king or paramount chief of the Calusa people of Southwest Florida
- Carlos (singer) (1943–2008), French entertainer
- Carlos the Jackal, a Venezuelan terrorist

== Arts and entertainment ==
- Carlos (miniseries), 2010 biopic about the terrorist Carlos the Jackal
- Carlos (1971 film), a film based on Don Carlos
- Carlos (2023 film), a documentary film about American guitarist Carlos Santana
- Carlos, 2000 album by Carlos Toshiki

== Other uses ==
- Carlos (cycling team), Belgian pro cycling team

== See also ==
- Karlos (name)
- Carlo (disambiguation)
- Don Carlos (disambiguation)
