= Careless =

Careless may refer to:

- Carelessness, a lack of awareness that can result in unintentional consequences

== Music ==
- Careless (record label), a Philippine label
- Careless (album), by Stephen Bishop, 1976
- Careless, an album by Micky & the Motorcars, 2007
- Careless, an album by Richard Shindell, 2016
- "Careless" (song), by Paul Kelly and the Messengers, 1989
- "Careless", a song by Amos Lee from Supply and Demand, 2006
- "Careless", a song by Barenaked Ladies from Buck Naked, 1989
- "Careless", a song by Carly Pearce from Every Little Thing, 2017
- "Careless", a song by Cinerama from Torino, 2002
- "Careless", a song by Deadmau5 from Get Scraped, 2005
- "Careless", a song by Royal Blood from Royal Blood, 2014
- "Careless (Akasha's Lament)", a song by Jonathan Davis from Alone I Play, 2007

== Other uses ==
- Careless (surname), including a list of people with the name
- Careless (film), a 1962 Italian film directed by Mauro Bolognini
- Careless, a 2007 film directed by Peter Spears
- Careless (novel), a 2006 novel by Deborah Robertson
- Tupolev Tu-154, NATO reporting name "Careless", a Soviet/Russian jet airliner
- Careless (TV series), an upcoming Australian and British television drama series
