= Carlos (surname) =

Carlos is a Spanish and Portuguese surname. Notable people with the surname include:

- Bettina Carlos (born 1987), Filipino actress and host
- Bun E. Carlos (born 1950; birth name Brad Carlson), American musician; drummer for Cheap Trick
- Cisco Carlos (born 1940), American baseball player
- Dionardo Carlos (born 1966), Filipino police officer
- John Carlos (born 1945), American track and field athlete
- Keith Carlos (born 1987), American model and former football player
- Manoel Carlos (1933–2026), Brazilian screenwriter
- Roberto Carlos (disambiguation), several people
- Wendy Carlos (born 1939), American composer and musician
- William Careless (Carlos) (c. 1610–1689), English Royalist officer during the English Civil War

== See also ==
- Carlos (disambiguation)
- Carlos (given name)
- Carles (name)
- Carlo (name)
- Carlon
