= Caelo =

Caelo may refer to:

- A misspelling of Carlo
- On the Heavens (De Caelo in Latin), a treatise in cosmology by the ancient Greek philosopher Aristotle
- "servare de caelo", a phrase in the Glossary of ancient Roman religion
