= Congost =

Congost may refer to

- Congost (river) in Spain
- Congost (surname)
- Pavelló Nou Congost, indoor sports arena in Spain
