= Carless =

Carless is a surname. Notable people with the surname include:

- Betty Careless (c. 1704 – 1739), probably born Elizabeth Carless, notorious courtesan and bagnio owner in London
- Ernie Carless (1912–1987), Welsh cricketer
- Hugh Carless (1925–2011), British explorer and diplomat
- John Henry Carless (1896–1917), English Royal Navy sailor, posthumous First World War recipient of the Victoria Cross
- Roy Carless (1920–2009), Canadian cartoonist

== See also ==
- Petrochem Carless Ltd, originally Carless, a UK oil company
- Careless (surname)
- Car-free city
- Kahless, a fictional character in the Star Trek universe
