= Roberto Carlos (disambiguation) =

Roberto Carlos (born 1973) is a Brazilian former footballer and manager.

Roberto Carlos may also refer to:

- Roberto Carlos (singer) (born 1941), Brazilian singer
- Roberto Carlos (footballer, born 1971), Brazilian footballer
- Roberto Carlos (footballer, born 1982), Spanish footballer
- Roberto Abbondanzieri (Roberto Carlos Abbondanzieri, born 1972), Argentine footballer
- Roberto Castro (footballer) (Roberto Carlos Castro, (born 1980), Mexican footballer
- Roberto Chacón (Roberto Carlos Chacón, born 1999), Venezuelan footballer
- Roberto Carlos Cortés (born 1977), Colombian footballer
- Roberto Fernández (Bolivian footballer) (Roberto Carlos Fernández, born 1999), Bolivian footballer
- Roberto Carlos Juárez (born 1984), Mexican footballer
- Roberto Carlos Leyva (born 1979), Mexican boxer
- Roberto Carlos Peña (born 1984), Colombian footballer
- Roberto Sosa (Argentine footballer) (Roberto Carlos Sosa, born 1975), Argentine footballer
- Helado Negro (born 1980), American singer, full name Roberto Carlos Lange

== See also ==
- Carlos Roberto (born 1948), Brazilian footballer and manager
