= Careless (surname) =

Careless is a surname. Notable people with this surname include:

- Betty Careless (c. 1704–1739), English prostitute and bagnio owner
- George Careless (1839–1932), Latter-day Saint composer and conductor
- J. M. S. Careless (1919–2009), Canadian historian from the University of Toronto
- William Careless, later known as William Carlos (c. 1610–1689), companion of King Charles II in his hiding in an oak tree in the English Civil War

== See also ==
- Carless, another surname
