= Congost (surname) =

Congost (Eastern Catalan: [kuŋˈɡost]) is a Spanish surname of Catalan origin. Notable people with the surname include:

- Carles Congost (born 1970), Spanish visual artist
- Elena Congost Mohedano (born 1987), Spanish visually impaired runner
