= Rodger Mack =

American sculptor (1938–2002)

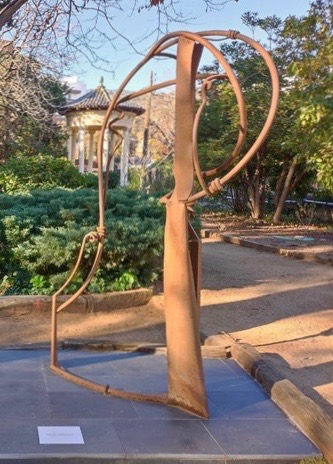
- Midnight Music, 1990, located on the grounds of the U.S. Consulate General, Barcelona, Spain
- Born: November 8, 1938; Barberton, Ohio
- Died: September 16, 2002 (aged 63); Syracuse, New York
- Education: Cleveland Institute of Art, Cranbrook Academy of Art

Rodger Mack (1938, Barberton, Ohio – 2002, Syracuse, New York) was an American sculptor, painter, ceramic artist and educator. He is best known for his large-scale bronze and steel sculptures. His works are featured in national and international museums and gallery collections including MACBA - Barcelona Museum of Contemporary Art, Arkansas Art Center, Stone Quarry Hill Art Park, the Oscar Krasner Gallery, and the Grand Valley State University collection.

Mack was a faculty member for more than thirty years at Syracuse University’s College of Visual and Performing Arts. He served as the school’s first director from 1982-91. As an alumnus of the Triangle Arts Association, Mack worked with notable artists such as Anthony Caro, Jaume Plensa, and Helen Frankenthaler. The Spanish/Canadian artist Jesús Carles de Vilallonga travelled to Syracuse to study with Mack and produced several sculptures in bronze and aluminum under his tutelage.

Mack's work and process has been featured in books such as Launching the Imagination: A Comprehensive Guide to Basic Design by Mary Stewart and American Ceramics: The Collection of Everson Museum of Art edited by Barbara Perry and published by Rizzoli International Publications.

A documentary film entitled "A Resonant Chord — Rodger Mack and the Creative Process" features his art and philosophy. It was produced by the Syracuse Alternative Media Network and features original music by Marc Mellits and Edward Ruchalski. The film was commissioned by the Society for New Music in 2014.

== Life and career ==
Rodger Mack was born on November 8, 1938, in Barberton, Ohio. He enrolled at the Cleveland Institute of Art as an industrial design student, and he was intent on using what he learned in college to advance in a career of car design. Yet after a summer job at General Motors, where Mack realized that sculptors did not actually get to design the cars, just make three-dimensional models based on designs produced by someone else, he decided that perhaps car design was not for him. Mack received his Bachelor of Fine Arts degree from the Cleveland Institute of Arts in 1961, and his Master of Fine Arts degree with a concentration in sculpture from the Cranbrook Academy of Art in Michigan in 1963. After graduating with his master's degree, Mack received a Fulbright Scholarship. This allowed him to travel to Florence between 1963 and 1964 to further his art education. While in Florence, Mack learned multiple casting techniques and created sixteen cast-bronze sculptures at the Bruno Bearzi Foundry.

Shortly after Mack's return from Florence, the governor of Arkansas asked him to help found the Arkansas Art Center, which offered a BFA degree program. Mack taught drawing, three-dimensional design, and ceramics, and also constructed a foundry with the help of students. After four years, however, the BFA program was terminated, and he elected to move on to other endeavors.

In 1968 Syracuse University hired Mack as a sculpture professor. He received tenure in 1971, just a few short years after he began teaching, and between 1982 and 1991 Mack served as the director of the university's School of Art and Design in the College of Visual and Performing Arts. During this time Mack played an integral role in the creation of the Comstock Art Facility, which provided studio space for all sculpture students to work under a single roof, along with art students working in other media. He also helped to enhance the sculpture program's enrollment size and reputation. Many viewed Mack as one of the most important bronze sculptors in the country, and it was his presence at Syracuse University that drew many students to the program. After stepping down from his position as the director of the School of Art, Mack returned to teaching full-time. Syracuse University officially recognized his excellence as a professor multiple times. In 1991 Mack received the Chancellor's Citation for Exceptional Academic Achievement, and in 1999 he received an Outstanding Faculty Award from the College of Visual and Performing Arts.

Mack became famous for his large-scale bronze and steel sculptures, described by one newspaper reporter as “graceful, winding, and abstract.” The artist drew inspiration for his sculptures from his every day experiences, finding creative expression in anything from the shape of a shadow on the surface of an object to musical compositions. Throughout his lifetime Mack exhibited his work nationally and internationally, and his sculptures were bought by many museums, including the Everson Museum of Art in Syracuse and the Munson-Williams-Proctor Arts Institute in Utica, New York. He had a large number of solo exhibitions in New York City, many held at the Krasner Gallery.

== Publications ==
- Mack, Rodger, "The Italian Influence : Landscapes and Sculptures", Stone Quarry Hill Art Park, Cazenovia, NY, 2001.
- Art Triangle Barcelona 1987, Ajuntament de Barcelona, Barcelona, 1987 ISBN 84-7609-210-5
- Schmuckler, Carol North. Painting a Brighter Picture, Syracuse University Magazine, Vol. 2, Iss. 3 [1986], Art. 10
- Mack, Rodger and Archambault, Paul (1980) "Bronze in Negative Space," Syracuse Scholar (1979-1991): Vol. 1 : Iss. 2, Article 9. Available at: Bronze in Negative Space

== Gallery ==
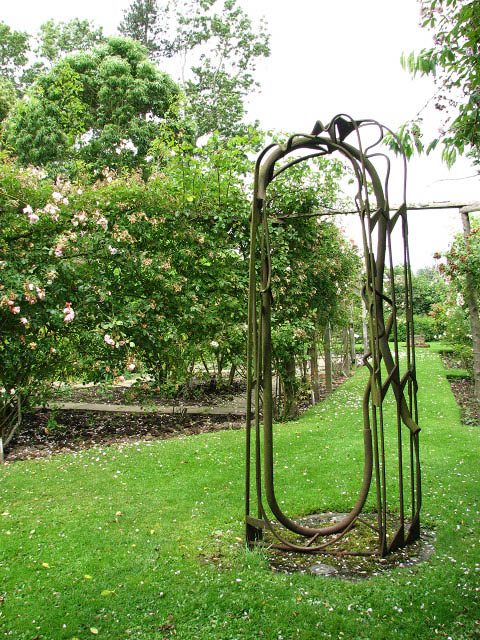
Sculpture in Heritage Rose Garden, Hardingham Workshop, England 1986

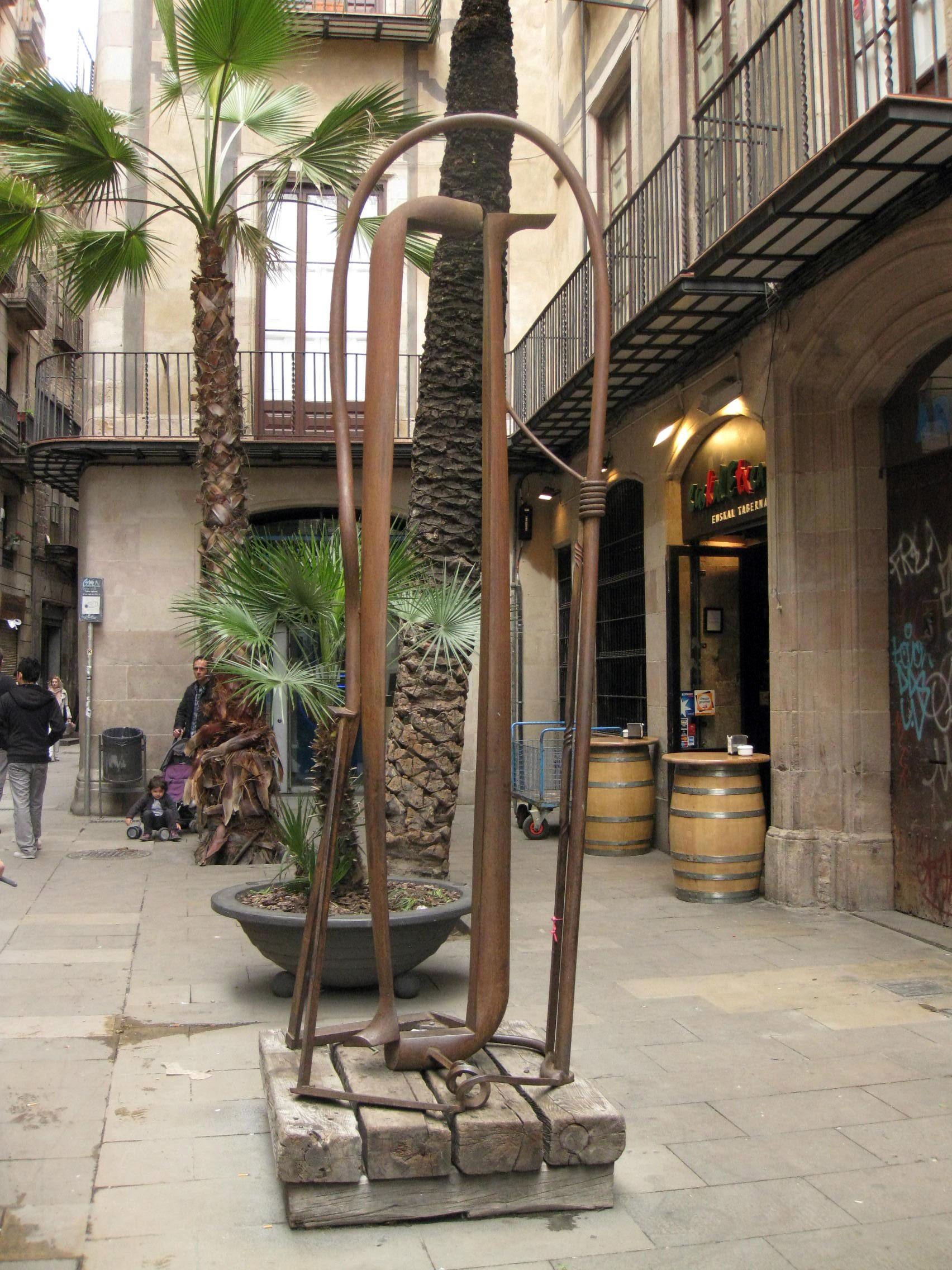
Rodger Mack sculpture near the Picasso Museum in Barcelona
