= Link-boy =

Torch-carrier who lights the way

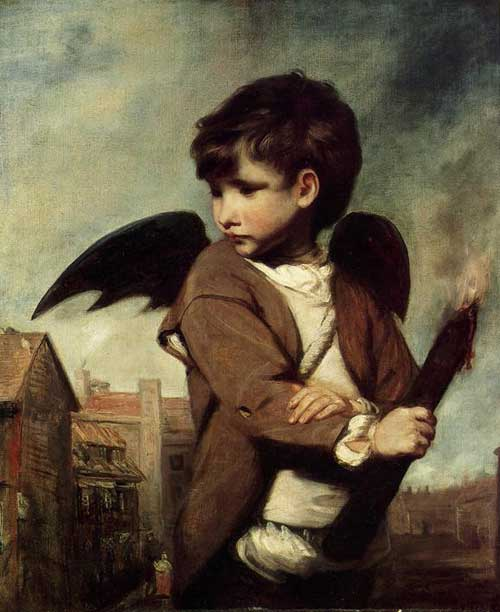
Cupid as a Link Boy, Sir Joshua Reynolds, c. 1771.

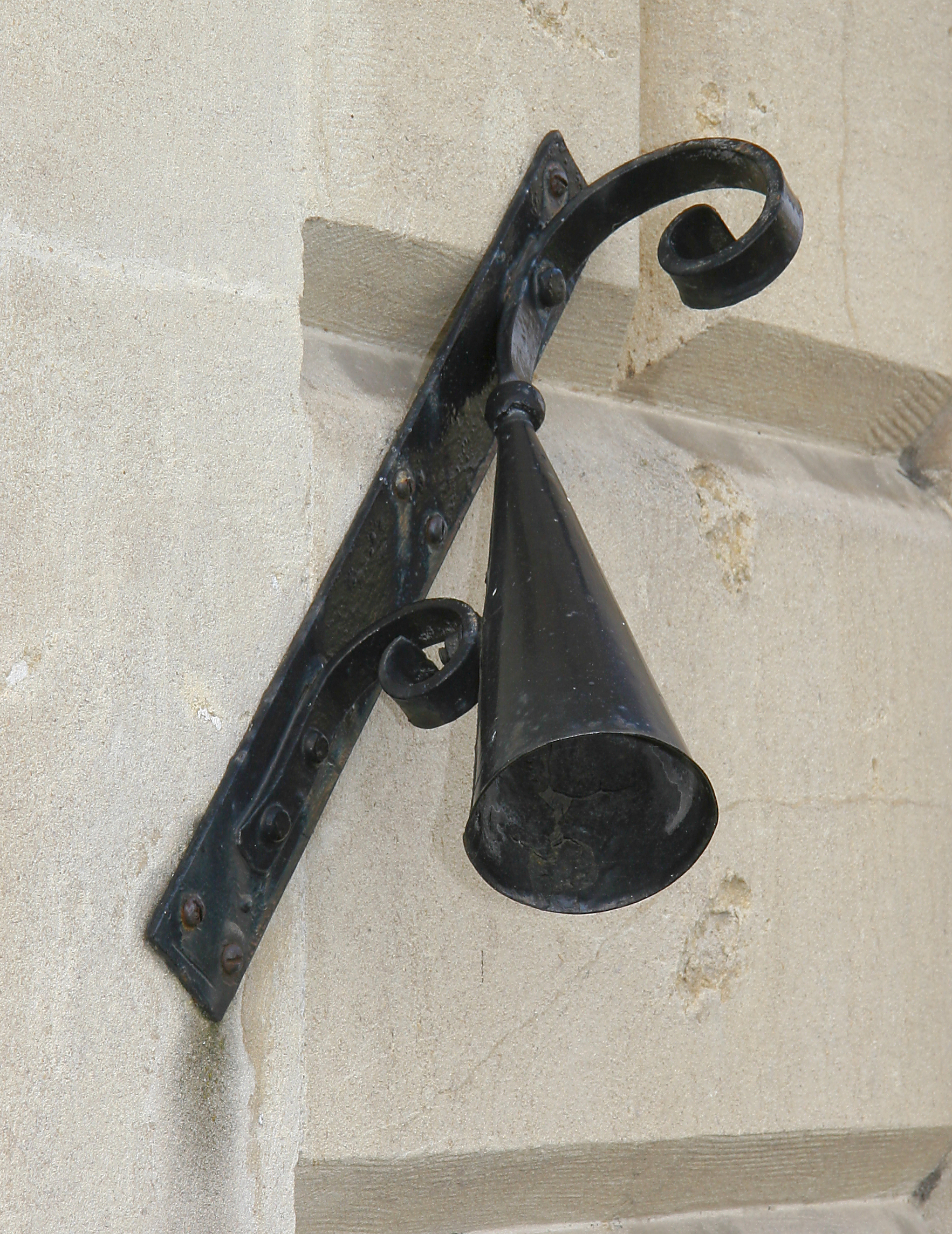
Georgian link extinguisher on a house in Bath, UK

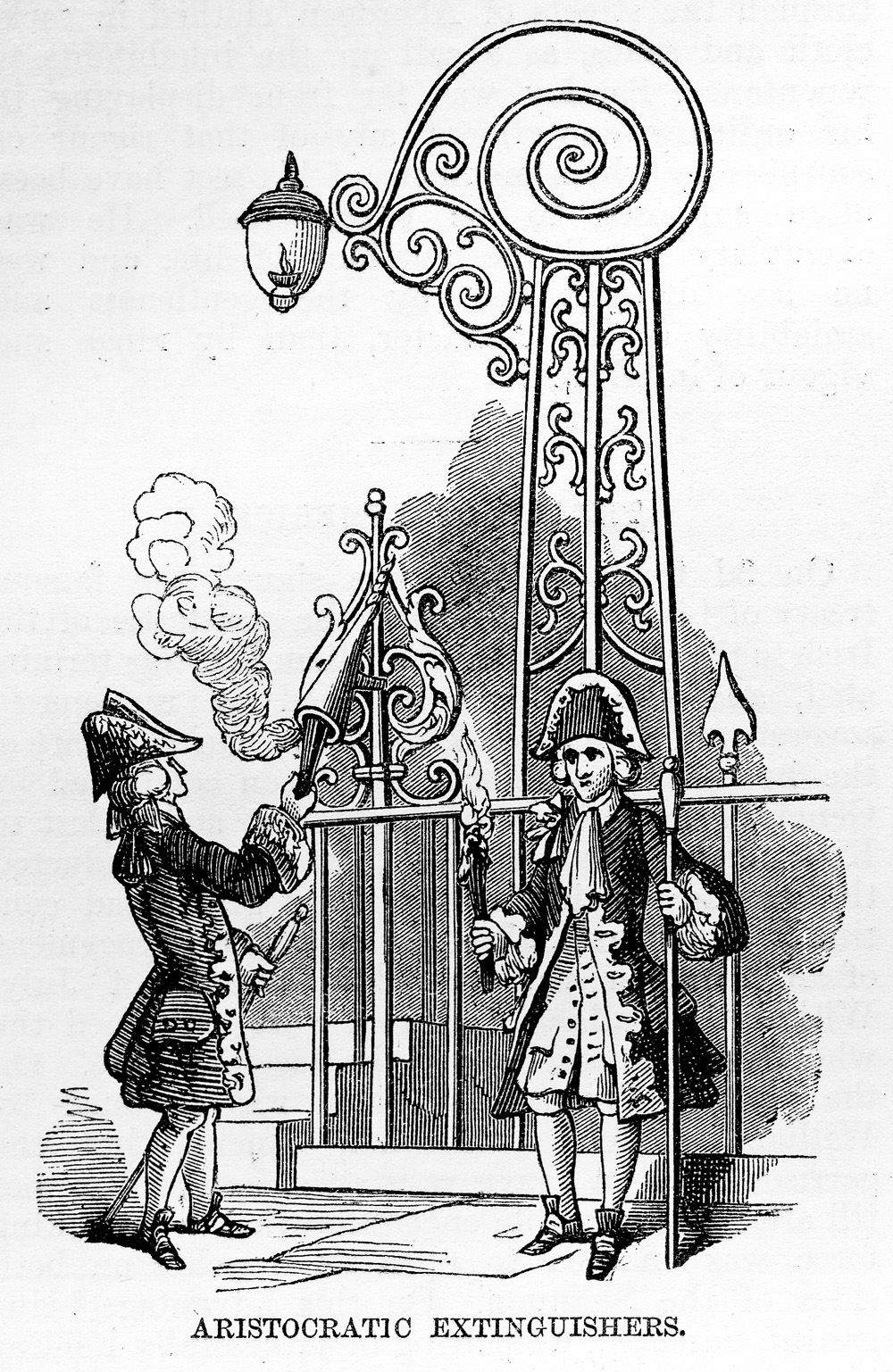
Link boy extinguishing his torch in a link extinguisher at a doorway in Grosvenor Square, London

A link-boy (or link boy or linkboy) was a boy who carried a flaming torch to light the way for pedestrians at night. Linkboys were common in London in the days before the introduction of gas lighting in the early to mid 19th century. The linkboy's fee was commonly one farthing, and the torch was often made from burning pitch and tow.

Link-boys and their torches also accompanied litter vehicles, known as sedan chairs, that were operated by chairmen. Where possible, the link boys escorted the fares to the chairmen, the passengers then being delivered to the door of their lodgings.

Several houses in Bath, UK, and many in London still have the link extinguishers on the exteriors, shaped like outsized candle snuffers (see image, right).

The term derives from "link", a term for the cotton tow that formed the wick of the torch. Links are mentioned in William Shakespeare's Henry IV, part 1, as Falstaff teases Bardolph about the shining redness of his face:

"Thou hast saved me a thousand marks in links and torches, walking with thee in the night betwixt tavern and tavern." (Act III, scene 3)

In the mid-eighteenth century Laurence Casey, who was known as Little Cazey, became the personal linkboy of the famous courtesan Betty Careless, and gained something of reputation as a troublemaker. He features in Louis Peter Boitard's 1739 picture The Covent Garden Morning Frolick, leading the sedan chair containing Betty and being ridden by Captain "Mad Jack" Montague (seafaring brother of the Earl of Sandwich). Henry Fielding considered Montague, his companion Captain Laroun, and Casey "the three most troublesome and difficult to manage of all my Bow Street visitors". Casey was eventually transported to America in 1750.

In thieves' cant, a linkboy was known as a "Glym Jack" ("glym" meant "light") or a "moon-curser" (as their services would not be required on a moonlit night). Employing a linkboy could be dangerous, as some would lead their clients to dark alleyways, where they could be beset by footpads.

== In popular culture ==
Sir Joshua Reynolds painted Cupid as a Link Boy, now held by the Buffalo AKG Art Museum in Buffalo, New York. In that painting, little Cupid as a London linkboy wears demonic bat wings and an immense phallic torch to "remind those in the know of the proclivities of a certain patron." Another appears in the first plate of William Hogarth's The Four Stages of Cruelty, putting out the eyes of a bird using a hot needle heated in the flame of his torch. Hogarth depicts a linkboy again, in plate four, Night, of his Four Times of the Day, this time huddled beneath a bench blowing on his torch.

Linkboys make brief appearances in the novels of William Thackeray and Charles Dickens, and are mentioned by Samuel Pepys in his diary. An anonymous illustrated serial novel, The Link Boy of Old London, was published in the penny dreadful Boys Standard from 4 November 1882.
