= Stone Quarry Hill Art Park =

Sculpture park in New York, United States

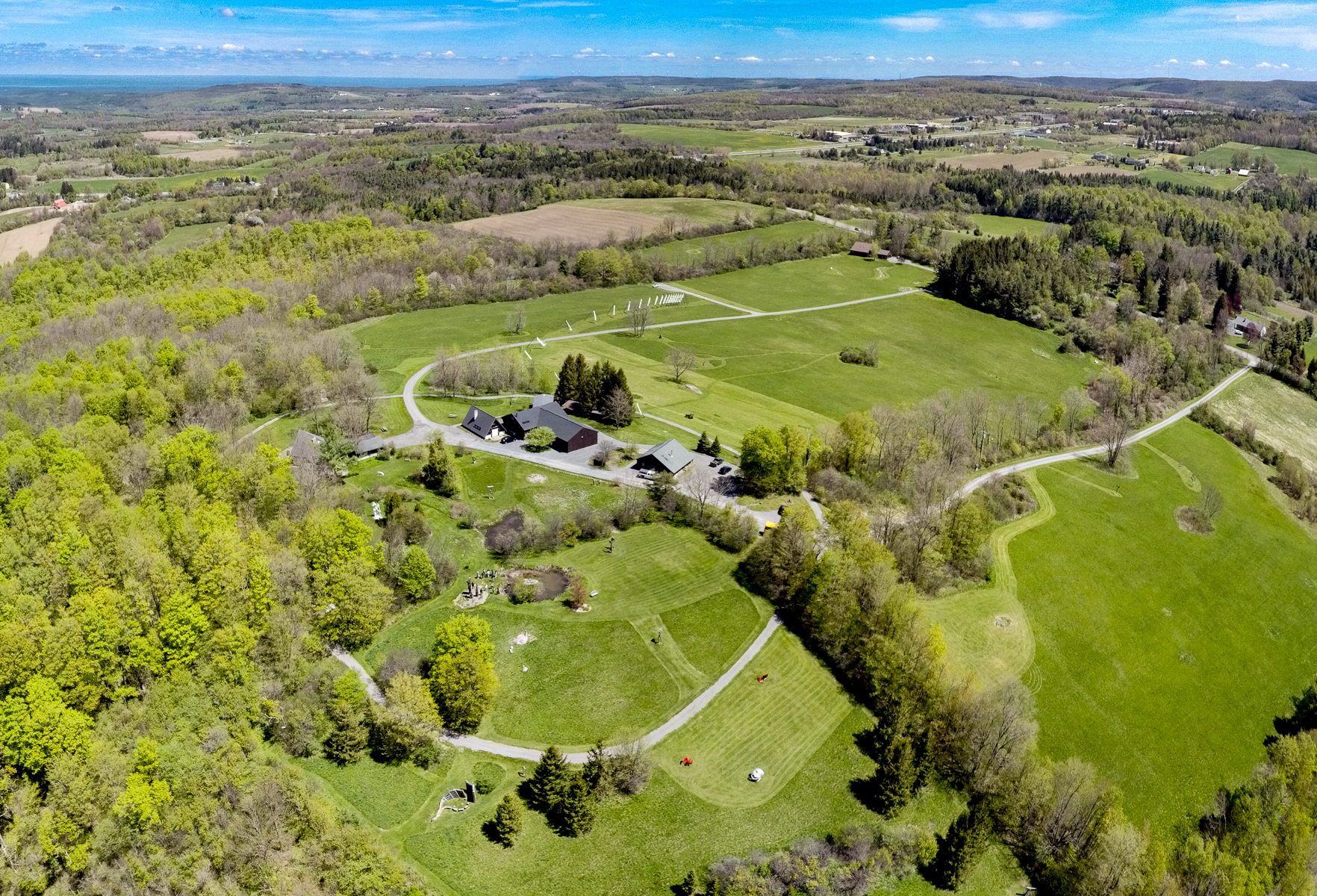
- Interactive map of Stone Quarry Hill Art Park
- Type: Sculpture park
- Location: 3883 Stone Quarry Rd, Cazenovia, NY 13035
- Coordinates: 42.9118145°N 75.8344595°W
- Website: https://sqhap.org/
- Dorothy Riester House and Studio
- U.S. National Register of Historic Places
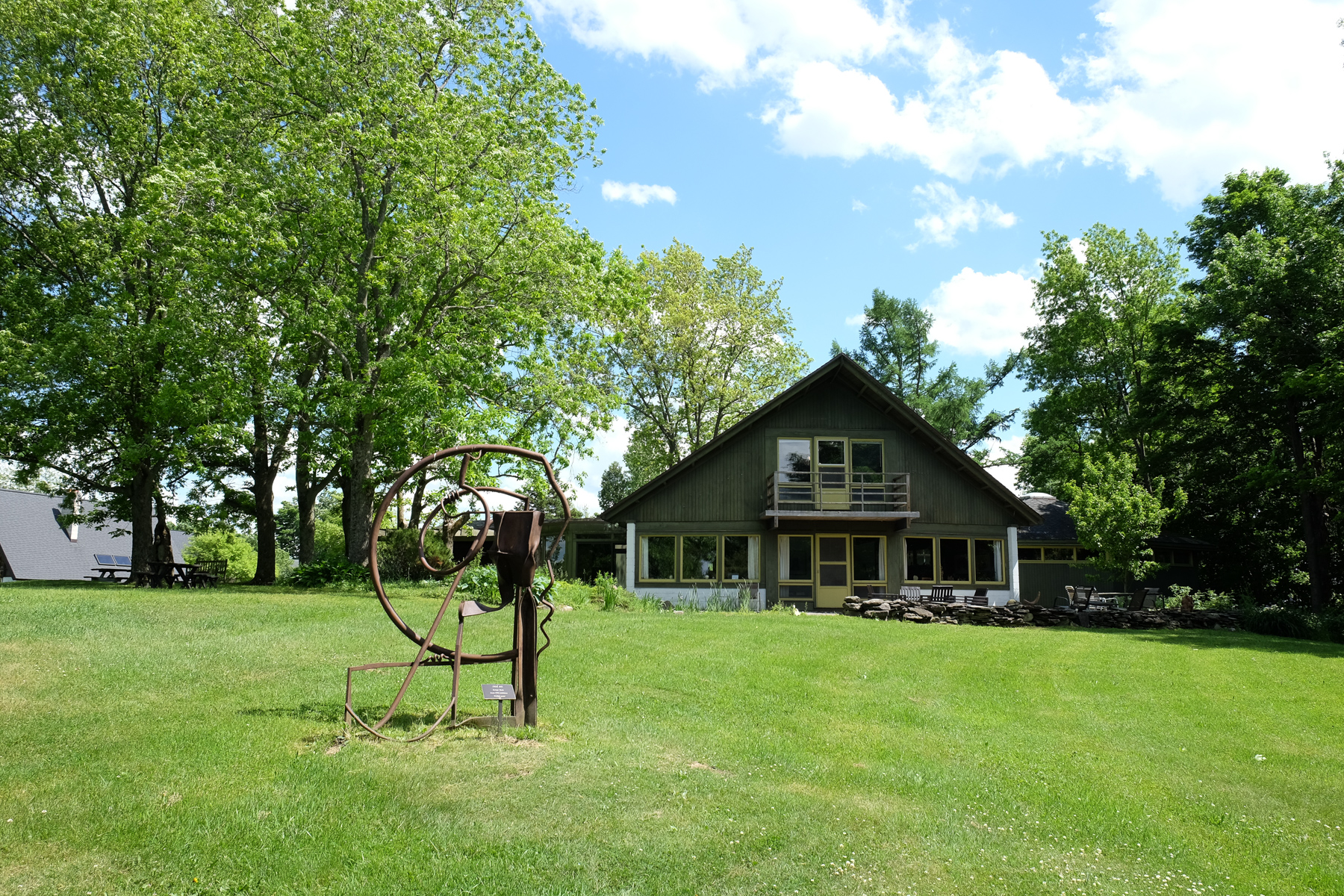
- Riester's house in 2017
- Built: 1959-1960
- Architectural style: Mid-century
- NRHP reference No.: 14000066
- Added to NRHP: March 19, 2014

Stone Quarry Hill Art Park is an outdoor sculpture park located near Cazenovia, New York. It is open every day from dawn to dusk. The Art Park provides outdoor artwork amidst 104 acres of conserved land, along four miles of trails, with views of the rural landscape of Cazenovia and Madison County in Central New York.

In addition to its art and nature programming, the Art Park runs an Artist in Residence Program. Since its incorporation in 1991, over 100 artists from 19 states and 8 foreign countries have created artwork that responds to the landscape of Stone Quarry Hill Art Park.

== History ==
Cazenovia was established in 1793 by John Linklaen. In 180, the property at 3883 Stone Quarry Road was settled as an early 19th century farm by a widow, Mary Hackley, and her two teenage sons. The foundations, hedgerows and a few apple trees make up what is currently referred to as the "Homestead Site," the oldest remains on the property. In the 1840s the quarry along Stone Quarry Road, opened and operated on a small scale until the late 1800s. Remnants from the quarry are still visible from Stone Quarry Road as one approaches the entrance to the Art Park. After many changes in ownership and changes in land boundaries, Dorothy and Robert (Bob) Riester, made their first land purchase in 1958, which included the 23 acres of Mary Hackley’s Farm.

From 1959–1965 the Riesters worked on building a house on the hilltop. Dorothy designed the house, shaped like a cone on its side, in keeping with the contours of the hill and considering the wind direction and bedrock of the land. The Dorothy Riester House and Studio (affectionately referred to as the Hilltop House) is a work of art in itself, much of it hand built by the couple. It is complete with an ivy-covered entryway fashioned after a Japanese Genkan, six-walled library and music room, a greenhouse plant room, handmade tiles for the kitchen and bath, sand-cast walls and fireplace, concrete work and painting. An A-frame art studio was also built to accommodate Dorothy's artistic practice. In 1965, the Hilltop House became a permanent home for the couple. By 1970, the site began its path as a place of artistic activity with the addition of the Art Barn studio, which became a base for the Syracuse Ceramic Guild. The studio was equipped with electric, salt and raku kilns. In 1979, the Syracuse Ceramic Guild initiated the annual Pottery Fair that the Art Park continues to host on its land. As the years went on, the Art Park continued to grow, it was incorporated as a non-profit in 1991. Shortly after the incorporation, Dorothy and Bob Riester hosted the first outdoor exhibition, “Sculpture on the Hilltop.” Today, the Art Park offers indoor and outdoor exhibitions, artist residencies, artist-led workshops, special events, and educational tours.

== The Dorothy Riester House and Studio ==
The Dorothy Riester House and Studio, the former home of Art Park founders Dorothy and Robert Riester remains at the hilltop locus of the Art Park. On March 19, 2014, the house was listed on the National Register of Historic Places. The home and studio space is listed under Criterion C as a highly intact example of a mid-twentieth century modern house and artist studio. The home was designed and built by the Riesters, with help from local contractors Dan McCabe, Gordon Bowers, and Sam Flatt. The home reflects Dorothy’s artistic viewpoint with additions such as the sculpted fireplace, textured barn board interior walls, and customized sandcast walls.

== Artworks ==
The Art Park displays many sculptures from the founder, Dorothy Riester, mixed in with rotating sculptures from artists-in-residence and collections around the world, including but not limited to works by Emilie Brzezinski, Rodger Mack, Enrique Saavedra, Esther Benedict, Christopher Gentner, Michael Kalish, and Takafumi Ide.
