= Jesús Carles de Vilallonga =

Spanish-Canadian figurative artist (1927–2018)

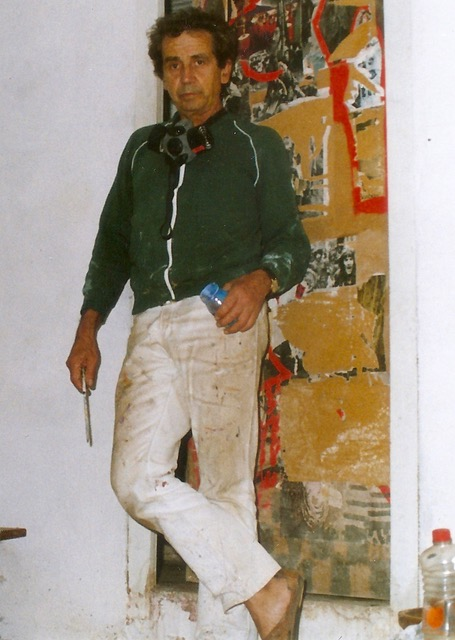
- Vilallonga in his studio in Cadaqués
- Born: March 10, 1927; Santa Coloma de Farners, Catalonia, Spain
- Died: August 5, 2018 (aged 91); Barcelona, Catalonia, Spain
- Known for: Painter, graphic artist, sculptor, printmaker, ceramicist
- Movement: Poetic Realism, Expressionism, Symbolism

Jesús Carles de Vilallonga i Rosell CQ (1927, Santa Coloma de Farners, Spain – 2018, Barcelona, Spain) was a Spanish/Canadian figurative artist who worked primarily in the medium of egg tempera. He is best known for his richly textured paintings in an intricate, highly colored style that is not easy even though everything is readily intelligible: male and females characters, beasts, forests, architectural structures and artifacts. Vilallonga's iconography draws from a broad and complex painting tradition ranging from Romanesque art, the Renaissance, and Surrealism, while maintaining his own contemporary style. His work is sometimes related to Symbolism and his production is always enhanced by the contributions of abstraction. He works with the "inner eye" which Freud described as the most profound and the most intelligent, in a sojourn through nature and man's hidden interior.

Vilallonga exhibited widely in Europe, Canada, and the United States and his oeuvre includes bronze and resin sculpture, watercolor paintings, design objects, and different print mediums including screen print, etching, lithography, and digital art. He was awarded the National Order of Québec in 2011 and Fill Predilecte in Santa Coloma de Farners, Spain in 2015.

== Life and career ==
The fourth child of Salvador de Vilallonga i Corominas and Maria Dolors Rosell i Planes de Farners, Jesús Carles Isidre de Vilallonga i Rosell was born on March 10, 1927. His father was a wealthy landowner whose family documents, now deposited in the Arxiu Comarcal de la Selva, date back to the 13th century. His parents were patrons of the arts and often had artists vacation at their summer home, the 15th-century family estate Mas Parés located in the village of Sant Martí Sapresa. At the age of five, Vilallonga made his first drawings there alongside the Catalan impressionist painter Joaquim Mir.

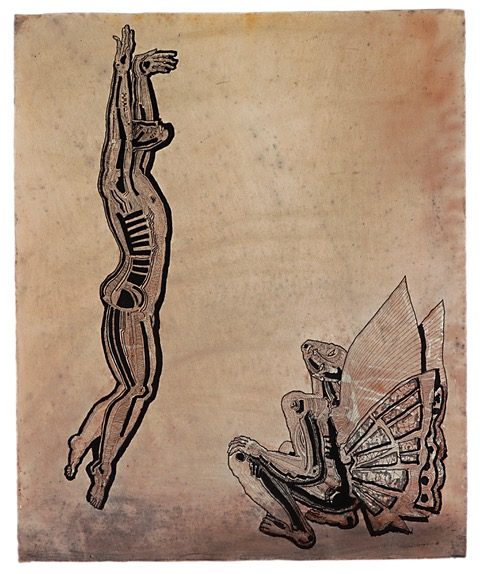
Flight/Vol, Mixed media drawing on paper, 2012

The Spanish Civil War (1936–1939) shattered the family's bucolic lifestyle. When Vilallonga was eleven years old, his father, Salvador de Vilallonga, who had been in hiding during much of the war, first in a secret part of the house, then later in artist's studio in Barcelona, was killed when he tried to cross over to France through the Pyrenees. Maria Dolors, with her eight children, left Santa Coloma de Farners and relocated to an apartment in Girona. In 1948, Vilallonga moved to Barcelona, where he studied drawing along with Joan Ponç at Ramón Rogent’s studio and took architecture classes at the University of Barcelona. Convinced that he wanted to dedicate his life to being an artist, he continued to exhibit and win prizes for his watercolor paintings, painted frescos in two different chapels, designed murals and mosaics for a large hotel on the Mediterranean coast, and studied painting with Marcel Gromaire at the École des Beaux-Arts in Paris. He traveled throughout Europe, stopping in Rome to visit his friend the painter Jaume Muxart, and finally ended up in Copenhagen, selling his recently painted watercolors in the squares of major cities along the way to pay his expenses.

In 1954, he accepted a mural commission in Montréal and that move proved decisive to his art career. To cover his expenses, he had the ingenious idea of painting watercolors of the wealthy homes in Westmount and selling the paintings to their owners. He sang and played the guitar in clubs, designed the costumes and set designs for a ballet at the National Ballet of Canada, and briefly taught Spanish at the Université de Montréal.

In 1958, Vilallonga signed an exclusive contract with Max Stern, owner of the prestigious Dominion Gallery in Montréal, who was responsible for introducing the contemporary European artists Henry Moore, Marino Marini, Van Dongen and Picabia in Canada. His early paintings were in oil in an expressionistic style, alongside his trademark egg tempera paintings on board. Vilallonga’s contract with the gallery continued for thirty years until the death of Stern.

Vilallonga married his first wife Madeleine Kirouac, a Canadian widow with two young daughters in 1959, and they had two more daughters Marta and Salvana. Vilallonga continued to paint prolifically while dividing his time between Cadaqués, Montréal, and Barcelona. In 1982, Vilallonga met Katherine Slusher, an American writer and art historian living in Barcelona. They were married in Saint-Jérôme, Quebec in 1989.

In 1992, they spent a year in Syracuse, New York, where Vilallonga studied sculpture under Rodger Mack and produced several bronze and aluminum sculptures at the Syracuse University foundry. The couple returned to Barcelona where Vilallonga worked for the next twenty years in his two studios in the Raval. In 1995, he became interested in using his computer to make digital drawings and continued experimenting with new technology creating born digital work and incorporating it in his other works on paper. The last five years of his life, he returned to the purity of paper and pencil, creating large scale drawings at home until his death in August, 2018.

Jesús Carles de Vilallonga’s paintings, sculptures, prints, and drawings are the subject of numerous books and documentaries and are in museums, universities, and private collections throughout the world. His extensive body of work has been exhibited in individual exhibitions at the Lefevre Gallery in London, Sagittarius Gallery in New York, Galería Juana Mordó in Madrid, Art Contemporain in Paris, Dau al Set in Barcelona, and multiple galleries in Canada. Retrospectives of his work were held at the Thousand Oaks Civic Arts Plaza in California in 2000, the Parisian Laundry in Montréal in 2006, and the Museu Casa de la Paraula in Spain in 2015. The Université de Montréal and Concordia University house large public works by Vilallonga. All of the documentation on Vilallonga's long and prolific career – exhibition catalogs, brochures, press reviews, magazine articles, publications, and over 3,000 photographs of his work – are available for consultation at the Arxiu in Santa Coloma de Farners.

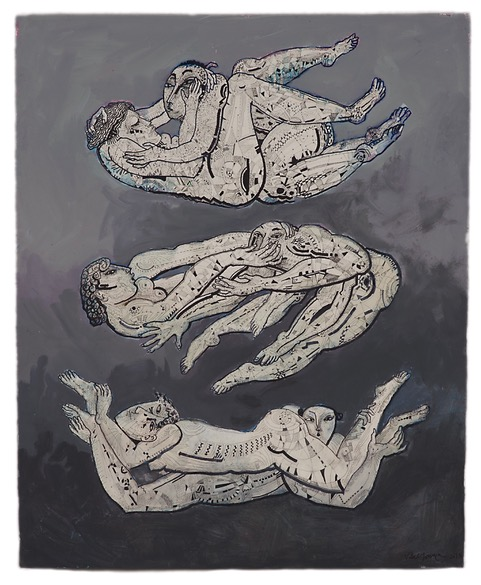
Tres Parelles, Mixed media drawing on paper, 141 x 115 cm., 2013

== Selected exhibitions ==
- 2020• Vilallonga, The Inner Eye, Espai Volart, Barcelona, Spain
- 2015• Painting Retrospective/Recent Drawings - Museu Centre Cultural Casa de la Paraula, Santa Coloma de Farners, Spain
- 2009• Galeria Article, Barcelona, Spain •Sala Joan Vinyoli, Santa Coloma de Farners
- 2007• Galerie Gala, Montréal, Canada
- 2006• Parisian Laundry, Montréal, Canada
- 2005• Installation Ceremony: Imaginary Portrait of 24 Universal Geniuses of Today, Concordia University, Montréal, Canada •Galeria Uranga, Bilbao, Spain
- 2004• Galerie Gala, Montréal, Canada
- 2003• Galeria Uranga, Bilbao, Spain •Galeria Article 26, Barcelona, Spain
- 2002• Photokina, Cologne, Germany •Galerie Gala, Montréal, Canada •Galeria Expoart, Girona, Spain
- 2001• Galerie Madeleine Lacerte, Québec, Canada
- 2000• Retrospective Exhibition: Poetic Symbolism from Barcelona, Civic Arts Plaza, Thousand Oaks, California •Galeria Article 26, Barcelona, Spain
- 1999• Galeria Article 26, Barcelona •Galerie d’Art du Mont-Sainte-Anne, Beaupré, Canada •Galerie Sous Le Passe-Partout, Montréal, Canada
- 1998• Galerie Gala, Trois-Rivières, Canada •Château Laurier, Ottawa
- 1997• Galeria d’Art Farners, Santa Coloma de Farners, Spain
- 1996• Galerie de Bellefeuille, Montréal, Canada •Galeria Ferlandina, Barcelona •Galeria Expoart, Girona, Spain
- 1995• Galerie d'art Jean-Claude Bergeron, Ottawa •Galerie d'art Vincent, Château Laurier, Ottawa •Fundació Vilallonga, Sant Marti Sapresa, Spain •Galerie d’Art du Mont-Sainte-Anne, Beaupré, Canada •Galerie Gala, Trois-Rivières

== Museum and public collections ==
- Concordia University, Montréal
- Musée des Beaux-Arts de Montréal, Canada
- Musée d’Art Contemporain, Montréal
- Bibliothèque Nationale de Paris, France
- Biblioteca Nacional de España, Madrid, Spain
- Biblioteca Nacional de Catalunya, Barcelona
- Bibliothèque et Archives nationales du Québec
- Université de Montréal
- Musée national des beaux-arts du Québec
- Museu Nacional d’Art de Catalunya, Barcelona
- Fundació Vila Casas, Barcelona
- MuseoaBilbao, Bilbao
- Syracuse University Art Collection, New York
- University of Toronto Art Museum, Hart House, Toronto
- Bibliothèque Nationale du Canada, Ottawa
- Museu d’Art de Girona, Catalunya
- Musée de l’Université de Sherbrooke, Québec
- Château Saint Fargeau, Yonne, France
- Richards Gallery, Northeastern University, Boston
- Lehigh University Art Collection, Pennsylvania
- Art Gallery of Hamilton, Canada
- Art Gallery of Greater Victoria, Canada
- Art Gallery of Alberta, Canada
- Kitchener-Waterloo Art Gallery, Canada
- Museu de Cadaqués, Catalunya

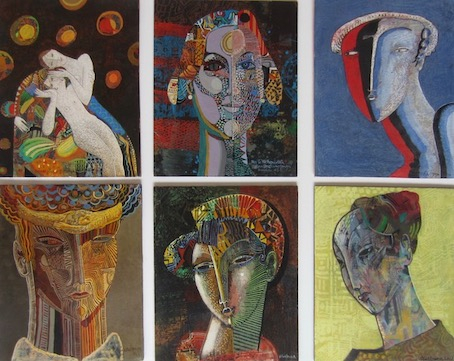

== Publications ==
- Vilallonga, The Inner Eye, Espai Volart, Barcelona, 2020 ISBN 978-8409199419
- Jesús de Vilallonga, Drawings, Symbols and Signs, Museu Casa de la Paraula, Santa Coloma de Farners, 2015 ISBN 8460686329 ISBN 978-8460686323
- Vull Inventar Jesús Vilallonga, Ajuntament de Santa Coloma de Farners, 2015 ISBN 8460691276 ISBN 978-8460691273
- Cent anys de pintura a Cadaqués, Tharrats, Joan Josep, Parsifal Edicions, Barcelona, 2007 ISBN 8495554275 ISBN 978-8495554277
- Vilallonga, Parisian Laundry, Montréal, Québec, 2006
- Livre d' Heures, Vilallonga, Jesús de, Editions Leméac, Montréal, 2005 ISBN 2760932680 ISBN 978-2760932685
- Le regard des mots, Vigneault, Gilles et Vilallonga, J.C. de, Ed. Broquet, Montréal, Québec, 2005 ISBN 2-89000-683-2
- Salvador Dalí en el seu entorn de Cadaqués, Keeler, Tony, Ed. Ajuntament de Cadaqués, Catalunya, 2004
- Vilallonga: Poetic Symbolism from Barcelona, Thousand Oaks, California, 2000 ISBN 0-9700887-0-1.
- Vilallonga: Les lieux du rêve / Cloister of Dreams, De Moura Sobral, Luís Editions Broquet (bilingual edition), Montréal, 1993 ISBN 2890003728 ISBN 978-2890003729
- J.C. Vilallonga: Poet of Inner Vision, Spicer, Malcolm Editorial Juventud, Barcelona, 1978
- Surréalisme Català, Galeria Dau al Set, Barcelona, 1976
- Vilallonga, Descharnes, Robert Editorial Juventud (French and English editions), Barcelona, 1971

== Films ==
- Documentary, series Carte Blanche-Portraits culturels, Vilallonga artiste peintre, Radio-Quebec Television, 56 min., 1995
- Jesús Carles de Vilallonga – Fondre l'art, Radio-Quebec Television, 28 min., 1997

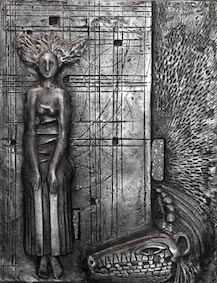
Cloister of Dreams, sculpture,1993

== Livre d'Artiste ==
- Sur L'îlot De Cupidon, Péloquin, Claude, Vilallonga, Jesús de, Montréal, 2007
- Terre de Femme, Péloquin, Claude, Vilallonga, J.C., Montréal, 2005
- Rencontre, Vigneault, Gilles, Vilallonga, Jesús de, Québec, 2003
- Soleil-Soleil, Péloquin, Claude, Vilallonga, Jesús de, Montréal, 1996
