= Carles Blasi Vidal =

Andorran politician (born 1964)

Carles Blasi Vidal (born February 21, 1964) is an Andorran politician. He is a member of the Social Democratic Party.
