= Carlos Julio Villar Aleman =

Cuban artist

Carlos Julio Villar Aleman, pen name Carlucho, (born October 1, 1946, in Cárdenas, Matanzas, Cuba) is a self-taught creator of humorous drawings, known as "Cuba's foremost caricaturist".

Since 1990, he resided in Mexico City, Mexico, and moved to Miami, Florida, in 2003, where he became an Art Instructor for disabled children. Since 1980, he has been a member of the Unión de Escritores y Artistas de Cuba (UNEAC) in Havana, Cuba. In 1983, he was a Juror at the III Biennial Internacional de Humorismo in San Antonio de los Baños, Havana, Cuba.

== Press publication ==
Villar's first work was published in 1969 in the Cuban publication Juventad Rebelde, where he continued to work until 1974. His cartoons have since been published in many Mexican and American publications, including Newsweek.

== Individual exhibitions ==
In 1980 he exhibited "René de la Nuez and Carlucho" at the FITIL Movie Theater in Moscow, Russia. In 1985 he presented "30 Obras de Humor Político de Carlucho" in Michoacan, Mexico. In 1988 presented his works "Desde el blanco hasta el negro" at the Galería Juan David in Centro Cinematográfico Yara, Havana, Cuba. In 1990 he exhibited "Sobran las palabras" at the Castillo de la Real Fuerza in Havana, Cuba.

== Collective exhibitions ==
He also participated in many collective exhibitions, including Salón'70 (1970) at the Museo Nacional de Bellas Artes in Havana, Cuba and the II International Cartoon Exhibition (1977) in Athens, Greece with his exhibit "Good Morning Pollution". He also participated in the III (1977) and IV (1979) International Biennial of Humor and Satire in Art with "The World exists because it laughs" at the House of Humor and Satire in Gabrovo, Bulgary. He was one of the selected artists for 60 Rassegna Internazionale di Satira e Umorismo. Trento Fra Realtà e Follia (1984), which featured his "Peccati di gola" work, at the Studio d'Arte Andromeda in Trento, Italy. He was included in Collective Sample of Humorism (1995) at the Espaço Mascarenhas in Minas Gerais, Brazil.

== Awards ==
He has won many distinctions and awards. He won first prize in the To Be or not to Be Contest of Satirical Drawings in Poland magazine of Warsaw, Poland in 1975. In 1980, he was recognized with the third prize for a comic strip at Le 171 Salon International de la Caricature at Terre des Hommes, Pavillon International de l'Humor in Montreal, Canada. In 1986, he was awarded the IX Prize in the 25th International Cartoon Festival Knokke Heist at Humorhall Duinbergen in Knokke Heist, Belgium.

== Collections ==
In Cuba his works can be found in the Museo del Humor in San Antonio de los Baños, Havana, Cuba as well as the Museo Nacional de Bellas Artes de La Habana.
