= Carlos (2023 film) =

- Official film poster
- Directed by: Rudy Valdez
- Produced by: Rudy Valdez; Sara Bernstein; Leopoldo Gout; Liz Morhaim
- Cinematography: Rudy Valdez
- Edited by: Viridiana Lieberman
- Music by: Carlos Santana
- Production companies: Sony Music Entertainment; Imagine Documentaries
- Distributed by: Sony Pictures Classics; Trafalgar Releasing
- Release date: September 23, 2023
- Running time: 87 minutes
- Country: United States
- Language: English
- Box office: $432, 200

Carlos is a 2023 American documentary film about American guitarist Carlos Santana.

== Reception ==
On review aggregator website Rotten Tomatoes, the film holds an approval rating of 100% based on 19 reviews, with an average rating of 7.2/10.
