= Carles Delclaux Is =

Spanish textile artist

Carles Delclaux Is (born 1951, Sant Cugat del Vallès) is a Catalan textile artist trained in the Aymat factory and in the Massana School of Fine Arts in Barcelona.

== Career ==
From 1970 to 1974 he directed the Catalan School of Tapestry.

He has recreated works of many artists, reinterpreting: Josep Grau-Garriga Joan-Josep Tharrats, Josep Maria Subirachs, Joan Miró, Manuel Millares, José Beulas, Modest Cuixart, Pere Lloses, Domènec Fita, Narcís Comadira, Juan José Torralba, Francesc Torres i Monsó, Marcel Martí and others.

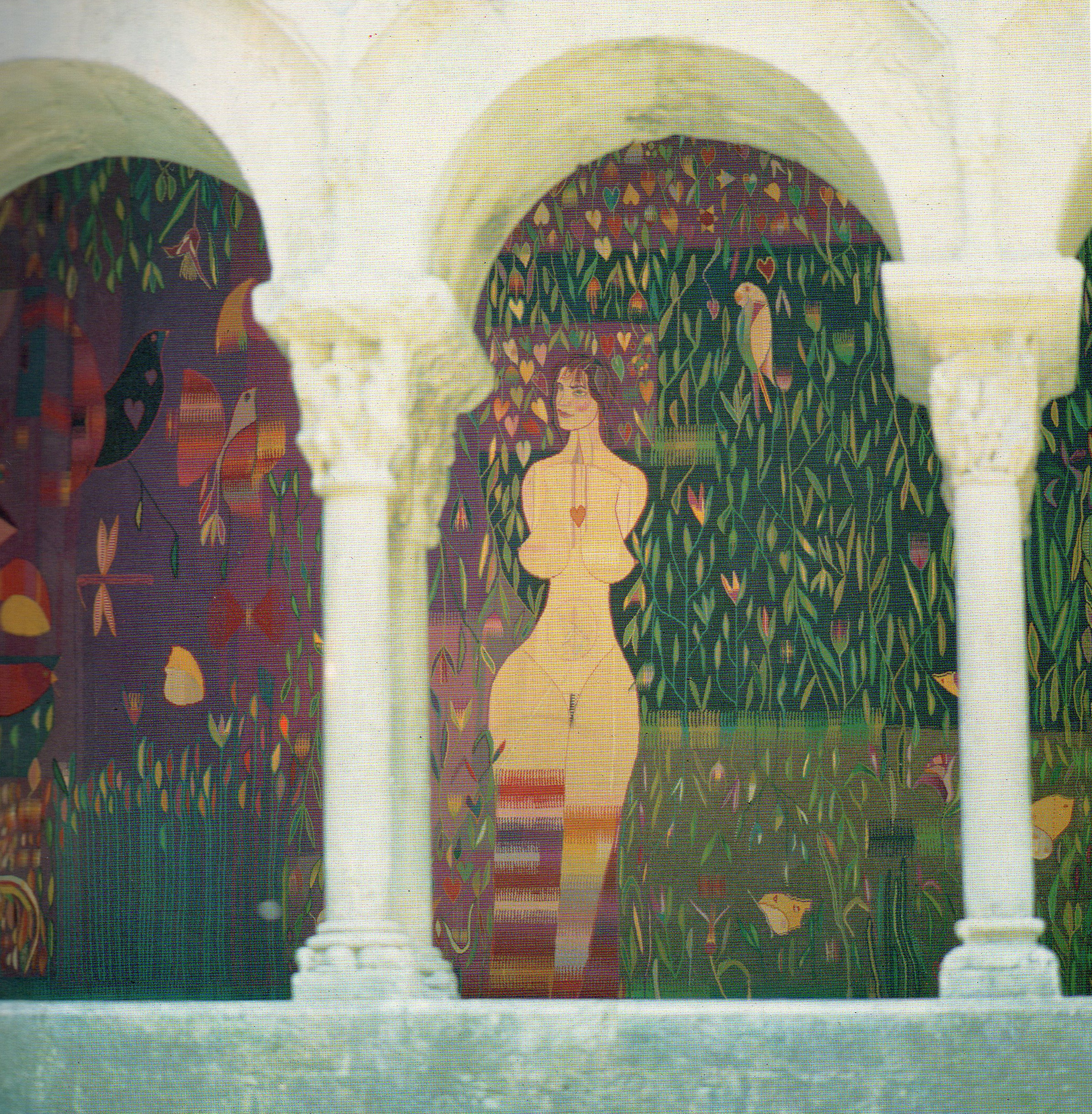
"L'Empordanet", tapestry fragment, 350x700 cm., Carles Delclaux, 1981

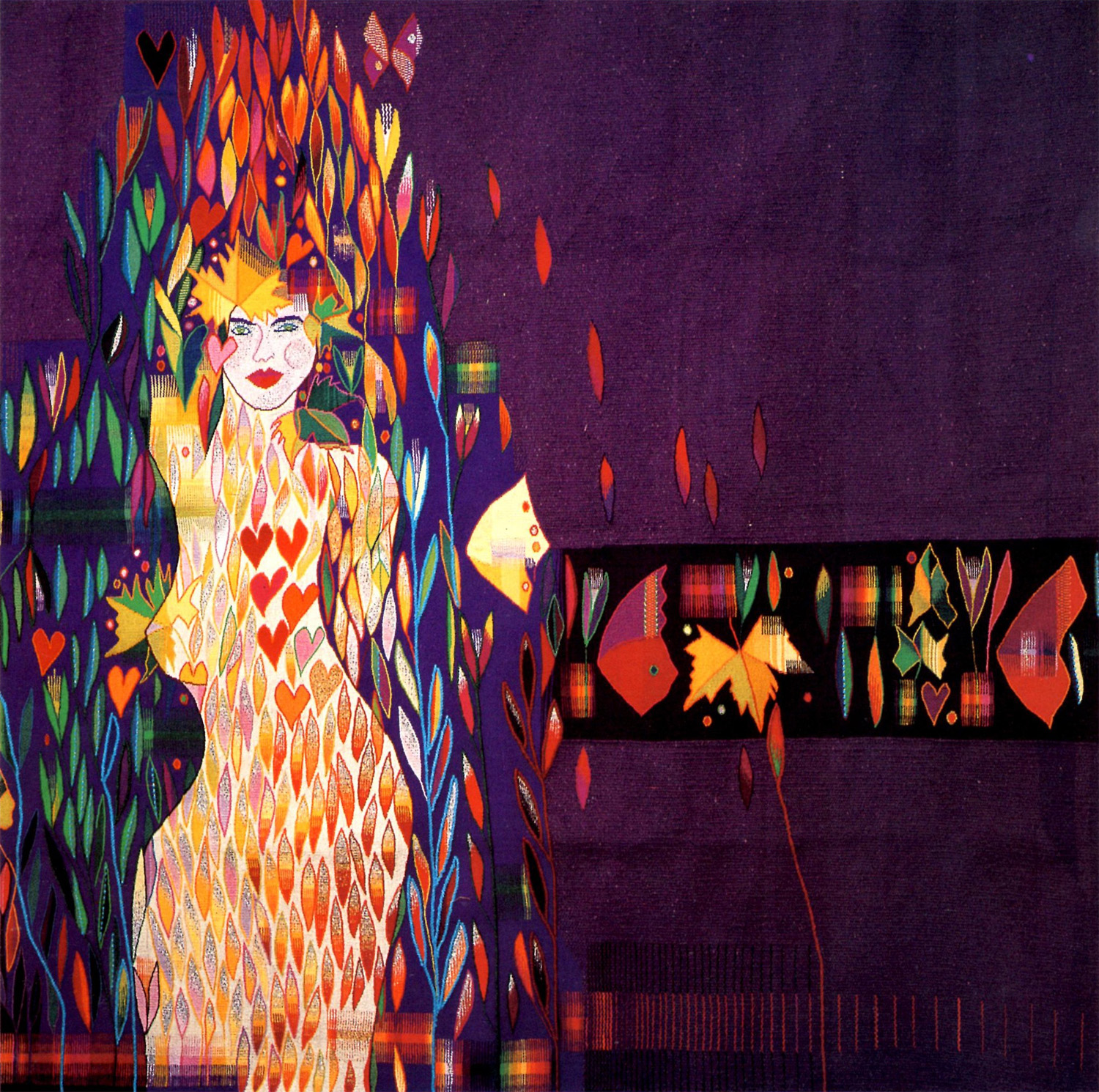
"Damunt de tu només les flors", tapestry, 210x300 cm., Carles Delclaux, 1981

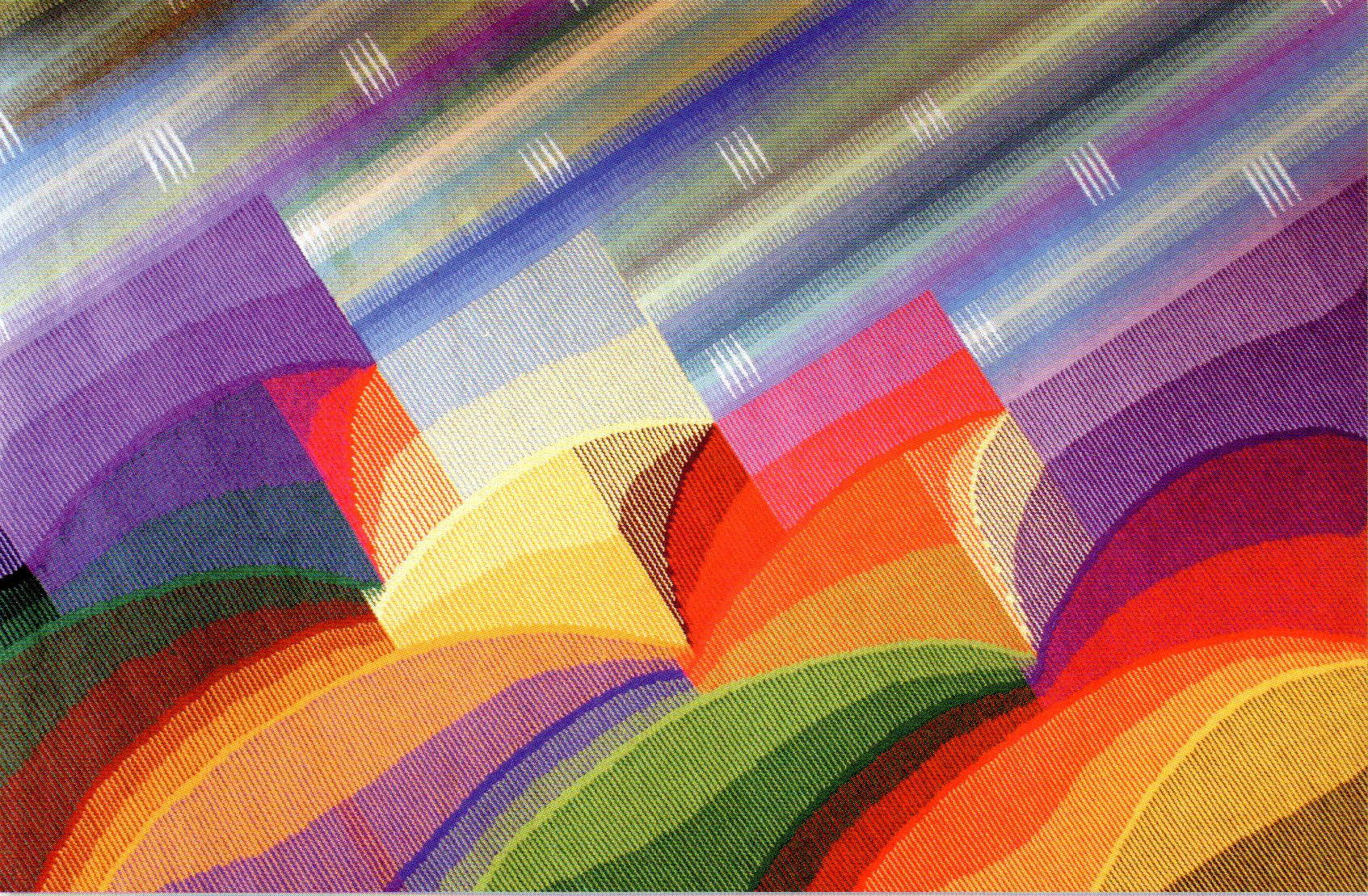
"Corinti", tapestry, 200x300 cm., Carles Delclaux, 2007

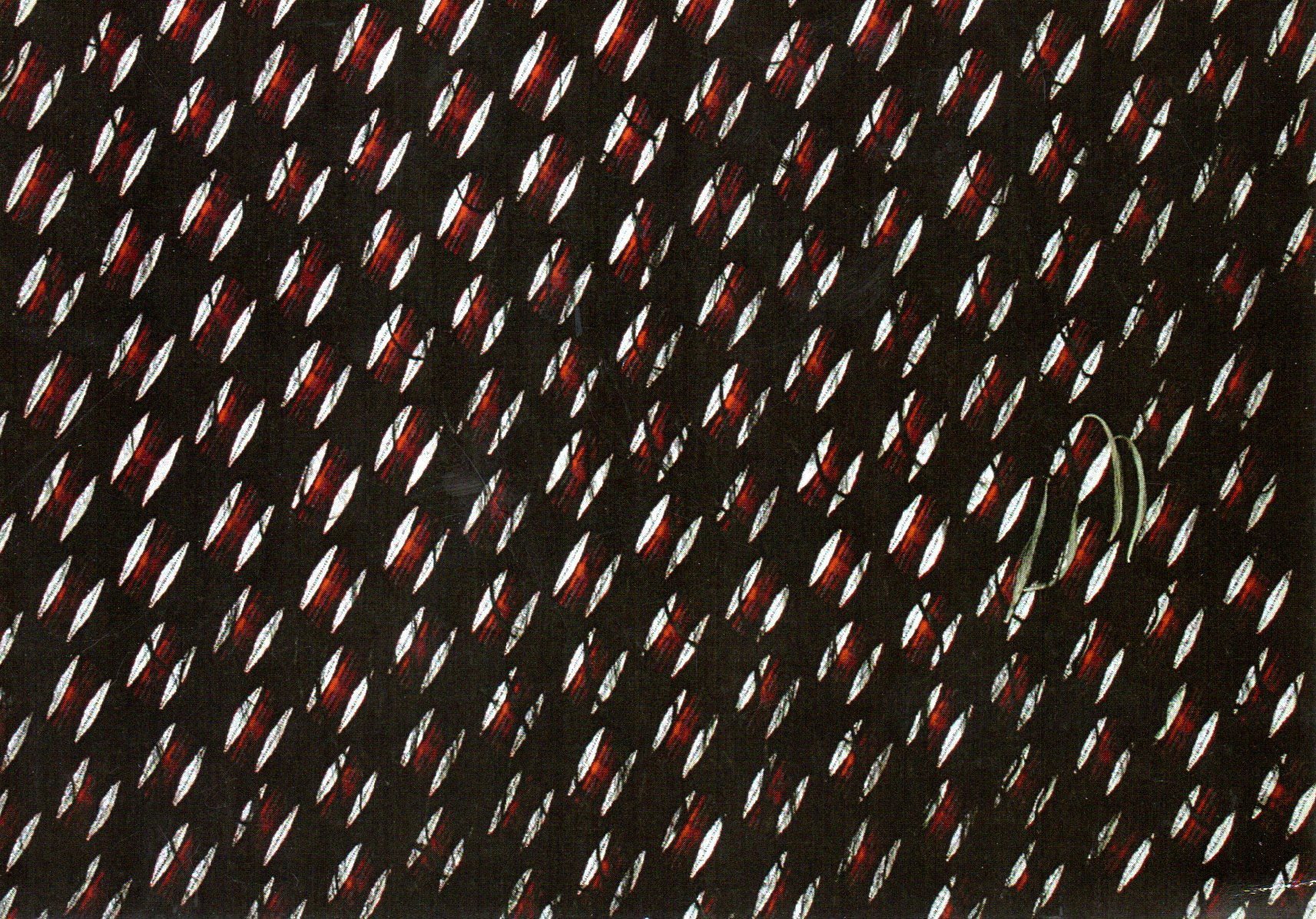
"Espermatofèminis", tapestry, 200x300 cm., Carles Delclaux, 2009

His work has been featured in museums such as MACBA, Centro de Arte y Naturaleza, Contemporary Tapestry Museum-Casa, Museu Téxtil de Terrassa, and others, as well as private collections and public institutions.

== Sexual abuse ==
In April 2010, Delclaux was condemned to six years in prison for repeatedly abusing and raping one of his twin daughters between the ages 7 to 14. He went into prison in July 2011. Both daughters accused him, but the court considered there was not enough evidence to also condemn him for the abuse of the other daughter. The daughters declared that Delclaux used the moments when he was alone with the children to grope, abuse and rape them. He also repeatedly threatened them to kill them if they said anything about the abuse. This situation kept going until the daughter started menstruating, at fourteen, where Delclaux stopped, afraid to impregnate her.

== Gallery ==
Miró, Delclaux and Royo. First version of Tarragona tapestry. Aymat Factory, 1970

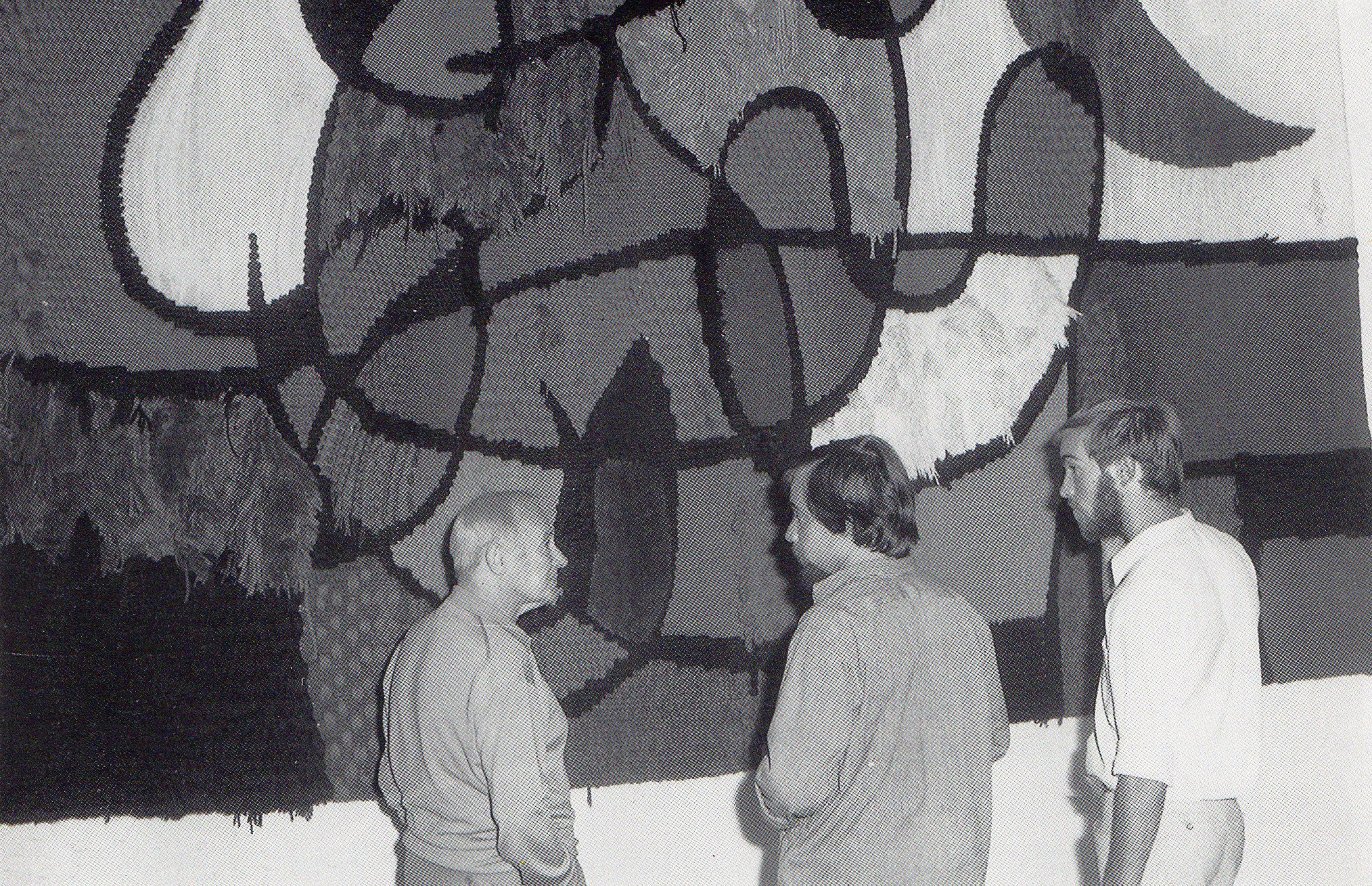

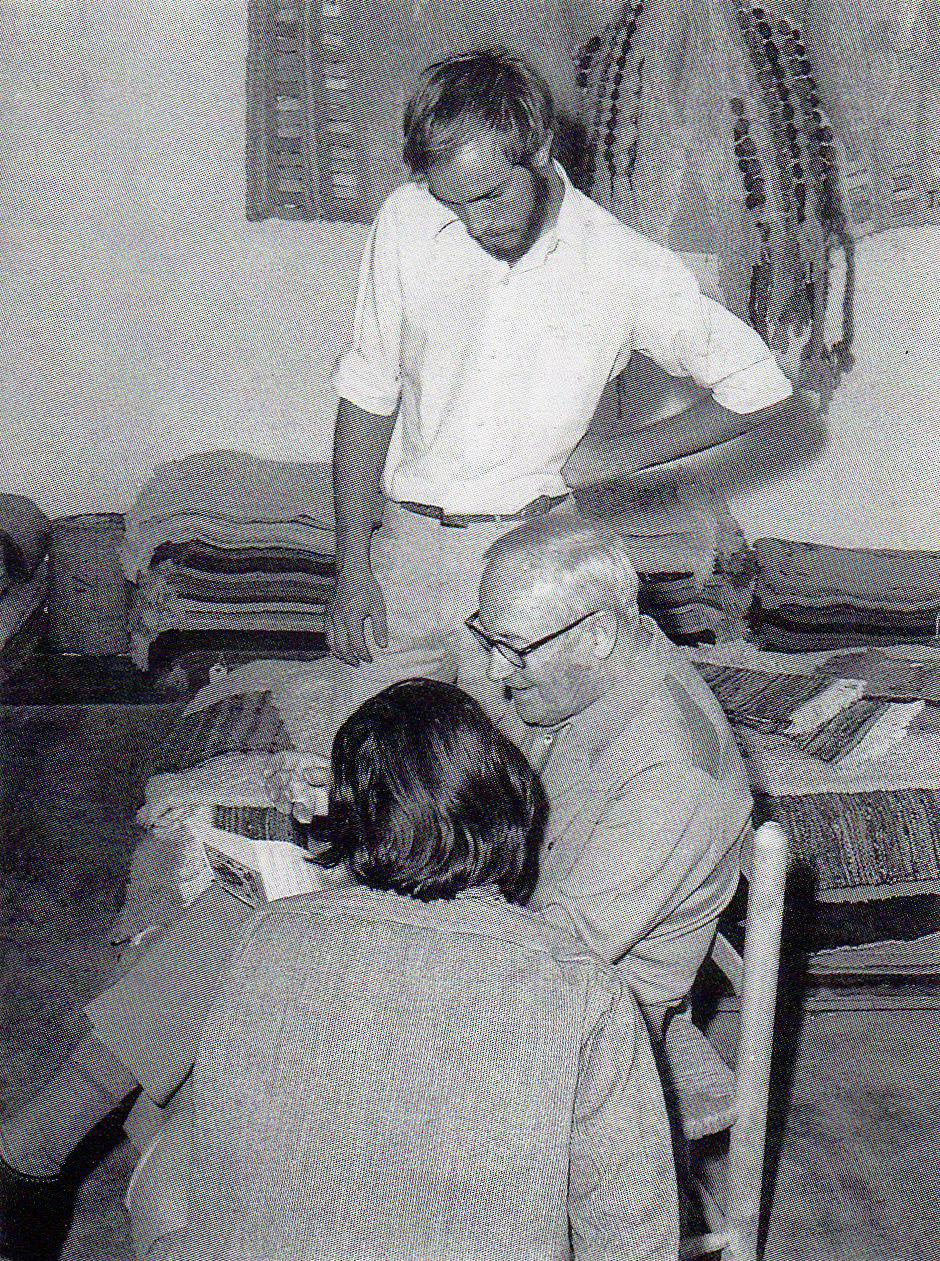
