= Sant Carles =

Sant Carles (Catalan from Saint Charles) may refer to:

- Sant Carles de la Ràpita, town in the area of the Montsià
- Sant Carles de Peralta, village in the north east of Ibiza
