= Carlos Cisneros (basketball) =

Argentine basketball player

Personal information
- Born: 24 November 1933 (age 92)
Medals
Men's basketball
Representing Argentina
Pan American Games
| Silver medal – second place | 1955 Mexico City | Team |

Carlos Cisneros (born 24 November 1933) is an Argentine former basketball player.
