= Carlos Urbizo =

Honduran politician and businessman

Carlos Urbizo Solís
- Born: November 22, 1943 (age 82); La Ceiba, Honduras
- Education: Franklin & Marshall College
- Occupations: Politician, Businessman, and Economist
- Notable work: Déficit Fiscal, Deuda Pública, y la Quiebra del Gobierno, Transformación Cultural
- Political party: National Party of Honduras
- Website: https://urbizopresidente.com/

Carlos Urbizo Solís is a Honduran politician, economist and businessman. Throughout his career as a financial consultant, he has shared his insights on the development of the Honduran economy through interviews, university lectures, and the publication of several books focused on economics and culture.

Currently, he is one of the presidential pre-candidates for the National Party of Honduras for the 2026-2030 term, under the movement Rescate y Transformación (Rescue and Transformation).

== Early life ==
Carlos Urbizo was born in La Ceiba, Honduras on November 22, 1943.

=== Studies and professional experience ===
He attended high school on a scholarship at Saint John's College, a Jesuit boarding school in Belize. Afterward, he was awarded a Fulbright Scholarship, and pursued his studies in the United States. Urbizo graduated with honors in Business Administration from Franklin & Marshall College in Lancaster, Pennsylvania.

In addition to his higher education, Urbizo completed specialized courses in marketing and finance at Harvard University, Stanford University, INCAE, and the New York Institute of Finance. He also holds accreditation as a Certified Public Accountant (CPA) in California (USA).

=== His analysis of the Honduran economy ===
Carlos Urbizo is recognized for his extensive knowledge of the Honduran economy, frequently consulted by the media and participating in university conferences. Additionally, he has contributed to the analysis and development of economic policies through his published books. Among his most notable works are Déficit Fiscal, Deuda Pública, y la Quiebra del Gobierno (Fiscal Deficit, Public Debt, and Government Bankruptcy), and Transformación Cultural (Cultural Transformation).

In his public statements Urbizo has been a vocal critic of the lack of democracy in Honduras, identifying it as a major factor contributing to the stagnation of the country's economy and the decline in foreign investment. The economist stated that Honduras needs deep reforms in its fiscal and monetary systems to attract investment and improve the quality of life for its citizens. Additionally, he highlights the need to adjust tax laws to create a more favorable environment for economic growth.

In public interviews, he criticized the increase in the Monetary Policy Rate (Tasa de Política Monetaria, TPM), announced by the Central Bank of Honduras (Banco Central de Honduras, BCH) in October 2024, calling it "nonsense". He compared the country's economy to a "malnourished patient", who instead of receiving more food is suffering from a cut.

"The economy needs low rates, reduced taxes, government investment, and spending. With this measure, the cost of money will rise, and will only worsen the situation for those seeking financing for consumption and investment." Carlos Urbizo

== Political career ==
Urbizo got first involved in politics in 1997 when he joined Nora Gúnera de Melgar's movement within the National Party as her designated successor.

In 2009, Urbizo supported the interim government of Roberto Micheletti, arguing that the removal of former President Manuel Zelaya was necessary due to what he described as Zelaya's "abuses of power." Urbizo asserted that the international community misunderstood the situation, emphasizing that Zelaya's dismissal was essential to prevent his attempts to modify the constitution and remain in power.

=== Candidacy for the presidency of Honduras ===
In 2024, Urbizo officially launched his candidacy for the presidency of Honduras under the Rescate y Transformación movement of the National Party. Key figures in his campaign include the businessman Melvin José Ferraro, the candidate for mayor of San Pedro Sula.

In the Honduras primary elections scheduled for March 9, 2025, Urbizo will contend against other pre-candidates from the National Party, including former Tegucigalpa mayor Nasry Asfura and Ana García de Hernández, wife of former president Juan Orlando Hernández.
