= Roberto Chacón =

Venezuelan footballer (born 1999)

Personal information
- Full name: Roberto Carlos Chacón Rodríguez
- Date of birth: 25 April 1999 (age 27)
- Place of birth: San Juan de Colón, Venezuela
- Height: 1.83 m (6 ft 0 in)
- Position: Right-back

Youth career
- Deportivo Táchira

Senior career*
Years	Team	Apps	(Gls)
2015–2018	Deportivo Táchira	2	(0)
2019	→ Trujillanos (loan)	8	(0)
2019	→ Monagas (loan)	16	(0)
2019	Monagas	23	(0)
2020	Cúcuta Deportivo	0	(0)
2020	Angostura FC		
2021	Ureña		
2022	Yaracuyanos		
2023	Héroes de Falcón		

International career
2018	Venezuela U20	10	(0)
- * Club domestic league appearances and goals as of 21:03, 6 August 2020 (UTC)

Roberto Carlos Chacón Rodríguez (born 25 April 1999) is a Venezuelan footballer who plays as a right-back.

== Career ==
=== Club career ===
Chacón spent all his youth years at Deportivo Táchira and made his professional debut on 20 July 2016, playing all 90 minutes against Atlético Venezuela in the Venezuelan Primera División.

In the summer 2017, he was loaned out to Trujillanos to get some experience, where he made a total of eight appearances. In the beginning of January 2018 it was confirmed, that 18-year old Chacón had joined Monagas on loan for the whole year with an option to buy 50% of his rights. He continued for Monagas in the 2019 season and made a total of 43 appearances in his two years at the club, before he left at the end of 2019.

On 9 January 2020 Colombian club Cúcuta Deportivo confirmed the signing of Chacón. However, only five days later, it was reported that the cooperation had been terminated by mutual consent. According to a journalist, the decision was made by Cucuta's president, who wasn't impressed by Chacón. He returned to Venezuela and joined Angostura FC.

On 23 March 2021, Chacón joined Ureña. In 2022, Chacón was playing for Yaracuyanos. In January 2023, he moved to Héroes de Falcón.
