= Roy Carless =

Canadian cartoonist (1920–2009)

Roy "Roi" Carless (October 3, 1920–January 2, 2009) was a Canadian cartoonist. His cartoons were syndicated across Canada and the United States, and he is considered one of Canada's most productive cartoonists.

== Biography ==
Born in York County, Ontario in 1920, Roy was first published at the age of 14 in the school newspaper at Runnymede Collegiate in Toronto. His father was an athlete and Chief of Police in Swansea, where Roy explored the community between High Park and the Humber River, observing the differences between life as lived and as perceived and recorded. He said his first drawing instruction came from an architectural student who, courting Roy's older sister, needed to keep the youngster occupied with something else. Receiving no formal art training, Carless was inspired and mentored by the late Duncan Macpherson, editorial cartoonist for the Toronto Star, who nominated Carless to membership in the Association of American Editorial Cartoonists in 1971. Roy was the first labour cartoonist to be accepted by the organization.

Most of Carless' originals are now in Canada's national archives (Library and Archives Canada). Copies are also in several Presidential libraries and in university collections. His work has hung in shows in the Art Gallery of Ontario, the International Salon of Cartoons in Montreal, the Winnipeg Art Gallery, the Art Gallery of Hamilton, the Hamilton Public Library, the Museum of Natural History, the Museum of Civilization and the Parliament Buildings in Ottawa, the National Headquarters of the Canadian Labour Council, and shows in the cities of Quebec, Paris, Boston, Washington, and the Vatican.

In 2006, Seraphim Editions published a retrospective of Roy Carless' life and work titled "the Carless Cartoon Collection, not bad for an old bastard."

Carless died Friday morning, January 2, 2009, in Hamilton, Ontario. He was 88.

== Cartoons ==
Signed as "Roi", Carless cartoons have been published in independent and labour publications in both official languages and in every province of Canada right to the Arctic Circle. His work has appeared in each of the United States and its territories from Guam to Puerto Rico. At his peak, Carless created for more than twenty publications with a combined circulation exceeding three million copies, drawing to meet the specific needs of each publication. Remarkably, he did this while working full-time on an assembly line in Hamilton, Canada, and while chief steward of the union that represented employees in the plant.

"I worked with a witty bunch of guys; my editorial board was the guys at the shop," Roy said about the inspiration for much of his humour.
