= Carlos Bunga =

Portuguese visual artist

- Born: 1976 (age 49–50); Porto, Portugal
- Education: Escuela Superior de Diseño de Caldas de Rainha (ESAD)
- Occupation: Visual artist
- Organization(s): Represented by: Galería Elba Benítez, Madrid, Galería Vera Cortés, Lisboa y Alexander & Bonin Gallery, New York, Nara Roesler Galeria (Brasil)

Carlos Bunga (born 1976) is a Portuguese artist. He is known for his installations out of mass-produced materials, like cardboard, duct tape and home paint, questioning architecture as a language of power and other inertias related to it, like order and solidity.

== Biography ==
Carlos Bunga was born in 1976 in Porto, where he lived with his mother and siblings. In 1978, they were transferred to the old prison of Forte de Peniche, transformed in a center to receive refugees, where they lived for five years until moved to official protection housing in the same area.

In 1998, at 23 years old, he started his fine arts studies at the Escola Superior de Artes e Design de Caldas da Rainha. In 2003 he won the EDP Novos Artistas prize of Serralves and in 2004 he participated in Manifesta 5 in San Sebastián, Spain, which was his first international exhibition.

He lives and works in Barcelona.

== Work ==
=== Surface ===
Bunga's interest towards plastic arts starts with painting while being a student at the faculty of Fine Arts. "Paint is directly or indirectly present in all my works. It's my thoughts' basis, a multifaceted place, filled with layers, perspectives and smells", he said. Since the beginnings, he works painting in its expanded version, which allows him to create polychromatic and wrapping environments where paint is experimented with the body.

=== Space ===
The site-specific installations stem from the direct experience with the workspace. As a predetermined project doesn't exist – nothing is designed or previously planned to be built. He builds transitory and precarious architecture out of humble materials that create a fiction with the preexistent architecture, altering circulation and the specific interiors’ perception.

Chus Martínez says:

Each new artwork feeds from the previous one, reincorporates old textures, rethinks chromatisms, reformulates scale, etc., each new site-specific has a dialogic relationship with its previous artworks. So each new project orients us towards a problem that stays during its whole practice: like new life is possible.

In several occasions, the installations present themselves as an architecture that defies another one, that fragments it to see it again. Once these projects are finished, they give way to the set of drawings that come up like a search of conceptual possibilities and of overcoming the space's formal and spacial restrictions. They are the post-projects' notebooks.

=== Action ===
Bunga, influenced during his career's beginnings by the Grupo Gutai, often makes interventions on his site-specific installations, accelerating the piece's transformation or decaying process and accentuating the contrast and tension between the construction process, that tends to last around two or three weeks, and the transformation process, that lasts less than an hour. His work is based on a complex time system, oscillating between altered temporalities and sudden accelerations. By speeding up his constructions’ life cycle, Bunga emphasizes architecture's fragility and unstableness, that at the same time functions as a metaphor for life itself. Many of his works’ ephemeral character and his construction's unveiled fragility immediately provoke evocations of a literary nature and associations with issues related to urban and social landscapes.

=== Object ===
The models series titled Untitled. Model (2002) are Bunga's first works where he explores his interest on architecture; quickly he starts having a problematic relationship with these impossible architectures and he starts playing with their scale to be able to achieve this models on a 1:1 scale – human scaled models, built like paintings, as three-dimensional installations of visual ideas. Bunga also makes interventions on domestic furniture, creating a different link with these two realities. In other more recent works, objects become elements from our imagination, like the Casulhos (2017) made in ceramic or cardboard, in which he manifests again his interest on the telluric transformation idea

== Exhibitions ==
Bunga had his first individual exhibition in the art gallery Galería Elba Benítez in Madrid (2005). In 2007, his work is included in the exhibition Unmonumental in the New Museum in New York, curated by Massimiliano Gioni, Richard Flood and Laura Hoptman. In 2009, the Miami Art Museum presented his first exhibition in an American museum, and he later has projects in the Hammer Museum in Los Angeles (2011) and the Museum of Contemporary Art Detroit (2018), among others. He also participates in Latin museums, like the Pinacoteca de São Paulo (2012) and the Museo de Arte de la Universidad Nacional de Colombia (2015).

He has also had numerous individual exhibitions in European museums, like the Fundación Serralves in Porto (2012), Haus Konstruktiv in Zurich (2015), Museo de Arte Contemporáneo de Barcelona, MACBA (2015), Museu de Arte, Arquitetura e Tecnologia in Lisbon – where his work was object for an exhaustive study for the exhibition curated by Iwona Blazwick –, Whitechapel in London (2020), Secession in Vienna (2021), Schirn Kunsthalle in Frankfurt (2022) and the Palacio de Cristal, Museo Centro de Arte Reina Sofía de Madrid (2022)

He participates in many group exhibitions. Among them, the Chicago Architecture Biennial (2015), the Bienal de São Paulo (2010) and Manifesta 5 (2004).

=== Individual exhibitions ===
- Contra la extravagancia del deseo. Palacio de Cristal, Museo Nacional Centro de Arte Reina Sofía. 2022, Madrid, España.
- El lloc on cada dia abandonem el món. MAC Mataró. 2022, Mataró, Spain.
- Home. CAM em Movimento, Fundação Calouste Gulbenkian. 2022, Mataró, Spain.
- Carlos Bunga. Schirn Kunsthalle Frankfurt. 2022, Frankfurt, Germany.
- Mind awake, body asleep. Secession. 2021, Vienna, Austria.
- Something Necessary and Useful. Whitechapel Gallery. 2020, London, United Kingdom.
- A Sudden Beginning. MOCA Toronto. 2020, Toronto, Canada.
- Carlos Bunga. The Architecture of Life. The Architecture of Life. Environments, Sculptures, Paintings and Films. Museo de Arte, Arquitectura e Tecnologia. 2019, Lisbon, Portugal.
- Carlos Bunga. Where I am Free. Fundação Carmona y Costa. 2019, Lisbon, Portugal.
- Carlos Bunga: Doubled Architecture. Museum of Contemporary Art Detroit. 2018, Detroit, USA.
- Capella. Museo de Arte Contemporaneo de Barcelona. 2015, Barcelona, Spain.
- Desplazamientos síquicos. Museo de la Universidad Nacional de Colombia. 2016, Bogotá, Colombia.
- I am a Nomad. Museum Haus Konstruktiv. 2015, Zurich, Sweden.
- Exodus. National Museum Wales, Cardiff. 2014, Cardiff, Wales.
- Por amor a la disidencia. Museo Amparo. 2014, Puebla, Mexico.
- Ecosystem. Grand Rapids Public Museum. 2013, Michigan, USA.
- Por amor a la disidencia. Museo Universitario de Arte Contemporáneo. 2013, Mexico City, Mexico.
- Proyecto de Sonaeo/Serralves: Patricia Dauder y Carlos Bunga. Museo Serralves. 2012, Porto, Portugal.
- Mausoléu. Pinacoteca do Estado São Paulo. 2012, São Paulo, Brasil.
- Carlos Bunga. Hammer Museum. 2011, Los Angeles, USA.
- Espacio mental. OPA. 2010, Guadalajara, Mexico.
- Metamorphosis. Miami Art Museum. 2009, Miami, USA.
- Heterotopías. Maro Vigo. 2009, Vigo, Spain.
- Empty Cube. Appleton Square. 2009, Lisboa, Portugal.
- Culturgest Project. Culturgest. 2005. Lisboa, Portugal.

== Residencies ==
Since the beginnings of his career, he had several international residencies, including: The Josef and Anni Albers Foundation in Ireland (2022); The Watermill Center in Watermill (2017); MOCA Tucson (2014); International Studio & Curatorial Program (ISCP) in New York (2006); Helsinki International artist in Residence Program, HIAP, Helsinki (2005) and Aldaba Art México (2007).

== Bibliography ==
=== Artist books ===
- 2022. Yuxtaposiciones. Texts by Manuel Guerrero and Paulo Miyada. Tinta Invisible, Barcelona.
- 2021. Future Earth. Colouring Book. Glynn Vivian Art Gallery, Swansea.
- 2020. DNA Vol.2. Artphilein Editions, Lugano.
- 2020. Secession. Text by Ainhoa González. Revolver Publishing, Berlin.
- 2019. Nomad. Fundação Carmona e Costa, Lisbon.
- 2017. Carlos Bunga: Time / Temporality. Cru, Barcelona.
- 2015. DNA. Artphilein Editions, Lugano.

=== Publications ===
- 2020. Carlos Bunga: Something Necessary and Useful. Edited by Emily Butler. Whitechapel Gallery, London.
- 2019. The Architecture of Life: Environments, Sculptures, Paintings, Drawings and Films. Edited by Iwona Blazwick. Texts by Iwona Blazwick, Carlos Bunga, Nuno Faria, Inês Grosso and Antony Hudek. Ediciones Polígrafa, Barcelona.
- 2014. Carlos Bunga. Texts by Adam Budak, João Fernandes, Marta Jecu, Ricardo Nicolau and María Inés Rodrígues. Serralves, Berlin.
- 2013. Carlos Bunga. Texts by Cecilia Delgado Masse, Alejandra Labastida. MUAC-UNAM, Mexico City.
- 2010. Carlos Bunga: A temporalidade do espaço. Texts by Cecilia Alemani, Filipa Oliveira, Nab Haq and Marta Jecu. Espaço Avenida, Lisbon.
- 2007. Carlos Bunga. Milton Keynes Project. Edited by Emma Dean, and Michael Stanley. Milton Keynes Gallery, Milton Keynes.
