= Roberto Carlos (footballer, born 1982) =

Spanish footballer

Personal information
- Full name: Roberto Carlos García Hernández
- Date of birth: 31 August 1982 (age 44)
- Place of birth: Santa Cruz de Tenerife, Spain
- Height: 1.77 m (5 ft 10 in)
- Position: Left back

Youth career
- Tenerife

Senior career*
Years	Team	Apps	(Gls)
2001–2003	Tenerife B		
2003–2006	Tenerife	46	(0)
2004–2005	→ Málaga B (loan)	26	(1)
2006–2007	Málaga B	33	(1)
2007–2008	Vecindario	17	(0)
2008–2009	Gramenet	42	(0)
2009–2010	Cultural Leonesa	19	(0)
2010–2013	Atlético Granadilla		
2013–2014	Marino		
2014–2015	Atlético Granadilla		
- * Club domestic league appearances and goals

Roberto Carlos García Hernández (born 31 August 1982 in Santa Cruz de Tenerife, Canary Islands), known as Roberto Carlos, is a Spanish retired footballer who played as a left back.
