= Carles Quilmetas =

Spanish composer

Carles Quilmetas (1775–1834) was a Spanish composer, violinist, and double-bassist long active in Girona.

Quilmetas was born in Vic, and worked for more than forty years at Girona Cathedral, where he was the first layman to take a permanent position as a musician. Almost nothing else of his biography is known, save that he was the first in a line of musicians known to have been active through the 19th century. He is also known to have suffered various hardships during his time in Girona, most related to the Napoleonic invasions of Spain. He wrote a symphony whose manuscript is currently held in the Library of Catalonia; it shows the influence of Joseph Haydn in some of its features. Whether or not the piece was ever performed during the composer's lifetime is unknown; it has been recorded on a disc with works by Rafael Cuenta.
