= Carlo =

Carlo may refer to:

- Carlo (name), a masculine given name and a surname
- Monte Carlo
- Carlingford, New South Wales, a suburb in north-west Sydney, New South Wales, Australia
- A satirical song written by Dafydd Iwan about Prince Charles
- A former member of Dion and the Belmonts best known for his 1964 song, Ring A Ling
- Carlo (submachine gun), an improvised West Bank gun
- Carlo, a fictional character from Animal Crossing: Pocket Camp

== See also ==
- Carl (name)
- Carle (disambiguation)
- Carlos (given name)
