= Carlos Mateus =

East Timorese footballer

Personal information
- Full name: Carlos Mateus Ximenes
- Date of birth: 6 January 1986 (age 40)
- Place of birth: Baucau, Timor-Leste
- Height: 1.69 m (5 ft 6 1/2 in)
- Positions: Defender; midfielder

Team information
- Current team: Vemasse Python

Senior career*
Years	Team	Apps	(Gls)
2010–	Baucau		

International career^{‡}
2010–	Timor-Leste	4	(0)
- * Club domestic league appearances and goals ‡ National team caps and goals as of 29 March 2016

Carlos Mateus Ximenes (born January 6, 1986) is an East Timorese footballer who plays as midfielder for Vemasse Python and the Timor-Leste national team.
