= Carlos Cisneros (Argentine politician) =

Argentine politician

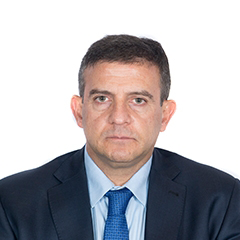

Member of the Chamber of Deputies of Argentina
- Incumbent
- Assumed office 10 December 2019

Personal details
- Born: July 21, 1962 (age 63)
- Party: Frentes de Todos

Carlos Cisneros is an Argentine politician who is a member of the Chamber of Deputies of Argentina.

== Biography ==
He worked in a bank before he was elected in 2019.
