= Betty Careless =

English prostitute and brothel owner

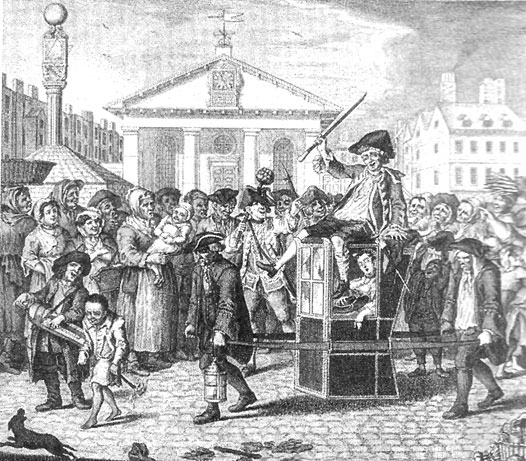
The sleeping Betty is carried home in a sedan chair after a night of revelling in Boitard's 1739 The Covent Garden Morning Frolick.

Betty Careless or Betsy Careless (c. 1704–1739, or potentially d. 1752) was a notorious English prostitute and bagnio-owner. Probably born Elizabeth Carless (though she later used the name Mrs. Elizabeth Biddulph), she adapted her name to better suit her profession. Her name, beauty and reputation made her, like Sally Salisbury before her, something of an archetypal courtesan for the popular culture of the day.

== Biography ==
She was born around 1704 in London. Nothing is known of her early life, but she was an established courtesan by the 1720s. Initially under the protection of the barrister Robert Henley, later Lord Chancellor, by 1729 when she opened her own house in Tavistock Row she was attached to Sir Charles Wyndham, later Earl of Egremont. Wyndham and Careless probably had a mutually beneficial relationship; he lived for free while his society connections ensured a higher-class clientele for Careless's house.

In Amelia, Henry Fielding recalled seeing her at a play when she was a young girl. Though, he said, "it was impossible to conceive a greater Appearance of Modesty, Innocence and Simplicity", her beauty disguised her true character. He had seen her a few days before "in bed with a Rake, at a bagnio, smoking Tobacco, drinking Punch, talking obscenity and swearing and cursing with all the Impudence and Impiety of the lowest and most abandoned Trull of a Soldier".

Some idea of her reputation can be divined from the graffiti "Prayer" attributed to her in the Bog-House Miscellany (ca. 1731): "Grant us good lusty Men, ye gracious Pow'rs! Or else stop up those craving Things of ours!", and her inclusion in one of Joe Miller's Jests in which an admirer compliments her on the perfection of her legs and says they are so alike that they "must be twins", to which Betty replies, "Oh no sir, for I have had more than one or two in between them".

In the early 1730s she reached the peak of her professional career, and she moved to a house in the Little Piazza in Covent Garden to try her hand as a bawd.

She takes centre-stage in Louis Peter Boitard's 1739 picture The Covent Garden Morning Frolick, in which she is being chauffeured home in a sedan chair after a night on the town with Captain "Mad Jack" Montague, who rides on the top of the sedan chair, and a motley assortment of her companions, including her personal link-boy, Little Casey.

In William Hogarth's A Rake's Progress her name is carved on the steps by an inmate in the final scene. According to the notes in the Anecdotes of William Hogarth, this man is William Ellis who was supposed to have been driven mad by his love for Betty.

In his essay on Dr Johnson, Thomas Babington Macaulay portrays her as the archetypal courtesan, characterising the life of those of "literary character" as precarious, fortunate to be "sometimes drinking champagne and tokay with Betty Careless". Careless, alongside many of the other notorious bawds of the early 18th century, may have inspired Mrs Cole in John Cleland's Fanny Hill.

By early 1735 she had given up her house in Covent Garden, with Jane Douglas taking it over. She was drinking heavily and could not duplicate the success she had enjoyed as a prostitute when she attempted to run a brothel. She announced that she would be opening a "Coffee House" in Prujean's Court at the Old Bailey, but she acknowledged that the place was ill-situated for her business, and in her advertisement practically begged her customers to continue to visit her.

In October 1739, The Gentleman's Magazine announced that she had been buried from the poor house. Much later, Fielding recorded her epitaph in The Covent Garden Journal:

On Wednesday Evening last [April 22d]

was buried from the Parish-House of Covent-
Garden, Mrs. Careless, well known for many
Years by the Name of Betty Careless by the gay
Gentlemen of the Town, of whose Money she
had been the Occasion (as it is said) of spending
upward of fifty thousand Pounds, tho' at last
reduced to receive Alms from the Parish. Almost
a certain Consequence attending Ladies in her

unhappy Cast of Life.
