= Carles Congost =

Catalan visual artist (born 1970)

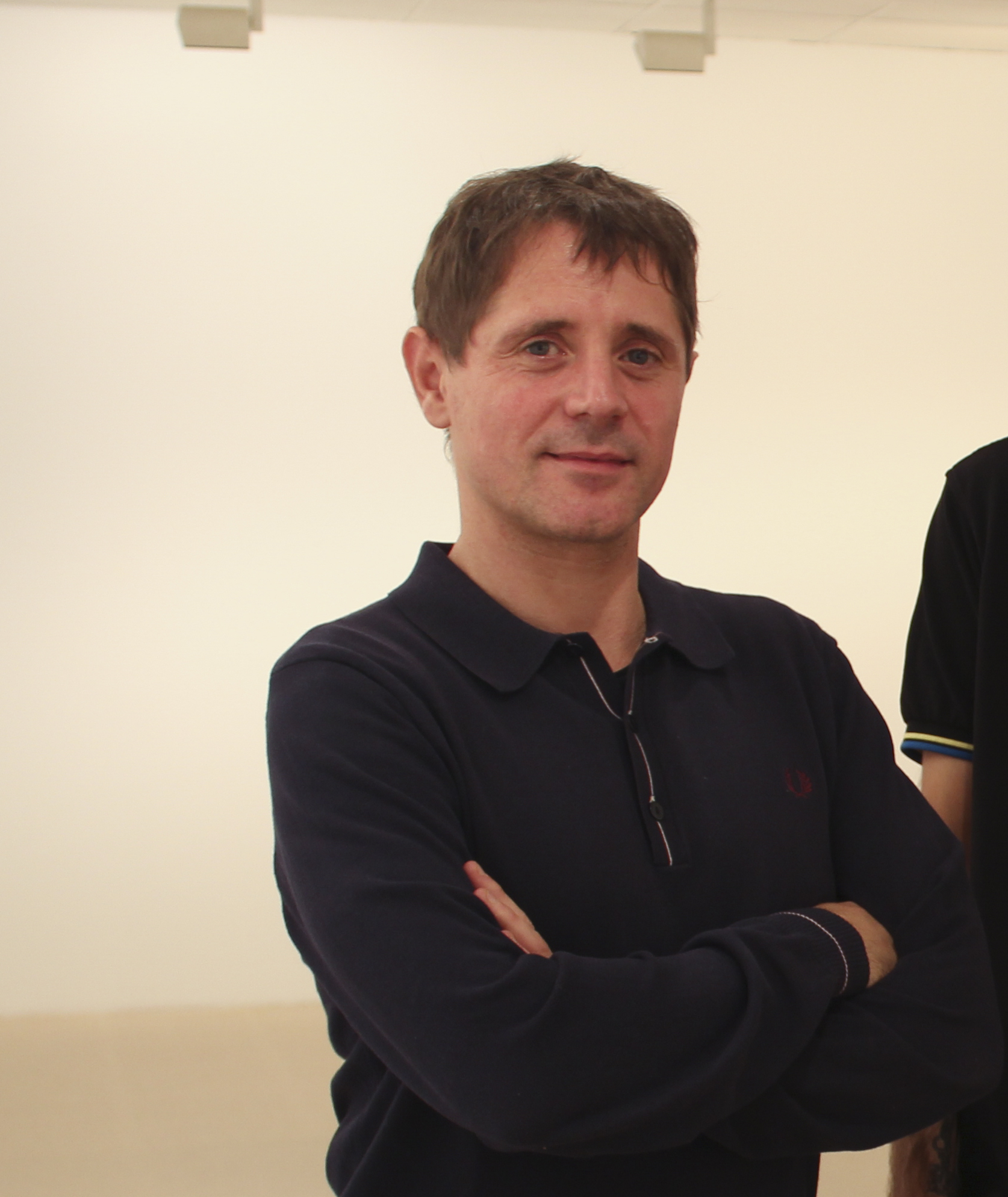
Image of Carles Congost

Carles Congost (born 1970 in Olot) is a Catalan visual artist. With a degree in arts by the University of Barcelona, he has done many solo exhibits in Spain. In his pieces uses various visual and audio procedures such as video, photography, drawing and sculpture. His work has been associated with the so-called club culture that is characterized by an aesthetic inspired by the world of fashion, music, advertising, video and photography. His works are stories that evoke ironic and sensual teenager universe. He is considered to be descendants of the best Catalan tradition of conceptual art in the field of video creation.
