= Carlo (name) =

Carlo is an Italian, Dutch and Spanish masculine given name and a surname. As an Italian name it is a short form of Charles. As a Spanish name it is a short form of Carlos. Notable people with this name include the following:

== Given name ==
- Carlo Acutis (1991–2006), Italian canonized teenager
- Carlo Agostini (1888–1952), Italian prelate
- Carlo Agostoni (1909–1972), Italian fencer
- Carlo Amoretti (1741–1816), Italian explorer and scientist
- Carlo Ancelotti (born 1959), Italian football player and manager
- Carlo Aquino (born 1985), Filipino actor and musician
- Carlo Arnaudi (1899–1970), Italian scientist and politician
- Carlo Bagno (1920–1990), Italian actor
- Carlo Bellini (1735–1804), Italian–American secretary and educator
- Carlo Bernini (1936–2011), Italian politician and businessman
- Carlo Biado (born 1983), Filipino pool player
- Carlo Alberto Biggini (1902–1945), Italian politician
- Carlo Bomans (born 1963), Belgian cyclist
- Carlo Bonomi (1937–2022), Italian voice actor
- Carlo Ludovico Bragaglia (1894–1998), Italian film director
- Carlo Buccirosso (born 1954), Italian actor, theatre director and playwright
- Carlo Buonaparte (1746–1785), Italian diplomat and father of Napoleon
- Carlo Cafiero (1846–1892), Italian anarchist
- Carlo Canna (born 1992), Italian rugby player
- Carlo J. Caparas (born 1958), Filipino comic strip creator/writer, director and producer
- Carlo Carcano (1891–1965), Italian football player and manager
- Carlo Carrà (1881–1966), Italian painter
- Carlo Cassola (1917–1987), Italian novelist and essayist
- Carlo Cattaneo (1801–1869), Italian philosopher, writer, and rebel
- Carlo Cecchi (1939–2026), Italian actor and theater director
- Carlo Ceresoli (1910–1995), Italian footballer
- Carlo Checchinato (born 1970), Italian rugby player
- Carlo Chendi (1933–2021), Italian cartoonist
- Carlo Azeglio Ciampi (1920–2016), Italian politician
- Carlo Chiti (1924–1994), Italian automotive engineer
- Carlo Cignani (1628–1719), Italian painter
- Carlo M. Cipolla (1922–2000), Italian historian
- Carlo Clerici (1929–2007), Swiss cyclist
- Carlo Collodi (1826–1890), Italian author, humourist, and journalist
- Carlo Contarini (1580–1656), Italian nobleman
- Carlo Conti (born 1961), Italian television personality
- Carlo Costamagna (1881–1965), Italian lawyer and academic
- Carlo Costly (born 1982), Honduran football player
- Carlo Crivelli (c. 1430 – 1495), Italian Renaissance painter
- Carlo Croccolo (1927–2019), Italian actor, voice actor, director and screenwriter
- Carlo Cudicini (born 1973), Italian footballer
- Carlo Alberto dalla Chiesa (1920–1982), Italian general
- Carlo Delle Piane (1936–2019), Italian film actor
- Carlo Dolci (1616–1686), Italian painter
- Carlo Donat-Cattin (1919–1991) was an Italian politician
- Carlo Emery (1848–1925), Italian entomologist
- Carlo von Dardel (1880–1955), Swedish diplomat
- Carlo D'Este (1936–2020), American historian
- Carlo Evertz (born 1990), Belgian footballer
- Carlo Fassi (1929–1997), Italian figure skater and coach
- Carlo Del Fava (born 1981), South African-born Italian rugby player
- Carlo Festuccia (born 1980), Italian rugby player
- Carlo Fontana (1634 or 1638–1714), Italian architect
- Carlo Emilio Gadda (1893–1973), Italian writer and poet
- Carlo Gaddi (born 1962), Italian rower
- Carlo Gaetano Gaisruck (1769–1846), Austrian Cardinal
- Carlo Galetti (1882–1949), Italian road racing cyclist
- Carlo Gambino (1902–1976), Italian mobster
- Carlo Gatti (1817–1878), Swiss entrepreneur
- Carlo Geloso (1879–1957), was an Italian general
- Carlo Gesualdo (1566–1613), Italian Prince
- Carlo Ginzburg (1939–2026), Italian historian
- Carlo Giuffrè (1928–2018), Italian actor and director
- Carlo Maria Giulini (1914–2005), Italian conductor
- Carlo Goldoni (1707–1793), Italian playwright and librettist
- Carlo Gozzi (1720–1806), Italian playwright
- Carlo Grande (born 1974), Italian rower
- Carlo Grippo (born 1955), Italian middle-distance athlete
- Carlo Janka (born 1986), Swiss skier
- Carlo Katigbak (born 1970), Filipino executive
- Carlo Lastimosa (born 1990), Filipino basketball player
- Carlo Levi (1902–1975), Italian painter, writer
- Carlo Lievore (1937–2002), Italian javelin athlete
- Carlo Lizzani (1922–2013), Italian film director, screenwriter and critic
- Carlo Maderno (1556–1629), Italian architect
- Carlo Magri (c. 1617 – 1693), Maltese priest, scholar, and dramatist
- Carlo Maratta (1625–1713), Italian painter
- Carlo Maria Martini (1927–2012), Italian Jesuit and cardinal of the Catholic Church
- Carlo Marino (born 1968), Italian politician
- Carlo Marochetti (1805–1867), Italian-born French sculptor
- Carlo Marrale (born 1952), Italian singer, songwriter and musician
- Carlo Martinenghi (1894–1944), Italian long-distance athlete
- Carlo Masci (born 1958), Italian politician
- Carlo Matteucci (1811–1868), Italian physicist and neurophysiologist
- Carlo Mattioli (born 1954), Italian race walker
- Carlo Mattogno (born 1951), Italian writer
- Carlo Mazzacurati (1956–2014), Italian film director and screenwriter
- Carlo Mazzone (born 1937), Italian football player and manager
- Carlo de' Medici (1595–1666), Italian Cardinal
- Carlo Monti (1920–2016), Italian sprint athlete
- Carlo Montuori (1885–1968), Italian cinematographer
- Carlo Mornati (born 1972), Italian rower
- Carlo Nicoli (1843–1915), Italian sculptor
- Carlo Ninchi (1896–1974), Italian actor
- Carlo Oriani (1888–1917), Italian cyclist
- Carlo Paalam (born 1998), Filipino boxer
- Carlo Parola (1921–2000), Italian football player and coach
- Carlo Pedersoli (1929–2016), Italian swimmer and actor (Bud Spencer)
- Carlo Pellegrini (1839–1889), Italian artist
- Carlo Petrini (1949–2026), Italian activist and founder of the international Slow Food movement
- Carlo Petrini (scientist) (born 1965), Italian scientist and bio-ethicist
- Carlo Petrini (footballer) (1948–2012), Italian football player and coach
- Carlo Pietzner (1915–1986), American artist and anthroposophist
- Carlo Pinsoglio (born 1990), Italian footballer
- Carlo Pisacane (1818–1857), Italian patriot
- Carlo Ponti (1912–2007), Italian film producer
- Carlo Alberto Quario (1913–1984), Italian football player and coach
- Carlo Rambaldi (1925–2012), Italian special effects artist
- Carlo Recalcati (born 1945), Italian basketball coach and player
- Carlo Rigotti (1906–1983), Italian football player
- Carlo Felice Nicolis, conte di Robilant (1826–1888), Italian statesman and diplomat
- Carlo Rolandi (1926–2020), Italian sailor
- Carlo Romano (1908–1975), Italian actor, voice actor and screenwriter
- Carlo Rosselli (1899–1937), Italian Jewish political leader
- Carlo Rossi (architect) (1775–1849), Italian architect
- Carlo Rota (born 1961), British actor
- Carlo Rovelli (born 1956), Italian physicist
- Carlo Rubbia (born 1934), Italian physicist
- Carlo Rustichelli (1916–2004), Italian film composer
- Carlo Ruzzini (1653–1735), Italian diplomat
- Carlo Saraceni (1579–1620), Italian painter
- Carlo Salvemini (born 1966), Italian politician
- Carlo Santi (born 1974), Italian Formula One engineer
- Carlo Savina (1919–2002), Italian composer and conductor
- Carlo Scarascia-Mugnozza (1920–2004), Italian politician
- Carlo Scarpa (1906–1978), Italian architect
- Carlo Schanzer (1865–1953), Italian jurist and politician
- Carlo Scognamiglio (born 1944), Italian economist and politician
- Carlo Sforza (1872–1952), Italian politician
- Carlo Sibilia (born 1986), Italian politician
- Carlo De Simone (1885–1951), Italian Army officer
- Carlo Simionato (born 1961), Italian sprint athlete
- Carlo Luigi Spegazzini (1858–1926), Italian-born Argentinian botanist and mycologist
- Carlo Speroni (1895–1969), Italian long-distance athlete
- Carlo Gaetano Stampa (1667–1742), Italian Cardinal and Archbishop
- Carlo Tamberlani (1899–1980), Italian actor
- Carlo Thränhardt (born 1957), German high jumper
- Carlo von Tiedemann (1943–2025), German television presenter
- Carlo I Tocco (died 1429), Italian Count and Despot
- Carlo Tognoli (1938–2021), Italian politician
- Carlo Trigilia (born 1951), Italian academic and politician
- Carlo Ubbiali (1929–2020), Italian motorcycle racer
- Carlo van Dam (born 1986), Dutch racing driver
- Carlo Vanzina (1951–2018), Italian film director, producer and screenwriter
- Carlo Verdone (born 1950), Italian actor, screenwriter and film director
- Carlo Vergara (born 1971), Filipino graphic designer and illustrator
- Carlo Maria Viganò (born 1941), Italian Catholic archbishop
- Carlo Villani (footballer, born 1970), Australian former soccer player and coach
- Carlo Vittori (1931–2015), Italian sprinter and athletics coach
- Carlo, Duke of Calabria (1775–1778), heir to Naples and Sicily
- Prince Carlo, Duke of Castro (born 1963), French-born Italian nobleman

== Nickname/stage name ==
- Carlo Collodi, pen name of Carlo Lorenzini (1826–1890), Italian author known for The Adventures of Pinocchio
- Carlo Corazzin, nickname of Giancarlo Michele Corazzin (born 1971), Canadian football player
- Carlo Little, stage name of Carl O'Neil Little (1938–2005), British drummer
- Carlo Montagnese, real name of Illangelo (born 1987), Canadian musician

== Middle name ==
- Andrea Carlo Ferrari (1850–1921), Italian Roman Catholic prelate
- Bartolomeo Carlo Romilli (1795–1859), Italian Archbishop
- Ferdinando Carlo Gonzaga, Duke of Mantua and Montferrat (1652–1708), Italian nobility
- Gian Carlo Muzzarelli (born 1955), Italian politician
- Gian-Carlo Rota (1932–1999), Italian mathematician
- Luigi Carlo Farini (1812–1866), Italian statesman

== Surname ==
- Brandon Carlo (born 1996), American ice hockey player
- Monti Carlo (born 1975), Puerto Rican host, chef and blogger
- Philip Carlo (1949–2010), American journalist and author
- Phoebe Carlo (1874–1898), British actress

== Fictional characters ==
- Carlo Hesser, character from One Life to Live
- Carlo Gervasi, character from The Sopranos
- Carlo Renzi, character from The Sopranos
- Carlo Rizzi character in Mario Puzo's novel The Godfather
- Carlo Zota, character from Marvel Comics
- Don Carlo, Baritone in Verdi opera, Ernani

== See also ==
- Carbo (disambiguation)
- Cardo (disambiguation)
- Cargo (disambiguation)
- Carmo (disambiguation)
- Carl (name)
- Carla
- Carle, surnames
- Carle (given name)
- Carli (given name)
- Carli (surname)
- Carlon
- Carlos (given name)
- Carlos (surname)
- Carlow (disambiguation)
- Carly
- Calò (surname)
- Caló (surname)
- Caro (surname)
- Carol (given name)
- Carro (surname)
- De Carlo
- DeCarlo
- Di Carlo
- DiCarlo
- Karlo (name)
