= Cardo (disambiguation) =

A cardo is a north–south-oriented street in ancient Roman city planning.

Cardo may also refer to:

== People ==
- Cardo (name)
- Cardo (record producer) (born 1984), American producer and rapper

== Places ==
- Cardo (Gozón), a civil parish in Asturias, Spain
- Cardo-Torgia, a commune in the Corse-du-Sud department of France
- The Cardo (Jerusalem), Israel

== Other uses ==
- In arthropods, a basal sclerite of an insect's maxilla
- In molluscs, the hinge region of a bivalve shell
- Cardo (TV series), Spanish TV series
- Carbazole 1,9a-dioxygenase, an enzyme
- Cardo polymer
- Cardo, a Bembo-like open-source font
- A goat cheese produced by Mary Holbrook
- Cardo Dalisay, protagonist of Philippine TV series Ang Probinsyano, portrayed by Coco Martin

== See also ==
- Carlo (name)
- Kardo (disambiguation)
