= Mundet =

Mundet may refer to:

- Agustí Garriga i Mundet, mayor of the Spanish and Catalan city of Girona in 1891
- Artur Mundet i Carbó, a Catalan-Mexican entrepreneur and philanthropist
- CV AA Llars Mundet, a volleyball team in the Spanish and Catalan city of Barcelona
- Jeroni Granell i Mundet, a Catalan architect and road planner
- Mundet metro station, in the Spanish and Catalan city of Barcelona
- Parque Arturo Mundet, a park in Mexico City
- Prisco Mundet, a form of cream soda from Mexico
- Recinte Mundet, an area of the Spanish and Catalan city of Barcelona that now houses a campus of the University of Barcelona
- Sidral Mundet, an apple-flavored carbonated soft drink from Mexico
