= Carbo =

Carbo or accented Carbó may refer to

== Places ==
- Carbó Municipality, a municipality in Sonora, Mexico
  - Carbó, the municipal seat of Carbó Municipality, Sonora, Mexico
- Enrique Carbó, Argentina, a village and municipality in Entre Ríos Province, Argentina
- Pedro Carbo Canton, a canton in Guayas Province, Ecuador
  - Pedro Carbo, the municipal seat of Pedro Carbo Canton

== People ==
=== In Ancient Rome ===
- Papirius Carbo, an ancient Roman family
  - Gaius Papirius Carbo (consul 120 BC)
  - Gnaeus Papirius Carbo (consul 113 BC)
  - Gnaeus Papirius Carbo (consul 85 BC)
  - Gaius Papirius Carbo Arvina

=== Contemporary ===
- Agustín Carbó, Puerto Rican energy and environmental attorney
- Bernie Carbo (born 1947), American Major League baseball player
- Chuck Carbo (1926–2008), American R&B singer
- Frankie Carbo (1904–1976), New York City Mafia soldier in the Lucchese crime family
- José Carbó, Argentine-Australian operatic baritone
- Juan José Carbó (1927–2010), Spanish cartoonist
- Nick Carbó (1964–2024), Filipino-American writer
- Nick DeCarbo (1910–1991), American football player
- Raúl Baca Carbo (1931–2014), Ecuadorian engineer and politician
- Toni Carbo, American information scientist
- Victoria Carbó (born 1963), Argentine field hockey player
- Willy Carbo (born 1959), Dutch football player

=== i Carbo ===
- Artur Mundet i Carbó (1879–1965), Catalan businessman based in Mexico
- Quima Jaume i Carbó (1934–1993), Catalan Spanish poet
- Ramon Casas i Carbó (1866–1932), Catalan Spanish artist

== See also ==
- Calbo (disambiguation)
- Carlo (name)
