= Cargo (disambiguation) =

Cargo is transported goods or produce.

Cargo may also refer to:

== Places ==
- Cargo, New South Wales, in Cabonne Shire, Australia
- Cargo, Cumbria, a village near Carlisle, England
- Cargo Pond, Alatna Valley, in the Convoy Range of Victoria Land, Antarctica

== People ==
- Bobby Cargo (1868–1904), American baseball player
- David Cargo (1929–2013), American lawyer and politician
- Carlos González (baseball), a baseball player nicknamed CarGo

== Films ==
- Cargo (1990 film), Canadian drama film
- Cargo (2006 film), a film directed by Clive Gordon
- Cargo (2009 film), a Swiss science fiction film directed by Ivan Engler
- Cargo (2013 film), an Australian short film about a zombie apocalypse
- Cargo (2017 film), an Australian feature-length remake of the 2013 film
- CarGo, a 2017 American animated film by The Asylum
- Cargo (2018 film), an American horror thriller film
- Cargo (2019 film), an Indian Hindi-language science fiction film

== Music ==
- Cargo (album), 1983 album by the Australian pop rock band Men at Work
- Cargo (band), a Romanian heavy metal band
- Cargo Records (disambiguation)

== Other uses ==
- Cargo (retail chain), a defunct British homewares retail chain
- Cargo (software), the build system and package manager of the Rust programming language
- Cargo! The Quest for Gravity, a video game
- Cargo (game), a board game
- Cargo, any office held in the cargo system of parts of rural Mexico and Central America
- Rahti, a 2021 Finnish TV series also known as Cargo

== See also ==
- Cargoe
- Kargo
- Kargow
- Kargów
- Cargo cult (disambiguation)
