= Carmo =

Carmo may refer to:

- The Order of the Carmelites in Portuguese-speaking countries

== Places ==
=== Brazil toponymy ===
- Carmo, a municipality in Rio de Janeiro
- Carmo da Cachoeira, municipality in Minas Gerais
- Carmo de Minas, municipality in Minas Gerais
- Carmo do Cajuru, municipality in Minas Gerais
- Carmo do Paranaíba, municipality in Minas Gerais
- Carmo do Rio Claro, municipality in Minas Gerais
- Carmo da Mata, municipality in Minas Gerais
- Carmo do Rio Verde, municipality in Goiás
- Monte do Carmo, a municipality in Tocantins
- Do Carmo River, a river in Rio Grande do Norte state

=== Other countries ===
- Carmo, or Carmo District, in Puntland, Somalia
- Monte Carmo, a mountain in Northern Italy
- Monte Carmo di Loano, a mountain in Northern Italy
- Carmo, the Roman name of Carmona, Spain

=== Churches and convents ===
- Carmo Convent (Lisbon)
- Convent of Nossa Senhora do Carmo (Lagoa)
- Carmo Church (Braga)

== People ==
- Alberto do Carmo Neto
- Antônio do Carmo Cheuiche
- Carlos do Carmo
- Carmo de Souza
- Dalila Carmo
- Henrique Carmo
- Manuel Carmo
- Marcelo Luis de Almeida Carmo
- Maria do Carmo Seabra
- Maria do Carmo Silveira
- Matheus Henrique do Carmo Lopes
- Edmílson dos Santos Carmo Júnior
- Paulo Roberto do Carmo
- Pedro do Carmo
- Wanderson do Carmo
- Wermeson do Carmo
- Zé do Carmo (ceramist)
- Zé do Carmo (footballer)

== See also ==
- Carlo (name)
