= Calo =

Calo, Caló, or Calò may refer to:

== Language and culture ==
- Caló language, the language of the Iberian Romani
  - Iberian Kale (calé), a Romani subgroup
    - Romani people in Spain
    - Romani people in Portugal
- Caló (Chicano), argot or slang of Mexican-American Spanish

== People ==
- Calò (surname), an Italian surname
- Caló (surname), a Spanish and Portuguese surname
- Caló (footballer) (born 1976), Cape Verdean footballer
- Super Caló, Rafael García (born 1971), Mexican professional wrestler

== Other uses ==
- CALO, Cognitive Assistant that Learns and Organizes, a DARPA project
- Calo (Roman fort), a Roman army encampment of the Limes Germanicus

== See also ==
- Caloy
- Kalo (disambiguation)
