= Kalo =

Kalo or KALO may refer to:

- A member of certain subgroups of the Romani people of Western and Northern Europe (plural kale):
  - Calé
  - Kale (Welsh Roma)
  - Finnish Kale
- The dialects of the Romani language spoken by these groups:
  - Caló
  - Welsh Romani
  - Finnish Kalo
- The taro plant, known in Hawaii as kalo
- KALO, a television station serving Honolulu, Hawaii
- Waterloo Regional Airport, an airport serving Waterloo, Iowa
- Kalo, a town in Congo-Kinshasa

== People ==
- Bong Kalo (born 1997), Vanuatuan footballer
- Isuf Kalo (1942–2023), Albanian doctor, and professor of medicine
- Kali Kalo (born 1926), Greek actress
- Sándor Kaló (born 1945), Hungarian former handball player
- Shlomo Kalo (1928–2014), Israeli author and thinker, poet, composer and medical microbiologist
- Jack "Kalo" Kalloway, a fictitious cartoonist who is searched for in the graphic novel It's a Good Life, If You Don't Weaken

== See also ==
- Calo (disambiguation)
- Kale (disambiguation)
- Cale (disambiguation)
- Kaalo, a 2010 Indian horror film
- Names of the Romani people
- Romani populations
