= DeCaro =

DeCaro or Decaro may refer to:

== People ==
- Antonio Decaro (born 1970), Italian politician, current mayor of Bari
- Dante DeCaro (born 1981), former guitarist/songwriter of the Canadian band Hot Hot Heat
- Dru Decaro (Andrew Philip DeCaro, born 1983), American musician, singer/songwriter and producer
- Frank DeCaro (born 1962), American writer, performer and talk radio host
- John DeCaro (born 1982), American former professional ice hockey goaltender
- Matt DeCaro, American film and stage actor
- Pat DeCaro (artist) (born 1951), American artist

== Other uses ==
- 5329 Decaro, a minor planet discovered by R. H. McNaught on December 21, 1989 at Siding Spring Observatory
- Hills-DeCaro House, a 1906 remodel building by Frank Lloyd Wright in his Prairie style, located at Oak Park, Chicago

== See also ==
- DeCarlo
- De Caro (disambiguation)
