= Pietzner =

Pietzner is a surname that is mainly found in German-speaking countries. Notable people with the surname include:

- Carlo Pietzner (1915–1986), Austrian-born artist, anthroposophist, and co-founder of the Camphill Movement
- Christine Pietzner (born 1949), New Zealand netball player
