= Kardo =

Kardo may refer to:

- Kardo Bestilo (born 1976), Angolan writer
- Kardo Ploomipuu (born 1988), Estonian swimmer
- Cordău, village in Sânmartin Commune, Bihor County, Romania

== See also ==
- Cardo (disambiguation)
- Kardos (surname)
