= Calor =

Calor may refer to:

== Science ==
- Heat (Latin: calor), in thermodynamics, or the human perception of:
  - Thermal energy, in physics and engineering
  - Temperature, the manifestation of thermal energy
- Heat (Latin: calor), one of the cardinal signs of inflammation in medicine

== Other uses ==
- Calor River (disambiguation)
  - Calore Irpino (or Calore Beneventano), a tributary of the Volturno
  - Calore Lucano (or Calore Salernitano), a tributary of the Sele
- Calor Gas, a brand of bottled propane and butane gas
- Calor (album), a 1992 album by Julio Iglesias

== See also ==
- * Calorie, a unit of energy
- Caloric theory, an obsolete scientific theory
- Caloric reflex test, a test of the vestibulo-ocular reflex
- Caloric (brand), a brand of kitchen appliances
- Calorimetry, thermodynamic state measurement
- Caloy
- Heat (disambiguation)
