= De Carle =

De Carle or de Carle is a surname. Notable people with this name include:

- Lancelot de Carle (c. 1508–1568), French scholar, poet and diplomat
- Nichole de Carle (born 1984), British fashion designer

== See also ==
- Carle, surnames
- Carle (given name)
- de Carli
- De Carlo
