= Riccardo Adami =

Italian engineer

Personal information
- Born: 27 November 1973 (age 52) Brescia, Lombardy, Italy
- Education: Chassis area University of Brescia
- Occupation: Engineer
- Years active: 2002–present

Sport
- Sport: Formula One
- Position: Race engineer
- Team: Scuderia Ferrari

Riccardo Adami (born 27 November 1973) is an Italian engineer working for Scuderia Ferrari. He is the manager of the Ferrari Driver Academy and Ferrari's Testing of Previous Cars program. Prior to this, he was the race engineer of Sebastian Vettel, Carlos Sainz Jr. and Lewis Hamilton.

== Career ==
Adami obtained a diploma in chassis area at the University of Brescia in 2001 and worked for Minardi since 2002. He worked in several positions throughout the years before ultimately being promoted as the race engineer in 2005. Adami remained with the team after the team was acquired by the Austrian energy drink maker Red Bull GmbH and renamed as Scuderia Toro Rosso at the end of 2005. In his time at Minardi and Toro Rosso, he was the race engineer to several drivers, including Vitantonio Liuzzi, Sebastian Vettel, Sébastien Buemi and Daniel Ricciardo.

In 2015, Adami left Toro Rosso and moved to Scuderia Ferrari, working as Vettel's race engineer once again. Adami was the race engineer for Carlos Sainz Jr. from 2021 until the driver's departure to Williams at the end of 2024. Adami became the race engineer for seven-time world champion Lewis Hamilton, who joined the team for the 2025 season. His relationship with Hamilton received scrutiny throughout the season. In 2026, Adami was replaced by Carlo Santi as Hamilton's race engineer and was reassigned as the manager of the Ferrari Driver Academy and Ferrari's Testing of Previous Cars program.
