= Calon =

Calon may refer to:

- Château Calon-Ségur Bordeaux wine producer archaically named simply Calon
- Calon Lân, Welsh hymn

Media

- Calon (TV production company) A Welsh animation company formally Siriol Productions Ltd.
- Calon FM, British community radio station

People:

- Christian Calon (b. 1950), Canadian composer

In fiction:

- Calon Arang, mythological character from Javanese and Balinese folklore

== See also ==
- Caloy
