= Cardo (name) =

Cardo is a surname. Notable people with the name include:

- Dominic Cardo, American competitive eater
- Horacio Cardo (1944–2018), painter and illustrator from Argentina
- Manolo Cardo (1940–2025), Spanish football player
- Michael Cardo (born 1977), South African politician
- Pierre Cardo (born 1949), French politician
- Ron Cardo (born 1946), American football player and coach

== See also ==
- Cardo (record producer)
- Cardo (disambiguation)
