= Caloy =

Caloy is a nickname for Carlos in the Philippines. Notable people known by this name include the following:

- Caloy Balcells, nickname for Carlos Balcells (fl. 1985–present), Spanish Filipino bass guitar player
- Caloy Garcia, nickname for Carlos Jose Garcia (born 1975) Filipino professional basketball coach
- Caloy Loyzaga, nickname for Carlos Loyzaga (1930 – 2016). Filipino basketball player and coach
- Caloy, nickname for Carlos Yulo (born 2000). Filipino artistic gymnast and two time Olympic Gold Medalist

== See also ==
- Caló (surname)
- Calò (surname)
- Cally (disambiguation)
- Calo (disambiguation)
- Calon (disambiguation)
- Calor (disambiguation)
