= DeCarlo =

DeCarlo is an Italian surname. Notable people with the surname include:

- Angelo DeCarlo (1902–1973), American Mafioso
- Art DeCarlo (1931–2013), American football player
- Dan DeCarlo (1919–2001), American cartoonist
- Joe DeCarlo (died 1928), American bootlegger of the Dallas crime family
- Josie DeCarlo (1923–2012), French-born model and wife of Dan DeCarlo
- Mark DeCarlo (born 1962), American actor, television host and comedian
- Michael DeCarlo, Canadian television director
- Mike DeCarlo (born 1957), American comic book artist
- Tommy DeCarlo (1965–2026), American rock singer
- Tony DeCarlo (1940–2018), American football and wrestling coach

== See also ==
- Carlo (name)
- De Carlo
- DeCaro (disambiguation)
- DiCarlo
- Inga DeCarlo Fung Marchand, birthname of Foxy Brown (rapper)
- Thomas DeCarlo Callaway, birthname of CeeLo Green
