= DiCarlo =

DiCarlo or diCarlo is an Italian surname. Notable people with the surname include:

== Surname ==
- David C. DiCarlo (born 1945), American politician
- David F. Girard-diCarlo (born 1943), American diplomat
- Dominick L. DiCarlo (1928–1999), American lawyer and politician
- Gabi DiCarlo (born 1985), American stock car racing driver
- George DiCarlo (born 1963), American swimmer
- James DiCarlo, American neuroscientist
- Joseph DiCarlo (1936–2020), American politician
- Robert DiCarlo, American politician
- Rosemary DiCarlo (born 1947), American diplomat

== Middle name ==
- Veronica DiCarlo Wicker (1930 – 1994), American jurist

== See also ==
- Carlo (name)
- DeCarlo
- Di Carlo
