= Jarritos =

Brand of soft drink

Coordinates: 19°29′8.4″N 99°11′1.6″W

- Type: Citrus Soda
- Manufacturer: Novamex
- Origin: Mexico
- Introduced: 1950; 76 years ago
- Related products: Sangria Señorial; Ibarra (chocolate); Sidral Mundet; Jarritos Mineragua; Jarritos Kids
- Website: jarritos.com

Jarritos is a brand of soft drink in Mexico, owned by Novamex, a large independent bottling conglomerate based in El Paso, Texas. Jarritos was founded in 1950 by Don Francisco "El Güero" Hill.

Jarritos is made with fruit flavors and cane sugar, and is less carbonated than many popular soft drinks. Many Jarritos varieties are naturally flavored. The word jarrito means "little jug" in Spanish and refers to the Mexican tradition of storing drinks in clay pottery jugs. Produced in Mexico, they are sold throughout the Americas and Australia. Jarritos comes in 370 mL (12.5 US fl oz) and 600 mL (20 US fl oz) glass and plastic, as well as 1.5-liter bottles.

== History ==
The original Jarritos was a coffee-flavored drink, before it moved to fruit flavors. Shortly after launching the first Jarritos in Mexico City, Francisco Hill developed a process to remove tamarind juice extract to create the first tamarind-flavored soft drink in Mexico: Jarritos Tamarindo. Hill quickly followed with Mandarin, Lemon and Fruit Punch flavors, gaining greater market share. By 1960, Jarritos had secured distribution in 80 percent of Mexico’s 31 states.

Exports to the United States began in 1988. According to the 2009 edition of the book Mexico Greatest Brands, 6000 bottles of Jarritos are shipped across the border each minute. Jarritos is now present in 42 countries.

In May 2023, Jarritos and Nike collaborated to make a Jarritos-inspired Nike Dunk shoe.

== Flavors ==
Jarritos has been sold in 16 flavors:

- Fruit Punch
- Grapefruit
- Guava
- Jamaica (hibiscus tea)
- Lemon Lime
- Lime
- Mandarin
- Mango
- Apple
- Mexican Cola
- Passion Fruit
- Pineapple
- Strawberry
- Tamarind
- Watermelon
- Mandarin Zero

== Gallery ==
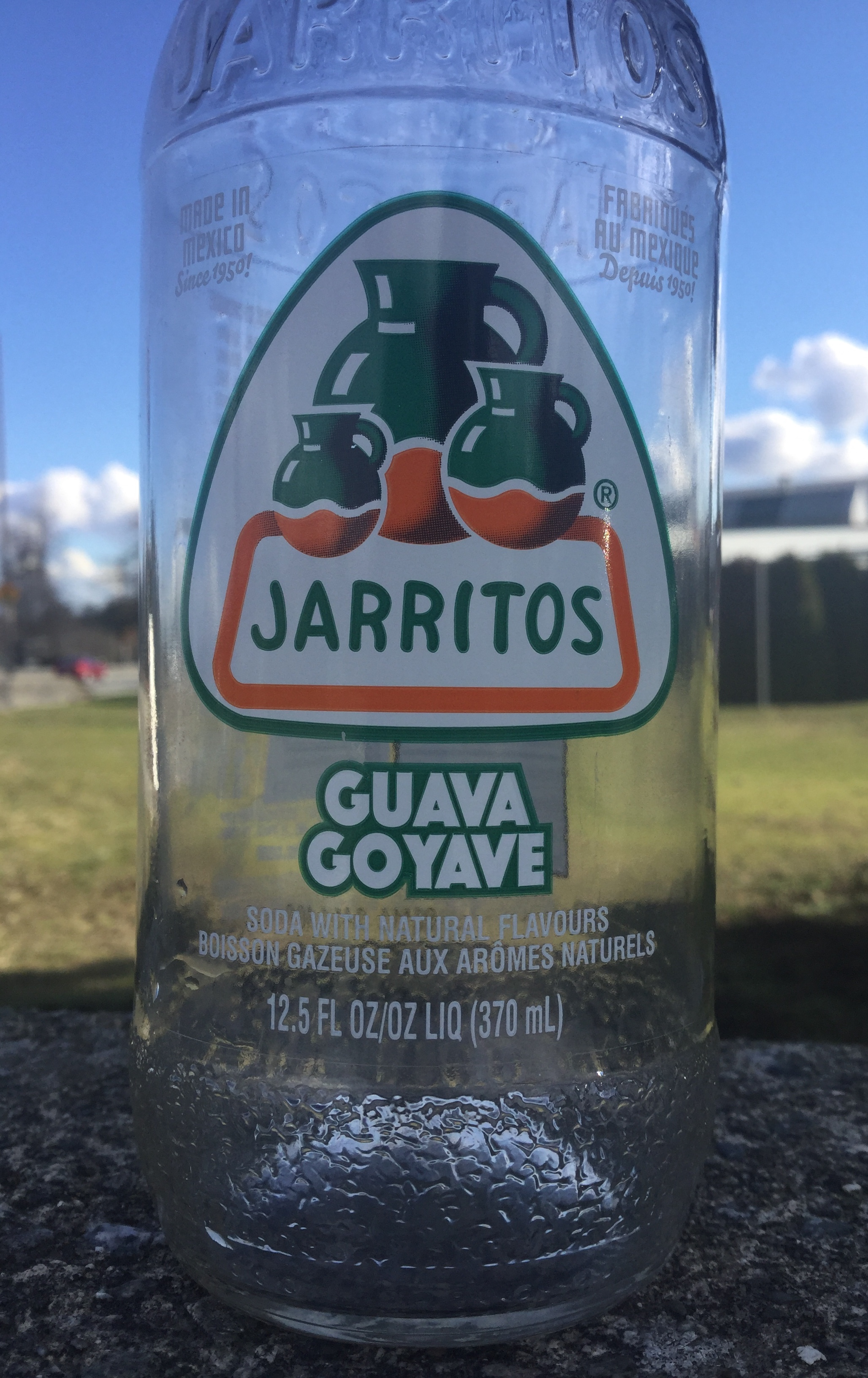
A Jarritos bottle sold in Canada

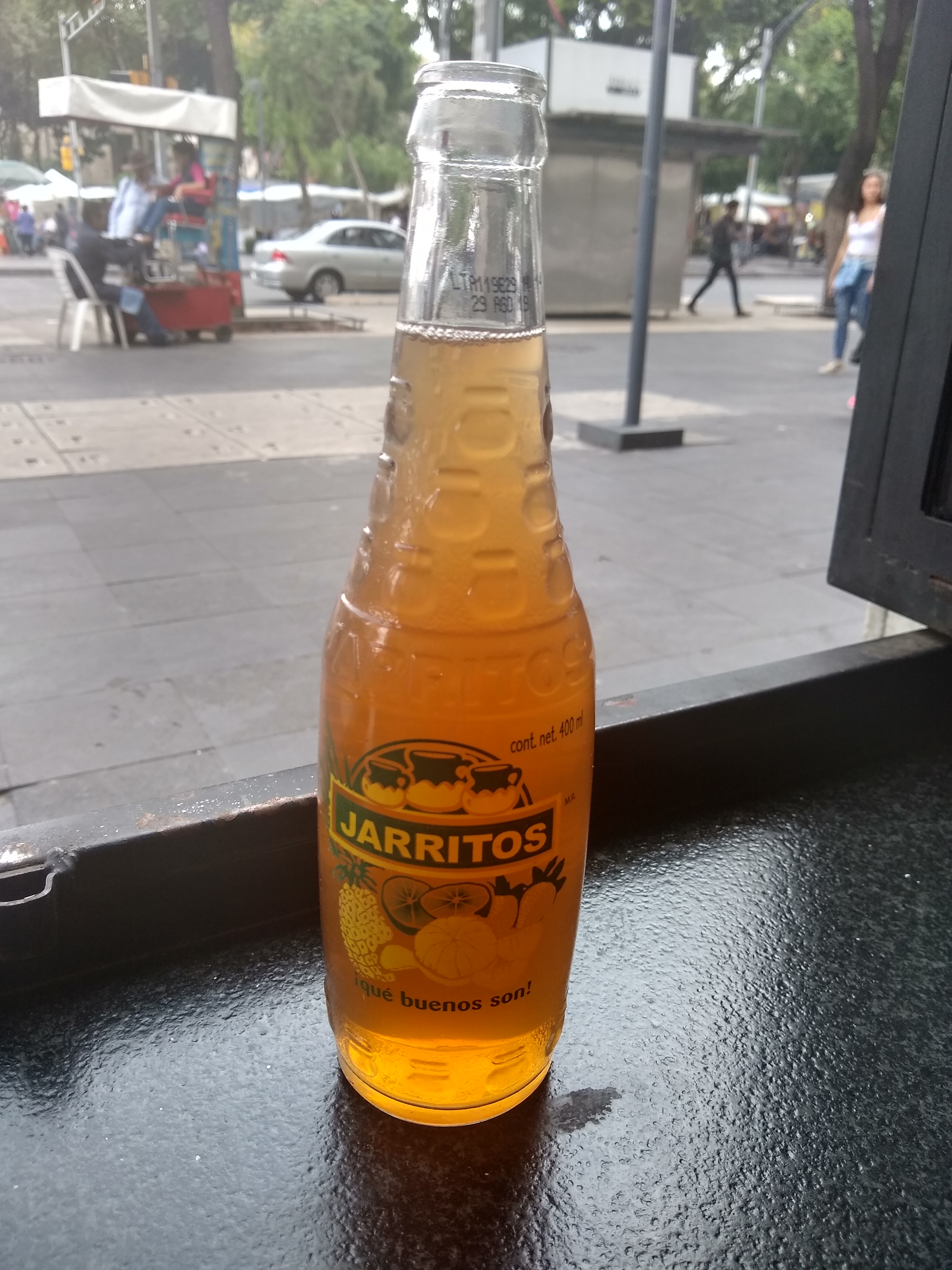
In Mexico, Jarritos uses a different bottle and logo design

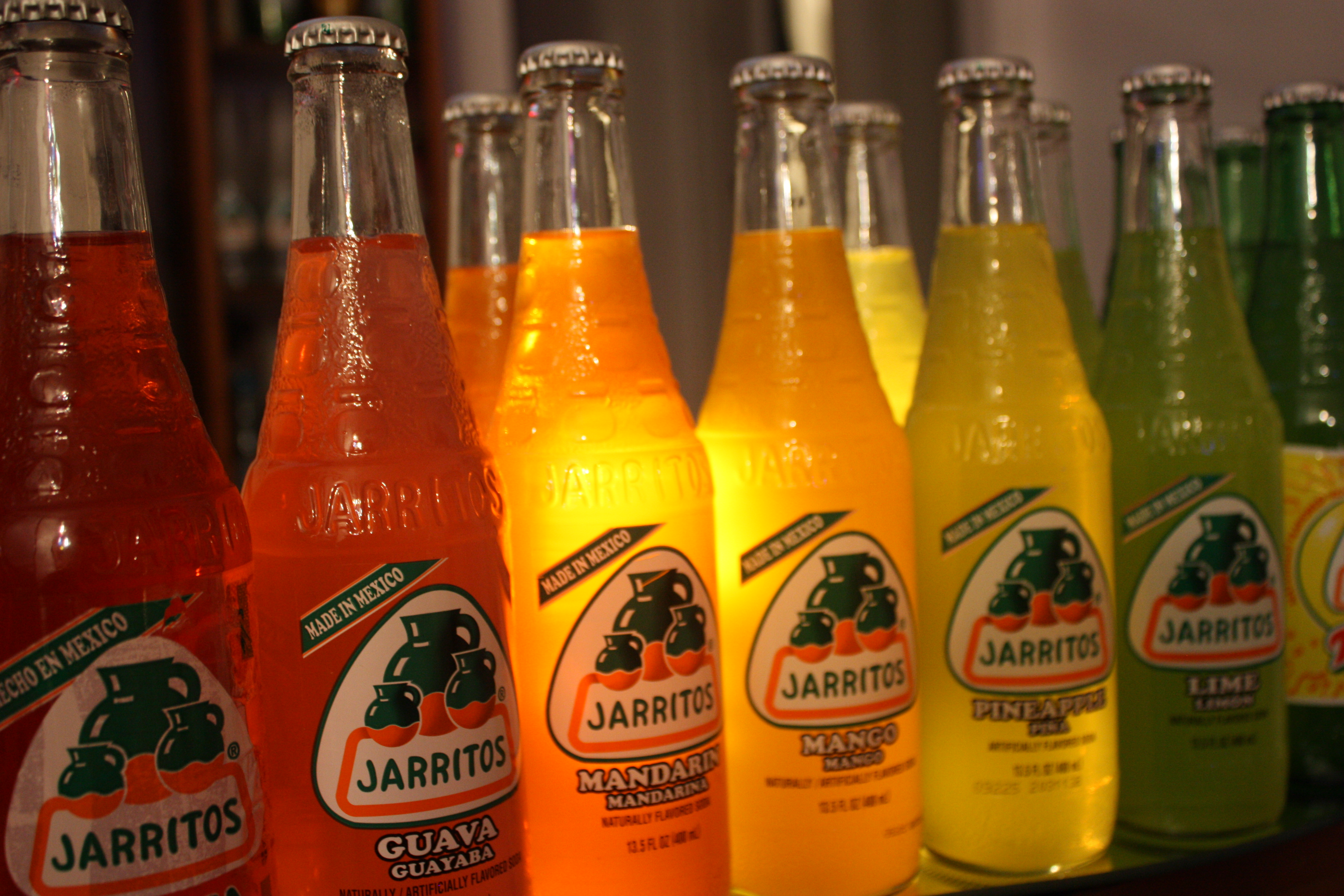
From left to right: Guava, Mandarin, Mango, Pineapple, Lime

== See also ==
- List of brand name soft drink products
- List of soft drink flavors
