= Marco Alessandrini =

Italian politician

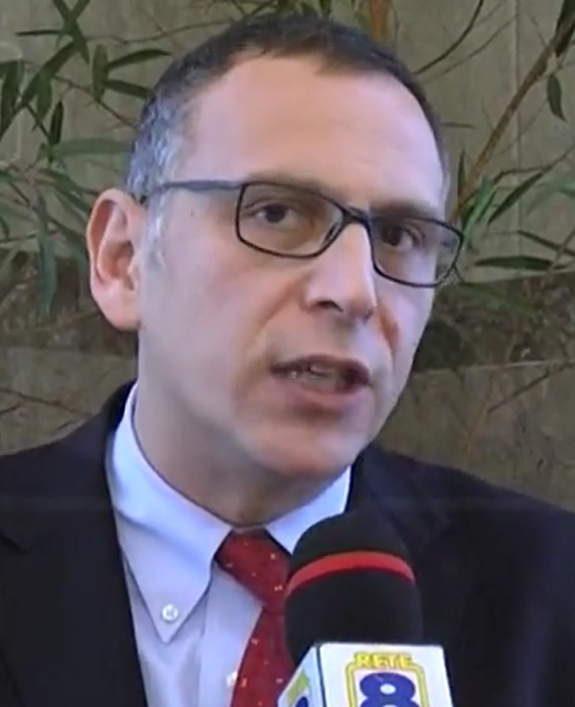

Mayor of Pescara
- In office 15 June 2014 – 10 June 2019
- Preceded by: Luigi Albore Mascia
- Succeeded by: Carlo Masci

Personal details
- Born: 25 December 1970 (age 55) Pescara, Abruzzo, Italy
- Party: Democratic Party
- Profession: lawyer

Marco Alessandrini (born 25 December 1970 in Pescara) is an Italian politician.

He is a member of the Democratic Party and he was elected Mayor of Pescara on 8 June 2014. In 2019 he chose to not run for a second term.

== Biography ==
He is the son of Deputy Public Prosecutor Emilio Alessandrini, who was assassinated in Milan on January 29, 1979, by the terrorist group Prima Linea. He graduated in Law from the University of Milan in 1995 and completed his internship at a law firm. He then returned to Pescara, where he practiced as a civil lawyer. For years, he collaborated with the Gabriele d'Annunzio University and authored several commentaries on civil law.

== See also ==
- 2014 Italian local elections
- List of mayors of Pescara

Political offices
Preceded by Luigi Albore Mascia	Mayor of Pescara; 2014–2019	Succeeded by Carlo Masci
