= De Caro =

De Caro may refer to:

== People ==
- Antonio de Caro (died 1517), Italian Roman Catholic Bishop of Nardò and of Avellino e Frigento
- Baldassarre De Caro (1689–1750), Italian painter
- Carlos Moreno de Caro (born 1946), Colombian politician
- Francisco de Caro (1898–1976), Argentine pianist and composer
- Gerolamo de Caro (died 1560), Italian Roman Catholic Titular Archbishop of Nazareth
- Julio de Caro (1899–1980), Argentine composer, musician and conductor
- Lorenzo de Caro (1719–1777), Italian painter
- Lucio De Caro (1922–2008), Italian screenwriter and film director
- Mario De Caro (born 1963), Italian philosopher
- Raffaele De Caro (1883–1961), Italian politician

== Places ==
- Serra de Caro, the highest mountain of the Ports de Tortosa-Beseit, Catalonia, Spain

== See also ==
- DeCaro (disambiguation)
- Caro (surname)
