= De Carli =

de Carli is a surname. Notable people with the surname include:

- Adelir Antônio de Carli (1966–2008), Brazilian Catholic priest and balloonist
- Giampiero de Carli (born 1970), Italian rugby union player and coach

== See also ==
- De Carle
- De Carlo
- Marco di Carli
