= Calbo =

Calbo may refer to:

- Bernat Calbó (or Calvó) (c. 1180–1243), sometimes called Bernard of Calvo, a Catalan jurist, bureaucrat, monk, bishop, and soldier
- Calbo (rapper) (1973–2026), French rapper of Guinean origin, and a member of rap duo Ärsenik
- Calbo family, later on Calbo-Crotta, mercantile family originating from Padua and then established in Venice starting the year 891

== See also ==
- Calbovista, a fungal genus
- Carbo (disambiguation)
