= Sidral Mundet =

Mexican carbonated soft drink

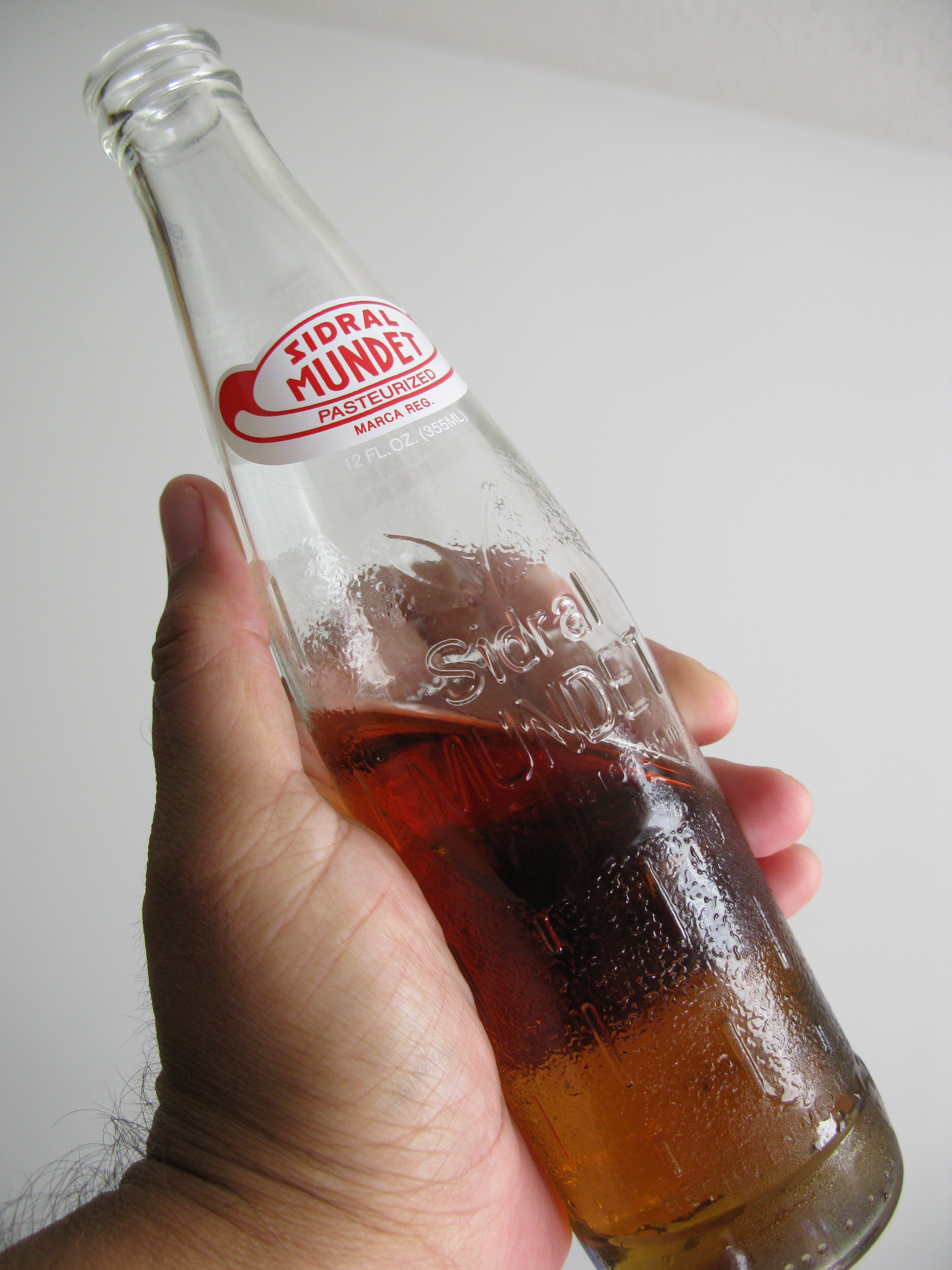
Sidral Mundet

Sidral Mundet is a Mexican apple-flavored carbonated soft drink produced by Coca-Cola FEMSA and distributed in the United States by the Novamex company, which also distributes the Jarritos and Sangria Señorial soda brands.

== History ==
Sidral Mundet was first bottled in 1902 by Don Arturo Mundet, who produced the cider-flavored beverage. Basing Sidral Mundet on the "limonada" or "gaseosa" drinks that were popular in Mexico at the turn of the 20th century, he utilized the pasteurization technique to keep the drink sterile in the bottling process. The drink has been renowned in Mexico for its nourishing and hydrating abilities and has sometimes been used as a home remedy for stomach aches. In 1988, Novamex introduced Sidral Mundet to the United States. In the years since, it has grown in popularity among Americans.

== Varieties ==
Sidral Mundet is available in six flavors: red apple, green apple, golden apple, plum, peach, and pear.
