= Chaparritas El Naranjo =

Mexican beverage

- Manufacturer: Mezgo
- Country of origin: Mexico
- Introduced: 1947
- Flavor: Grape, tangerine and pineapple.
- Related products: Sangria Señorial; Barrilitos; Trébol
- Website: www.chaparritaselnaranjo.com.mx

Chaparritas El Naranjo is a pasteurized and non-carbonated beverage owned by the Spaniard Company Mezgo (Chairman Gonzalo Manuel Gómez y Martínez de Escobar). It was the first bottled non-carbonated beverage in Mexico, and was introduced in 1947).

== Flavors ==
- Grape
- Tangerine
- Pineapple
