= List of mayors of Pescara =

Mayor of Pescara
- Sindaco di Pescara

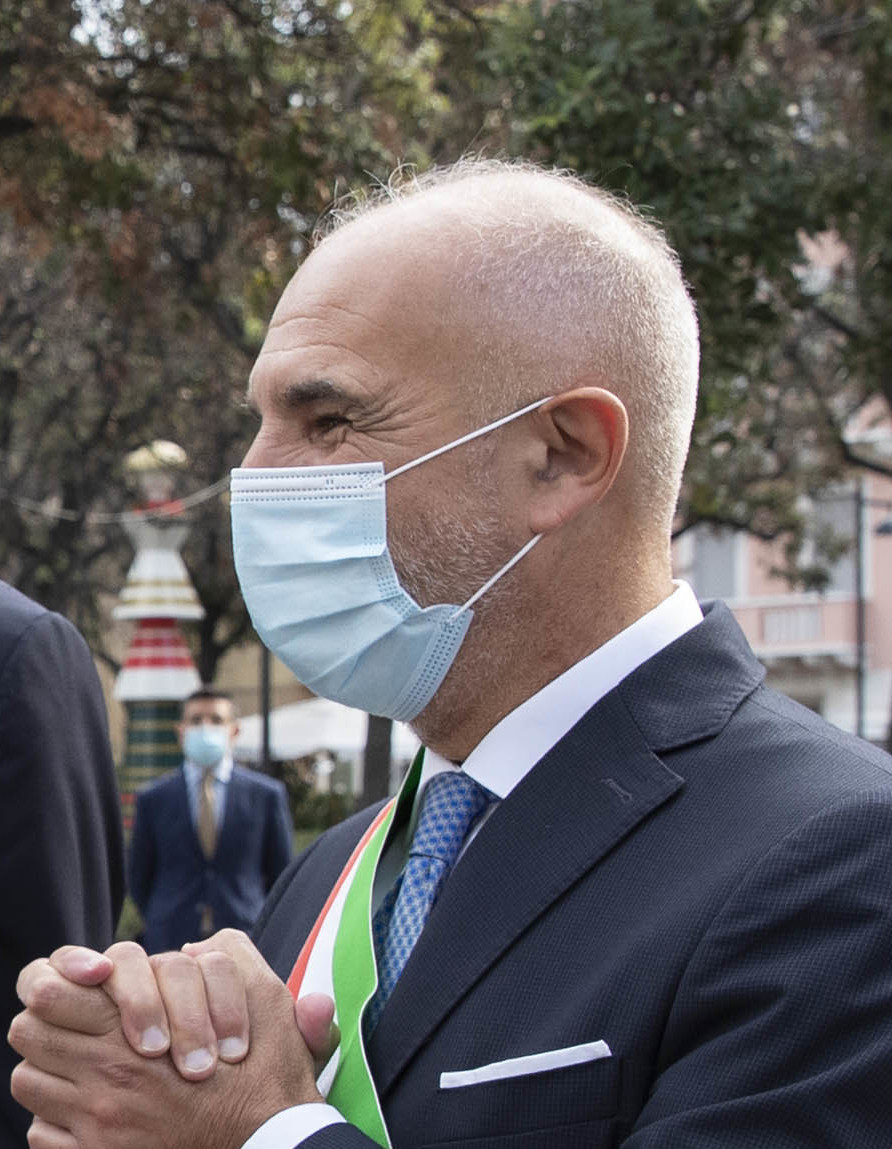
- Incumbent; Carlo Masci (FI) since 10 June 2019
- Appointer: Popular election
- Term length: 5 years, renewable once
- Formation: 1860
- Website: Official website

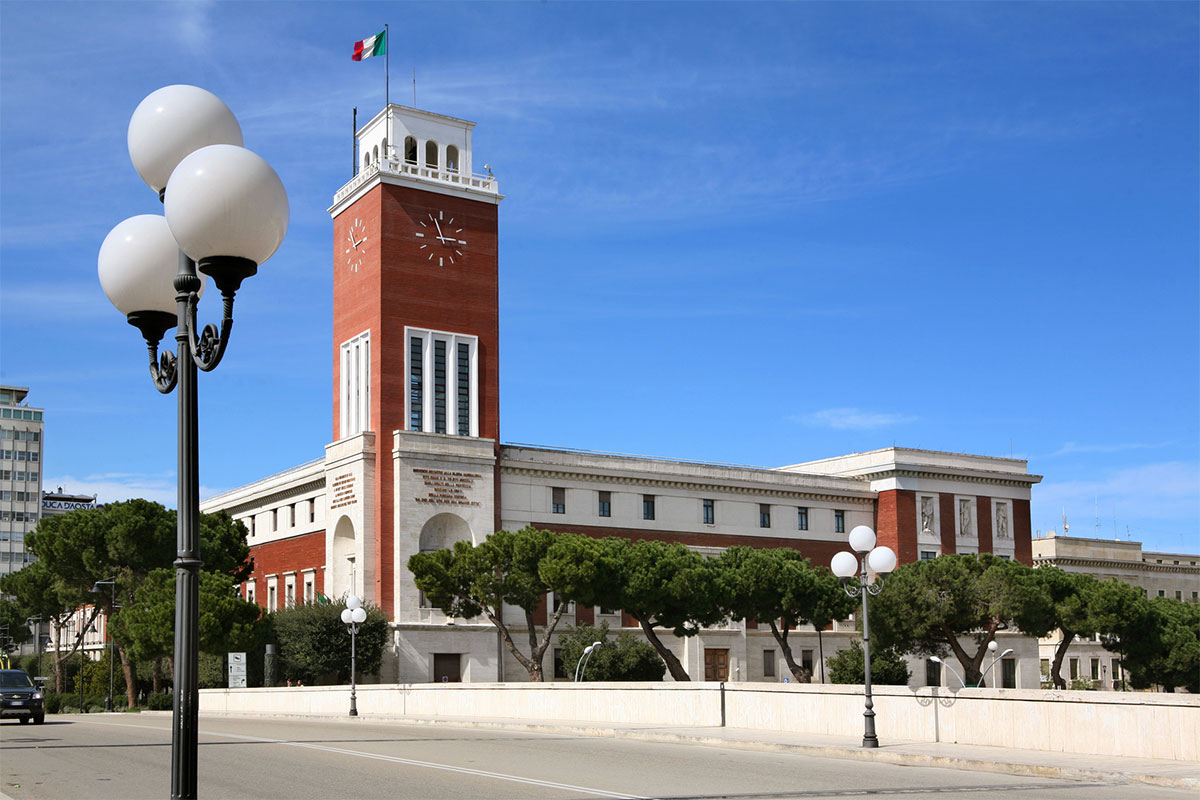

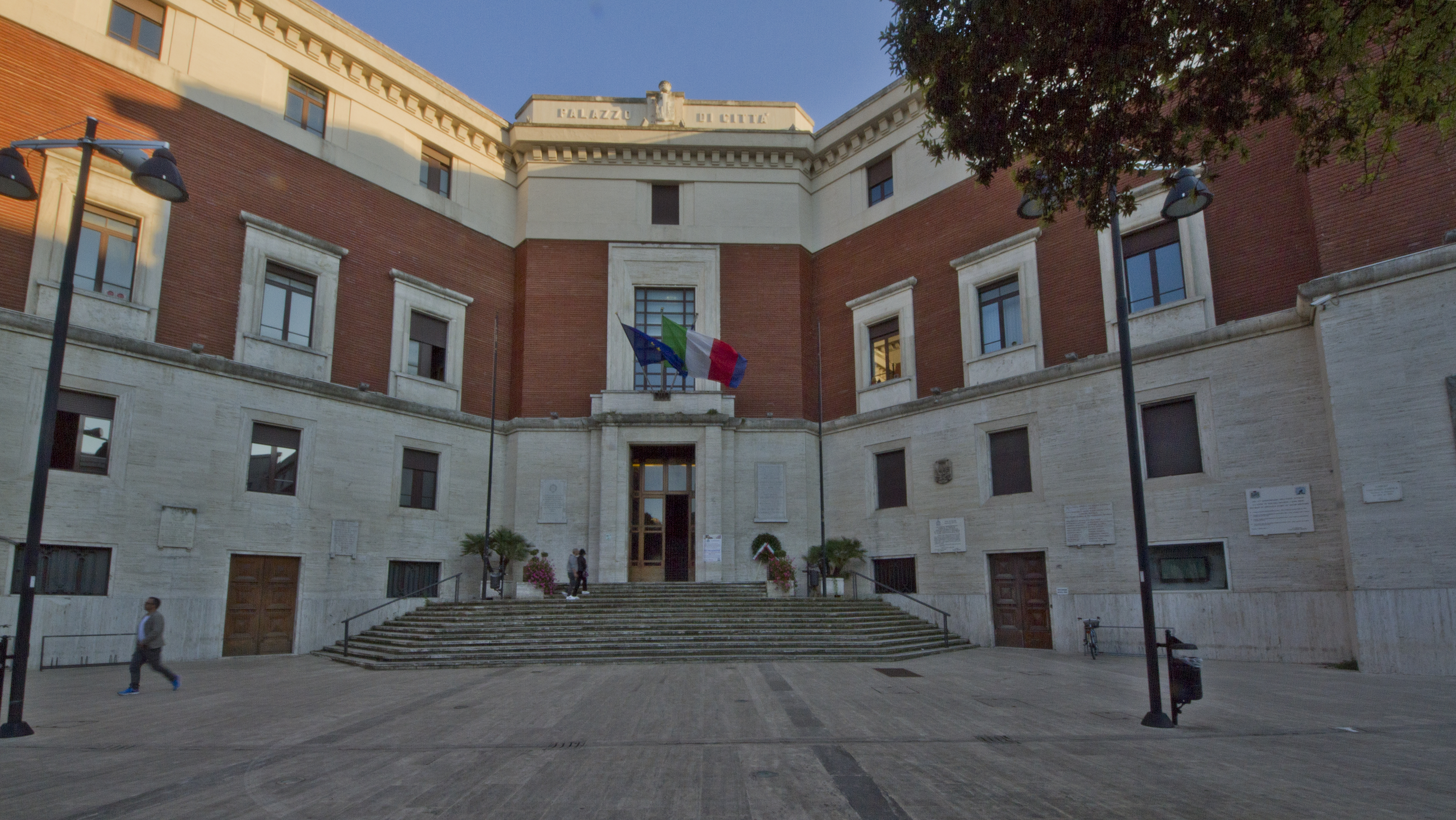
Palazzo di città is the seat of the Mayor of Pescara.

The mayor of Pescara is an elected politician who, along with the Pescara's city council, is accountable for the strategic government of Pescara in Abruzzo, Italy.

The current mayor is Carlo Masci (FI) who took office on 10 June 2019.

== Overview ==
According to the Italian Constitution, the mayor of Pescara is member of the city council.

The mayor is elected by the population of Pescara, who also elects the members of the city council, controlling the mayor's policy guidelines and is able to enforce his resignation by a motion of no confidence. The mayor is entitled to appoint and release the members of his government.

Since 1993 the mayor is elected directly by Pescara's electorate: in all mayoral elections in Italy in cities with a population higher than 15,000 the voters express a direct choice for the mayor or an indirect choice voting for the party of the candidate's coalition. If no candidate receives at least 50% of votes, the top two candidates go to a second round after two weeks. The election of the City Council is based on a direct choice for the candidate with a preference vote: the candidate with the majority of the preferences is elected. The number of the seats for each party is determined proportionally.

== Republic of Italy (since 1946) ==
=== City Council election (1946-1993) ===
From 1946 to 1993, the Mayor of Pescara was elected by the City Council.

	Mayor	Term start	Term end	Party
1	Italo Giovannucci	1946	1948	PSI
2	Mario Muzii	1948	1951	Ind
3	Vincenzo Chiola	1951	1956	PCI
4	Antonio Mancini	1956	1963	DC
5	Gaetano Novello	1963	1971	DC
6	Giuseppe D'Incecco	1971	1973	DC
7	Alberto Casalini	1973	1985	DC
8	Gabriella Bosco	1985	1986	DC
9	Nevio Piscione	1986	1988	DC
10	Michele De Martiis	1988	1990	DC
11	Giuseppe Ciccantelli	1990	1993	DC

=== Direct election (since 1993) ===
Since 1993, under provisions of new local administration law, the Mayor of Pescara is chosen by direct election, originally every four, then every five years.

	Mayor	Term start	Term end	Party	Coalition	Election
12	Mario Collevecchio (b. 1939)	6 December 1993	21 May 1994 (Note: Election declared void.)	PDS	PDS • PRC • AD • LR	1993
Special Prefectural Commissioner tenure (21 May 1994 – 5 December 1994)
13	Carlo Pace (1936–2017)	5 December 1994	1 December 1998	Ind	Pole of Freedoms (FI-AN-CCD)	1994
13	Carlo Pace (1936–2017)	1 December 1998	10 June 2003	Ind	Pole for Freedoms (FI-AN-CCD)	1998
14	Luciano D'Alfonso (b. 1965)	10 June 2003	15 April 2008	DL; PD	The Olive Tree (DS-DL-PRC-SDI)	2003
14	Luciano D'Alfonso (b. 1965)	15 April 2008	5 January 2009 (Note: Resigned.)	DL; PD	PD • IdV • PSI	2008
Special Prefectural Commissioner tenure (5 January 2009 – 8 June 2009)
15	Luigi Albore Mascia (b. 1965)	8 June 2009	15 June 2014	PdL; FI	PdL • UDC	2009
16	Marco Alessandrini (b. 1970)	15 June 2014	10 June 2019	PD	PD • SEL	2014
17	Carlo Masci (b. 1958)	10 June 2019	10 June 2024	FI	Lega • FI • FdI	2019
17	Carlo Masci (b. 1958)	10 June 2024	Incumbent	FI	Lega • FI • FdI	2024
