= Luigi Albore Mascia =

Italian politician

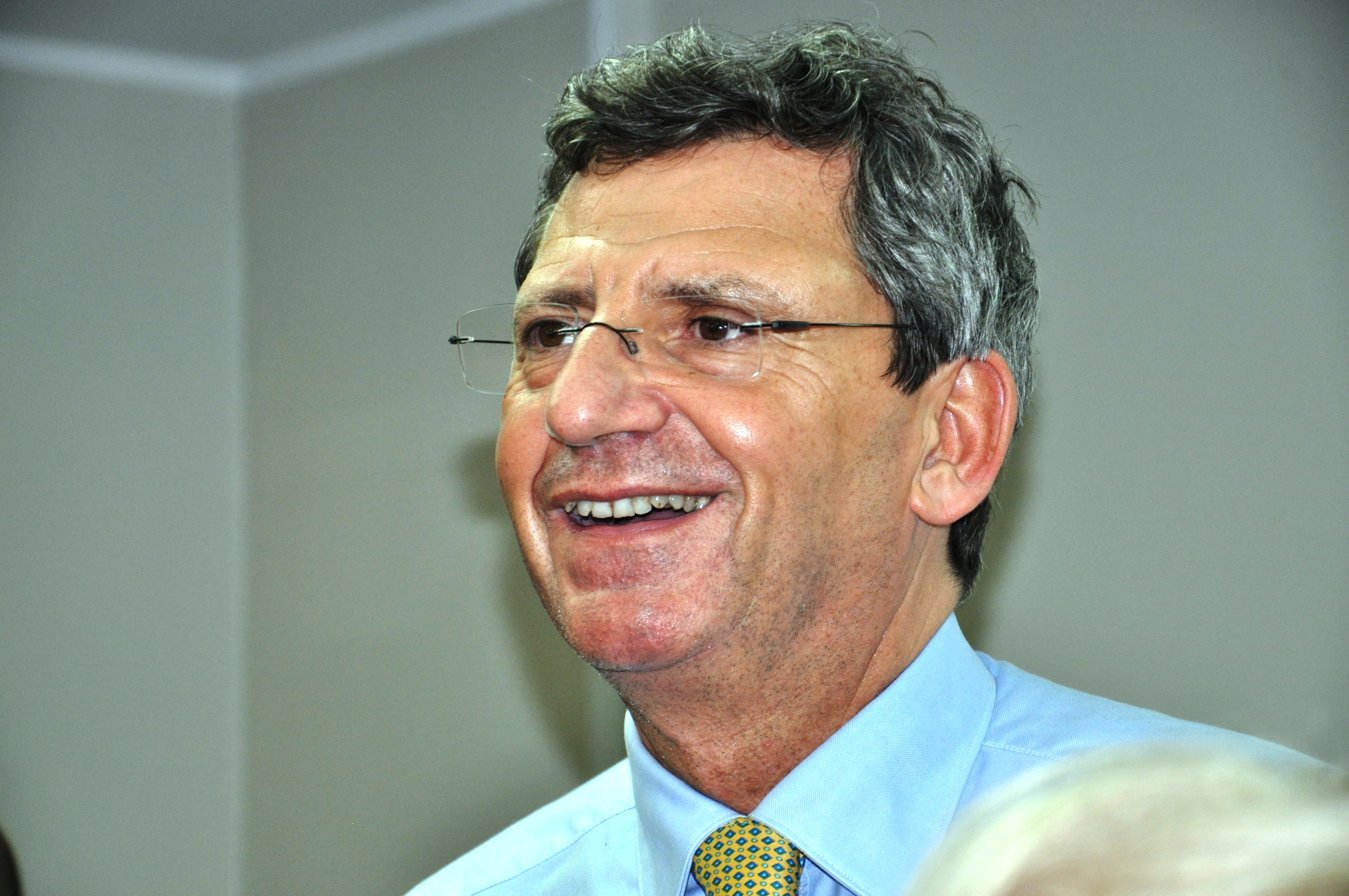
- Portrait of Luigi Albore Mascia

Mayor of Pescara
- In office 8 June 2009 – 15 June 2014
- Preceded by: Luciano D'Alfonso
- Succeeded by: Marco Alessandrini

Personal details
- Born: 8 September 1965 (age 60) Pescara, Abruzzo, Italy
- Party: Italian Republican Party (1988-1995); National Alliance (1995-2009); The People of Freedom (2009-2013); Forza Italia (since 2013)
- Profession: lawyer

Luigi Albore Mascia (born 8 September 1965 in Pescara) is an Italian politician.

He was a member of the centre-right party The People of Freedom and served as Mayor of Pescara from 8 June 2009 to 15 June 2014. Mascia ran for a second term at the 2014 elections but lost to the Democratic Party candidate Marco Alessandrini.

== See also ==
- 2009 Italian local elections
- List of mayors of Pescara

Political offices
Preceded by Luciano D'Alfonso	Mayor of Pescara; 2009–2014	Succeeded by Marco Alessandrini
