= Kardo Bestilo =

Angolan writer

- Born: 1976 (age 49–50)
- Occupation: Writer
- Known for: Member of the Arts Movement

Kardo Bestilo (born in 1976) is an Angolan writer, member of the Arts Movement LEV´ARTE born a year after the country gained independence from Portugal. He writes in Portuguese and English.

== Books ==
- ControVerso (Poetry), edited by Europress Editores, 2006.
