= Cardo polymer =

Subgroup of polymers

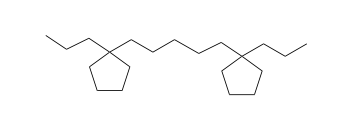
General structure of a cardo polymer

Cardo polymers are a sub group of polymers where ring structures are pendent to the polymer backbone. The backbone carbons bonded to the pendent ring structures are quaternary centers. As such, the cyclic side group lies perpendicular to the plane of the extended (all trans conformation) polymer chain. These side rings are bulky structures which sterically hinder rotation of the backbone bonds; they also disrupt chain packing and thus create greater free volume than found in conventional polymer structures. The rotational restrictions placed on the polymer backbone increase the value of the characteristic ratio, leading to what is referred to as a "rigid" or "stiff" backbone. The sterically driven large rotational potential produces a high glass transition temperature and the disrupted packing yields comparatively high values for gas and other small molecule solubilities in these polymers. Because of these physical effects, recent advances in membranes used for gas separation have used cardo polymers.

== Properties ==
Cardo polymers possess high thermal stability, (i.e., a high glass transition temperature), and high solubility. Rigid polymers with large segments have increased glass transition temperatures. The quaternary carbon and bulky ring structure of cardo polymers result in a highly rigid structure, since there are significant restraints on the rotational motion of the polymer bonds. Solubility generally increases with a decrease in rigidity. This is usually problematic because increasing solubility and increasing thermal stability are often in conflict with each other. However, the addition of a cardo group increases solubility because the bulky structure creates steric hindrance, preventing the polymer chain from packing tightly. This loose packing offers more surface area for the polymer to interact with the solvent, increasing the solubility. Polymers with more polar cardo groups are more soluble that those with less polar groups. Not only are interactions between polar components on the polymer backbone and the solvent occurring, but also interactions between polar components of the cardo group and the solvent. The net interactions are what give cardo polymers their high solubility.

== Synthesis ==
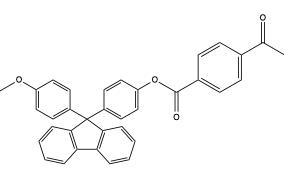
The chemical structure of the repeat unit of a cardo aromatic polyester, with a bisphenol structure incorporated in the backbone

The synthesis of cardo polymers utilizes the same techniques as most polymer synthesis. However, the bulky, and often non-polar cardo monomers do offer some challenges, requiring unique synthetic tactics.

=== Aromatic Polyesters ===
Cardo aromatic polyesters form a type of cardo polymer in which an ester group is incorporated in the backbone of the polymer chain and the ester groups are separated by an aromatic ring. A common form of cardo aromatic polyesters are ones in which bisphenol is incorporated into the monomers. These polymers can be synthesized via polycondensation. The hydroxyl groups coming off the bisphenol component of the monomers can react with acid chlorides, producing hydrochloric acid as a byproduct. This synthesis is commonly carried out via interfacial polycondensation. However, low temperature and high temperature solution polycondensation conditions are also used. High molecular weight cardo aromatic polyesters can also be achieved via low temperature, acceptor catalytic polycondensation methods.

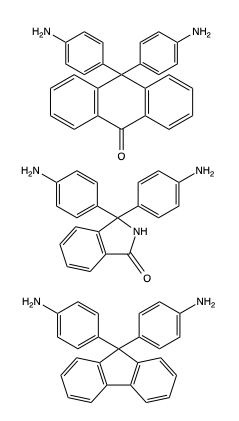
The structure of some monomers used to construct cardo aromatic polyamides

=== Aromatic Polyamides ===
Cardo aromatic polyamides have amides incorporated into the backbone, separated by aromatic rings. The aromatic diamines have a low basicity that provides additional challenges to synthesis. Notably, they cannot be synthesized via melt polycondensation. The diamines are not polar enough to dissolve in water, making interfacial polycondensation methods challenging; there has been success from 4’,4” -diphenyl phthalide dicarboxylic chloride and aliphatic diamines as the two phases of the solutions in where the polycondensation can occur at their interface. More commonly, these polymers are synthesized from low temperature solution polycondensation via a reaction with acid chlorides, producing hydrochloric acid as a byproduct. These reactions are done under basic conditions in aprotic solvents, often in the presence of an inorganic salt, such as calcium chloride, to increase solubility.

=== Polyimides ===
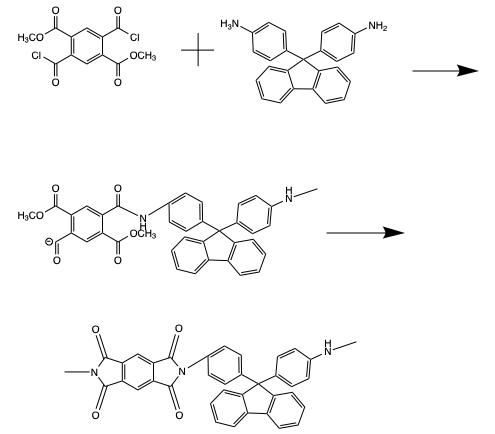
The two-step synthesis scheme for a cardo polyimide

Polyimides are polymers made up of imide group is incorporated into the monomers, with the imide existing in the backbone of the chain. These can be synthesized by either a one-step route or a two-step route. The two-step route involves first reacting the diamine monomer with an acid chloride or carboxylic acid to form a polygamic acid. Heating the polygamic acid then results in cyclodehydration, forming the imide. Alternatively, the synthesis can be carried out in one step in which chain grown and ring closure happen simultaneously. This reaction occurs at high temperatures in organic solvents including cresol, nitrobenzene, benzonitrile, and sulfolane. The diamide is dissolved, and then dianhydrides are added to the solution before the temperature is raised. The reaction is raised to temperatures within the range of 100-200 degrees Celsius and quenched with methanol. This one step synthesis produces higher molecular weight polymer chains than the two step synthesis and is now the preferred method.

== Application to gas transport ==
The only application of cardo polymers currently being investigated in great detail involves, the use of cardo polymers in the development of thin membranes for gas transport and separation. In general, as the amount of free volume in a material increases, the higher the gas permeability. Also, with increased rigidity of the polymer comes an increase in the gas selectivity. Cardo polymers have a great deal of free volume since their bulky structure prevents tight packing, and a rigid backbone since the rings restrict rotational motion. Thus, cardo polymers act as a highly permeable, yet selective membrane material. To further increase permeability, many of the cardo polymers produced for gas transport have additional large side groups, such as tert-butyl groups, increasing the free volume of the material. Intermolecular forces play a key role in finding a balance between high permeability and high permselectivity. Specifically, strong intermolecular attractions arising from hydrogen bonding greatly inhibit the mobility of segments of the polymer chains resulting in a rigid, densely packed structure relative to a cardo polymer with only minor intermolecular interactions. These tightly packed, rigid structures decrease the gas permeability of the polymers by restricting the rate at which the gas can diffuse through the membrane. However, this effect is much stronger on large gas molecules such as oxygen and nitrogen compared to small gas molecules. This effect results in an increased permselectivity where the membrane will restrict the transport of large gas molecule, favoring that of small gas molecules.

These gas transport membranes must be ultra-thin and are most commonly obtained via a phase inversion process. This process requires the polymer to be soluble in organic solvents. The process works by first dissolving the polymers in solution. The solution is then placed on a glass plate and the plate is submerged in a liquid coagulation medium. During the transfer process, some solvent evaporation occurs, but mostly on the surface of the membrane. This results in the region exposed to the air being more concentrated and forming a skin layer. The structure of these asymmetric membranes include a porous sub structure and a denser external skin structure. The high solubility of cardo polymers means these membranes can be easily produced.
