= Kali Kalo =

Greek actress (1926–2024)

- Καλή Καλό
- Born: Kalliopi Damvergi; 20 December 1926; Athens, Greece
- Died: 8 March 2024 (aged 97); Athens, Greece
- Occupation: Actress
- Years active: 1931–2024
- Spouse: George Mamalakis (m. 1945; died 1946) Dimitris Valmas (m. 1957; div. 1959) Kostas Karanikolas (m. 1959; died 1979)
- Children: 2

Kalliopi Damvergi (Greek: Καλλιόπη Δαμβέργη; 20 December 1926 – 8 March 2024) was a Greek actress of film, stage and television.

== Early life and career ==
Damvergi was born in Athens in 1926, her origin is from Rethymno, her mother Chrysa was an actress and her father was a pharmaceutical manufacturer.

Damvergi's first appearance in a theater performance was at the age of just three, in Daskalitsa by Dario Nikkontemi, following a decision by Marika Kotopouli, in whose theater her mother performed. Her first real role, however, was at the age of 5, specially written for her by Spyros Melas in his play Dad is Educating, where she achieved great success playing alongside Vassilis Logothetides and the Mousouris couple at the "Aliki" theater.

Damvergi studied for many years at the classical ballet school of the Royal (now National) Theater and others. An image of her as a child prodigy was being formed, something like the Shirley Temple of Greece, however her mother's divorce and the war with the occupation interrupted this as mother and daughter began touring with "packs" in the countryside for their survival. Her post-war membership in the KKE led to her arrest in 1947 from the theater, while appearing in the revue "To pardalo katsiki", and to her displacement for six months in Icaria.

== Personal life ==
Kali was married three times, first to Georges Mamalakis from 1945 to 1946. They had a daughter. In 1957, she married Dimitri Valmas until 1959 and that year she married Kostas Karanikolas until 1979. They had a son named Christos who at the age of 13, was seriously injured by an explosion in a chemistry experiment. He died in 1988 at the age of 27.

Kalo died in Girokomeio, Athens on 8 March 2024, at the age of 97.

== Filmography ==
- Nights in Athens (1954) - Afroditi Barouti
- Love Stories (1959) - Hrysa
- I Want a Forceful Man (1959) - Paulina
- Tmima ithon (1994)
- ...ki avrio mera einai (2001)
