= Di Carlo =

Di Carlo is a surname with Germanic origins. Notable people with the surname include:

- Adelia Di Carlo (1883–1965), Argentine writer and chronicler
- Antonio Di Carlo (born 1962), Italian football player
- Domenico Di Carlo (born 1964), Italian football player and coach
- Elio Augusto Di Carlo (1918–1998), Italian ornithologist, historian and physician
- Francesco Di Carlo (1941–2020), Italian mafia informer
- Grégory Di Carlo (born 1993), French motorcycle racer
- Ray Di Carlo (early 21st c.), American producer and director

== See also ==
- De Carlo
- DiCarlo
