= Cargoe =

American pop and rock band

CARGOE
- Origin: Tulsa, Oklahoma/Memphis, TN
- Genres: Power pop, Southern rock, Tulsa Sound
- Years active: 1968–1973, 2009–present
- Labels: Rubbery Cargoe Records
- Members: Bill Phillips; Max Wisley; Tim Benton; Steve Thornbrugh
- Past members: Tom Richard; Manager/Producers: Jim Peters; Robert W. Walker
- Website: Cargoe's myspace

Cargoe is an American pop rock band from Tulsa, Oklahoma, originally formed in the late 1960s as Rubbery Cargoe, whose lone studio album, produced and engineered by Terry Manning, was released on Memphis, TN-based Ardent Records in 1972. They moved to Memphis in 1970 with the help of Robert W. Walker and Jim Peters to begin their recording career with producer Dan Penn. They later signed with Ardent Records where they recorded alongside Big Star in the original National Street Ardent Studios location, as well as the new studio built on Madison Avenue in 1971.

Keyboardist/ guitarist/ vocalist/ songwriter Bill Phillips and guitarist/ bassist/ vocalist/ songwriter Max Wisley formed the pop/rock quartet Rubbery Cargoe in the mid-1960s. The Tulsa-based group went through various incarnations, eventually choosing drummer/ vocalist/ songwriter Tim Benton and lead guitarist/ vocalist/ songwriter Tom Richard and later changed the name to Cargoe.

Cargoe epitomized the funky Tulsa sound.

== The Memphis years ==
The band that would become Cargoe established major roots in the Tulsa Music scene of the mid to late 1960s. They were Rubbery Cargoe, the psychedelic "house" band of the teen-only night club, The Machine. It was there that Cargoe became forever linked with Jim Peters of local AM radio KAKC fame, who was the sound, lighting, and voice of The Machine. As Rubbery Cargoe, they began writing original material, and opened for bands of the day including The Cowsills, and Eric Burdon and the Animals.

When “The Machine” closed, there were few places that catered to musicians playing original material. Phillips began college in Norman, and the band did not get together for weeks and months at a time. During the summer of 1969, Rubbery Cargoe got a gig in Colorado Springs at a club that allowed them to play their own material. This turned out to be a turning point for the band. After they returned to Tulsa, Peters organized a recording session at KVOO, where the first Rubbery Cargoe demos were created. Peters' younger brother Tim, who was a soprano at the Trinity Church men and boys choir, sang high note harmony on their demo tape. Disc Jockey and close personal friend Robert W. Walker had moved to Memphis, TN where he was music director and radio personality for WHBQ. Through Walker's connection with Dan Penn of The Box Tops fame, he created the opportunity for the band to make their very first record at Penn's new Beautiful Sounds studio in Memphis. Walker and Peters would co-produce, engineer, and mix, while Beautiful would own the masters and recoup their expenses upon sale or lease of the masters to a record company. Peters and the band moved to Memphis in 1970, living with Walker, while they recorded their album in four days. Later that year they all moved into an old Antebellum house at 1972 Cowden. For all involved, the address had a “magic ring” to it.

Dan Penn and his partner at Beautiful Sounds, Eddie Braddock, had connections in the record business, so when the album neared completion, Walker and Peters went looking for bidders. Epic Records and Atlantic Records were ready to sign the original Beautiful Sounds album Peters and Walker had produced - firm offers were made - but Penn's business partners wanted to hold out for more advance money. Meanwhile, they put out a single on their own, on Penn's in-house label "Beautiful". The original Feel Allright went to No. 1 on Memphis radio and started spreading across the South, only to be stymied because Beautiful lacked the national distribution necessary to make it an across-the-board smash. Another major missed opportunity (harbinger of problems that would spill into the years ahead.)

Peters and Walker had managed the band all the way from Tulsa and into an opportunity few bands ever get the chance to experience. As musicians, the band members were disengaged business-wise. They became disenchanted that nothing was happening, and things were falling apart again. Tensions were rising between them all, and the spirit of the adventure was fading. By the end of 1970, Walker was offered a job in Miami radio, and was ready to go. The band and Peters remained in Memphis. Ardent owner John Fry, through Walker and Peters' introduction, had lent the band money to buy equipment, so that relationship developed into the Ardent recordings. That was the end of Walker and Peters' involvement with Cargoe.

== Moving on to Ardent Records ==
Often associated with the Power Pop genre given to Ardent label-mates Big Star, Cargoe projected more of a stylized artistic nuance to their songwriting and performing, with harmonies exhibiting a strong American/Southern Roots cultural influence.

The band recorded their Album CARGOE with Terry Manning producing at, John Fry's Ardent Studios. They scored numerous Billboard and Cashbox Top 100 listings, and reviews from 1970 through 1973, along with major radio play of their first single “Feel Alright” and follow-up “I Love You Anyway”. The band's studio LP CARGOE was even featured, with Isaac Hayes Shaft, which won an Academy Award that year for Best Original Song, in a Special Edition section of Billboard’s June 3, 1972 “The Deck is STAX” promotion.

The band began a west coast tour the summer of 1972, but was caught up in the distribution and bankruptcy label problems at Stax/Volt, who distributed the album and owned the masters. Distribution was sold to Columbia Records who failed to include Cargoe in their catalog, which meant that listeners who heard the hit could not actually buy the record. “Feel Alright” and their debut CARGOE LP fell off the charts instantly.

The same label troubles caused both Cargoe and Big Star to disband within a short time.

Ardent Records contracts for distribution with Stax/Volt gave Stax ownership of the master tapes. When Stax went bankrupt in the mid-'70s, ownership of the masters eventually wound up in the hands of Fantasy Records Saul Zaentz, and no one's been able to get the tapes for domestic release.

After nearly 40 years of producing and engineering countless hit records including ZZ Top, Led Zeppelin, George Thorogood, Celine Dion, Björk, Lenny Kravitz, Mariah Carey, Shania Twain, and many others, Terry Manning to this day regards Cargoe as “the great record he helped make that no one ever discovered”.

== Members ==
- Bill Phillips - Hammond B-3, Rhodes and Grand Piano, Acoustic Guitar, Vocals.
- Max Wisley - Höfner Bass, Acoustic Guitar, Vocals.
- Steve Thornbrugh: Lead Guitar, Acoustic Guitar, Vocals.
- Tim Benton: Drums, Percussion, Acoustic Guitar, Vocals.
- Tommy Richard: Guitar & Vocals

All members contributed lead vocals and songwriting.

== Discography ==
- CARGOE - 1972
- Cargoe “Live in Memphis - 2004
- Cargoe - Twenty-Ten - 2010
