= Carlo Masci =

Italian politician (born 1958)

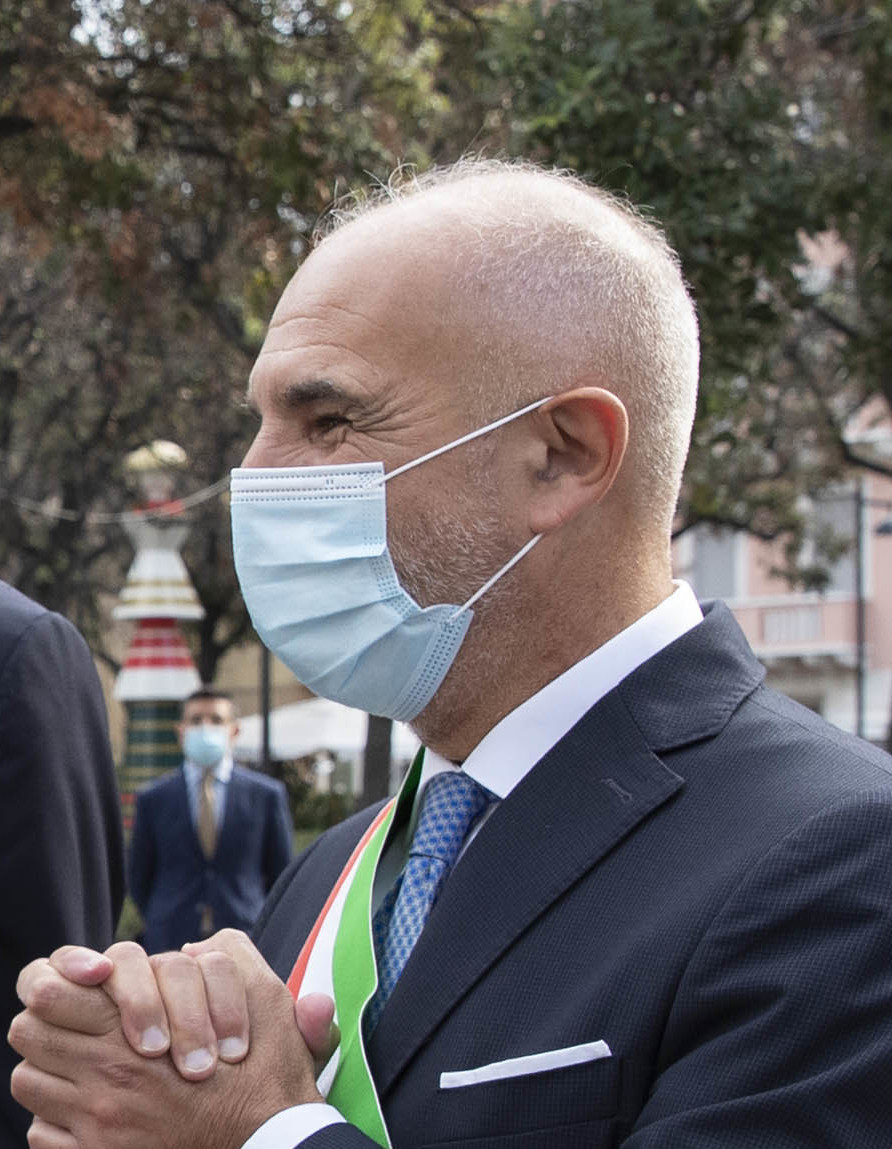

Mayor of Pescara
- Incumbent
- Assumed office 10 June 2019
- Preceded by: Marco Alessandrini

Member of the Provincial Council of Pescara
- In office 31 July 2004 – 16 February 2005

Member of the Regional Council of Abruzzo
- In office 9 January 2009 – 10 June 2014

Regional assessor of Finance, Institutional reforms and Sports of Abruzzo
- In office 19 January 2009 – 10 June 2014
- President: Giovanni Chiodi

Personal details
- Born: 27 November 1958 (age 67) Pescara, Italy
- Party: Forza Italia
- Education: University of Parma
- Profession: Lawyer

Carlo Masci (born 27 November 1958) is an Italian politician.

== Life and career ==
He entered in politics in 1994 as a member of the centre-right party Forza Italia. In 2004 Masci was elected at the Provincial Council of Pescara. From 2009 to 2004 he served as a member of the Regional Council of Abruzzo and as the regional assessor of Finance, Institutional reforms and Sports of the Region Abruzzo.

Masci ran for mayor of Pescara in the 2003 and in the 2009 local elections, but he was elected mayor on 28 May 2019, when he ran at the elections for the third time. Masci took office on 10 June 2019.

== See also ==
- 2019 Italian local elections
- List of mayors of Pescara

Political offices
Preceded by Marco Alessandrini	Mayor of Pescara since 2019	Succeeded by
