= Cargo (game) =

Board game

Cargo is a 2004 board game published by Wingnut Games.

== Gameplay ==
Cargo is a game in which the Boston Tea Party is reimagined as a chaotic contest of bribery, sabotage, and survival, where players juggle conflicting priorities between dumping tea, rescuing paid-off cargo, or crushing rivals under crates.

== Reviews ==
- Pyramid
- Backstab
