= Caló (surname) =

Caló is a Portuguese and Spanish surname. Notable people with the surname include:

== Surname ==
- Francisco Caló, Portuguese footballer
- Miguel Caló, Argentinian tango bandoneonist

== Nickname ==
- Caló (footballer), Cape Verdean footballer

== See also ==
- Caloy
- Carlo (name)
