= Recinte Mundet =

Area in Barcelona, Spain

Coordinates: 41°26′13.7″N 2°8′40.4″E

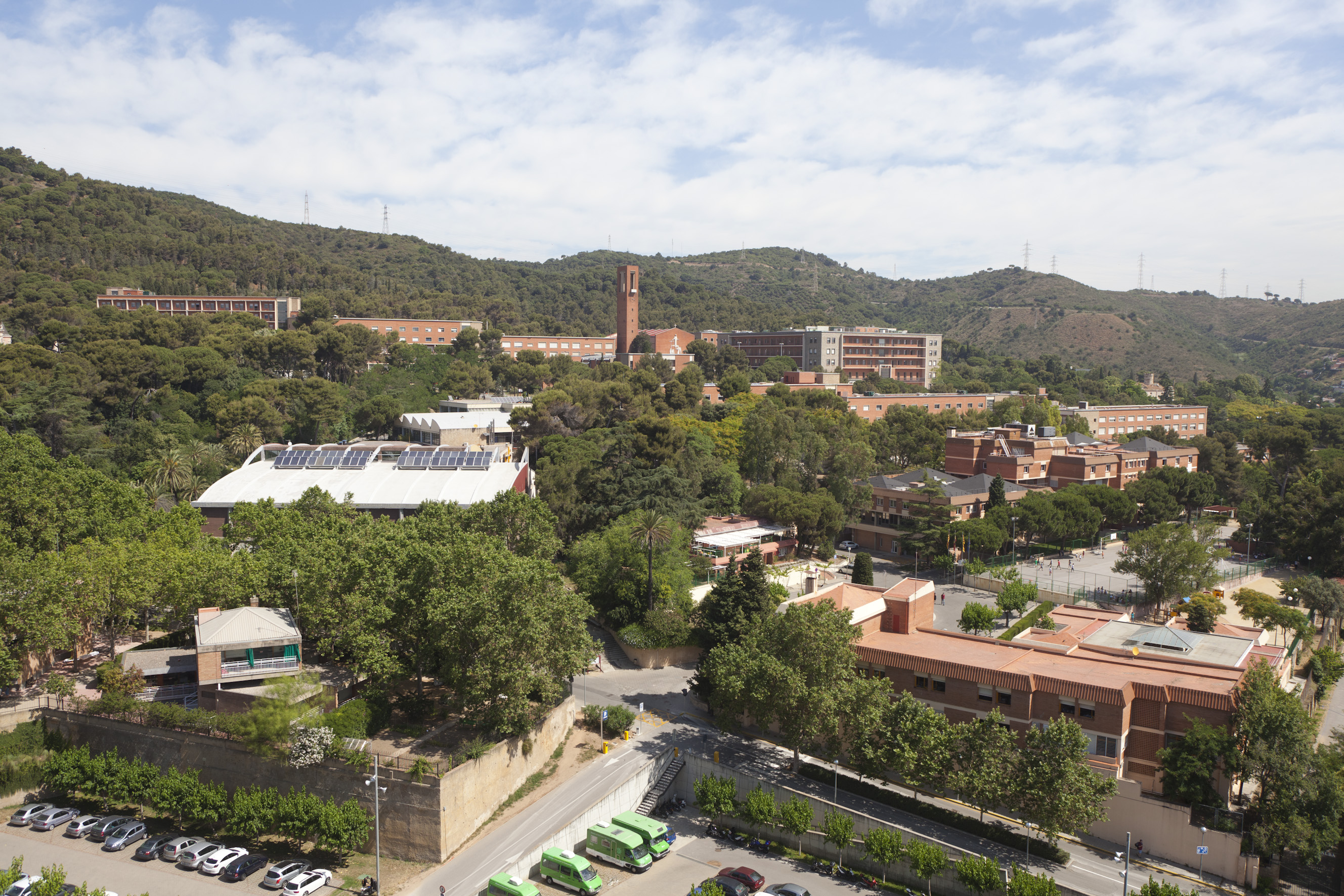
View over the Recinte Mundet looking north; the tower of the church of Llars Mundet can be seen centre shot

The Recinte Mundet, also known as the Llars Mundet, Hogares Mundet or Campus Mundet, is an area of the Spanish and Catalan city of Barcelona, within the district of Horta-Guinardó and neighbourhood of Montbau.

It originally housed a charitable institution, founded in 1957 by the Catalan-Mexican philanthropist Artur Mundet, which cared for orphans, the elderly, sick and needy. Today it houses a campus of the University of Barcelona, together with various educational and social services of the Barcelona Provincial Council.

Mundet station, on line L3 of the Barcelona Metro, is a five-minute walk from the campus.
