= Mary Holbrook =

Cheesemaker and curator

Mary Holbrook (1939 – 2019) was a British cheesemaker and curator. She studied archaeology and worked in museums before retiring to work on her family farm in Timsbury, Somerset, England, where she kept goats and pigs. The goats were milked to make a variety of cheeses which were sold through gourmet outlets such as Harrods and Neal's Yard Dairy.

Holbrook held a PhD in ancient history and archaeology and previously worked cataloguing early scientific instruments in Frankfurt and as a curator at a museum in Bath. She later turned to dairy farming at Sleight Farm in Somerset, part of her husband John Holbrook’s family estate. She began making goat cheese in the mid-1970s with surplus milk from two goats, initially selling through local health food shops. Inspired by French artisanal cheesemaking, she adopted their moulds and techniques, contributing to a wave of women-led farmhouse cheesemaking in the UK alongside figures such as Veronica Steele and Giana Ferguson. Her cheeses included Little Rydings and Emlett, which were eventually stocked by Harrods.

Following her husband's death in 2002, Holbrook divided her time between Somerset and London, delivering cheese to Neal's Yard Dairy and supplying meat and cheese to London restaurants such as Lyle's. She remained actively involved in overseeing her products at Neal’s Yard Dairy.
