= Enrique Carbó, Argentina =

Coordinates: 33°08′S 59°14′W

Enrique Carbó
- Municipality and village
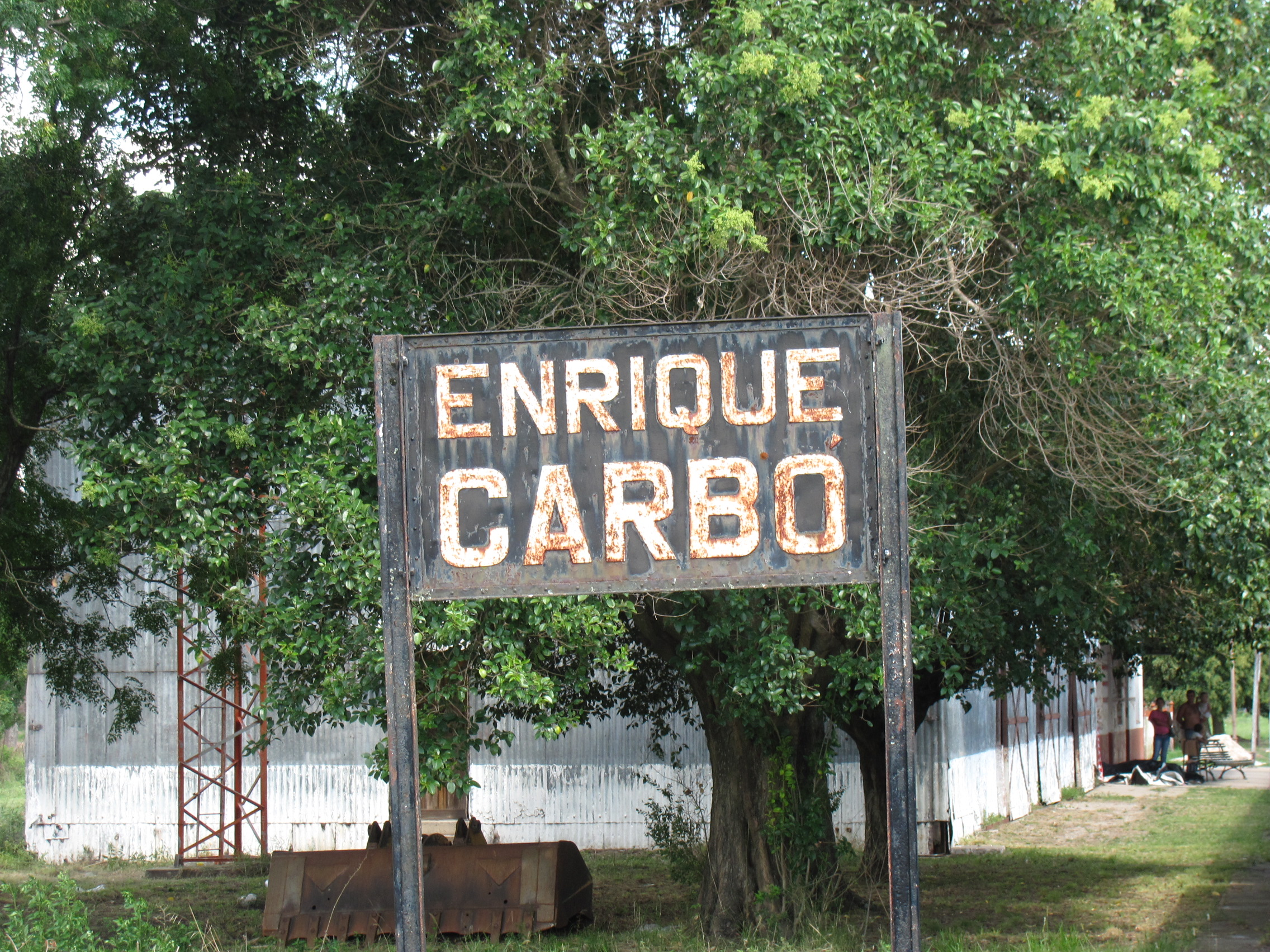
- Interactive map of Enrique Carbó
- Country: Argentina
- Province: Entre Ríos Province
- Time zone: UTC−3 (ART)

Enrique Carbó is a village and municipality in Entre Ríos Province in north-eastern Argentina.
