= Pat DeCaro =

American artist

Pat DeCaro (1951-2025) was an American artist based in Seattle, Washington. She lived in the Pacific Northwest after 1980, where her works are held in the collections of the Northwest Museum of Art, the Washington State Arts Commission, the Seattle Office of Arts and Culture, and the Pilchuck Glass School. DeCaro’s work has been exhibited in numerous solo and group shows in the United States and Europe. She received the 2012 Twining Humber Award for lifetime achievement in the arts.

== Life ==
DeCaro was born in Philadelphia, where she attended the Fleischer Memorial Art School and received recognition in the Gimbels City-wide Young Artists Exhibit at the age of sixteen. She studied art at Temple University and Tyler School of Art, both in Philadelphia, and moved to Seattle to take a Masters in Fine Arts at the University of Washington. DeCaro received a Fulbright Fellowship to Italy, and spent two years there before returning to Seattle, where she lives and maintains a studio.

DeCaro died at the age of 73 in Seattle, on April 6, 2025.

== Career ==
DeCaro showed her work regularly at the Francine Seders Gallery in Seattle from 1990 until the gallery closed in 2013. She has had solo exhibits of her paintings and drawings in Dusseldorf, Paris, and Milan, and has exhibited a co-created video in Istanbul. She has been an artist-in-residence at the MacDowell Colony, Ragdale, Ateliers Höherweg, the Brandywine Workshop, and held a Hauberg Fellowship residency at Pilchuck Glass School. In the Pacific Northwest, she has also exhibited her work at the Port Angeles Fine Arts Center and the Northwest Museum of Art, and had a solo exhibit at Gallery 4Culture in Seattle in 2016.

== Awards ==
- 2012 John and Yvonne Twining Humber Award for Lifetime Achievement in the Arts, Artist Trust, Seattle
- 2009 John Hauberg Fellowship, Artist Residency, Pilchuck Glass School
- 2005 Ateliers Höherwegs, Artist-in-residence, Dusseldorf, Germany
- 2002 Seattle Arts Commission, Purchase Award
- 2001 Barbara Deming Memorial Fund
- 1993 Brandywine Visiting Artist Fellowship, Philadelphia, PA
- 1987 Washington State Arts Commission, Painting Commission
- 1983-84 Fulbright-Hays Fellowship in Painting, Italy
- 1982/1994 MacDowell Colony Artist Residency, Peterborough, NH
- 1981 Ford Foundation Grant, University of Washington
