= Sangria Señorial =

Mexican Soft Drink

- The logo of sangria Señorial
- Manufacturer: Mezgo
- Origin: Mexico
- Introduced: 1960; 65 years ago
- Related products: Chaparritas El Naranjo; Barrilitos; Trébol

Sangría Señorial is a sangria-flavored, non-alcoholic beverage produced by Mezgo S.A de C.V in Mexico since 1960.

== Description ==
It is made with wine grapes, essence of lemon, cane sugar, and carbonated water. It has been distributed in the United States by Novamex, the producers of Jarritos soft drinks, since 1982.
