= Carlo Santi =

Italian Formula One engineer

- Born: 15 February 1974 (age 52); Verona, Italy
- Occupation: Engineer
- Employer: Scuderia Ferrari
- Known for: Formula One engineer
- Title: Head of remote engineering

Carlo Santi (born 15 February 1974) is an Italian Formula One engineer. He is currently the head of remote engineering for the Scuderia Ferrari, Formula One team. He is also serving as the race engineer for Lewis Hamilton.

== Career ==
Santi studied mechanical engineering at the Politecnico di Milano, specialising in vehicle engineering and dynamics. Following his graduation, he undertook a scholarship-supported project at the FIAT Research Centre in Turin, before working in the companies vehicle dynamics department. He joined Scuderia Ferrari as a vehicle modelling engineer working on the team's first driver in loop simulator project.

In 2016, Santi became performance engineer to Kimi Räikkönen, working closely with the Finn during the 2016 and 2017 seasons. For the 2018 season, Santi was promoted to Räikkönen’s race engineer as part of a wider engineering reshuffle at Ferrari. The pairing culminated in Räikkönen’s final Formula One victory at the 2018 United States Grand Prix.

From the 2019 season, Santi moved into a leadership role within Ferrari’s “remote garage”, providing live operational support from Maranello to race and performance engineers during Grand Prix weekends, while also contributing to longer-term performance development activities. In 2026, Santi was appointed race engineer to Lewis Hamilton following the reassignment of Riccardo Adami to oversee the Ferrari Driver Academy. On 14 June 2026, Santi and Hamilton celebrated their first win together (and Hamilton’s maiden victory with Ferrari) at the 2026 Barcelona-Catalunya Grand Prix.
