= De Carlo =

De Carlo is a surname derived from the personal name Karl / Carl. Notable people with the surname include:

- Andrea De Carlo (born 1952), Italian writer
- Antonio De Carlo (born 1967), Mexican actor
- Giancarlo De Carlo (1919–2005), Italian architect
- Lapo De Carlo (born 1968), Italian sports journalist and presenter
- Luca De Carlo (born 1972), Italian politician
- Massimo De Carlo (1919–2005), Italian art dealer
- Yvonne De Carlo (1922–2007), Canadian actress

== See also ==
- De Carle
- de Carli
- DeCarlo
- Di Carlo
- John Del Carlo
- Sergio De Karlo
