= Carbazole 1,9a-dioxygenase =

Enzyme

Identifiers
- EC no.: 1.14.12.22

Databases
- IntEnz: IntEnz view
- BRENDA: BRENDA entry
- ExPASy: NiceZyme view
- KEGG: KEGG entry
- MetaCyc: metabolic pathway
- PRIAM: profile
- PDB structures: RCSB PDB PDBe PDBsum
Search
- PMC: articles
- PubMed: articles
- NCBI: proteins

Carbazole 1,9a-dioxygenase (EC 1.14.12.22, CARDO) is an enzyme with systematic name 9H-carbazole,NAD(P)H:oxygen oxidoreductase (2,3-hydroxylating). This enzyme catalyses the following chemical reaction

carbazole
+ NADH
O_{2} + H^{+}
2'-aminobiphenyl-2,3-diol
+ NAD^{+}

The four substrates of the enzyme are carbazole, reduced nicotinamide adenine dinucleotide (NADH), oxygen, and a proton. Its products are 2'-aminobiphenyl-2,3-diol and oxidised NAD^{+}. It is an oxidoreductase that uses molecular oxygen as oxidant and incorporates both its atoms into the starting material. It catalyses the first reaction in the pathway of carbazole degradation.
