= Carmo Church (Braga) =

Church in Braga, Portugal

Coordinates: 41.5540°N 8.4258°W

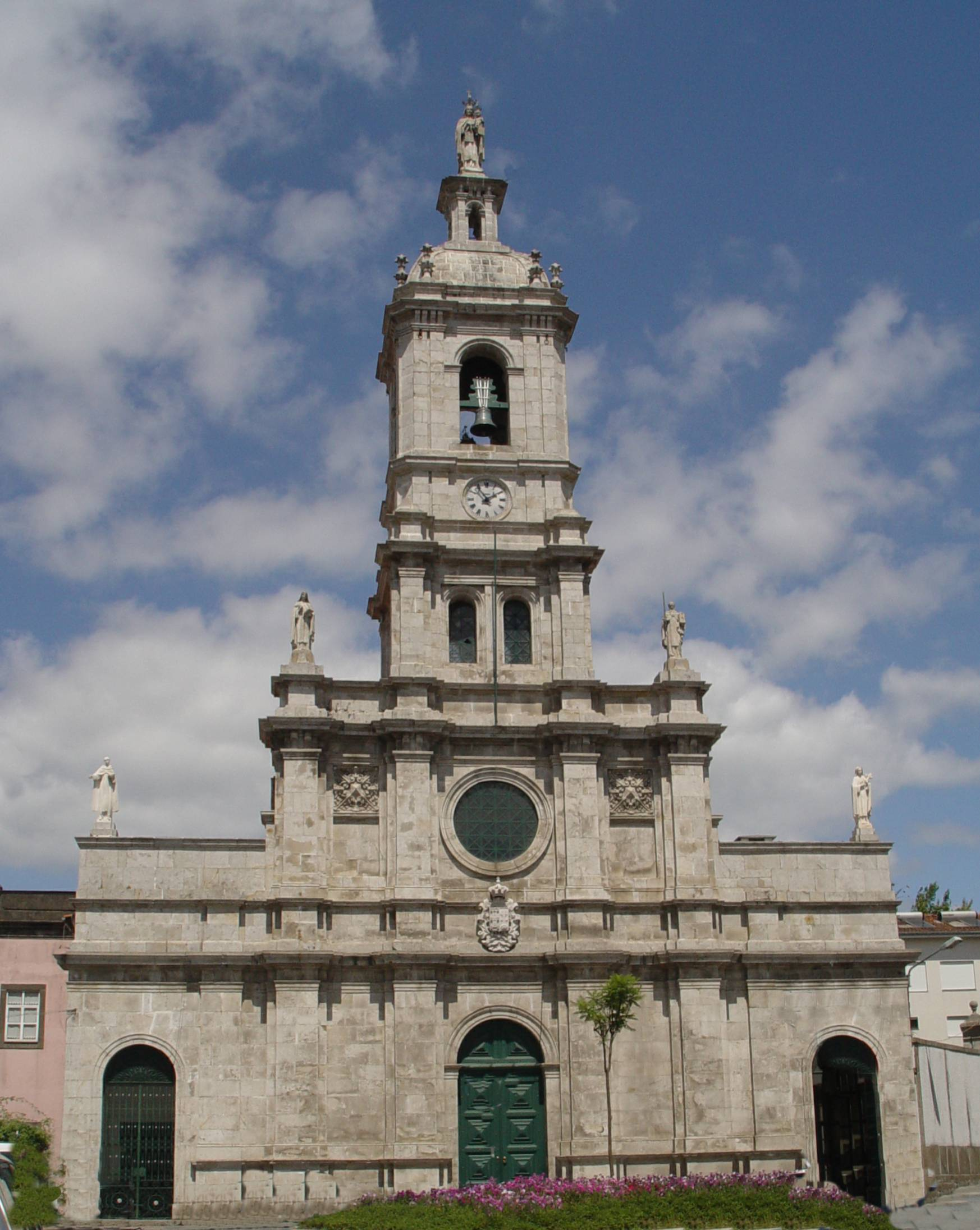
Carmo Church-Braga

The Carmo Church in Portuguese, Igreja do Carmo is a Portuguese 17th-century church in Braga, Portugal, with a Latin cross Floor plan and a single nave.

The church is part of the Carmelite Convent, founded in 1653.

The main façade (from 1911) follows the plan of the tower façade, and the interior decoration features baroque golden woodwork retables and neoclassical retables and tiles.
