= Cargo Records =

Cargo Records may refer to one of three distinct record labels, all of which were once divisions of the same company:

- Cargo Records (Canada), a defunct record label and distributor in Canada
- Cargo Records (UK), an active record label in the United Kingdom and Europe
- Cargo Music, an active record label in the United States
