= Carlo Petrini (scientist) =

Italian scientist

Carlo Maria Petrini
- Born: November 6, 1965 (age 60); Turin, Italy
- Education: University of Turin
- Awards: Knight of the Order of Merit of the Italian Republic
- Scientific career
- Fields: Bioethics; Public Health
- Workplaces: Italian National Institute of Health
- Website: www.carlopetrini.eu

Carlo Maria Petrini (Turin, Italy, 6 November 1965) is an Italian scientist and bio-ethicist. In June 2026, he was awarded Knight of the Order of Merit of the Italian Republic.

He is Director of the Bioethics Unit (Unità di Bioetica) and Chair of the National Ethics Committee for clinical trials of Public Research Bodies (EPR) and other Public Bodies at the national level (CEN-NEC) at the Italian National Institute of Health (Istituto Superiore di Sanità, ISS), as well as the President of the National Coordination Center of Ethics Committees (''Centro di Coordinamento Nazionale dei Comitati Etici Territoriali'') under decrees issued by the Italian Ministry of Health on 19 April 2018, 27 May 2021 and 23 September 2024. He also serves as a Corresponding Member of the Pontifical Academy for Life.

His work focuses on advancing bioethical standards in scientific research, with particular attention to the ethical implications of medical advancements, clinical trials, and data handling.

== Biography ==
Petrini studied at the University of Turin where he graduated in 1988 with a degree in Biological Sciences. The year after, he began at the Istituto Superiore di Sanità (ISS) where he developed an interest in problems tied to ethics in scientific research, in particular in biomedical ethics.

In 2007 he became Director of the Bioethics Unit at ISS.

The President of the Council of Ministers appointed Carlo Petrini as a member of the National Bioethics Committee.

== Works ==
Petrini is author of several hundred publications, most of which in internationally rated scientific journals and several of which have been awarded prizes. His book "Bioethics, environment, risk" won the International Peccei Prize. His book "Bioetica nella sanita" ("Bioethics in health care") is composed of articles originally published in L'Osservatore Romano, the newspaper of the Holy See.

== Views ==
=== Ethical Principles in Bioethical Research ===
He has emphasized the importance of adhering to key ethical and scientific principles in bioethical research; he argues that two primary pillars, value and validity, should always guide bioethical research. "Value" pertains to ensuring that research contributes to improvements in health and knowledge, while "validity" stresses the importance of methodological rigor.

=== Impact of the COVID-19 Pandemic ===
The COVID-19 pandemic has, according to Petrini, introduced both ethical and procedural challenges and has expressed cautious optimism about this accelerated pace, emphasizing that while swift approvals can be beneficial, they must not compromise the rigorous scientific standards that are essential for maintaining public trust and ethical integrity.

=== Euthanasia ===
Petrini considers euthanasia and medical assistance in dying to be incompatible with medical ethics. Petrini noted that in Europe, the Principles of Medical Ethics stress respect for life and patient autonomy, but in terminal cases, doctors should focus on alleviating suffering and preserving dignity. In Italy, both medical and nursing codes recognize the importance of the conscience clause, and Petrini argued that, like laws on abortion and animal testing, euthanasia legislation must allow for conscientious objection.
