= Manuel Carmo =

Portuguese artist and author

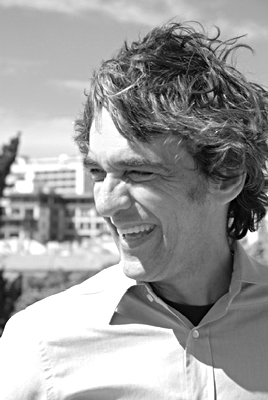
Manuel Carmo

Jorge Manuel do Carmo Pereira de Almeida (1958–2015) was a Portuguese artist and author known for his contemporary works.

Born in Lisbon, Portugal, Manuel Carmo practised as a lawyer before beginning to study art in the early 1980s at Ar.Co, Lisbon and since then devoted himself exclusively to painting, sculpture and writing. His life and work were the subject for a 30 min documentary, in 2005, produced by the Portuguese Public Television Channel RTP1 in collaboration with Universidade Aberta, and broadcast through RTP International channel.
