= Quima Jaume i Carbo =

Catalan Spanish poet

Quima Jaume i Carbó (1934–1993) was a Catalan Spanish poet. She was born in Cadaqués, Girona, Catalonia, and graduated from university with a degree in Catalan philology.

Quima Jaume i Carbó was influenced by fellow female poets Marta Pessarrodona and Rosa Leveroni, and the main theme of her poetry was love. Prominent in feminist and literary associations, she died in Barcelona. She was the author of Pels camins remolosos de la mar (1990) and the collection of verses, El temps passa a Cadaqués (Time Passes in Cadaqués) (1988).
