= Cargo cult (disambiguation) =

A cargo cult is a Melanesian new religious movement.

Cargo cult may also refer to:

- Cargo cult programming, a style of computer programming characterized by the ritual inclusion of code or program structures that serve no real purpose
- Cargo cult science, a term coined by Richard Feynman to describe something that appears to be science but lacks the scientific method
- Cargo Cult (musician), a Slovak electronic musician
- Cargo Cult Press, an American book publisher
- "Cargo Culte," a song by Serge Gainsbourg from the 1971 album Histoire de Melody Nelson
