= Calor River =

Calor is the Latin name of two Italian rivers:

- The Calore Irpino (or Calore Beneventano), a tributary of the Volturno
- The Calore Lucano (or Calore Salernitano), a tributary of the Sele
