= Calò (surname) =

Calò is an Italian surname. Notable people with the surname include:

- Carla Calò (1926–2019), Italian actress
- Eugenio Calò (1906–1944), Italian national hero
- Francesco Calò, Italian painter
- Giacomo Calò (born 1997), Italian footballer
- Giuseppe Calò (born 1931), Sicilian Mafioso
- Monica Calò (died 1998), Italian murder victim
- Romano Calò (1883–1952), Italian actor

== See also ==
- Caloy
- Carlo (name)
