= Arturo Mundet =

Catalan businessman

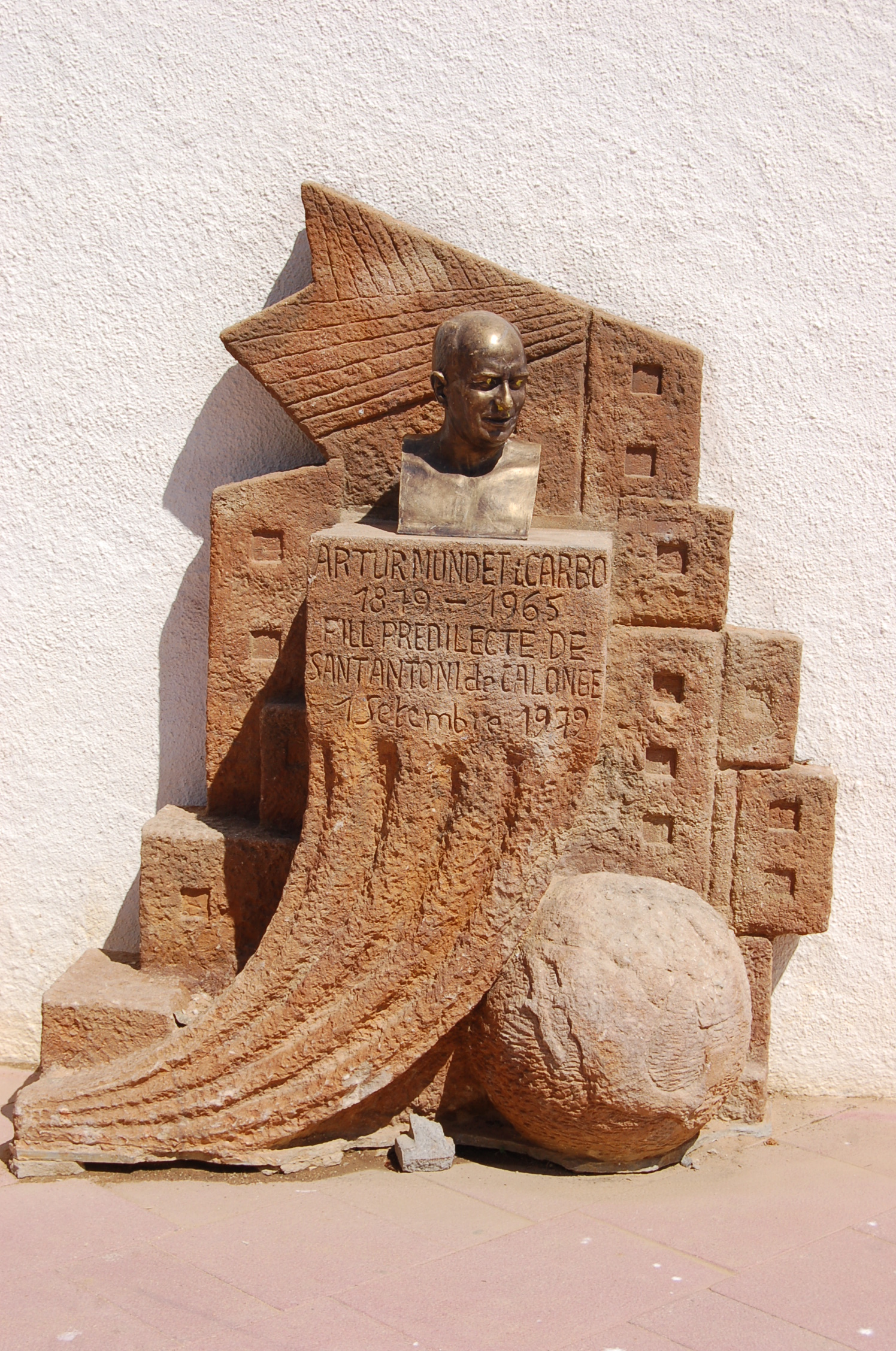
Monument to Artur Mundet in Sant Antoni de Calonge

Arturo Mundet Carbó (Catalan: Artur Mundet i Carbó, IPA: [ərˈtur munˈdɛt i kaɾˈβo]; Sant Antoni de Calonge, 8 April 1879 – Mexico City, 4 July 1965) was a Catalan businessman based in Mexico.

Mundet came from a family of Catalan cork manufacturers and learned the trade as a child. He first travelled to Mexico to establish a branch of the company business there.

In 1902, Mundet created the Sidral Mundet apple flavoured soft drink, which was destined to become popular in the Mexican market and beyond.

He was also known for his philanthropic work, including the creation of the Recinte Mundet in Barcelona and the Germandat de Sant Antoni de Calonge in his place of birth. The Parque Arturo Mundet in Mexico City bears his name, as does the Casa Hogar para Ancianos Arturo Mundet, an old people's home in the same city.
