= Carlo Pietzner =

Austrian-American artist (1915–1986)

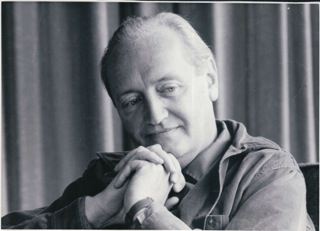
Carlo Pietzner

Carlo Pietzner (1915 – 17 April 1986) was a co-founder of Camphill, artist, anthroposophist, and a special needs and adult educator.

== Biography ==
Pietzner was born in Vienna in 1915. He spent his youth in that city in the years between the two wars and completed his art studies at the Kunstgewerbschule, (today the University of Applied Arts Vienna), meeting there, amongst others Robert Musil and Oskar Kokoshka. His family ran a photographic studio, which his sister later took over. Through his friend Peter Roth he was introduced to Dr Karl König and joined the youth group that had gathered around him. This group met for the last time in Vienna on March 11, 1938, at the time of the Nazi occupation. The members left Austria along various routes to come together again in Aberdeen and found Camphill. Carlo arrived there in 1941 and was shortly thereafter interned in Canada. He became the Principal of Heachcot School that cared for about 50 severely disabled individuals and already there pioneered a color and light therapy that he later developed together with Edmund Pracht.

In 1954 he was asked to start the Camphill work in Glencraig, Northern Ireland, becoming increasingly involved in the training and administrative work of the international Camphill movement. In 1961 he moved to the United States with his family and a small group of co-workers to lead the expansion of Camphill on that continent beginning with Camphill Village Copake. In 1963 he helped found Camphill Beaver Run focusing his attention on community development work, artistic activity and lecturing.

Besides his work in Camphill, he was active in building up the local and international work of the Anthroposophical Society, serving on its American Council in the 1960s and again between 1981-1983 and supporting the founding of the Section for Curative Education and Social Therapy in Dornach, Switzerland within the Medical Section of the School of Spiritual Science.

In the 1970s Carlo initiated art retreats for Camphill coworkers, wrote and directed plays to develop the cultural life of the communities, wrote books and poetry, produced a large number of paintings and sketches and took on stained glass commissions for Camphill Halls in Germany, Switzerland, Norway and other countries. He provided architectural guidance for many buildings and concerned himself with the artistic and innovative formation of social and community life in Camphill.

Under his leadership the Camphill Association of North America was formed in 1983, which he directed until his death in 1986. He had already begun to withdraw from active involvement in Copake, making way for a younger generation of leaders. His lecturing and training activities continued amongst a growing circle of friends and acquaintances all over the world.

== Published work ==
- Questions of Destiny: Mental Retardation and Curative Education Rudolph Steiner Press (July 1, 1988) ISBN 978-0880102643
- Inner Development and the Landscape of the Ego Steiner Books (October 1995) ISBN 978-0880103831
- Transforming Earth, Transforming Self Rudolph Steiner Press (December 1996) ISBN 978-0880104289
- Festival Images for Today Steiner Books (August 2008) ISBN 978-0880103763
- Who was Kaspar Hauser?: An Essay and a Play Steiner Press (June 1, 1990) ISBN 978-0903540629
- Village Life: The Camphill Communities Edited by Carlo Pietzner, Cornelius Pietzner and Wanda Root Simon & Schuster (Juv) (January 1987) ISBN 978-0887080302
- The Lonely Generation and the Search for Truth Rudolf Steiner Information Center (1968) ASIN B002S7LTMQ
- The Christian Rosenkreutz Anthology Garber Books (Oct. 1 2000) ASIN B00BMRH526
