= Carly =

Carly is a given name, a feminine form of Carl. It is also a pet form of given names such as Carla, Caroline, Charlotte and Carlotta . Variant different spellings include Carley, Carlie, Carlee, Carleigh and Carli, as well as Karly, Karli, Karley, Karlee, Karlie and Karleigh.

The name became popular in large part, if not primarily, because of the success of Carly Simon's music in the 1970s – its first appearance in the top 1000 US baby names was in 1973, soon after her first success. It was most popular in the UK, Canada and Australia in the 1980s and in the United States during the 1990s. Over 2,000 American baby girls were named Carly each year between 1991 and 1998.

Carly and its variants may refer to:

== People ==
- Carly Binding (born 1978), New Zealand pop singer-songwriter
- Carly Booth (born 1992), Scottish professional golfer
- Carly Chaikin (born 1990), American actress
- Carly Cole (born 1984), British reality television contestant, fitness trainer and model
- Carly Colón (born 1979), male Puerto Rican-Canadian professional wrestler
- Carly Craig (born 1980), American actress
- Carly Dixon (born 1973), Australian Olympic judoka
- Carly Ealey, American artist best known for mural installations
- Carly Fiorina (born 1954), American business executive and politician
- Carly Flynn, New Zealand journalist and television presenter
- Carly Foulkes (born 1988), Canadian model and actress
- Carly Gullickson (born 1986), American professional tennis player
- Carly Hibberd (1985–2011), Australian road cyclist
- Carly Hillman (born 1983), British actress
- Carly Hunt (born 1981), English footballer
- Carly Janiga (born 1988), American gymnast
- Carly Rae Jepsen (born 1985), Canadian recording artist and singer-songwriter
- Carly McKillip (born 1989), Canadian actress and musician
- Carly Melin (born 1985), American politician
- Carly Milne, Canadian writer
- Carly Paradis (born 1980), Canadian composer and pianist
- Carly Patterson (born 1988), American gymnast and singer
- Carly Pearce (born 1990), American country music singer and songwriter
- Carly Piper (born 1983), American Olympic swimmer
- Carly Pope (born 1980), Canadian actress
- Carly Ryan (1992–2007), Australian female murder victim
- Carly Schroeder (born 1990), German-American film and television actress
- Carly Simon (born 1943), American singer-songwriter, musician, and children's author
- Carly Skelly (born 1986), English professional boxer
- Carly Smithson (born 1983), Irish American soul / pop rock singer-songwriter and actress
- Carly Rose Sonenclar (born 1999), American singer, songwriter, and child actress
- Carly Telford (born 1987), English international football goalkeeper
- Carly Wilson (born 1982), Australian basketball player

== Pseudonyms ==
- "Carly Phillips", pen name of American novelist Karen Drogin (born 1965)

== Fictional characters ==
- Carly Cardinal, mascot for the National Arbor Day Foundation
- Carly Corinthos, on the American soap opera General Hospital
- Carly Manning, on the American soap opera Days of Our Lives
- Carly Morris, on the Australian soap opera Home and Away
- Carly Shay, on the Nickelodeon series iCarly and its revival series of the same name
- Carly Snyder, on the American soap opera As the World Turns
- Carly Wicks, on the BBC soap opera EastEnders
- Carly Witwicky, in the Transformers franchise
- Carly Norris, on the film Sliver

== See also ==
- Carle (disambiguation)
- Carley (disambiguation)
- Carlye J. Hughes
- Carli (given name)
- Carry (name)
- Charly (name)
- Kali (disambiguation)
- Karly
