= Charles =

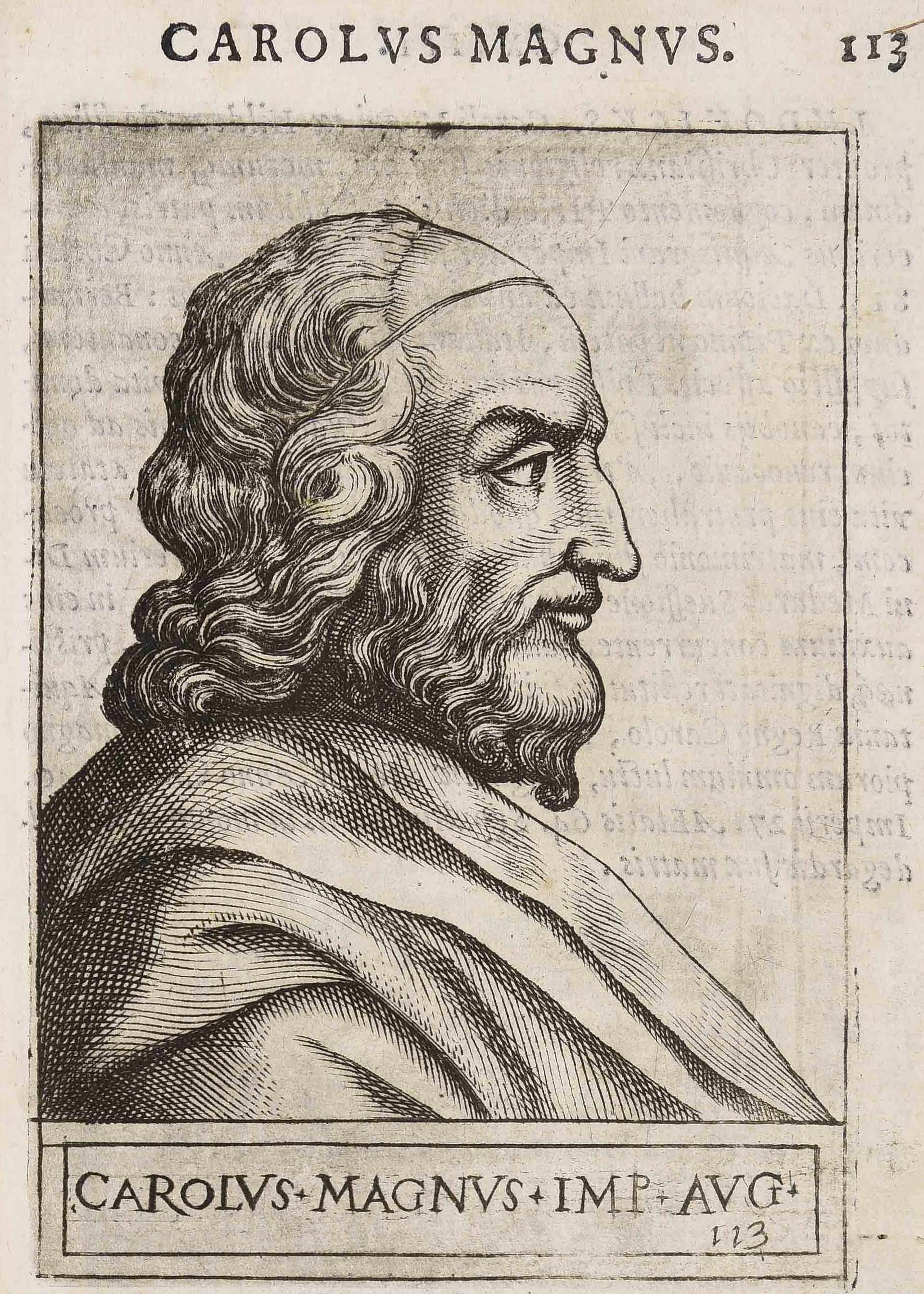
- King Charlemagne (742–814) of the Franks
- Pronunciation: /tʃɑːrlz/ French: [ʃaʁl]
- Gender: Male
- Name day: November 4

Origin
- Origin: French, from Germanic
- Meaning: "Free man"

Other names
- Variant forms: Carl, Karl, Carlo, Carlos, Carolus
- Related names: Caroline, Charlotte, Charlene

Charles is a male given name predominantly found in English and French speaking countries. It is from the French form Charles of the Proto-Germanic name ᚲᚨᚱᛁᛚᚨᛉ (in runic alphabet) or *karilaz (in Latin alphabet), whose meaning was "free man". The Old English descendant of this word was Ċearl or Ċeorl, as the name of King Cearl of Mercia, that disappeared after the Norman conquest of England.

The name was notably borne by Charlemagne (Charles the Great), and was at the time Latinized as Karolus (as in Vita Karoli Magni), later also as Carolus.

== Etymology ==
The name's etymology is a Common Germanic noun *karilaz meaning "free man", which survives in English as churl (< Old English ċeorl), which developed its deprecating sense in the Middle English period.

Some Germanic languages, for example Dutch and German, have retained the word in two separate senses. In the particular case of Dutch, Karel refers to the given name, whereas the noun kerel means "a bloke, fellow, man".

In the form Charles, the initial spelling ch- corresponds to the palatalization of the Latin group ca- to [tʃa] in Central Old French (Francien) and the final -s to the former subjective case (cas sujet) of masculine names in Old French like in Giles or James (< Latin -us, see Spanish/ Portuguese Carlos).

According to Julius Pokorny, the historical linguist and Indo-Europeanist, the root meaning of Charles is "old man", from Indo-European *ĝer-, where the ĝ is a palatal consonant, meaning "to rub; to be old; grain." An old man has been worn away and is now grey with age.

In some Slavic languages, the name Drago (and variants: Dragomir, Dragoslav, etc., all based on the root drag 'dear') has been used as an equivalent for Charles (Karel, etc.). This is based on the false etymology deriving Carl from Latin carus 'dear'. Examples are the Slovene politician Karl Deschmann (1821–1889), also known as Dragotin Dežman, and the Slovene historian Dragotin Lončar (1876–1954), baptized Carl.

== History ==
=== Early Middle Ages ===
The name is atypical for Germanic names as it is not composed of two elements, but simply a noun meaning "(free) man". This meaning of ceorl contrasts with eorl (Old Norse jarl) "nobleman" on one hand and with þeow (Old Norse þræll) "bondsman, slave" on the other. As such it would not seem a likely candidate for the name of a Germanic king, but it is attested as such with Cearl of Mercia (fl. 620), the first Mercian king mentioned by Bede in his Historia ecclesiastica gentis Anglorum. It is a peculiarity of the Anglo-Saxon royal names that many of the rulers of the earliest period (6th to 7th centuries) have monothematic (simplex) names, while the standard dithematic names become almost universal from the 8th century. Compare the name of King Mul of Kent (7th century) which simply translates to "mule".

Charles Martel, the son of Pepin of Herstal and Alpaida, was either illegitimate or the product of a bigamous marriage, and therefore indeed a "free man", but not of noble rank. After his victory at the Battle of Soissons (718), Charles Martel styled himself Duke of the Franks. Charles' eldest son was named Carloman (c. 710 – 754), a rare example of the element carl- occurring in a compound name. The Chronicle of Fredegar names an earlier Carloman as the father of Pepin of Landen, and thus the great-great-grandfather of the Charles Martel. This would place the name Carloman in the 6th century, and open the possibility that the Frankish name Carl may originate as a short form of Carloman. The only other compound name with the Carl- prefix is Carlofred (Carlefred), attested in the 7th century; as a suffix, it occurs in the rare names Altcarl and Gundecarl (9th and 11th centuries, respectively).

Charlemagne (742–814) was Charles Martel's grandson. After Charlemagne's reign, the name became irrevocably connected with him and his Carolingian dynasty. After Charlemagne, the name Charles (Karol) became even the standard word for "king" in Slavic (Czech and Slovak král, Polish król; South Slavic kral крал, krȃlj краљ; Russian король), Baltic (Latvian karalis, Lithuanian karalius) and Hungarian (király).

Charlemagne's son Charles the Younger died without issue, but the name resurfaces repeatedly within the 9th-century Carolingian family tree, so with Charles the Bald (823–877), Charles the Fat (839–888) Charles of Provence (845–863), Charles the Child (847/848–866) and Charles the Simple (879–929).

=== Later Middle Ages and Early Modern history ===
The name survives into the High Middle Ages (Charles, Duke of Lower Lorraine; Charles, Count of Valois; Charles I, Count of Flanders (Charles the Good, beatified in 1882); Charles I of Naples; Charles I of Hungary). Karl Sverkersson was a king of Sweden in the 12th century, counted as "Charles VII" due to a genealogical fiction of the 17th century by Charles "IX", but actually the first king of Sweden with this name.

Charles resurfaces as a royal name in Germany with Charles IV, Holy Roman Emperor (1316–1378, counted as "the fourth" after Charlemagne, Charles the Bald and Charles the Fat) and in France with Charles IV of France (1294–1328, "the fourth" after Charlemagne, Charles the Bald and Charles the Simple), and becomes comparatively widespread in the Late Middle Ages (Charles I, Duke of Savoy, Charles III, Duke of Savoy).

Charles V, Holy Roman Emperor (1500–1558) gives rise to a tradition of Charlses in Habsburg Spain (Charles VI, Holy Roman Emperor, Charles II of Spain, Charles III of Spain, Charles IV of Spain).

The numbering scheme for the kings of Sweden was continued in modern times with Charles X Gustav, Charles XI, Charles XII, Charles XIII, Charles XIV John and Charles XV.

Charles I of England (1600–1649) is followed by Charles II of England (1630–1685). The Province of Carolina is named during the rule of Charles II, after Charles I.

Charles III Philip, Elector Palatine (1661–1742).

=== Modern history ===
Carlism is a political movement in Spain seeking the establishment of a separate line of the Bourbon family on the Spanish throne. This line descended from Infante Carlos, Count of Molina (1788–1855), and was founded due to dispute over the succession laws and widespread dissatisfaction with the Alfonsine line of the House of Bourbon. The movement was at its strongest in the 1830s, causing the Carlist Wars, and had a revival following Spain's defeat in the Spanish–American War in 1898, and lasted until the end of the Franco regime in 1975 as a social and political force

Charles Floyd (1782–1804) was the only casualty in the Lewis and Clark Expedition. Charles DeRudio (1832–1910) was an Italian aristocrat, would-be assassin of Napoleon III, and later a career U.S. Army officer who fought in the 7th U.S. Cavalry at the Battle of the Little Bighorn. Charles Albert Varnum (1849–1936) was the commander of the scouts in the Little Bighorn Campaign and received the Medal of Honor for his actions in a conflict following the Battle of Wounded Knee. "Lonesome" Charley Reynolds (1842–1876) was a scout in the U.S. 7th Cavalry Regiment who was killed at the Battle of the Little Bighorn.

Carl has been a very popular male given name in the United States during the late 19th to early 20th centuries, consistently ranking in the top 30 male given names in the US from 1887 to 1938, and remaining among the top 100 until the 1980s, but since declining below rank 500. Charles has always been among the top 100 names in the U.S. since records started in 1880. In addition, it is among the top 100 names given in England and Wales; the current King of the United Kingdom and the other Commonwealth realms, Charles III, is a notable bearer of the name. In 2022, it was the 26th most popular name given to boys in Canada.

== Derived feminine names ==
Caroline and Charlotte are feminine given names derived from Carl.

Charlotte is late medieval, e.g. Charlotte of Savoy (1441–1483), Charlotte of Cyprus (1444–1487). It was introduced to Britain in the 17th century, and gave rise to hypocorisms such as Lottie, Tottie, Totty.

Caroline is early modern, e.g. Caroline of Ansbach (1683–1737). It has given rise to numerous variations, such as Carlyn, Carolina, Carolyn, Karolyn, Carolin, Karolina, Karoline, Karolina, Carolien, as well as hypocorisms, such as Callie, Carol, Carrie, etc.

Another derived feminine name is Carla (Bulgarian, Catalan, Dutch, English, German, Italian, Portuguese, Spanish), a name which dates from early Italy.

Regional forms:

  - Carolina (Italian, Indonesian, Portuguese, Spanish, Swedish, Bulgarian)
  - Caroline (English, French, Indonesian, Swedish, Danish, Dutch)
  - Carolyn (English)
  - Carlijn (Dutch)
  - Karoliina (Finnish)
  - Karolina (Bulgarian, Indonesian, Polish, Swedish)
  - Karolína (Czech)
  - Karoline (Danish, Indonesian, Norwegian, Swedish)
  - Karolina (Каролина) (Russian)
  - Keraleyn (קעראַליין) (Yiddish)
  - Carly (American)
  - Carol (English)
- Carola (German, Swedish)
  - Carole (English, French, Portuguese)
  - Karol (קאַראָל) (Yiddish)
  - Kyārōla (क्यारोल) (Nepali)
  - Kerol (Керол) (Serbian), (Russian)
- Charlotte (English, French, German, Swedish, Danish, Dutch)
  - Carlota (Spanish, Portuguese, Catalan)
  - Carlotta (Italian)
  - Charlotta (Swedish)
- Carla
  - Charla (English)
  - Karla (Bulgarian, German, Indonesian, Scandinavian, Serbian, Czech, Croatian)
  - Карла (Bulgarian, Russian, Serbian)
- Charlene (given name), Charlène

== Regional forms of the name ==
Language	Formal name	Informal name
Armenian	Կարլոս (Karlos)	
Basque	Karlos	
Bulgarian	Карл (Karl)	
Belarusian	Чарльз (Čarĺz)	
Catalan	Carles	
Chinese	查尔斯 (simplified), 查爾斯 (traditional) (Chá'ěrsī)	
Croatian	Karlo	
Czech	Karel	
Danish	Karl, Carl	
Dutch	Karel	
English	Charles	Charlie/Charley, Chuck, Chucky, Chaz/Chas, Chad, Chip
Estonian	Kaarel, Kaarli, Kaaro, Kalle	
Faroese	Karl	
Finnish	Kaarlo, Kaarle, Kalle, Karl	
French	Charles	Charlot
German	Karl, Carl	
Georgian	კარლო (Karlo)	
Greek	Κάρολος (Károlos)	
Hungarian	Károly	Karcsi
Hawaiian	Kale	
Icelandic	Karl	
Indonesian	Charles, Carolus	
Irish	Carlus, Séarlas, Cathal	
Italian	Carlo	
Japanese	チャールズ (Chāruzu)	
Korean	찰스 (chalseu)	
Latin	Carolus	
Latvian	Kārlis	
Limburgish	Sjarel	
Lithuanian	Karolis	
Norwegian	Karl, Carl	
Polish	Karol	
Portuguese	Carlos	Carlinhos
Romanian	Carol	
Russian	Карл (Karl)	
Scottish Gaelic	Teàrlach	
Serbian	Карло (Karlo)	
Slovak	Karol	
Slovene	Karel	
Spanish	Carlos	Carlito, Carlitos, Caloy (Philippines)
Swedish	Karl, Carl, Kalle	
Welsh	Siarl	

== List of notable people ==
=== Media, arts and entertainment ===
In literature

Name	Description
Charles Abreu	Cuban composer and pianist
Charles Baudelaire	French poet
Charles Brandt	American investigator and writer (1942–2024)
Charles Bukowski	American poet and novelist
Charles Dickens	English novelist
Charles Dodgson (pen-name Lewis Carroll)	English clergyman, writer and mathematician
Charles Dyer (playwright)	English playwright, actor and screenwriter
Charles Edwards	Canadian journalist and news agency executive
Charles Henri Ford	American poet, photographer and writer
Charles Fort	American writer and researcher into anomalous phenomena
Charles L. Grant	American science-fiction author
Charles Roger Hargreaves	Children's author who wrote the Mr. Men and Little Miss series.
Charles "Sis Doc" Richardson	American newspaper editor, founder of Chi Omega
Charles Lewinsky	Swiss screenwriter, dramatist and playwright
Charles Lummis	American journalist, poet, historian; founder of the Southwest Museum
Charles Mayer	Canadian journalist, sportsperson and politician
Charles Olson	American poet
Charles O'Rear	American photographer known for taking Bliss
Charles Jacobs Peterson	American author, editor and publisher
Charles G.D. Roberts	Canadian poet
Charles Webb (author)	American author of The Graduate

In music

Name	Description
Charles Aznavour	French-Armenian singer
Chuck Berry	American guitarist, singer, and composer
Charlie Daniels	American country music figure
Charles Gavin	Brazilian rock drummer/producer
Charlie Haden	American Jazz bassist and composer
Charles Ives	American composer
Charles Kelley	Vocalist and founding member of the country music trio Lady A
Charles Lloyd	American jazz musician
Chuck Mangione	American jazz artist
Charles Mingus	American Jazz bassist and composer
Charles E. Moody	American gospel songwriter and performer
Charlie Parker	American Jazz saxophonist
Charlie Simpson	British musician and singer
Charles Davis Tillman (1861–1943)	pioneer of southern gospel music
Charlie Watts	English drummer for the rock group The Rolling Stones

In film

Name	Description
Charles Bowers	American cartoonist and early filmmaker
Charles Boyer	French-American actor
Charles Bronson	American actor
Sebastian Cabot (born Charles Sebastian Thomas Cabot)	English actor
Charlie Chaplin	English comedy actor, famous for silent film acting
Charley Chase	American silent film comedian and writer
Charles Dance	English actor
Charles Durning	American actor
Charles Gray	English actor
Charles Grodin	American actor and cable talk show host
Charles Herbert	American child actor of the '50s and '60s
Charlton Heston (born John Charles Carter)	American actor
Lionel Jeffries (born Lionel Charles Jeffries)	English actor
Charles Laughton	English actor
Chas Licciardello	Australian comedian and a member of The Chaser
Charles Stanton Ogle	silent film actor
Charles Nelson Reilly	American comic actor and game show regular
Charles Reisner	American actor and film director

In television

Name	Description
Charles Gibson	American television journalist
Charles Kuralt	American television journalist
Charlie Rose	American host of a television interview show

In visual arts

Name	Description
Charles Addams	American cartoonist known for his particularly black humor and macabre characters
Charles Dellschau	Prussian-American outsider artist
Charles Eyck	Dutch visual artist
Chuck Jones	American animator
Charles R. Knight	wildlife artist, known for prehistoric restorations
Charles Lutyens	English artist and art therapist
Charles Chandler Reese (1862-1936), American illustrator, newspaper cartoonist, and artist
Charles Augustus Henry Lutyens	English soldier and painter
Charles Martinet	American actor known for playing the voice as Mario and other characters
Charles Prendergast	Canadian-American artist
Charles Schulz	creator of the comic strip Peanuts

Other areas of media, arts and entertainment

Name	Description
Charles White (YouTuber)	American YouTuber and Twitch streamer

=== Athletes ===
Name	Description
Charlie Austin	English footballer
Charles Aránguiz	Chilean professional footballer
Charles Aubry	French professional long distance runner
Charles Barkley	former NBA forward and a current NBA color commentator for TNT
Chuck Bednarik	NFL player, 1967, Philadelphia Eagles
Charles Betts	American professional wrestler
Charl Bouwer	South African paralympic swimmer
Charles Callison	American basketball player
Charles Cornelius	NFL and CFL player
Charles Daniels (1885–1973)	American freestyle swimmer
Charles Demmings	American football player
Charley Diamond	American football player
Charlie Fleming (footballer)	Scottish footballer
Charles "Buckets" Goldenberg	American All-Pro football player
Charles Green (disambiguation)	multiple people
Charles Harris	American football player
Chuck Hayes	American basketball player who currently plays for the Houston Rockets
Charles Horton (disambiguation)	multiple people
Charles Jagusah	American football player
Charles Jenkins (disambiguation)	multiple people
Charles Leclerc	Monégasque racing driver
Charles Lefrançois	Canadian high jumper
Charlie McCarthy	Irish hurler
Charles Meekins	American racing driver
Charles Myer	American major league baseball All Star second baseman
Charles Oakley	American basketball forward
Charles O'Bannon	American basketball player
Charl Pietersen (darts player)	South African darts player
Charles Radbourn	early Major League Baseball pitcher
Charles Ramsdell	Malagasy athlete
Charlie Reiter	American professional soccer player
Charles Fernando Basílio da Silva	Brazilian midfielder
Charles Sifford	first African American golfer to play in a PGA tour
Charles Tangus	Kenyan distance and marathon runner
Charles Washington	American football player

=== In politics ===
Name	Description
Charles Aubry	French jurist
Charles "Bubba" Chaney	Louisiana politician
Charles Francis Adams Sr.	American congressman and ambassador, grandson of John Adams
Charles Edward Bennett	Democratic U.S. Congressman from Florida
Charles Bent	first Governor of New Mexico Territory, assassinated in 1847
Charles Joseph Bonaparte	former U.S. Attorney General
Charles Bradlaugh	British political activist and militant atheist, founder of the National Secular Society
Charles Q. Brown Jr.	Chairman of the Joint Chiefs of Staff
Charles Carroll of Carrollton	last living signer of the U.S. Declaration of Independence (died 1832)
Charles C. Catron	Justice of the New Mexico Supreme Court
Charles Chanda	Zambian politician
Charles Colson	U.S. Richard Nixon's Chief Counsel, involved in the Watergate scandal
Charles Magill Conrad	former American Secretary of War
Charles Edward Bandaranaike Corea	Sri Lankan Sinhala lawyer
Charles Curtis	31st American Vice President, under Herbert Hoover
Charles G. Dawes	30th American Vice President, under Calvin Coolidge
Charles Devens	former U.S. Attorney General
Charles de Gaulle	French military leader and statesman
Charles Edward Perry de Silva	Sri Lankan Sinhala lawyer and politician
Charles Percival de Silva	Sri Lankan civil servant and politician
Charles de Silva Batuwantudawe	Sri Lankan Sinhala lawyer and politician
Charles Edirisuriya	Sri Lankan Sinhala Member of Parliament for Hambanthota
Charlie Elphicke	British politician
James Charles Evers	civil rights activist, older brother of Medgar Evers
Charles W. Fairbanks	26th American Vice President, under Theodore Roosevelt
Charles Hubert Zaleski Fernando	Sri Lankan Sinhala businessman, lawyer, and member of the Legislative Council of Ceylon
Charles Matthew Fernando	Sri Lankan Sinhala lawyer and scholar, first Sri Lankan Crown Counsel
Charles Fink	New Hampshire politician
Charles A. Ford	American diplomat
Charles Gibbs	Canadian politician
Charles J. M. Gwinn	American lawyer and politician
Charles Harper	Australian politician
Charles Alwis Hewavitharana	Sri Lankan Sinhala independence activist
Charles Evans Hughes	former U.S. Secretary of State
Charles Humphreys	Pennsylvania delegate to Continental Congress; refused to sign Declaration of Independence due to his Quaker beliefs
Charles Muguta Kajege	Tanzanian politician
Charles Y. Kaneshiro	American politician
Charles Kennedy	British politician
Charles Lapointe	Canadian politician
Chuck Larson	former U.S. ambassador to Latvia
Charles Lee	former U.S. Attorney General
Charles Lodwik	Mayor of New York City from 1694 to 1695
Charles Ambrose Lorensz	Sri Lankan Burgher lawyer, legislator, and journalist
Charles Mathias (1922–2010)	American politician
Charles Naylor (1806–1872)	American politician
Karolos Papoulias	former President of Greece
Charles Stewart Parnell	Irish political leader
Charles Sheedy	West Virginian politician
Charles Pasqua	French businessman and politician
Charles Pearson	former Solicitor for The City of London and early railway advocate
Chuck Robb	former Governor of Virginia and U.S. Senator
Charlie Rose	American congressman (Democrat from N.C.)
Charles Scott	Governor of Kentucky; also George Washington's Chief of Intelligence during the American Revolution
Charles Harding Smith	Irish politician
Charles G. Taylor	former President of Liberia
Charles Thomson	secretary of the Continental Congress
Charles Townsend	British politician
Charles Wilson	Texas congressman, subject of 2007 movie Charlie Wilson's War

=== In religion ===
- Charles Barff (1791–1866), English missionary
- Charles S. Levi (1868–1939), English-American rabbi

==== Saints ====
There are a number of historical figures known as "Saint Charles", although few are recognized across confessions. In the context of English and British history, "Saint Charles" is typically Charles I of England, recognized as a saint in the Anglican confession only. In Roman Catholicism, the best known Saint Charles is Charles Borromeo (1538–1584), an Italian cardinal, canonized by Pope Paul V in 1606. Charles, Duke of Brittany (1319–1364) had been canonized after his death, but Pope Gregory XI annulled this. Charles the Good (died 1127) is sometimes referred to as a saint, but while he was beatified in 1904, he has not been canonized.

Other Saints of the Roman Catholic Church, canonized after 1900:

- 1904: Saint Charles Garnier (1606–1649), French Jesuit missionary and martyr
- 1959: Saint Charles of Sezze (1616–1670), Franciscan lay brother
- 1964: Saint Charles Lwanga (1860 or 1865–1886), Ugandan Catholic martyr
- 1995: Saint Charles-Joseph-Eugène de Mazenod (1782–1861), French Catholic clergyman
- 2007: Saint Charles of Mount Argus (1821–1893), Passionist Dutch priest who worked in Ireland

Beatified:

- 1867: Blessed Charles Spinola (1564–1622), Genoese nobleman
- 2004: Blessed Charles I of Austria (1887–1922), last emperor of Austria, king of Hungary, Bohemia, etc

==== Church leaders ====
- Charles Wesley (1707–1788), co-founder of the Methodist movement and writer of thousands of hymns
- Charles Grandison Finney (1792–1875), a leader of the Second Great Awakening in America
- Charles Godwyn (1701-1770), British cleric and antiquarian
- Charles W. Penrose (1832–1925), leader in The Church of Jesus Christ of Latter-day Saints
- Charles Haddon Spurgeon (1834–1892), Reformed Baptist preacher
- Charles Harrison Mason (1866–1961), Pentecostal preacher and founder of the Church of God in Christ
- Charles Coughlin (1891–1979), American Catholic priest
- Charles E. Sheedy (1912–1990), member of the Congregation of Holy Cross

=== Nobility ===
See #History above for medieval and early modern royalty and nobility. This section lists noblemen born after 1700.

- Charles d'Ursel
- Charles-Joseph, 4th Duke d'Ursel
- Charles I, Duke of Brunswick-Wolfenbüttel (1713–1780)
- Charles III of Spain (1716–1788), first son of the second marriage of Philip V with Elizabeth Farnese of Parma
- "Bonnie Prince Charlie" Charles Edward Stuart (1720–1788), exiled claimant to the thrones of England, Scotland, and Ireland
- Charles Cornwallis, 1st Marquess Cornwallis (1738–1805), English military commander and colonial governor
- Charles XIII of Sweden (1748–1818), king of Sweden, the second son of King Adolf Frederick of Sweden and Louisa Ulrika of Prussia
- Charles Emmanuel IV of Sardinia (1751–1819)
- Charles IV of Spain (1748–1819), king of Spain from December 14, 1788, until his abdication on March 19, 1808
- Charles XIV John of Sweden (1763–1844), king of Sweden and Norway. Former Jean-Baptiste Bernadotte, Marshal of France
- Infante Carlos, Count of Molina (1788–1855)
- Charles, Count Léon (1806–1881), illegitimate son of Emperor Napoleon I of France and Catherine Eléonore Denuelle de la Plaigne
- Charles III, Prince of Monaco (1818–1889), founder of the casino in Monte Carlo
- Infante Carlos, Count of Montemolin (1818–1861)
- Charles I of Romania (1839–1914) first ruler of the Hohenzollern-Sigmaringen dynasty
- Carlos, Duke of Madrid (1848–1909)
- Charles I of Portugal (1863–1908), second to last King of Portugal and Algarves from 1889 to 1908
- Charles I of Austria (1887–1922), Emperor of Austria
- Charles II of Romania (1893–1853), eldest son of Ferdinand I
- Charles XV of Sweden (1826–1872), king of Sweden, the eldest son of King Oscar I and Josephine of Leuchtenberg
- Prince Charles of Belgium (1903–1983), second son of King Albert I of Belgium and Queen Elizabeth
- Archduke Karl Pius of Austria, Prince of Tuscany (1909–1953)
- Carlos Hugo, Duke of Parma (1930–2010)
- Juan Carlos I of Spain (born 1938), former King of Spain
- Charles III, King of the United Kingdom (born 1948), eldest son of Queen Elizabeth II and Prince Philip, Duke of Edinburgh

=== Scientists ===
Name	Description
Charles Babbage	English mathematician, philosopher, mechanical engineer and computer scientist
Charles L. Bennett	American astrophysicist
Charles Thomas Bolton	astronomer who proved the existence of black holes
Charles Bouman	American engineering professor
Charles W. Curtis	American mathematician
Charles Darwin	British naturalist
Charles Dawson	English archaeologist, involved in the Piltdown Man hoax
Charles Dupin	French mathematician, engineer, economist, and politician
Charles Ehresmann	French mathematician
Charles Fleming (ornithologist)	New Zealand ornithologist
Charles Godakumbura	Sri Lankan Sinhala archaeologist
Charles Hermite	French mathematician
Charles Thomas Jackson	American geologist
Charles T. Kowal	American astronomer, discoverer of Chiron and 2 moons of Jupiter
Charles Newton Little	American mathematician and civil engineer
Charles Lyell	Scottish scientist, founder of modern geology
Charles F. Marvin	American meteorologist
Charles Delucena Meigs	American obstetrician
Charles Karsner Mills	American neurologist
Charles Wright Mills	American sociologist
Charles Sanders Peirce	American chemist, mathematician, philosopher,
Charles E. de M. Sajous	American endocrinologist and laryngologist
Charles Sims (mathematician)	American mathematician
Charles Hazelius Sternberg	American fossil collector, involved in the Bone Wars
Charles Mortram Sternberg	son of above, also a fossil collector and paleontologist
Charles Tilly	American sociologist
Charles Doolittle Walcott	American paleontologist and Secretary of the Smithsonian Institution
Charles E. Wyman	Chair of the Ford Motor Company and professor of chemistry
Charles Thomson Rees Wilson	Scottish physicist
Charles M. C. Lee	Taiwanese behavioral economist

=== Other ===
Architecture

- Charles Armstrong (died 1981), Irish labourer
- Charles Barry, designer of the rebuilt Palace of Westminster
- Charles Barry Jr., his son
- Charles Thaddeus Russell (1875–1952), African American architect from Richmond, Virginia

Aviation and Aerospace

- Charles Lindbergh, first person to fly solo non-stop across the Atlantic Ocean
- Chuck Yeager, American test pilot and first man to break the sound barrier

Entrepreneurs and businessmen

- Charles Darrow (1889–1967), American businessman falsely credited as the inventor of Monopoly
- Don Charles Gemoris Attygalle (1836–1901), Sri Lankan Sinhala entrepreneur and mine owner
- Charles Henry de Soysa (1836–1890), Sri Lankan Sinhala planter and philanthropist
- Charles Keating, American financier, instigator of the "Keating 5" scandal
- Charles Macalester, businessman, banker, philanthropist, namesake of Macalester College
- Charles Rebozo, American Florida-based banker and businessman who was a close friend and confidant of President Richard Nixon
- Charles M. Schwab, founder of Bethlehem Steel
- Charles R. Schwab, stock-broker and founder of the Charles Schwab Corporation
- Charles Shor (born 1954), American businessman
- Charles Stewart Wurts (1790-1859), American businessman
- Charles Zadok (1897–1984), American businessman, art collector and patron

Military personnel

- Charles L. Armstrong (1948-2011), United States Marine Corps lieutenant colonel
- Charles M. Betts (1838-1905), American Medal of Honor recipient
- Charles Upham, most-decorated Commonwealth serviceman of World War Two

Criminals

- Charles A. Salvador (born Michael Peterson but better known as "Charles Bronson"), notorious English prisoner
- Charles Cullen, American serial killer and former nurse
- Charles Gibbs, 19th-century pirate
- Charles J. Guiteau, American assassin of 20th President James A. Garfield
- Charles Harrelson (1938–2007), American hitman
- Charles Hudspeth, American man convicted of murder
- Charles "Charlie" Lawson, American mass murderer and family annihilator
- Charles "Lucky" Luciano, Italian-American mobster
- Charles Manson (1934–2017), American cult leader, convicted murder conspirator
- Charles Nicoletti, American mobster
- Charles "Carl" Panzram, American serial killer
- Charles Ponzi, Italian-American con-man, gave name to Ponzi scheme
- Charles Sobhraj, Indian serial killer
- Charles Starkweather, American teenage spree killer
- Charles Whitman, American spree killer and former Marine

== Other uses of the name ==
- Carolus (coin)
- "Charles", a short story by Shirley Jackson

== See also ==
- Carl (name)
- Carles (name)
- Charley (disambiguation)
- Charlie (disambiguation)
- Charls
- Charly (disambiguation)
- Chuck (disambiguation)
- Charleston (disambiguation)
- Charlestown (disambiguation)
- Saint Charles (disambiguation)
- Chas (disambiguation)
