= Carl =

Carl may refer to:

- Carl (name), includes info about the name, variations of the name, and a list of people with the name
- Carl, Georgia, city in USA
- Carl, West Virginia, an unincorporated community
- Carl², a TV series
- An informal nickname for a student or alum of Carleton College

CARL may refer to:

- Canadian Association of Research Libraries
- Colorado Alliance of Research Libraries

== See also ==
- Carle (disambiguation)
- Charles
- Carle, a surname
- Karl (disambiguation)
- Karle (disambiguation)
