= Karla (name) =

- Gender: female

Other names
- Related names: Carla, Karl, Carl

Karla is the feminine form of Karl.

People with this given name include;

- Karla Absolonová-Bufková (1855–1941), Czech writer, ethnographer and folklorist
- Karla Álvarez (1972–2013), Mexican actress
- Karla Aponte (born 1998), Puerto Rican model
- Karla Avelar (born 1978), Salvadoran activist
- Karla Barrera (born 1984), Puerto Rican windsurfer
- Karla Bernard, Canadian politician
- Karla Bigham (born 1979), Minnesota politician
- Karla Black, Scottish sculptor
- Karla Boddy (born 1985), British racing cyclist
- Karla Bonoff (born 1951), American singer-songwriter
- Karla van der Boon (born 1968), Dutch water polo goalkeeper
- Karla Borger (born 1988), German beach volleyball player
- Karla Burns (1954–2021), American mezzo-soprano and actress
- Karla Cabello (born 1997), Cuban-American singer-songwriter
- Karla Valentina Camarena (1986 or 1987 - 2020), Mexican trans activist
- Karla Cardoso (born 1981), Brazilian judoka
- Karla Carrillo (born 1988), Mexican beauty pageant
- Karla Conga (born 1994), Peruvian footballer
- Karla Conway (born 1946), American model
- Karla Cossío (born 1985), Mexican actress
- Karla Costa (born 1978), Brazilian basketball player
- Karla Crome (born 1988), English actress
- Karla Cubias (born 1983), Salvadoran singer
- Karla Cuevas, Honduran justice minister
- Karla DeVito (born 1953), American singer
- Karla Drenner (born 1961), American academic and politician in Georgia
- Karla Echenique (born 1986), Dominican Republic volleyball player
- Karla Erbová (born 1933), Czech writer
- Karla Estrada (born 1974), Filipina actress and singer
- Karla Fernández (born 1977), Venezuelan weightlifter
- Karla Frister (fl. 1958–62), German coxswain
- Karla González Cruz (born 1976), Mexican politician
- Karla Gower (born 1957), American public relations professor
- Karla Grant, Australian presenter, producer and journalist
- Karla M. Gray (1947–2017), American judge, first woman to serve as a state Chief Justice
- Karla Gutöhrlein née Knospe (born 1910, date of death unknown), German dancer and film actress
- Karla Hart, Australian Noongar movie director and presenter
- Karla Henry (born 1986), Filipino-Canadian beauty pageant
- Karla Höcker (1901–1992), German writer and musician
- Karla F.C. Holloway (born 1949), American legal scholar
- Karla Homolka (born 1970), Canadian serial killer
- Karla Hooper, American politician
- Karla Huston (born 1949), American poet
- Karla Jay (born 1947), American feminist and gender studies academic
- Karla Jiménez (born 1982), Mexican beauty pageant
- Karla Karch-Gailus (born 1964), Canadian basketball player
- Karla Kienzl (1922–2018), Austrian luger
- Karla Kirkegaard (born 1954), American geneticist and microbiologist
- Karla Klarić (born 1994), Croatian volleyball player
- Karla Kuskin (1932–2009), American children's author, poet, and illustrator
- Karla LaVey (born 1952), American radio host, former High Priestess of the Church of Satan
- Karla Linke (born 1960), East German breaststroke swimmer
- Karla López (born 1977), Swedish Green Party politician
- Karla MacFarlane (born 1969), Canadian (Nova Scotia) politician
- Karla Máchová (1853–1920), Czech teacher, women's rights activist, politician
- Karla Martínez (born 1976), Mexican TV Show Host
- Karla Mayer (1918–?), German Nazi death camp guard
- Karla Patricia Ruiz MacFarland, Mexican politician, 28th mayor of Tijuana
- Karla Monroig (born 1979), Puerto Rican actress, model and television host
- Karla Moreno (born 1988), Guatemalan weightlifter
- Karla Moskowitz (born ca. 1942), American justice
- Karla Cheatham Mosley (born 1981), American actress and singer
- Karla Nelsen (born 1965), American bodybuilder
- Karla Nieto (born 1995), Mexican footballer
- Karla Ortiz (born 1991), Bolivian volleyball player
- Karla Peijs (born 1944), Dutch politician, minister of Transport and Waterworks
- Karla Peniche (born 1988), Mexican model
- Karla Poewe (born 1941), German-born American anthropologist and historian
- Karla Pollmann (born 1963), German classical scholar
- Karla Pretorius (born 1990), South African netball player
- Karla Quinn (born 1988), British figure skater
- Karla Reuter (born 1984), Australian soccer player
- Karla Roffeis (born 1958), German volleyball player
- Karla Rothstein (born 1966), American architect
- Karla Rubilar (born 1977), Chilean politician
- Karla Satchell, (born 1975), American microbiologist
- Karla Schmidt (born 1974), German writer and editor
- Karla Schramm (1891–1980), American film actress
- Karla Rosa da Silva (born 1984), Brazilian pole vaulter
- Karla Šitić (born 1992), Croatian distance swimmer
- Karla Šlechtová (born 1977), Czech politician and economist
- Karla Souza (born 1985), Mexican actress
- Karla Stephens-Tolstoy (born 1969), Canadian businesswoman
- Karla Suárez (born 1969), Cuban writer
- Karla Tamburrelli, American actress and television producer
- Karla Tritten (born 1978), Canadian wheelchair basketball player
- Karla Faye Tucker (1959–1998), the first woman to be executed in the United States since 1984
- Karla Urrutia (born 1994), Mexican squash player
- Karla Villalobos (born 1986), Costa Rican footballer
- Karla Villarreal Benassini (born 1975), Mexican politician
- Karla Cornejo Villavicencio (born 1989), Ecuadorian-American writer
- Karla Vreš (born 1999), Croatian basketball player
- Karla Wheelock (born 1968), Mexican mountaineer, writer, and lecturer
- Karla Jessen Williamson (born 1954), Greenlandic epistemologist and Director of the Arctic Institute of North America
- Karla Woisnitza (born 1952), German artist
- Karla Zadnik, American optometrist

== Fictional characters ==
- Karla, a character in Jacqueline Susann's novel Once Is Not Enough
- Karla, a character from Open Season: Call of Nature, see List of fictional musteloids in animation
- Karla, a male Soviet Intelligence officer in several novels by John le Carré
- Karla, a swordmaster from the tactical role-playing game Fire Emblem: The Blazing Blade
- Karla Bentham, a character in the BBC series Waterloo Road
- Karla-Heinrike Langer, a character from Strike Witches
- Karla Sofen, Marvel Comics supervillain known as Moonstone
- Karla the Zebra, a zebra on Mama Mirabelle's Home Movies

== See also ==
- Karla (disambiguation)
- Kalla (name)
- Karla Caves, a complex of ancient Buddhist rock-cut caves in India
- Karla (disambiguation), for other uses
- Karli (name)
- Karlo (name)
- Karly
- Karola
- Karra (name)
- Kharla Chávez
