= Karlina =

Karlina is a Danish, Faroese, Norwegian and Slovene feminine given name that is an alternate form of Karla and a short form of Karolina. Karlīna is a Latvian feminine given name that is a feminine form of Kārlis. Notable people known by this name include the following:

== Given name ==
- Karlīna Miksone (born 2000), Latvian football player
- Karlina Leksono Supelli (born 1958), Indonesian philosopher and astronomer

== Middle name ==
- Lisa Karlina Lumongdong (born 1968), Indonesian chess master

== See also ==
- Carlina (name)
- Kalina (given name)
- Kalina (surname)
- Karina (name)
- Karlin (surname)
- Karline
- Karolina
