= Karle (name) =

Karle is a given name and surname.

== Notable persons ==
=== Given name ===
- Karle Wilson Baker (1878–1960), American author
- Karle Carder-Andrews (born 1989), English football player
- Karle Hammond (born 1974), English rugby player
- Karle Warren (born 1992), American actress

=== Surname ===
- Charles Karle (1898–1946), American rower
- Isabella Karle (1921–2017), American physical chemist
- Jerome Karle (1918–2013), American physical chemist
- John L. Karle (1894–1953), American lawyer and politician

== See also ==
- Karle (disambiguation)
- Kaarle
- Karie (name)
- Karlee
- Karley
- Karli (name)
- Karlie
- Karlo (name)
- Karly
- Karre
- Karrle Tu Bhi Mohabbat
