= Karla =

Karla may refer to:

== People ==
- Karla (name), a feminine given name
- Petras Karla (1937–1969), Soviet Olympic rower

== Places ==
- Karla, Greece, a town in Rigas Feraios municipality of Magnesia
- Karla, Kose Parish, a village in Kose Parish, Harju County, Estonia
- Karla, Rae Parish, a village in Rae Parish, Harju County, Estonia
- Kärla, a settlement in Saaremaa Parish, Saare County, Estonia
- Karla, Mawal, a village in Pune district, Maharashtra, India
- Karla, Ratnagiri, a village in Ratnagiri, Maharashtra, India
- Karli, India, a town in Maharashtra, India, site of the Karla Caves
- Karla crater, a meteorite impact crater in Russia
- Lake Karla, a lake in Thessaly, Greece
- (181708) 1993 FW, a trans-Neptunian object, the second discovered, for which Karla was an early proposed name

== Fiction ==
- Karla (character), the Soviet spymaster who serves as an overarching antagonist in the works of John le Carré
  - The Karla trilogy, three of le Carré's George Smiley novels focusing on Karla
- Karla (film), a 2006 film by Joel Bender

== See also ==
- Carla (disambiguation)
