= Carolus =

Carolus may refer to:

== People ==
- Carolus (name)
- the medieval Latin form of the name Charles
  - Charlemagne (742–814)
- King Charles XII of Sweden, who is sometimes referred to as "Carolus Rex"

== Scientific ==
- Carolus (plant), a genus of flowering plants in the family Malpighiaceae
- Carolus (planthopper), a genus of insects in the family Cixiidae
- 16951 Carolus Quartus, an asteroid named after Charles IV, Holy Roman Emperor

== Miscellaneous ==
- Carolus (coin), several coins
- Carolus, several ships; see List of Swedish ships of the line

== See also ==
- Carl (name)
- Charles
- Karl (disambiguation)
