= Karl =

Karl may refer to:

== People ==
- Karl (given name), including a list of people and characters with the name
- Karl der Große (748–814), commonly known in English as Charlemagne
- Karl of Austria (1887–1922), last Austrian Emperor
- Karl (footballer) (born 1993), Karl Cachoeira Della Vedova Júnior, Brazilian footballer
- Karl Jacobs (born 1998) American content creator known mononymously as Karl
- Karl (surname)

== In myth ==
- Karl (mythology), in Norse mythology, a son of Rig and considered the progenitor of peasants (churl)
- Karl, giant in Icelandic myth, associated with Drangey island

== Vehicles ==
- Opel Karl, a car
- ST Karl, Swedish tugboat requisitioned during the Second World War as ST Empire Henchman

== Other uses ==
- Karl, Germany, municipality in Rhineland-Palatinate, Germany
- Karl-Gerät, AKA Mörser Karl, 600mm German mortar used in the Second World War
- Korean Amateur Radio League, a national non-profit organization for amateur radio enthusiasts in South Korea
- KARL, a radio station in Minnesota
- List of storms named Karl, a number of named tropical cyclones
- Karl the fog, a local San Francisco bay area term referring to the climatically reliable fog
- Karl's Building, a building in Los Angeles, California

== See also ==
- Carl (disambiguation)
- Carle, a name
- Karle (disambiguation)
- Carll S. Burr Jr. (1858–1936), New York politician
- Carol (disambiguation)
- Churl (also churl, ceorl, carl), freeman peasant in the Scandinavian caste system
- John L. Karle (1894–1953), New York politician
- Karl-Heinz
- Karlo (name)
