= Karlin (surname) =

Karlin is a surname tracing back to the Hasidic dynasty originating with Rebbe Aaron the Great of Karlin in present-day Belarus. Alternate derivations have the name with origins from the Carolus, a Latin name that means Charles. Notable people with the surname include:

- Alma Karlin, Slovene-Austrian traveler, writer, poet, collector, polyglot and theosophist.
- Ben Karlin
- John Karlin, industrial psychologist
- Joyce Karlin
- Kenneth Karlin, Danish songwriter and producer
- Miriam Karlin
- Ored Karlin (1905–1969), Swedish chess player
- Samuel Karlin
- William Karlin (1882–1944), New York lawyer and Socialist politician

== See also ==
- Karlin (disambiguation)
- Karli (name)
- Karlie
- Karlik (name)
- Karlina
- Karline
- Karlijn
- Karlyn
- Karolin (name)
