= Kārlis Zariņš =

Kārlis Zariņš may refer to:

- Kārlis Zariņš (writer)
- Kārlis Reinholds Zariņš
