= Anna Louisa Miller =

American artist (1906–1997)

Anna Louisa Flath Miller
- Born: January 13, 1906; Greenbush, Wisconsin
- Died: June 27, 1997 (aged 91); Eau Claire, Wisconsin
- Style: Primitivism, Outsider art, Naïve art

Anna Louisa Miller (née Flath; January 13, 1906 – June 27, 1997) was a self-taught artist from Wisconsin working in painting. A farmer, she took up artmaking in her late thirties without any formal training, creating portraits and landscape views of western Wisconsin, particularly of the Eau Claire River.

== Biography ==
Anna Louisa "Annie" Flath was born on January 13, 1906, into a family of farmers of Sheboygan County, Wisconsin. In 1920, she married Lynn Miller (1899–1970), and the couple relocated across the state to a farmstead in Bridge Creek, Eau Claire County.

After spending time in Milwaukee during WWII, Miller began painting on her own, turning to the surroundings of the cities of Eau Claire, Chippewa Falls, and Augusta as her primary source material. Madison artist Wynn Chamberlain discovered Miller's art in 1950 and shared it with the Museum of Modern Art, in New York. In turn, MoMA advised Milwaukee collectors Charles and Eugenia Zadok to advocate for her work to be included in an upcoming exhibition of outsider art at the Milwaukee Art Institute (a predecessor to the Milwaukee Art Museum).

Miller sent a total of five works to the exhibition. Describing her as a "true primitive", news articles covering the event highlighted her straightforward style, deliberate lack of perspective, and compositional process akin to mapping. Two of her paintings, October Storm and Evening Near the Eau Claire, were given to the Institute shortly after the end of the show, becoming the first self-taught American artworks to be collected by the institution.

Miller continued painting until the death of her husband in 1970. Six years later, she moved into a retirement home in Eau Claire and eventually gave the bulk of her works to Viterbo University, in La Crosse. She died on June 27, 1997, at the age of 91.
