= Karlik (name) =

Karlik or Karlík is a given name and surname. It is a Czech masculine given name that is a diminutive form of Karel, which derives from Ceorl. The surname has a similar derivation. Notable people referred to by this name include the following:

== Surname ==
- Berta Karlik (1908 – 1996), Austrian physicist.
- Bohuslav Karlík (1908 – 1996), Czechoslovak canoeist
- Josef Karlík (1928 – 2009), Czech actor
- Karol Karlík (born 1986), Slovak footballer

== See also ==
- Karli (name)
- Karlin (surname)
