= Karli (name) =

Karli is an English feminine given name that is an alternate form of Karlie and Carly as well as Danish and Swedish feminine given name that is a diminutive form of Karla and an alternate form of Karly. It is a Danish, Finnish, Icelandic [ˈkʰa(r)tlɪ], Old Danish, Old Norse [ˈkɑrle] and Swedish masculine given name that is a diminutive form of Karl. Notable people known by this name include the following:

== Given name ==
- Karli June Cerankowski, female American professor
- Karli Coburger (born 1929), male German military officer
- Karli Johansen (born 1992), female Canadian field hockey player
- Karli Sohn-Rethel (1882–1966), male German painter
- Karli Whetstone, female American country music writer and singer

== Surname ==
- Max Karli, Swiss film producer
- Musa Karli (born 1990), German football player

== Fictional characters ==
- Karli, female muppet character on Sesame Street
- Karli, twin sister of Kami in The Amazing Race
- Karli, character in the Vinland Saga manga
- Karli Morgenthau (Flag Smasher), supervillainess in Marvel Comics franchise

== See also ==
- Karli (disambiguation)
- Kali (name)
- Kalli (name)
- Karai (disambiguation)
- Karbi (disambiguation)
- Kari (name)
- Karki (surname)
- Karl (given name)
- Karla (name)
- Karle (name)
- Karlie
- Karlik (name)
- Karlin (surname)
- Kārlis
- Karlo (name)
- Karly
- Karoli (name)
- Karri (name)
