= Kaarlo =

Kaarlo is a Finnish given name. Notable people with the name include:

- Kaarlo Bergbom (1843–1906), Finnish theatre director
- Kaarlo Blomstedt (1880–1949), Finnish historian and archivist
- Kaarlo Castrén (1860–1938), Prime Minister of Finland
- Kaarlo Edvard Kivekäs (1866–1940), Finnish general
- Kaarlo Ekholm (1884–1946), Finnish gymnast who competed in the 1912 Summer Olympics
- Kaarlo Halttunen (1909–1986), Finnish actor
- Kaarlo Harvala (1885–1942), Finnish journalist and politician
- Kaarlo Heiskanen (1894–1962), Finnish general and Knight of the Mannerheim Cross
- Kaarlo Juho Ståhlberg (1865–1952), Finnish jurist and academic
- Kaarlo Kangasniemi (born 1941), former Finnish weightlifter
- Kaarlo Koskelo (1888–1953), Finnish wrestler who competed in the 1912 Summer Olympics
- Kaarlo "Kalle" Kustaa Paasia (1883–1961), Finnish gymnast who competed in the 1908 Summer Olympics
- Kaarlo Leinonen (1914–1975), Finnish general and Minister of Defence
- Kaarlo Linkola (born Collan) (1888–1942), Finnish botanist and phytogeographer
- Kaarlo Mäkinen (1892–1980), Finnish freestyle wrestler and Olympic champion
- Kaarlo Maaninka (born 1953), former Finnish long-distance runner
- Kaarlo Rantanen (born 1988), Finnish football player
- Kaarlo Sarkia (1902–1945), Finnish poet
- Kaarlo Soinio (1888–1960), Finnish gymnast and amateur football (soccer) player
- Kaarlo Tuominen (1908–2006), Finnish steeplechase runner
- Kaarlo Uskela (1878–1922), Finnish writer, poet and anarchist
- Kaarlo Vähämäki (1892–1984), Finnish gymnast who competed in the 1912 Summer Olympics
- Kaarlo Väkevä (1909–1932), Finnish boxer who competed in the 1928 Summer Olympics
- Kaarlo Vasama (1885–1926), Finnish gymnast who competed in the 1912 Summer Olympics
- Kaarlo Wirilander (1908–1988), Finnish historian

== See also ==
- Kaarle
