= Carlene =

Carlene may refer to:

- Carlene (name)
- "Carlene", a song by Phil Vassar
