= Teresa Puthussery =

Australian-born vision scientist

- Born: 1978 or 1979

Academic background
- Education: University of Melbourne, Australia (B.S.) (PhD)

Academic work
- Discipline: Neurobiology, optometry
- Sub-discipline: Vision science
- Institutions: Oregon Health and Science University; University of California, Berkeley

Teresa Puthussery (born 1978 or 1979) is an Australian-born vision scientist and an associate professor in the Herbert Wertheim School of Optometry and Vision Science at the University of California, Berkeley. Much of her work concerns retinal ganglion cells in primates. In 2025, she was named a MacArthur Fellow.

== Biography ==
Puthussery was raised in Warragul, Victoria Australia. Her mother was a math teacher and her father was a science teacher.

Puthussery studied at the University of Melbourne, Australia, graduating with a B.S. in 2000, a PhD in 2005, and a postgraduate degree in 2006. Before becoming a professor at the University of California, Berkeley, she was a postdoctoral research fellow and later an assistant professor at Oregon Health and Science University.

== Selected publications ==
- Puthussery, T., Gayet‐Primo, J., Taylor, W. R., & Haverkamp, S. (2011). Immunohistochemical identification and synaptic inputs to the diffuse bipolar cell type DB1 in macaque retina. Journal of Comparative Neurology, 519(18), 3640–3656. https://doi.org/10.1002/cne.22756
- Puthussery, T., Venkataramani, S., Gayet-Primo, J., Smith, R. G., & Taylor, W. R. (2013). NaV1.1 channels in axon initial segments of bipolar cells augment input to magnocellular visual pathways in the primate retina. The Journal of Neuroscience, 33(41), 16045–16059. https://doi.org/10.1523/JNEUROSCI.1249-13.2013
- Puthussery, T., Percival, K. A., Venkataramani, S., Gayet-Primo, J., Grünert, U., & Taylor, W. R. (2014). Kainate Receptors Mediate Synaptic Input to Transient and Sustained OFF Visual Pathways in Primate Retina. The Journal of Neuroscience, 34(22), 7611–7621. https://doi.org/10.1523/JNEUROSCI.4855-13.2014
- Wang, A. Y. M., Kulkarni, M. M., McLaughlin, A. J., Gayet, J., Smith, B. E., Hauptschein, M., McHugh, C. F., Yao, Y. Y., & Puthussery, T. (2023). An ON-type direction-selective ganglion cell in primate retina. Nature, 623(7986), 381–386. https://doi.org/10.1038/s41586-023-06659-4
