= Karline =

Karline is a German feminine given name that is an alternate form of Karla. Notable people known by this name include the following:

== Given name ==
- Karlīne Nīmane (born 1990) Latvian basketball player
- Karlīne Štāla (born 1986) Latvian race car driver

== See also ==
- Karine
- Karlene
- Karlie
- Karlin (surname)
- Karlina
- Karoline (disambiguation)
- Karrine Steffans
