= Karli =

Karli may refer to:

== Places ==
=== Turkey ===
- Karlı, Ardanuç, a village in Artvin Province
- Karlı, Çan, a village in the Çanakkale Province
- Karlı, Keşan, a village in the Edirne Province
- Karlı, Vezirköprü, a neighbourhood in Samsun Province
- Karlı, Yüksekova, a village in Hakkâri Province, Turkey

=== Elsewhere ===
- Karli-Eli, historical name of Aetolia-Acarnania, a region in Greece
- Karli, Koper, a small settlement in Littoral, Slovenia
- Karli, India or Karla, village in Maharashtra
- Karla Caves, a cave complex in Maharashtra, India

== Other uses ==
- Karli (name)
- Eupithecia karli, a species of moth

== See also ==
- Karly, a name
- Karri (disambiguation)
