= Kaarle =

Kaarle is a Finnish masculine given name that is a form of Charles. Notable people with this name include the following:

- Kaarle Knuutila (1868–1949), Finnish politician
- Kaarle Krohn (1863–1933), Finnish folklorist
- Kaarle Leivonen (1886–1978), Finnish wrestler
- Kaarle McCulloch (born 1988), Australian track cyclist
- Kaarle Nordenstreng (born 1941), Finnish sociologist
- Kaarle Ojanen (chess player) (1918–2009), Finnish chess player
- Kaarle Pekkala (1919–2000), Finnish sports shooter
- Kaarle Tapper (born 1995), Finnish competitive sailor
- Kaarle Väinö Voionmaa full name of Väinö Voionmaa (1869–1947), Finnish diplomat, politician, minister and chancellor

== See also ==
- Kaarel
- Kaarlo
- Karle (name)
