= Charlotte Wilson (disambiguation) =

Charlotte Wilson was an English anarchist.

Charlotte Wilson may also refer to:

- Charlotte Wilson (VSO), volunteer teacher murdered in Burundi
- Charlotte Wilson (footballer), Australian footballer
- Charlotte Wilson (skier), Australian freestyle skier
- Charlotte Day Wilson, musician
- a pen name used by author Karle Wilson Baker
