= Carlijn =

Carlijn is a Dutch feminine given name that is a diminutive form of Carolina and Caroline. Notable people with the name include:

- Carlijn Achtereekte (born 1990), Dutch speed skater
- Carlijn Bouten (born 1967), Dutch professor of Cell-Matrix Interactions
- Carlijn de Groot (born 1986), Dutch cricketer
- Carlijn Jans (born 1987), Dutch female volleyball player
- Carlijn Schoutens (born 1994), Dutch-American speed skater
- Carlijn Welten (born 1987), Dutch field hockey player

== See also ==
- Karlijn
