= Carla (disambiguation) =

Carla is a feminine given name.

Carla may also refer to:

== Weather ==
- Tropical Storm Carla (1956)
- Hurricane Carla, one of two Category 5 tropical cyclones during the 1961 Atlantic hurricane season
- Typhoon Carla (1962), a Category 1 typhoon
- Typhoon Carla (1967), a Category 5 typhoon
- Typhoon Carla (1965), a Category 4 typhoon
- Tropical Storm Carla (1971)
- Typhoon Carla (1974), a Category 1 typhoon
- Tropical Storm Carla (1977)

== Other uses ==
- 1470 Carla, a main belt asteroid
- "Carla" (song), a song by Miguel Bosé
- Carla (album), a 1987 album by Steve Swallow
- Carla (film), a British television crime drama film
- Carle (disambiguation)

== See also ==
- Karla (disambiguation)
