= Karlie =

Karlie is an English and Swedish feminine given name that is a feminine form of Karl, a diminutive form of Karla and an alternate form of Karly. Notable people known by this name include the following:

== Given name ==
- Karlie Hay (born 1997), American model and beauty pageant titleholder (Miss Teen USA 2016)
- Karlie Kloss (born 1992), American fashion model and entrepreneur
- Karlie Noon, indigenous Australia astronomer
- Karlie Redd (born 1974), American television personality, hip-hop artist, model and actress
- Karlie Samuelson (born 1995), American basketball player

== See also ==
- Carlie
- Karle (name)
- Karlee
- Karli (name)
- Karlin (surname)
- Karline
