= Kārlis =

Male given name

Kārlis or Karlis is a given name. Notable people with the name include:

- Kārlis Aperāts (1892–1944), Latvian Standartenführer in the Waffen SS during World War II
- Kārlis Ašmanis (1898–1962), Latvian footballer
- Kārlis Balodis (1864–1931), Latvian economist, financist, statistician and demographist
- Kārlis Baumanis (1835–1905), better known as Baumaņu Kārlis, a Latvian composer
- Kārlis Bētiņš (1867–1943), Latvian chess master and composer of studies
- Kārlis Bone (1899–1941), Latvian footballer
- Kārlis Būmeisters (born Riga), Latvian musician and politician
- Karlis Ezergailis, Australian Motorcycle speedway rider
- Kārlis Gailītis (1936–1992), Latvian Lutheran archbishop
- Kārlis Goppers (1876–1941), Latvian military officer and the founder and President of Latvijas Skautu un Gaidu Centrālā Organizācija
- Hugo Kārlis Grotuss (1884–1951), Latvian painter, classified as a Realist
- Kārlis Irbītis (1904–1997), Latvian aeroplane designer
- Kārlis Johansons (1890–1929), Latvian-Soviet avant-garde artist
- Kārlis Lācis (born 1977), Latvian composer
- Kārlis Leiškalns (born 1951), Latvian politician
- Kārlis Lejnieks (born 1988), retired Latvian tennis player currently pursuing interest in coaching
- Kārlis Kepke (1890–????), Latvian cyclist and Olympic competitor
- Kārlis Klāsens (1895–1973), Latvian sailor and Olympic competitor
- Kārlis Klāsups (1922–1991), Latvian chess master
- Kārlis Kļava (1907–1941), Latvian sports shooter and Olympic competitor
- Kārlis Lasmanis (born 1994), Latvian basketball player and Olympic competitor
- Kārlis Lobe (1895–1985), Latvian Nazi collaborator and high-ranking Waffen-SS officer
- Kārlis Mīlenbahs (1853–1916), the first native speaker of Latvian to devote his career to linguistics
- Kārlis Mūsiņš (1919–1955), Latvian Untersturmführer in the Waffen-SS during WWII
- Kārlis Muižnieks (born 1964), former basketball player, head coach of Barons LMT
- Karlis Osis (1917–1997), Latvian-born American parapsychologist
- Karlis Ozols (1912–2001), Latvian-Australian chess player
- Kārlis Padegs (1911–1940), Latvian artist
- Kārlis Paegle (1911–1997), Latvian ice hockey player
- Kārlis Pētersons (1903–1980), Latvian wrestler
- Kārlis Prauls (1895–1941), Latvian general, from 1930 to 1940 was a commander of Aizsargi organization
- Kārlis Sensbergs, Waffen-Unterscharführer in the Waffen SS during World War II
- Kārlis Skalbe (1879–1945), Latvian writer, poet, and activist
- Kārlis Skrastiņš (born 1974), Latvian ice hockey player
- Kārlis Smilga (born 1975), Latvian curler
- Kārlis Šteins (1911–1983), Latvian and Soviet astronomer
- Kārlis Tīls (1906–196?), Latvian international football defender and football manager
- Kārlis Ulmanis (1877–1942), prominent Latvian politician in pre-World War II Latvia
- Kārlis Vērdiņš (born 1979), Latvian poet
- Kārlis Vilciņš (1892–1972), Latvian wrestler and Olympic competitor
- Kārlis Zāle (1888–1942), Latvian sculptor
- Kārlis Zariņš (1879–1963), Latvian diplomat
- Kārlis Zariņš (1889–1978), Latvian writer
- Kārlis Zilpaušs (1918–1944), Latvian ice hockey player
- Kārlis Zirnis (born 1977), Latvian ice hockey player

== See also ==
- Karli (name)
- Rich Karlis (born 1959), former American Football placekicker
