= Karlene =

Karlene is an English feminine given name that is a feminine form of Carl and an alternate form of Carla. Notable people referred to by this name include the following:

== Given name ==
- Karlene Davis (born 1946), British midwife
- Karlene Faith (1938- 2017), Canadian writer
- Karlene Haughton (born 1972), Canadian hurdles athlete
- Karlene Kirlew-Robertson, Jamaican politician
- Karlene Maywald (born 1961), Australian politician

== See also ==
- Carlene (name)
- Karlee
- Karleen
- Karline
