= Karleen =

Karleen is a feminine given name. Notable people referred to by this name include the following:

== Given name ==
- Karleen Bradford (born 1936), Canadian author
- Karleen Koen, American novelist
- Karleen Pendleton Jiménez (born 1971), American writer
- Karleen Thompson (born 1968), American basketball coach

== See also ==
- Carleen (given name)
- Karlee
- Karlene
