= Kahle =

Kahle is a German surname derived from Köhl. Notable people with the surname include:

- Brewster Kahle (born 1960), American internet entrepreneur and digital librarian
- Bronna Kahle (born 1968), American politician from Michigan
- Danielle Kahle (born 1989), American figure skater
- Manon Kahle (born 1980), American actress
- Martin Kahle (1916–1984), American politician from Nebraska
- Paul E. Kahle (1875–1964), German orientalist
- Willy Kahle (1892–unknown), German flying ace

== See also ==
- C. W. Kahles (1878–1931), German-born American cartoonist
- Kahless, fictional Klingon emperor
- Kahe (disambiguation)
