= Kaarel =

Male given name

- Gender: Male
- Name day: 28 January

Origin
- Region of origin: Estonia

Other names
- Related names: Karl, Carl, Kalle

Kaarel is an Estonian masculine given name. It is a cognate of the North Germanic names Karl and Carl and the French and English Charles.

Kaarel may refer to:

- Kaarel Eenpalu (1888–1942), Estonian journalist, politician and former Prime Minister of Estonia
- Kaarel Heinver (1886–1961), Estonian politician
- Kaarel Ird (1909–1986), Estonian actor and theatre director
- Kaarel Kais (born 1974), Estonian volleyball player
- Kaarel Kiidron (born 1990), Estonian football defender
- Kaarel Kilvet (1944–2005), Estonian actor, singer and director
- Kaarel Kübar (1907–2004), Estonian sport shooter
- Kaarel Kurismaa (born 1939), Estonian artist
- Kaarel Liidak (1889–1945), Estonian agronomist and politician
- Kaarel Liimand (1906–1941), Estonian painter
- Kaarel Lukk (1887–1970), Estonian racewalker
- Kaarel Nurmsalu (born 1991), Estonian ski jumper and combined skier
- Kaarel Orviku (1935–2021), Estonian marine geologist and nature photographer
- Kaarel Parts (1873–1940), Estonian lawyer, judge and politician
- Kaarel Pürg (born 1949), Estonian politician
- Kaarel Robert Pusta (1883-1964), Estonian politician and former Minister of Foreign Affairs of Estonia
- Kaarel Tarand (born 1966), Estonian journalist and editor
- Kaarel Zilmer (born 1947), Estonian skier and coach

== See also ==
- Kaarle
