= Carlena =

Carlena is a feminine given name. Notable people with this name include the following:

- Carlena Williams (1942 – 2013), American vocalist
- Olivia Carlena Cole, known as Olivia Cole (1942 – 2018), American actress

== See also ==
- Carlen (surname)
- Carlene (name)
- Carlina (name)
- Carolena Carstens
