= Carlee =

Carlee is the feminine form of Carl or Charles and is derived from the Old English word "ceorl", meaning "free man".

Notable people with the name include:

- Carlee Beattie (born 1982), Australian Paralympic athlete
- Carlee Bright (born Kennedy Cummins, 2000), American professional wrestler and cheerleader
- Carlee Campbell (born 1988), Canadian ice hockey player
- Carlee Fernández (born 1973), American sculptor, photographer and taxidermist
- Carlee Giammona (born 2000), American professional association footballer for Tampa Bay Sun FC
- Carlee Hoffman (born 1986), American wheelchair basketball player
- Carlee Russell (born 1997), American nursing student who partook in a disappearance hoax
- Carlee Taylor (born 1989), Australian racing cyclist
- Carlee Turner (born 1997), American ice hockey player for the Boston Pride

== See also ==
- Carl Lee (disambiguation), a list of articles with the title
- Carle (surname), a list of people with the surname
- Carle (given name), a list of people with the given name
- Carleen (given name), a list of people with the given name
- Carlen (surname), a list of people with the surname
- Carlene (name), a list of people with the name
- Carles (name), a list of people with the given name, middle name, or surname
- Carley (name), a list of people with the given name and surname
- Caylee (given name), a list of people with the given name
- Karlee (given name), a list of people with the given name
