= Karbi =

Karbi may refer to:

== Places ==
- Karbi, Armenia
- Karbi Anglong Plateau, an extension of the Indian Plate in Assam, India
- Karbi Anglong district, a district of Assam, north-eastern India

== Other uses ==
- Karbi people, an ethnic group of North-east India
- Karbi language, the Sino-Tibetan languages spoken by Karbi people
- Karbi languages, a branch of the Kuki-Chin group of Sino-Tibetan

== See also ==
- Karli (name)
- Karri (disambiguation)
