= Carley =

Carley may refer to:

- Carley (name)
- Carley float, a lifeboat design
- Carley Hill, in North East England, United Kingdom
- Carley State Park, in Minnesota, United States

== See also ==
- Carly (disambiguation)
- Kali (disambiguation)
