= Frank Giorgio =

American politician (1878–1944)

Member of the New York State Senate from the 2nd district
- In office January 1, 1923 – December 31, 1924
- Preceded by: John L. Karle
- Succeeded by: John L. Karle

Personal details
- Born: June 5, 1878 Potenza, Italy
- Died: August 15, 1944 (aged 66)
- Resting place: St. John Cemetery, New York City, U.S.
- Party: Democratic
- Spouse: Esther Marsh Hobley (m. 1906)
- Children: 4
- Education: La Salle Academy; St. John's College; New York University
- Occupation: Politician, lawyer, magistrate

Frank Giorgio (June 5, 1878 – August 15, 1944) was an Italian-American lawyer, politician, and magistrate from New York.

== Early life ==
Giorgio was born on June 5, 1878, in Potenza, Italy. He immigrated to America with his parents when he was 3. He lived in Manhattan and Brooklyn until 1908, when he settled in Queens. He lived in Woodhaven for 17 years, and in 1935 he moved to Hollis.

Giorgio attended St. Alphonsus school and La Salle Academy. He graduated from St. John's College in 1899 and studied law at New York University School of Law. He received a law degree in 1903 and was admitted to the bar shortly afterwards. For 3 years he had a law practice with James A. Foley. He later practiced law by himself in Manhattan and Woodhaven.

== Professional career ==
In 1922, Giorgio was elected to the New York State Senate as a Democrat, representing the 2nd District. He served in the Senate in 1923 and 1924. In the Senate, he passed legislation that authorized the construction of the Rockaway Boardwalk, and created a Municipal Court district for the Rockaway area. In 1926, he was appointed a city magistrate for a ten-year term by Mayor Jimmy Walker. In 1936, he was reappointed for another ten-year term by Fiorello La Guardia.

== Personal life ==
In 1906, Giorgio married Esther Marsh Hobley. Their children were Frank Jr., Herbert P., Douglas J., and Mrs. Ruth McDonald. He was a member of the Elks, the Knights of Columbus, and the Queens County Bar Association.

== Death ==
Giorgio died at home on August 15, 1944. He was buried in St. John Cemetery.

New York State Senate
Preceded by John L. Karle	New York State Senate; 2nd District; 1923–1924	Succeeded by John L. Karle
