= Kalina (surname) =

Kalina is a surname. Notable people with the surname include:

- Harold Kalina, American judge and politician
- Jozef Kalina, Slovak basketball player
- Klāra Kaliņa (1874–1964), Latvian feminist, suffragette, editor and politician
- Noah Kalina, American photographer
- Robert Kalina, Austrian banknote designer
- Václav Kalina, Czech footballer

== See also ==
- Kalina (disambiguation)
- Kalina (given name)
- Karlina
