= Karlijn =

Karlijn (Dutch pronunciation: [kɑrˈlɛin]) is a Dutch feminine given name that is a diminutive form of Carolina and Caroline. Notable people with the name include:

- Karlijn Demasure (born 1955), Belgian professor of theology
- Karlijn Swinkels (born 1998), Dutch cyclist

== See also ==
- Carlijn
- Karlin (surname)
