= Kalina (given name) =

- Gender: female

Origin
- Origin: Slavic
- Meaning: kalina ("Viburnum")

Kalina (Cyrillic: Калина) is a feminine given name of Slavic origin meaning "Viburnum".

== Notable bearers ==
- Princess Kalina of Bulgaria (born 1972)
- Kalina Jędrusik (1930–1991), Polish singer and actress
- Kalina Balabanova (born 1990), Bulgarian politician and engineer
- Kalina Trayanov (born 2007), Bulgarian-American rhythmic gymnast

== See also ==
- Kalina (disambiguation)
- Kalina (surname)
