= Kalina =

Kalina may refer to:

== People ==
- Kalina people, or Mainland Caribs, an Indigenous people of the northern coastal areas of South America
- Kalina language, or Mainland Carib, the language of the Kalina people
- Kalina (given name)
- Kalina (surname)
- Noah Kalina, American photographer and creator of Everyday

== Places ==
=== Poland ===
- Kalina, Gniezno County in Greater Poland Voivodeship (west-central Poland)
- Kalina, Konin County in Greater Poland Voivodeship (west-central Poland)
- Kalina, Masovian Voivodeship (east-central Poland)
- Kalina, Silesian Voivodeship (south Poland)
- Kalina, Warmian-Masurian Voivodeship (north Poland)
- Kalina, West Pomeranian Voivodeship (north-west Poland)
- Kalina Mała, Poland

=== Bulgaria ===
- Kalina, Dobrich Province
- Kalina, Vidin Province

=== Other ===
- Kalina, a geographical location in Mumbai
- Kalina, Estonia, village in Alutaguse Parish, Ida-Viru County, Estonia
- Kalina, the former name of Gombe in the Democratic Republic of Congo

== Other uses ==
- Kalina (Vidhan Sabha constituency), Maharashtra, India
- Kalina (whale), the first orca to be born and raised successfully in captivity
- Kalina cycle, a process through which thermodynamic energy is converted to mechanical power
- Lada Kalina, a Russian car
- Project Kalina, a Russian proposed fifth-generation submarine
- SPG Kalina, a Polish tracked vehicle

== See also ==
- Kalyna (disambiguation)
