= Kalyna =

Kalyna may refer to:

- Kalyna (cipher), a symmetric block cipher
- Kalyna Country, a heritage and eco-tourism district in Alberta, Canada
- Viburnum opulus, a species of flowering plant

== People ==
- Kalyna Roberge (born 1986), Canadian short-track speed skater
- Sviatoslav Palamar (born 1982), nicknamed Kalyna, Ukrainian military leader

== See also ==
- Kalina (disambiguation)
