= Stephen F. Burkard =

American lawyer and politician

Stephen Frederick Burkard (May 8, 1897 – August 22, 1957) was an American lawyer and politician from New York.

== Life ==
He was born in 1897 in Brooklyn, to German immigrants. He attended Public School No. 68 in Brooklyn, St. Charles College, Maryland, and the College of St. Thomas in St. Paul, Minnesota. He graduated in absentia from Brooklyn Law School in 1918, while training at Camp Gordon, Georgia, to become a U.S. Army officer. World War I ended before Burkard could serve in the field. In December 1918, he was admitted to the bar, and commenced practice in Ridgewood, Queens.

Burkard was a member of the New York State Senate (2nd D.) from 1927 to 1930, sitting in the 150th, 151st, 152nd and 153rd New York State Legislatures.

In October 1931, his brother Otto H. Burkard (c.1888–1931) died by suicide in Patchogue, New York.

On January 23, 1935, he was arrested at his home in Woodside, Queens, on a bench warrant for first degree grand larceny. Burkard was accused of having appropriated $1,000 which had been given to him by a client in 1932 to buy stock of the Bank of the Manhattan Company. Burkhard neither bought the stock nor returned the money.

New York State Senate
Preceded by John L. Karle	New York State Senate; 2nd District; 1927–1930	Succeeded by Joseph D. Nunan, Jr.
