= Carl Lee =

Carl Lee may refer to:

- Carl Lee (American football), American football player
- Carl Lee (actor) (1926–1986), American actor
- Carl Lee Jr., CEO of Snyder's of Hanover

== See also ==
- Reuben B. CarlLee, state legislator and farmer organizer in Arkansas
- Carlee, the feminine form of Carl or Charles
