= Carleen (given name) =

- Gender: female

Other names
- Related names: Caroline, Carolyn

Carleen is a female given name, a variant form of Caroline or Carolyn, and may also refer to one of the following

== Given name ==
- Carleen Anderson (born 1957), American singer
- Carleen Bright, former mayor of Woodway, Texas, for whom the Carleen Bright Arboretum is named
- Carleen Goodridge of the Brigitte Harris case
- Carleen Hutchins (1911 – 2009), American violin maker

== Middle name ==
- Tiffeny Carleen Milbrett, full name of Tiffeny Milbrett (born 1972), American soccer player
- Andrea Carleen Harrison, full name of Andrea Harrison (born 1963), American politician

== See also ==
- Carlee
- Karleen
