= Karle =

Karle may refer to:

== Places ==
- Karle (Svitavy District), a municipality and village in the Czech Republic
- Karli, India, a town in Maharashtra, India
  - Karla Caves, a complex of Buddhist cave shrines
- Karle, Belgaum, a settlement in Belgaum district, Karnataka, India
- Karle, Chamarajanagar, a settlement in Chamarajanagar district, Karnataka, India
- Karle, Hassan district, a settlement in Hassan district, Karnataka, India

== Other uses ==
- Karle (name), a given name and surname (including a list of persons with the name)
- Karle IF, a Swedish football club

== See also ==
- Karie (disambiguation)
- Karl (disambiguation)
- Carle, a surname (including a list of persons with the name)
- Kahle, a surname (including a list of persons with the name)
