= Karlee =

Karlee is an English feminine given name that is a feminine form of Carl (Karl) and an alternate form of Carla. (Karla) Notable people known by this name include the following:

== Given name ==
- Karlee Bispo (born 1990), American competition swimmer
- Karlee Burgess (born 1998), Canadian curler
- Karlee Macer (born 1971), American politician
- Karlee Perez, known as Catrina (wrestler), (born 1986) is an American actress, model, professional wrestler and valet
- Karlee Tanaka (born 2003), American singer-songwriter and dancer

== See also ==
- Carlee
- Karle (name)
- Karleen
- Karlene
- Karlie
