= Karli Whetstone =

American singer-songwriter

- Origin: Nashville, Tennessee, United States
- Genres: Country
- Occupation(s): Singer, songwriter
- Years active: 2010–present
- Website: http://www.karli.com

Karli Whetstone, born in Ohio, United States, is an American country music writer and singer.

== Career ==
Whetstone began dancing at the age of three and continued dancing through high school. She won championships and competed at the national level for her dancing. Whetstone began classical vocal training at the age of 12, soon entered singing contests and, by the age of 14, was performing with area bands in Ohio.

After graduating high school, Whetstone began to open shows for big-name acts in Nashville, including Taylor Swift, Phil Vassar, Darryl Worley, and Joe Nichols.

Whetstone released her self-titled four-song EP, as well as the regional hit single "Ohio" in 2011. "Ohio" was adopted by Ohio State head football coach Jim Tressel being played for over 100,000 people in Ohio Stadium during every home game.

She is also often featured in local media in the Nashville area presenting her recipes, such as her Leprechaun Cake.

In 2015, Whetstone released her music video for "Frozen," directed by Roman White.

In 2016, she released the Country Enough – EP, produced by Tone Def. It features six songs including "Blow It Up."

== Personal life ==
Whetstone is currently married to Doug Datish.

== Discography ==
Album	Year released
Country Enough – EP	2016
Karli – EP	2012
I Didn't	2011
I'm Having a Good Day	2011
Ohio	2012
Climbing Up Mount Everest	2011
Did You Know?	2011
