= Karla Zadnik =

Karla Zadnik is an American optometrist. She is the dean of the Ohio State University College of Optometry.

== Biography ==
An internationally recognized leader in optometric research and education, Dr. Karla Zadnik became The Ohio State University College of Optometry's dean in June 2014. She received her OD and PhD degrees from the University of California Berkeley School of Optometry and is a Fellow of the American Academy of Optometry. Professional highlights include: American Academy of Optometry President (2011–12): American Optometric Foundation Glenn A. Fry Award Recipient (1995); National Advisory Eye Council of the National Eye Institute (NEI)/National Institutes of Health (2000–04); Study Chair for the NEI-funded Collaborative Longitudinal Evaluation of Ethnicity and Refractive Error (CLEERE) Study; and chair of the first-ever NEI-funded multicenter study based in optometry, the Collaborative Longitudinal Evaluation of Keratoconus (CLEK) Study (1994-2007). At the Ohio State University, she has chaired the Biomedical Sciences Institutional Review Board (IRB) for more than 15 years, and received The Ohio State University's Distinguished Scholar Award in 2010. She stepped down as dean on June 30, 2026 to take a 10-month sabbatical, followed by a return to the faculty.
