= Carly Phillips =

American romance novelist and attorney

Karen Drogin
- Born: July 7, 1965 (age 61); New York, U.S.
- Occupation: novelist
- Writing career
- Pen name: Carly Phillips
- Period: 1998–present
- Genre: romance
- Website: www.carlyphillips.com

Karen Drogin (born July 7, 1965), known professionally by the pen name Carly Phillips, is an American author and former attorney. Phillips has written seventy-five romance novels.

== Awards ==
- Waldenbooks Bestselling Author Award
- Oklahoma Romance Writers of America National Readers' Choice Award
- Virginia Romance Writers of America's Holt Medallion
- Greater Detroit Romance Writers of America Booksellers' Best
- Dorothy Parker Award for Excellence

== Bibliography ==
=== Simply series ===
- Simply Sinful (2000)
- Simply Scandalous (2000)
- Simply Sensual (2001)
- Body Heat (2001)
- Simply Sexy (2002)

=== Hot zone series ===
- Hot Stuff (2004)
- Hot Number (2005)
- Hot Item (2006)
- Hot Property (June 24, 2008) (last of the "Hot Zone" Series)

=== Stand alone novels ===
- Brazen (1999)
- Secret Fantasy (2001)
- Erotic Invitation (2001)
- Seduce Me (2008) (reprint of Erotic Invitation)

=== Corwin curse series ===
- Lucky Charm (October 2008)
- Lucky Streak (June 2009)
- Lucky Break (September 2009)

=== Costas sister series ===
- Under the Boardwalk (2004)
- Summer Lovin' (2005)

=== Ty & Hunter series ===
- Cross My Heart (2006)
- Sealed With A Kiss (2007)

=== Chandler brothers series ===
- The Bachelor (2002)
- The Playboy (2003)
- The Heartbreaker (2003)

=== Written As Karen Drogin ===
- Perfect Partners (1999)
- The Right Choice (2000)
- Solitary Man (2000)

=== The Bachelor Blog Series ===
- Kiss Me If You Can ( 2010)
- Love Me If You Dare (2010)

=== Serendipity ===
- Serendipity (2011)
- Destiny (2012)
- Karma (2012)
- Kismet (novella)

=== Dare to Love Series ===
- Dare to Love (2013)
- Dare to Desire (2014)
- Dare to Surrender (2014)(New York Dare Cousin's)
- Dare to Submit (2014)(New York Dared Cousin's)
- Dare to Touch (2015)
- Dare to Hold (2015)
- Dare to Rock (2015)
- Dare to Seduce (2015)(New York Dare Cousin's)
- Dare to Take (May 3, 2016 on Google Play

UNRELEASED

- Dare to Want
- Dare to Pleasure
- Dare to Dream

=== Omnibus ===
- Naughty or Nice? (2001) (with Sherrilyn Kenyon, Patricia Ryan and Kathryn Smith)
- Invitations to Seduction (2003) (with Janelle Denison and Vicki Lewis Thompson)
- Stroke of Midnight (2004) (with Jacquie D'Alessandro, Janelle Denison)
- Skin Tight / Hot Number (2005) (with Susan Andersen)
- Undone: Going All the Way / Her Secret Thrill / Good Time Girl (2005) (with Donna Kauffman and Candace Schuler)
- Santa, Baby (2006) (with Jennifer Cruise, Lori Foster)

== Internet meme ==
Starting in 2011 an internet meme featuring a picture of Phillips spread online called the Sheltering Suburban Mom; the captions on the image typically illustrated the perceived out-of-touch double standards suburban mothers hold against their children or their peers. Phillips herself was initially unaware of the meme itself; when it was first brought to her attention she claims to have been distressed, thinking it was about herself, not the archetype; she came to understand the joke now and claims she is nothing like the supposed suburban mothers.
