= Kärla =

Village in Estonia

- Small borough
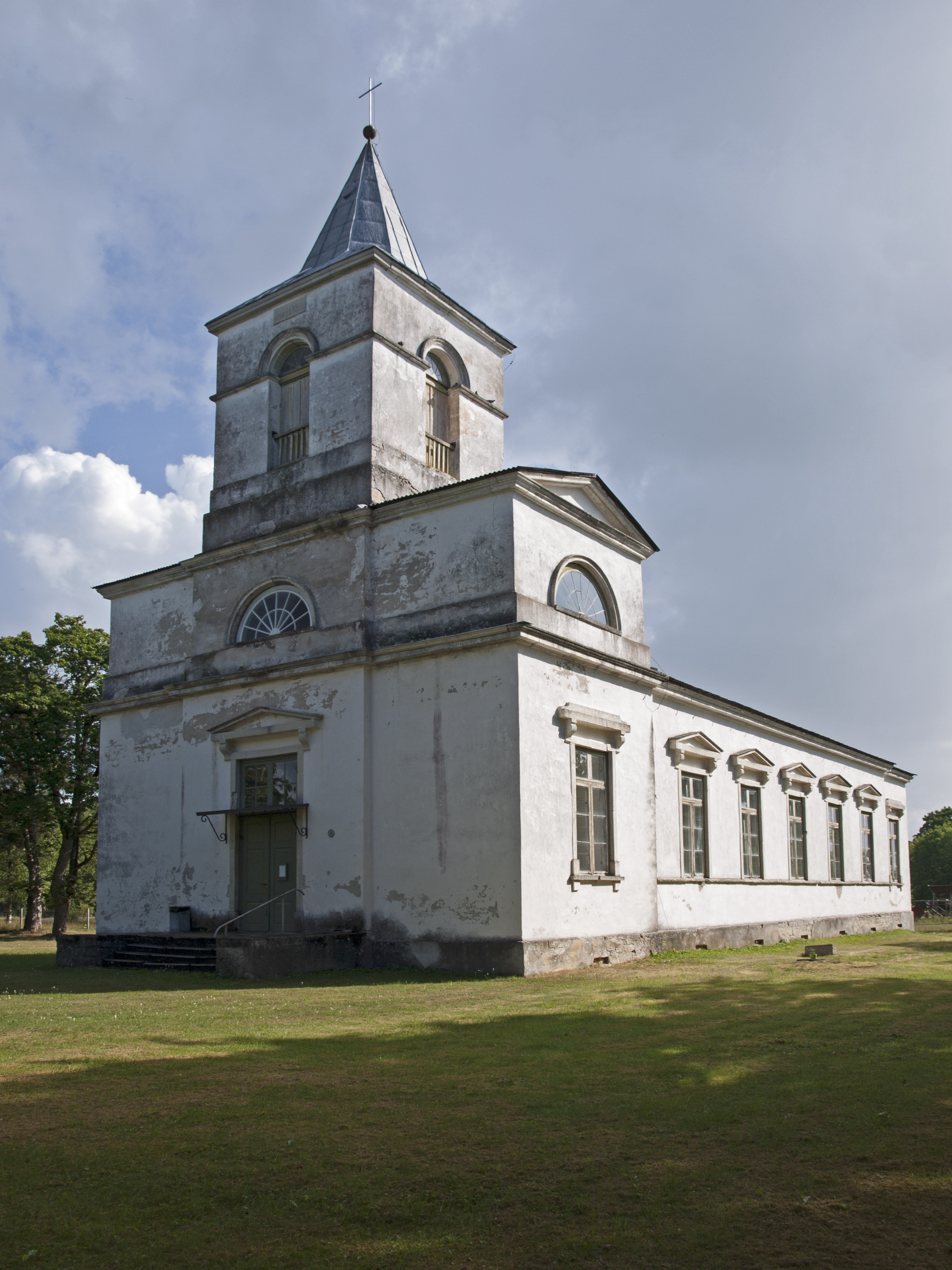
- Kärla Mary Magdalene Church

- Location within Estonia
- Coordinates: 58°20′N 22°16′E
- Country: Estonia
- County: Saare County
- Parish: Saaremaa Parish
- Time zone: UTC+2 (EET)
  - Summer (DST): UTC+3 (EEST)

Kärla (German: Kergel) is a small borough (Estonian: alevik) in Saaremaa Parish, Saare County in western Estonia.

Before 2015, Kärla was the administrative centre of Kärla Parish.

== Notable persons ==
- Ott Tänak (born 1987), rally driver, the 2019 World Champion, was born and grew up in Kärla.
