= Carlee Fernández =

Latina-American artist

- Born: 1973 (age 52–53); Santa Ana, California
- Occupations: Sculptor and photographer
- Children: Two

Carlee Fernández (born 1973) is a sculptor and photographer known for her investigations of identity and power through self-portraits and altered taxidermies.

== Biography ==
Fernández was born in Santa Ana, California in 1973. Being half-Mexican and half-European, she has described having unstable cultural experiences. She was also raised in Europe. Now, Fernández has a husband and two children whom are referenced in several of her works.

== Art ==
=== Bear Studies (2004) ===
==== Bear Study (2004) ====
Fernández believes all animals, including humans, hold great power and elegance. In this respect, her taxidermy efforts are meant as homages to the animals. In many of her works, she honors the bear as an emblem of self-empowerment and unbridled masculinity. For Bear Study (2004), she fully suits up inside of a taxidermied bear.

==== Bear Hair Study (2004) ====
In this piece, Fernández takes a self-portrait wearing a “mustache” achieved by placing tufts of bear fur into her nostrils. Bear Hair Study (2004) was collected by the National Portrait Gallery and featured in their traveling exhibition, Portraiture Now: Staging the Self.

=== Domestic Odyssey (2004) ===
Her series entitled Friends is a body of taxidermy works from which the San Jose Museum of Art selected for their exhibit. She was featured in Domestic Odyssey (2004) under one of its six subdivisions, Desperately Seeking Something . The show took place from March 6 to July 3. Fernández shapes animals into everyday objects such as furniture and utility objects. Her sculpture Lola Isern (2001) melds a goat with a shopping basket. According to the exhibition catalogue, this practice visualizes the totality of consumerism over nature. Lola Isern is also used for the front cover of the catalogue.

=== Man (2006) ===
==== Self Portrait: Portrait of my Father as Manuel Fernández (2006) ====
Fernández's art explores masculinity through works wherein she casts herself as male subjects. In her series Man (2006), she embodies masculine figures in various modes. Self Portrait: Portrait of my Father, Manuel Fernández is currently in the possession of the Los Angeles County Museum of Art (LACMA) which has included her works in several exhibitions. This piece was featured in Phantom Sightings: Art After the Chicano Movement. Pictured are two gelatin silver prints of a photo of her father and a self-portrait as her father. Fernández describes her strive for a replica, having to paint the stripes onto her shirt. She leaves out his mustache to show the critical role of facial hair in machismo symbology. She sought out her father in a time of irresolution, wanting to manifest his fortitude.

==== Self Portrait as Franz West (2006) ====
In Self Portrait as Franz West (2006), Fernández takes on the face of the sculptor whom, like her father, she considers a compelling entity. This work was also featured in LACMA’s Phantom Sightings exhibit.
