= Carl, West Virginia =

Unincorporated community in West Virginia, United States

Carl
- Unincorporated community
- Location within the state of West Virginia
- Coordinates: 38°06′38″N 80°41′04″W
- Country: United States
- State: West Virginia
- County: Nicholas
- Elevation: 2,815 ft (858 m)
- Time zone: UTC-5 (Eastern (EST))
  - Summer (DST): UTC-4 (EDT)
- GNIS feature ID: 1554073

Carl is an unincorporated community in Nicholas County, in the U.S. state of West Virginia.

== History ==
A post office called Carl was established in 1907, and remained in operation until 1952. The community was named after the child of a local postmaster.
