= Charles Horton =

Charles, Charlie, or Charley Horton may refer to:

- Charley Horton (halfback) (born 1935), American football player
- Charley Horton (guard) (1936–2013), American football player
- Charlie Horton (born 1994), American soccer player
