= UC Berkeley School of Optometry =

UC Berkeley Optometry school

Herbert Wertheim School of Optometry and Vision Science
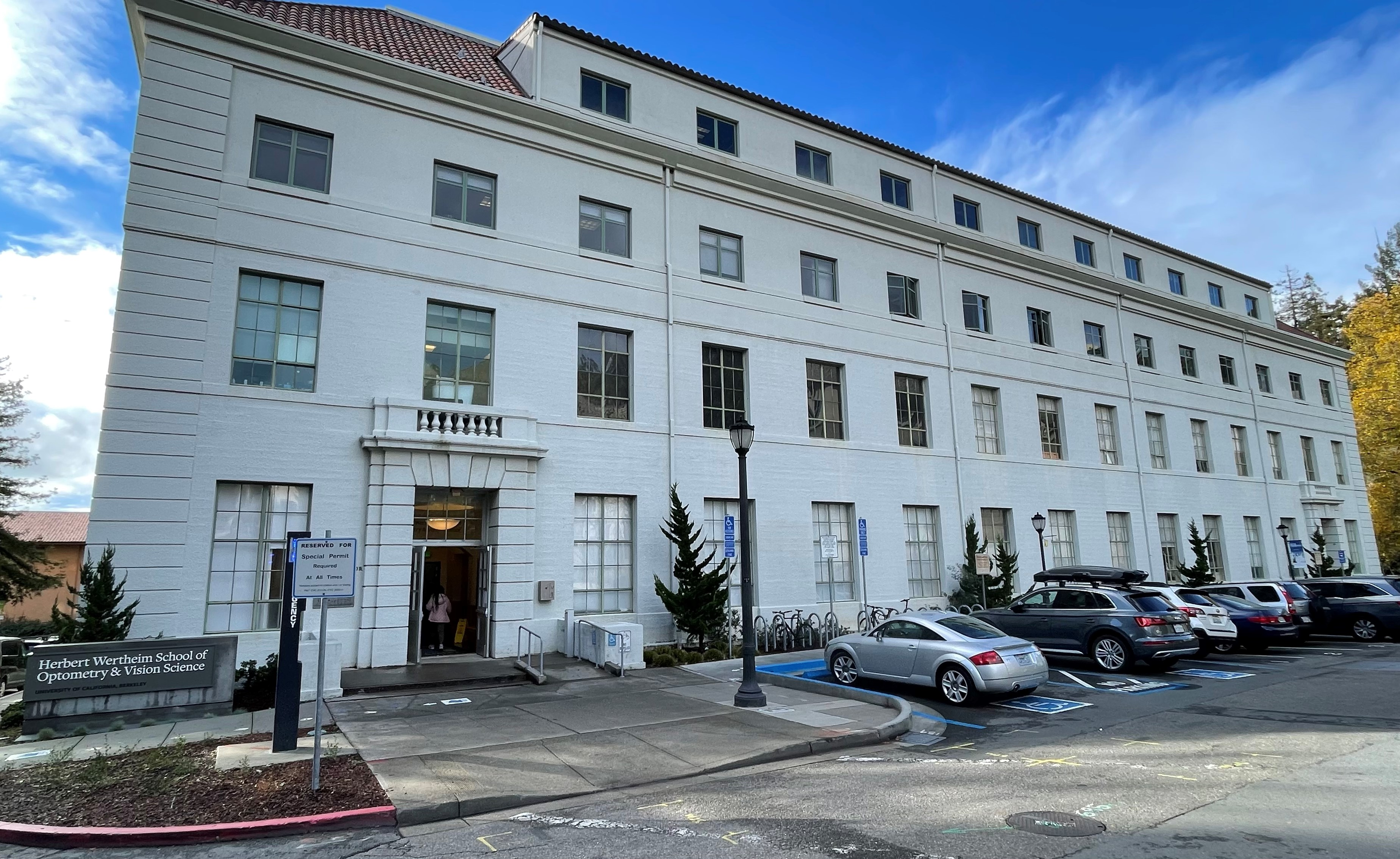
- Ralph S. Minor Hall, which houses Berkeley Optometry and Vision Science
- Former name: UC Berkeley School of Optometry
- Type: Public professional school
- Established: 1923
- Location: Berkeley, California, United States; 37°52′17.32″N 122°15′16.83″W
- Website: optometry.berkeley.edu

The UC Berkeley School of Optometry, formally known the Herbert Wertheim School of Optometry and Vision Science, is an optometry school at the University of California, Berkeley. It offers a graduate-level, four-year professional program leading to the Doctor of Optometry degree (OD), and a one-year, ACOE-accredited residency program in clinical optometry specialties (primary care, ocular disease, contact lenses, low vision, binocular vision, and pediatrics). It is also the home department for the multidisciplinary Vision Science Group at UC Berkeley, whose graduate students earn either MS or PhD degrees.

The school is named after optometrist Herbert Wertheim, who pledged US$50 million to the school in 2021 along with his wife Nicole Wertheim through the Dr. Herbert and Nicole Wertheim Family Foundation.

== Clinical optometry program ==
=== Clinical training ===
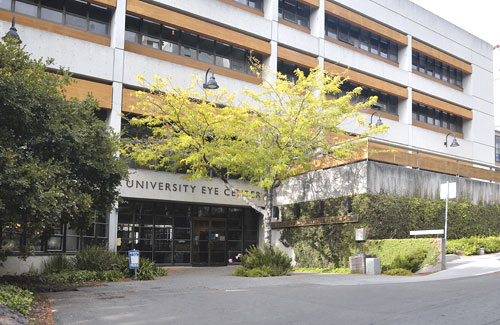
View of the south entrance to the Meredith Morgan University Eye Center, Minor Addition, University of California, Berkeley

The curriculum at Berkeley Optometry is designed to provide clinical optometric training as well as instruction in the science of vision. Students are trained to be primary eye and vision care providers, which includes comprehensive eye examinations and the diagnosis, treatment, and management of most eye conditions and diseases. Applicants to Berkeley Optometry must have a bachelor's degree and complete undergraduate general science courses (biology; general, organic, and biochemistry; mathematics, statistics, physics, anatomy, physiology, microbiology, immunology, and psychology).

Berkeley Optometry operates its teaching clinics on a twelve-month basis. Students begin their training full-time in the first year with vision science and optometry courses. They are also enrolled in preclinical laboratories in years 1–2, beginning their training on the first day of the first year. Students have their initial clinic supervision in direct patient care in the summer following their second year. Third-year students continue to take didactic instruction but spend more than half their time in clinical training and direct patient care. Third and fourth-year students also participate in off-campus community outreach programs through which they provide vision care services in satellite clinics to serve segments of the local population who have limited access to health care due to lack of health insurance, low income, disability, or other restrictions. Fourth-year students train full-time in clinical rotations locally and throughout the United States.

== Advanced degree programs ==
=== Berkeley Optometry residency program ===
Berkeley Optometry established its first off-campus residency program in 1978 when it affiliated with the Kansas City Veterans Administration Medical Center. The inaugural on-campus residency training program began in 1983. The program provides each resident with mentored postgraduate education and clinical training in one or two specialty areas of optometric practice. On-campus residents are expected to treat patients and teach or supervise in general or specialty clinics. They also have teaching responsibilities and must give case presentations, as well as submit publishable-quality clinical case or research papers.

=== Joint residency/masters in vision science program ===
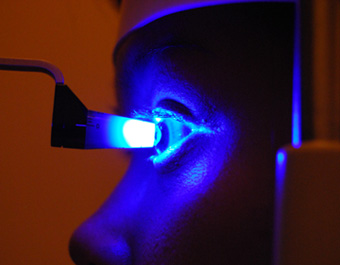
Closeup view of tonometry (measurement of intraocular pressure) during a comprehensive eye examination

In 2010 Berkeley Optometry established its first Joint Residency/MS Program by offering a two-year master's degree (MS). Designed for optometry residents, the Joint Residency/MS in Vision Science Program prepares clinicians for careers in teaching, academic and industry research, and private practice. Postdoctoral (post-OD) students complete an Optometry Residency and a Master's research thesis. In the first year, OD residents focus on advanced clinical education and concentrated clinical experience in one of the program specialty areas. During the second year, residents move from patient care to the laboratory to continue their research project under the supervision of Vision Science faculty. Upon completion, residents receive an Optometry Residency Certificate and an MS in Vision Science.

=== Vision Science Graduate Program ===
The Physiological Optics Graduate Program (since 1989 called Vision Science Graduate Program) began in 1946, granting its first MS and PhD degrees in 1950. The program has expanded significantly in the last few decades, as the array of new scientific inquiry included fields such as neurobiology, cell biology, infectious disease, bioengineering, molecular genetics, and adaptive optics. Advances in understanding the brain and the visual system, along with substantial improvements in instrumentation, account for many of these advances in vision science. As the host school for vision science research and graduate studies on the University of California, Berkeley campus, Berkeley Optometry has didactic and research affiliations with faculty and students in departments such as public health, electrical engineering and computer science, bioengineering, molecular and cell biology, neuroscience, psychology, chemistry, and chemical engineering.

=== Berkeley Clinical Scientist Development Program ===
Berkeley Optometry is funded by the National Eye Institute (National Institutes of Health) in support of post-doctoral training in clinical research. Thus trainees in the Berkeley Clinical Scientist Development Program (BCSDP) have professional clinical degrees (e.g., OD, MD, DO, DVM, DDS, or equivalent). In the BCSDP, professional trainees work under one or more mentors who are from departments and research groups on the University of California Berkeley and San Francisco campuses, in areas such as Vision Science, Optometry, Public Health, Neuroscience, Ophthalmology, Infectious Disease, Bioengineering, Chemistry, Health & Medical Science, and Molecular & Cell Biology.

=== Specialized pre- and post-doctoral training in the Clinical Research Center ===
The University of California Clinical Research Center (UCB-CRC) in the School of Optometry works with industry, foundations, and government to design and evaluate innovations in patient vision care. The UCB-CRC operates an interdisciplinary program that combines clinical research, basic science, epidemiology, and patient care. The center relies upon clinicians and faculty from various scientific and research disciplines at the University of California, Berkeley, including Optometry, Vision Science, Public Health, Bioengineering, Chemistry, Psychology, Neuroscience, Molecular & Cellular Biology, Genetics, and Physics. The UCB-CRC provides advanced training for ODs, Residents, MDs, PhDs, and OD students. Pre-doctoral training positions for optometry students are available in a wide array of research areas, including pharmaceuticals, optics, and functional vision assessment and enhancement. Post-doctoral opportunities for clinicians and researchers in advanced training in clinical research include clinical study design & methodology, and data management & analysis.

== Founding and brief history ==
=== Early years ===
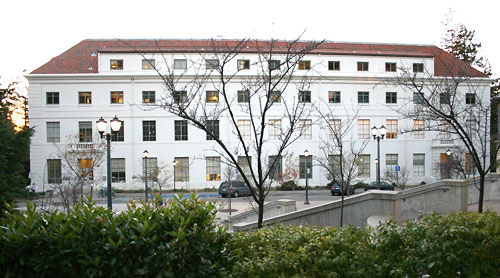
Westward view of the east side of Ralph S. Minor Hall, School of Optometry, University of California, Berkeley. Built in 1941, the top two floors were added in 1992–1993 to provide modern office and laboratory facilities.

The optometry program at the University of California, Berkeley began in 1923, making it the third university optometry program established in the United States (and second-oldest active university optometry program). A curriculum in optometry at the University of California was first proposed by a visionary Berkeley optometrist named George L. Schneider (1874–1928). Schneider was a leader in the profession, having been elected president of the California State Association of Optometrists (CSAO, forerunner of the California Optometric Association) in 1910 and president of the American Optical Association (forerunner of American Optometric Association) in 1911 and 1912. In 1907 he chaired a committee of three optometrists appointed by the CSAO who met with Benjamin Ide Wheeler, president of the University of California, about establishing a "Course in the Science of Optometry." This would be the first of more than 100 meetings between optometrists led by Schneider and the university, comprising an arduous sixteen-year campaign, finally ending when optometry courses became part of the upper division curriculum (undergraduate years 3–4) within the Department of Physics on August 17, 1923. The first head of the curriculum (later the first dean) was Ralph S. Minor, a professor of physics.

While still housed in Le Conte Hall (Physics), Optometry became an independent department in 1939 and a school in 1941. The program was given its first building (completed in 1941, formerly named Durant Hall) in 1948; partial occupancy began in 1949 after initial renovations were finished. The Optometry Library was also established in 1949 within the Optometry Building as a branch of the main University library. Complete occupancy of the Optometry Building was achieved in 1953 following stage-2 renovations. Approval for a second building was granted in the 1970s, culminating in Minor Addition in 1978. Two additional floors were added in 1992–1993.

=== History of optometry degrees ===
Initially, from 1925 to 1928, students completed a four-year undergraduate program with a BS degree in physics and a Certificate in Optometry (COpt), the latter qualifying graduates for California State optometry licensing examinations. In 1929, the major was revised to Physics-Optometry with a terminal degree of BS in Physics-Optometry (+ COpt). After Optometry became a school in 1941, the connection with the Physics curriculum was severed and the next graduating class in 1942 received a BS in Optometry (+ COpt). When a graduate-level (5th) year was added in the 1950–1951 academic year, graduates of the class of 1951 received a Master's in Optometry (MOpt + COpt). The MOpt degree continued until 1969, although in 1966, yet another (6th) year of graduate training was approved by the Regents of the University of California. During the transition from 1966 to 1969, a few students of high academic standing were allowed to complete the additional (then optional) sixth year for the first-ever Doctor of Optometry (OD) degrees awarded by the University of California. The first entire class to receive OD degrees graduated in 1970, after completing four undergraduate years and two graduate years. Completion of an undergraduate degree (BS or BA) became a prerequisite for admission in 2002, and in 2003, the Optometry curriculum became part of the University of California Graduate Division as a four-year professional doctoral-level program.

=== Notable faculty and alumni ===
- Karla Zadnik
