= Carlijn Bouten =

Dutch university teacher

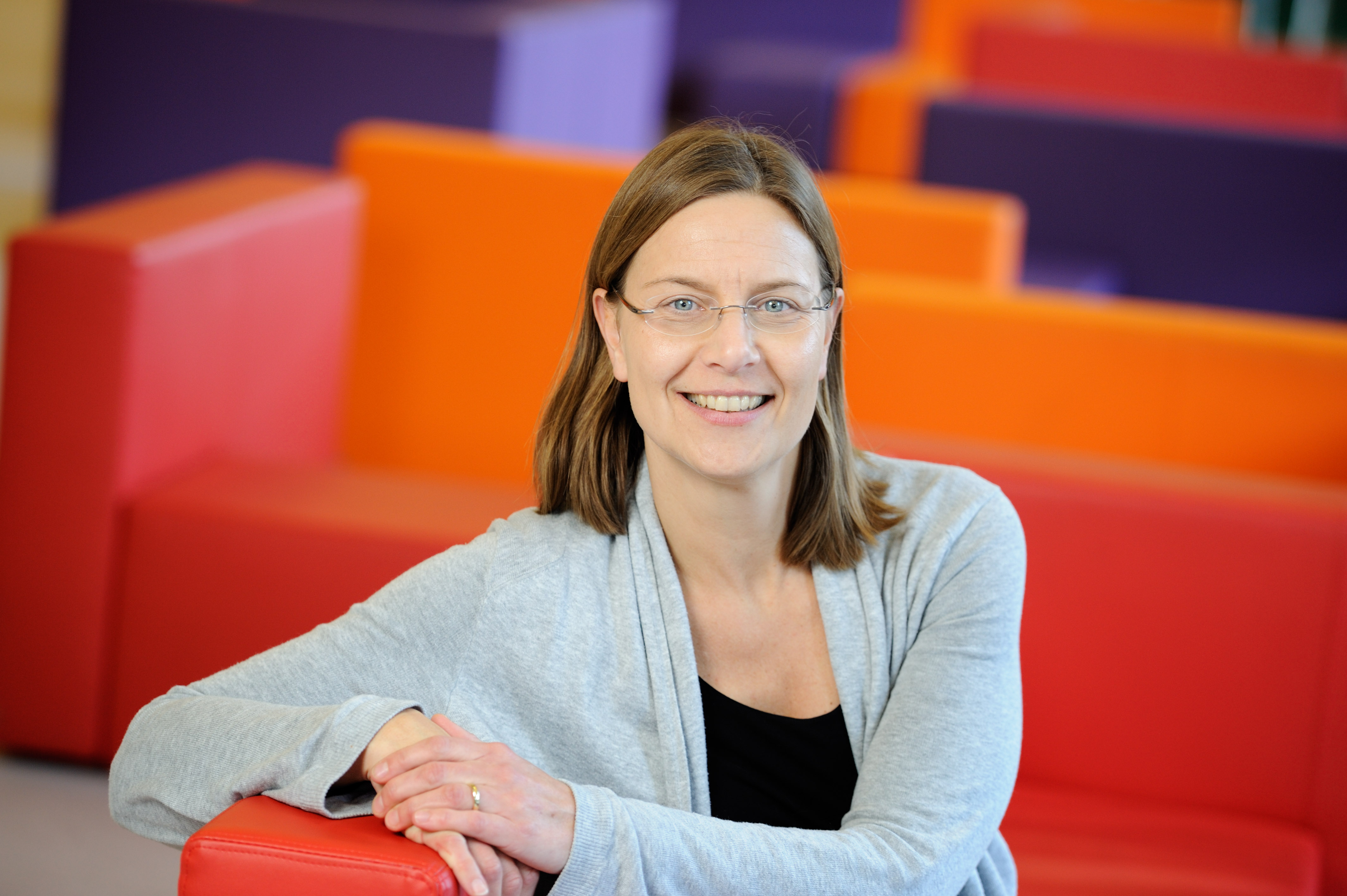
Carlijn Bouten (2011)

Carlijn V.C. Bouten (born 1967) is a Dutch professor of Cell-Matrix Interactions at the department of Biomedical Engineering of Eindhoven University of Technology since 2010. She specializes in tissue engineering.

Bouten studied functional anatomy, biomechanics and exercise physiology at the Vrije Universiteit Amsterdam and obtained her MsC there in 1991. In 1995 she obtained her PhD at Eindhoven University of Technology. In 1998 she became assistant professor of Cellular Biomechanics and in 2002 associate professor of tissue engineering. In 2010 she became full professor.

In 2016, Bouten was awarded a prize for her work in materials-driven regeneration by the Dutch Government's Gravitation program.

One of her research projects is the growing of heart valve inside the human body.

Bouten was elected a member of the Royal Netherlands Academy of Arts and Sciences in 2017.
