= Carly Ealey =

American painter

Carly Ealey is an artist from San Diego, California who is best known for her mural installations. Ealey has created several large-scale murals around the world, including in the United States, Mexico, Canada and New Zealand. Her work often features women, the ocean, and celestial objects.

== Biography ==
Ealey was born in Palm Springs, California but moved to San Diego as a young adult. Ealey is a self-taught artist who primarily creates art via photography, paintings and murals. Her work often depicts women, the ocean, celestial objects, and other aspects of the human experience or the natural world. For small paintings, she prefers acrylic ink on wood panels. For murals, she uses a combination of aerosol and spray paint. She has created several large-scale murals in California, including in Del Mar, Encinitas, Los Angeles, and Imperial Beach. She also has created murals in Denver, Colorado; Tijuana, Mexico; Edmonton, Canada; and Napier, New Zealand. She has coordinated some of her art installation projects with the non-profit organization Sezio, which she co-founded.
