= Carleigh =

Carleigh is a given name. Notable people with the name include:

- Carleigh Baker (fl. 21st century), Canadian writer
- Carleigh Williams (born 1992), American football player

== See also ==
- Karleigh Osborne (born 1988), English football player and manager
