= Eupithecia karli =

Scientific classification
- Kingdom: Animalia
- Phylum: Arthropoda
- Clade: Pancrustacea
- Class: Insecta
- Order: Lepidoptera
- Family: Geometridae
- Genus: Eupithecia
- Species: E. karli

Binomial name
- Eupithecia karli Mironov & Ratzel, 2008

Species of moth

Eupithecia karli is a moth in the family Geometridae. It is found in Kashmir.

The wingspan is about 19–20 mm. The fore- and hindwings are grey or pale grey.
