= Charles Y. Kaneshiro =

American politician

Member of the Hawaii House of Representatives
- In office 1971–1972

Personal details
- Born: February 20, 1938 Paia, Hawaii, U.S.
- Died: March 15, 2002 (aged 64)
- Party: Democratic
- Education: University of Hawaiʻi

Charles Y. Kaneshiro (February 20, 1938 – March 15, 2002) was an American educator, business executive, and politician. A member of the Democratic Party, he served in the Hawaii House of Representatives from 1971 to 1972, representing the 14th district on Oahu.

== Life and career ==
Kaneshiro was born in Paia, Hawaii. He attended the University of Hawaiʻi.

Kaneshiro served as a Democratic member of the Hawaii House of Representatives during the 1971–1972 legislature. In the 1971 session, he was vice chairman of the House Committee on Lands.

Outside politics, Kaneshiro worked as an educator and manager and later became president of First Hawaiʻi Title Corp. In May 2001, The Honolulu Advertiser reported that Lester G. L. Wong had succeeded him as president of the company and that Kaneshiro remained on its staff as a special adviser.

Kaneshiro lived in Aiea in his later years. He died on March 15, 2002, at the age of 64.
