= Karl (given name) =

Name list

Karl is a Germanic male given name.

It comes from Old High German, meaning 'man, husband, freeman' and was widely popularised in Central and Northern Europe by its status as a royal name, in particular through the Frankish king Charlemagne. It is popular in Germany, Austria, and Switzerland, and was popularized by German-speaking descendants in the United States. Carl is another spelling of the name, and is popular in Nordic countries such as Denmark, Estonia, Finland, Norway and Sweden and largely popularized in the United States by Scandinavian and Italian (shortened from "Carlo") descendants. The name is a variant of the English Charles, and the Latin Carolus.

Notable people with the name include:

== Nobles ==
- Karl der Große (German for 'Charles the Great'), also known as Karolus Magnus in Latin and Charlemagne in French, (747–814), a Frankish King and the first Emperor of the Holy Roman Empire
- Karl, Truchsess von Waldburg (1548–1593), Imperial minister
- Karl, Count Chotek of Chotkow and Wognin (1783–1868), Austrian chancellor, Government President and school reformer of Bohemia
- Karl, Duke of Schleswig-Holstein-Sonderburg-Glücksburg (1813–1878), German duke
- Karl, Prince of Isenburg-Büdingen (1838–1899), head of the German house of Isenburg and Büdingen
- Karl, Freiherr von Prel (1839–1899), German philosopher and writer on mysticism and the occult
- Karl I of Austria (1887–1922), the last Emperor of Austria
- Karl, 8th Prince of Löwenstein-Wertheim-Rosenberg (1904–1990), German Roman Catholic nobleman

== Given name ==
- Karl Abraham (1877–1925), German psychoanalyst
- Karl Albrecht (1920–2014), German entrepreneur
- Karl Allen (1931–2015), American neo-Nazi
- Karl Auerbach (born 1949), American computer scientist
- Karl Barth (1886–1968), Swiss Reformed Theologian
- Karl Bartos (born 1952), German musician
- Karl Becker (painter) (1820–1900), German painter
- Karl Becker (philologist) (1775–1849), German philologist
- Karl Heinrich Emil Becker (1879–1940), German general
- Karl Beckersachs (1886–1951), German actor
- Karl Benz (1844–1929), German engineer
- Karl Berggren, American electrical engineer
- Karl Böhm (1894–1981), Austrian conductor
- Karl von In der Maur (1852–1913), Austrian statesman
- Karl Blossfeldt (1865–1932), German artist
- Karl Böhm (1894–1981), Austrian conductor
- Karl Bonatz (1882–1951), German architect
- Karl Brandt (1904–1948), German Nazi SS physician
- Karl Ferdinand Braun (1850–1918), German electrical engineer
- Karl Bryullov (1799–1852), Russian painter
- Karl Brooks (born 2000), American football player
- Karl Brugger (1941–1984), German foreign correspondent and author
- Karl Chmielewski, German Nazi SS concentration camp commandant
- Karl Kendrick Chua (born 1978), Filipino economist
- Karl Collins, British actor
- Karl Cook (born 1990), American show jumper
- Karl Dall (1941–2020), German comedian and singer
- Karl Davies (born 1982), English actor
- Karl Dawson, British Virgin Islands politician
- Karl Denke (1860–1924), German serial killer
- Karl Ludwig Diehl (1896–1958), German actor
- Karl Dönitz (1891–1980), German admiral
- Karl Drews (1920–1963), American baseball player
- Karl Duldig (1902–1986), Austrian-Australian sculptor
- Karl Etlinger (1879–1946), German actor
- Karl Farmer (born 1954), American football player
- Karl Fazer (1866–1932), Finnish businessman and sport shooter
- Karl Fritzsch (1903–1945), German Nazi SS concentration camp commandant
- Karl Gebhardt (1897–1948), German Nazi SS physician
- Karl Glusman (born 1988), American actor
- Karl Göbel (1900–1945), Nazi Germany general
- Karl Hammes (1896–1939), German operatic baritone and fighter pilot
- Karl Hannemann (1895–1953), German actor
- Karl Harst (1492–1563), German diplomat
- Karl Amadeus Hartmann (1905–1963), German composer
- Karl Haushofer (1869–1946), German geopolitician
- Karl Hess (1923–1994), American comedian
- Karl Hepp (1889–1970), German agrarian politician
- Karl Hoblitzelle (1879–1967), American theater owner
- Karl-Friedrich Höcker (1911–2000), German Nazi SS concentration camp officer
- Karl Holz (Nazi) (1895–1945), German Nazi
- Karl Hyde (born 1957), English musician
- Karl Jacobs (born 1998), American streamer and YouTuber
- Karl Guthe Jansky (1905–1950), American physicist and radio engineer
- Karl Jaspers (1883–1969), German philosopher
- Karl Joseph (born 1993), American football player
- Karl Kalkun (1927–1990), Estonian actor
- Karl Kassulke (1941–2008), American football player
- Karl Heinrich Kaufhold (1932–2020), German economic historian
- Karl Keating (born 1950), American Catholic apologist
- Karl Kipp (1865–1925), Russian pianist and teacher
- Karl Klug (born 1988), American football player
- Karl Kneidinger (1882–1952), Austrian actor
- Karl-Otto Koch (1897–1945), German Nazi commandant
- Karl Kraus (writer) (1874–1936), Austrian writer
- Karl Christian Friedrich Krause (1781–1832), German philosopher
- Karl Kruszelnicki (born 1948), Australian television and radio personality
- Karl Künstler (1901–1945), German Nazi SS concentration camp commandant
- Karl Lagerfeld (1933–2019), German fashion designer
- Karl Landsteiner (1868–1943), Austrian biologist and physician
- Karl Lauterbach (born 1963), German politician
- Karl Lehmann (1936–2018), German Catholic prelate
- Karl Lehmann (archaeologist) (1894–1960), American art historian
- Karl Linnas (1919–1987), Estonian Nazi concentration camp commandant
- Karl Lucas (born 1972), English actor and comedian
- Karl Malden (1912–2009), American actor
- Karl Malone (born 1963), American basketball player
- Karl Maron (1903–1975), German politician
- Karl Max, Prince Lichnowsky (1860–1928), German diplomat
- Karl Marx (1818–1883), Prussian philosopher
- Karl Mecklenburg (born 1960), American football player
- Karl Möckel (1901–1948), German Nazi SS officer
- Karl Moik (1938–2015), Austrian TV presenter and singer
- Karl Nehammer (born 1972), Austrian politician
- Karl Neumeister (1903–1990), Austrian equestrian
- Karl Nissen (1879–1920), Norwegian journalist and conductor
- Karl Olive (born 1969), French sports journalist and politician
- Karl Olson (1930–2010), American baseball player
- Karl von Oberkamp (1893–1947), German SS commander
- Karl Parkinson, Irish author
- Karl Pearson (1857–1936), English statistician
- Karl Petrén (1868–1927), Swedish physician
- Karl Pilkington (born 1972), English podcaster and author
- Karl Platen (1877–1952), German actor
- Karl Popper (1902–1994), Austrian/British philosopher
- Karl Power, British prankster
- Karl Rahm (1907–1947), German SS officer
- Karl Rapp (1882–1962), German engineer
- Karl Rove (born 1950), American political advisor
- Karl Roy (1968–2012), Filipino rock singer
- Karl Schiewerling (1951–2021), German politician
- Karl Silfverberg (1899–1978), Swedish Air Force major general
- Karl Heinz Schnell (1915–2013), German jet pilot during WW II
- Karl Eberhard Schöngarth (1903–1946), German Nazi SS war criminal
- Karl Schädler (1804–1872), President of the Landtag of Liechtenstein
- Karl Shiels (1971–2019), Irish actor
- Karl Schlyter (1879–1959), Swedish jurist and politician
- Karl Schuberth (1811–1863), German composer and cellist
- Karl Singer (born 1943), American football player
- Karl Söllner, (1903–1986), German-Austrian chemist
- Karl Stefanovic (born 1971), Australian television presenter
- Karl Steubl (1910–1945), Nazi war criminal
- Karl Streibel (1903–1986), German Nazi SS concentration camp commandant
- Karl Svoboda (rugby union) (born 1962), Canadian rugby union footballer
- Karl Svoboda (politician) (1929–2022), Austrian politician
- Karl Tabouret (born 2003), French Paralympic Nordic skier
- Karl O. Thomas (born 1963), United States Navy vice admiral
- Karl Uchermann (1855–1940), Norwegian painter and illustrator
- Karl Ude (1906–1997), German journalist
- Karl Ugland (1886–1966), Norwegian politician
- Karl Uhle (1887–1969), German footballer
- Karl Uhlirz (1854–1914), Austrian historian and archivist
- Karl Ullmann (1796–1865), German Calvinist theologian
- Karl Ullrich (1910–1996), SS officer & last commander of the SS Division Wiking
- Karl Christian Ulmann (1793–1871), Baltic German theologian
- Karl Heinrich Ulrichs (1825–1895), German gay rights activist and promoter of Living Latin
- Karl Umrigar (1960–1979), Indian jockey
- Karl Unterkircher (1970-2008), Italian mountaineer
- Karl Urban (born 1972), New Zealand actor
- Karl Urban (aviator) (1894–1918), Austro-Hungarian aviator
- Karl von Urban (1802–1877), Austrian field marshal-lieutenant
- Karl Arne Utgård (born 1951), Norwegian judge
- Karl Utsar (born 1945), Estonian weightlifter
- Karl Virtanen (born 1971), Swedish-Finnish journalist
- Karl Edward Wagner (1945–1994), American writer, editor and publisher
- Karl Wallenda (1905–1978), German-born tightrope artist
- Karl Weierstrass (1815–1897), German mathematician
- Karl Wendlinger (born 1968), Austrian race car driver
- Karl Williams (born 1971), American football player
- Karl Michael Ziehrer (1843–1922), Austrian composer

== Fictional characters ==
- Karl C. Agathon, a character in the re-imagined Battlestar Galactica series
- Karl Mayer, divorce attorney and ex-husband of Susan Mayer on Desperate Housewives
- Karl Morgenthau, the first Marvel Comics supervillain known as Flag-Smasher
- Karl Stromberg, the main antagonist in the 1977 James Bond film The Spy Who Loved Me
- Karl Heisenberg, a major antagonist in Capcom’s Resident Evil 8: Village

== See also ==
- Karl (disambiguation)
- Karl (surname)
- Karli (name)
- Karol (name)
- Karyl
