= Karla Gower =

American public relations professor

Karla K. Gower
- Born: 1957 (age 67–68)
- Employer: University of Alabama

Karla K. Gower (born 1957) is an American public relations professor, focusing in journalism and media and strategic communication, currently the Behringer Distinguished Professor in the Advertising and Public Relations at University of Alabama. Since 2008, she has been the director of The Plank Center for Leadership in Public Relations.

== Biography ==
Gower worked as an attorney in Canada for 8 years before moving to the United States. Her career includes work in public relations for Blue Cross and Blue Shield of Arizona, internal communications and media relations for GateWay Community College, and writing for the Office of University Development at the University of North Carolina, Chapel Hill.

She holds law and bachelor's degrees from the University of Western Ontario, Canada, a master's in mass communication from Arizona State University, and a doctorate in mass communication from the University of North Carolina at Chapel Hill.

== Works ==
- Liberty and Authority in Free Expression Law: The United States and Canada (2002)
- PR and the Press: The Troubled Embrace (2007)
- Gower, Karla K. (2018). Legal and ethical considerations for public relations (Third ed.). Long Grove, Illinois. ISBN 978-1-4786-3581-9. OCLC 1030317408.
- The Opinions of Mankind: Racial Issues, Press and Propaganda in the Cold War (2010) (co-author)
