= Karla González Cruz =

Mexican politician (born 1976)

- Born: 11 July 1976 (age 49); Cosoleacaque, Veracruz, Mexico
- Occupation: Politician
- Political party: PAN

Karla Verónica González Cruz (born 11 July 1976) is a Mexican politician from the National Action Party. From 2010 to 2012 she served as Deputy of the LXI Legislature of the Mexican Congress representing Veracruz.
