= Karla Cubias =

Background information
- Born: Karla Cubias; May 23, 1983 (age 42)
- Origin: Santa Ana, El Salvador
- Genres: R&B, Latin, Pop
- Occupation: Singer
- Instrument: Vocals

Karla Cubias (born May 23, 1983 in Santa Ana) is a Salvadoran singer. She is best known for being a semifinalist of the fourth season of the television program Latin American Idol.
