= Karla Satchell =

American microbiologist

- Born: Karla Fullner; July 31, 1966 (age 60); Anchorage, AK, U.S.
- Education: Pacific Lutheran University (BS); University of Washington (PhD)
- Awards: Investigator in Pathogenesis of Infectious Disease, Burroughs Wellcome Fund (2006); Driskill Graduate Program Dean's Outstanding Teacher Award, Northwestern Feinberg School of Medicine (2016)
- Scientific career
- Fields: Microbiology; Structural biology
- Workplaces: University of Pittsburgh; Harvard Medical School; Northwestern University, Feinberg School of Medicine

Karla Satchell (born Karla Fullner on July 31, 1966) is an American microbiologist who is currently the Anne Stewart Youman's Professor of Microbiology at Northwestern University Feinberg School of Medicine, an elected fellow of the American Association for the Advancement of Science, and a member of the American Academy of Microbiology.

== Education ==
Satchell earned her Ph.D at University of Washington in 1996 and conducted postdoctoral training with John Mekalanos at Harvard Medical School.

== Research ==
Satchell is known for studying microbiology, structural biology, cellular microbiology, bacteria and diseases and pathogenesis. She is most known for defining how the MARTX toxins of Vibrio cholerae and Vibrio vulnificus are modular proteins that deliver their constituent effectors to host cells to modify cell signaling to promote bacterial infection.

== Structural Biology ==
Satchell is head of the Center for Structural Biology of Infectious Diseases at Northwestern since 2017. The Center, established in 2007, provides an established consortium of laboratories in North America for rapid response research related to infectious disease outbreaks. The center determines 3-D structure of proteins from causing infectious such as bacteria, viruses and fungi to probe mechanisms of disease and inform strategies for effective diagnostics, vaccines and treatments.

== Publications ==
- Kerri-Lynn Sheahan, Christina L. Cordero, and Karla J. Fullner Satchell. Identification of a domain within the multifunctional Vibrio cholerae RTX toxin that covalently cross-links actin. PNAS. vol. 101 no. 26. 9798–9803
- KJF Satchell. MARTX, multifunctional autoprocessing repeats-in-toxin toxins. Infection and immunity. November 2007 vol. 75 no. 11 5079-5084.

== Awards and honors ==
- 2006 Investigator in Pathogenesis of Infectious Disease, Burroughs Wellcome Fund
- 2014 Elected a Fellow of the American Academy of Microbiology
- 2016 Driskill Graduate Program Dean's Outstanding Teacher Award, Northwestern Feinberg School of Medicine
- 2017 Elected a Fellow of the American Association for the Advancement of Science
