= List of storms named Karl =

The name Karl has been used for six tropical cyclones in the Atlantic Ocean:

- Hurricane Karl (1980) – moved across the central Atlantic; caused no significant effects on land
- Hurricane Karl (1998) – traveled from north of Bermuda to near the Azores; caused no significant effects on land
- Hurricane Karl (2004) – formed in the mid-Atlantic and turned north, reaching Category 4 strength in open water before hitting the Faroe Islands as an extratropical storm; caused no significant damage on land
- Hurricane Karl (2010) – formed in the Caribbean Sea on a path that took it over the Yucatán Peninsula and into the Gulf of Mexico, where it rapidly strengthened to Category 3 before making landfall near Veracruz, Mexico
- Tropical Storm Karl (2016) – long-lived but disorganized tropical storm, traveled from near Cape Verde to east of Bermuda; caused no significant effects on land
- Tropical Storm Karl (2022) – formed in the Bay of Campeche, moved north-northwestward before reversing course and following a south-southwestward path; caused significant flooding in Mexico

== See also ==
- Typhoon Carlo (1996) – a West Pacific Ocean tropical cyclone with a similar name
