= Kārlis Zilpaušs =

Latvian ice hockey player

- Born: 2 May 1918 Riga, Governorate of Livonia, Russian Empire
- Died: 27 December 1944 (aged 26) Soviet Union
- Position: Left wing
- Played for: ASK Riga; Riga City
- National team: Latvia
- Playing career: 1935–1943

Kārlis Zilpaušs (2 May 1918 – 27 December 1944) was a Latvian professional ice hockey left wing who played for the Latvian national ice hockey team. At the age of 17, he played in the Latvian Championship for ASK Riga, and he appeared in the 1938 and 1939 Ice Hockey World Championships.

== Personal life ==
Zilpaušs served in the Latvian Legion during the Second World War and was killed in the Soviet Union on 27 December 1944.

== Career statistics ==
=== Club career ===
			Regular season					Playoffs
Season	Team	League	GP	G	A	Pts	PIM	GP	G	A	Pts	PIM
1935–43	ASK Riga	LHL	–	–	–	–	–	–	–	–	–	–
1938–40	Riga City	LHL	3	0	–	–	–	–	–	–	–	–
Club career totals			3	0	–	–	–	–	–	–	–	–

=== International career ===
			Regular season					Playoffs
Season	Team	Competition	GP	G	A	Pts	PIM	GP	G	A	Pts	PIM
1937–39	Latvia	World Championships	10	2	1	3	3	–	–	–	–	–
1937–39	Latvia	International Matches	9	3	1	4	–	–	–	–	–	–
International career totals			19	5	2	7	3	–	–	–	–	–
