= Kahe =

Kahe may refer to:

== Places ==
- Kahe, Tanzania, a group of wards in northeastern Tanzania
  - Battle of Kahe, fought during the East African Campaign of World War I
- Kahe Mashariki, a town and ward in northeastern Tanzania
- Kahak, Razavi Khorasan, a village in Iran known as Kahe

== People ==
- Kahê (born 1982), nickname of Brazilian football player Carlos Eduardo de Souza Floresta
- Kahe Te Rau-o-te-rangi (died 1871), New Zealand te ati awa leader, trader and innkeeper

== Other ==
- Kahe language, of Tanzania
- KAHE, American radio station
- Kahe Gaye Pardes Piya, a 2009 Indian film
