= Ceorl =

Ceorl may refer to any of the following:

- Ceorl, a rider of Rohan in J.R.R. Tolkien's fictional world of Middle-earth
- Churl, a social rank in Anglo-Saxon England, the lowest class of "free" men
- King Cearl of Mercia, Anglo-Saxon ruler in the early 7th century
