= Karla, Ratnagiri =

Village in Maharashtra

Karla
- Village
- Location within Maharashtra Location within India
- Coordinates: 16°58′37″N 73°18′30″E
- Country: India
- State: Maharashtra
- District: Ratnagiri
- Taluka: Ratnagiri
- Time zone: UTC+05:30 (IST)
- Pincode: 415612

Karla is a village in Ratnagiri, Maharashtra, India.
