= Carlene (name) =

Carlene is a girl's given name, a variant of Charlene, that reached a peak of popularity in America in the 1950s. US birth records show over 12,000 birth names as Carlene from 1916 to 1972 with a peak of 371 birth names in 1955.

Several songs have been titled after the name – by the New Monkees (1987), then the best-known Carlene (Phil Vassar song), and a song by Westbound Train (2003).

== People with the given name Carlene ==
- Carlene Aguilar, Filipino actress and a former beauty queen
- Jazz (wrestler) (redirect from Carlene Begnaud) (1973) American professional wrestler
- Carlene Carter (1955), American country singer
- Carlene Davis (1953), Jamaican gospel and reggae singer
- Carlene LeFevre, competitive eater from Henderson, Nevada
- Carlene Mitchell, American coach
- Carlene Smith, Jamaica's first Dancehall Queen crowned in 1992
- Carlene M. Walker, American politician and businesswoman from Utah
- Carlene West (born c. 1945), Australian Indigenous artist

== See also ==
- Carlee
- Carlena
- Carlyne
- Karlene
