= Charles Godwyn =

Cleric, antiquarian, and book collector

Reverend Charles Godwyn (1701-1770) was a cleric, antiquarian, and book collector at the University of Oxford. Born in Thornbury, Gloucestershire, Godwyn was descended from Thomas Godwin, the bishop of Bath and Wells. Godwyn studied at Balliol College, Oxford starting in 1718. He earned his BA in 1721 and his MA in 1724. Godwyn followed several members of his family into a career in the church and was ordained in 1727.

Godwin remained affiliated with Balliol as a tutor, during which time he also pursued interests in antiquarianism and numismatics. He had collected more than 3,000 coins by the time of his death on April 23, 1770.

Godwyn developed a reputation among contemporary scholars for his learning and attention to students. He corresponded with scholars like John Hutchinson and Richard Chandler, and is said to have contributed to their work. As a testament to his scholarly reputation, Godwyn was the subject of multiple poetic tributes after his death. One anonymous poem appeared in Lloyd’s Evening Post, which called Godwyn “renown’d [and] rever’d” and praised his strength as a scholar:

On thee, her early pride, fair Science smil'd,

Lur'd from the mazes of her dark retreat,

And led thee, wondering, through the boundless wild,

To those sweet bowers where Wisdom fix'd her seat.

Ten years later, John Walters, a scholar at Jesus College, Oxford and sub-librarian at the Bodleian Library wrote that Godwyn was “of strongest mind, yet gentlest heart, / Whose boundless genius rang’d the fields of art.”

== Library and collections ==
Godwyn made several large contributions to the University of Oxford at his death. In his will, Godwyn bequeathed his collection of “antient [sic] coins and… Medals [to] be Employed in making emprovements [sic] in those collections of coins and Medals which are in the Bodleian Library.” Many of these coins are on display at the Ashmolean Museum, Oxford. These include a Roman imperial coin, an ancient Greek coin from Syracuse, and a gold coin stamped with the profile of Alexander the Great.

Godwyn’s will also made provision for his vast collection of “books [to] be employed in making such an addition to the Bodleian Library as shall be thought proper according to the Judgement of the Keeper of the said Library.” The Bodleian Library received close to 1,600 books from Godwin’s library. Many of these books focus on civil and church history, but the Godwyn collection also contains copies of some of the eighteenth century’s most influential philosophical works, including

- Samuel Clarke: The Scripture Doctrine of the Trinity (Godw. 8° 751)
- Edmund Burke: A philosophical enquiry into the origin of our ideas of the sublime and beautiful (Godw. 8° 492)
- David Hume: An enquiry concerning the principles of morals (Godw. subt. 88)

Along with books, Godwyn bequeathed a large collection of theological and literary pamphlets. Since the eighteenth century, the Bodleian has increased the Godwyn pamphlet collection (G. Pamph.) to more than 2,900 volumes comprising roughly 38,000 pamphlets. 75 of these additional volumes deal mainly with Irish history and came from the library of the Shakespearean scholar Edmond Malone (G.Pamph. 327-402). Another 41 volumes added to the Godwyn collection in 1836 were once owned by Jonathan Boucher. These volumes (G. Pamph. 276-316) concern affairs in the American colonies and the American Revolution.

The Bodleian also holds some manuscripts related to Godwyn, though many appear in other collections. MSS. Godwyn Num. 1-4 includes “Godwyn's own catalogue of his Greek and Roman coins.”
