= Kaarlo Wirilander =

Finnish historian

Kaarlo Verner Wirilander (14 August 1908 in Mikkeli – 16 October 1988 in Mikkeli), was a Finnish historian. Wirilander was 1935–1958 an official at the Finnish war archives.

Wirilander's research on social history is considered as of high standard. He was a student of Gunnar Suolahti and published works on the officer corps and the estates in whole. Wirilander belonged to the editorial staff for the great economic and social work Suomen kulttuurihistoria, together with Eino Jutikkala and Heikki Waris.

Kaarlo Wirilander's publications is often consulted by genealogists.

== Bibliography ==
- Suomen upseeristo 1700-luvulla (1950)
- Savon historia, III (1960)
- Herrasväkeä (ISBN 951-9254-00-5)
