= Kalina Balabanova =

Bulgarian politician and engineer

Kalina Petrova Balabanova

Personal details
- Born: 10 February 1990 (age 36) Sofia, Bulgaria
- Profession: Politician

Kalina Petrova Balabanova (Bulgarian: Калина Петрова Балабанова), (born 10 February 1990) in Sofia, is a Bulgarian politician who is a member of the nationalist party Attack.

She is currently a deputy in the National Parliament and is also part of the youth wing of the party.

In addition to her political career, Balabanova has been educated as an engineer with a specialty in "computer systems and technologies". In 2014, she pursued a Master's at the Technical University of Sofia. Besides her native Bulgarian, she speaks English, German and Russian.
