= Carley (name) =

Carley is both a given name and a surname. Notable people with the name include:

== Given name ==
- Carley Garner (born 1977), American commodity market strategist, broker and author
- Carley Gracie, Brazilian-born male martial artist
- Carley Mijović (born 1994), Australian basketball player
- Carley Stenson (born 1982), English actress and singer

== Surname ==
- Christopher Carley (born 1978), American actor
- George H. Carley (1938–2020), American judge and lawyer
- James A. Carley (1869–1952), American lawyer and politician
- James Carley, Canadian historian
- Patrick J. Carley (1866–1936), American politician

== See also ==
- Carley (disambiguation)
- Carle, surnames
- Carle (given name)
- Carlee
- Carles (name)
- Carlye J. Hughes
- Curley
- Karley
