= Karla Villarreal Benassini =

Mexican politician

- Born: 20 February 1975 (age 51); Mexico City, Mexico
- Occupation: Politician
- Political party: PANAL

Karla Daniella Villarreal Benassini (born 20 February 1975) is a Mexican politician from the New Alliance Party. From 2009 to 2012 she served as Deputy of the LXI Legislature of the Mexican Congress representing the Federal District.
