= Churl =

Non-servile peasant

A churl (Old High German karal), in its earliest Old English (Anglo-Saxon) meaning, was simply "a man" or more particularly a "free man", but the word soon came to mean "a non-servile peasant", still spelled ċeorl(e), and denoting the lowest rank of freemen. According to the Oxford English Dictionary, it later came to mean the opposite of nobility and royalty, "a common person". Says Chadwick:

we find that the distinction between thegn and ceorl is from the time of Aethelstan the broad line of demarcation between the classes of society.

This meaning held through the 15th century, but by then the word had taken on negative overtones, meaning "a country person" and then "a low fellow". By the 19th century, a new and pejorative meaning arose, "one inclined to uncivil or loutish behaviour"—hence "churlish" (cf. the pejorative sense of the term boor, whose original meaning of "country person" or "farmer" is preserved in Dutch and Afrikaans boer and German Bauer, although the latter has its own pejorative connotations such as those, prompting its use as the name for the chess piece known in English as a pawn; also the word villain—derived from Anglo-French and Old French, originally meaning "farmhand"—has gone through a similar process to reach its present meaning).

The ċeorles of early medieval England lived in a largely free society, and one in which their fealty was principally to their king. Their low status is shown by their werġild ("man-price"), which, over a large part of England, was fixed at 200 shillings (one-sixth that of a theġn). Agriculture was largely community-based and communal in open-field systems. This freedom was eventually eroded by the increase in power of feudal lords and the manorial system. Some scholars argue, however, that anterior to the encroachment of the manorial system the ċeorles owed various services and rents to local lords and powers.

In the North Germanic (Scandinavian) languages, the word Karl has the same root as churl and meant originally a "free man". As "housecarl", it came back to England. In German, Kerl is used to describe a somewhat rough and common man and is no longer in use as a synonym for a common soldier (die langen Kerls of King Frederick William I of Prussia). Rígsþula, a poem in the Poetic Edda, explains the social classes as originating from the three sons of Ríg: Thrall, Karl and Earl (Þræl, Karl and Jarl). This story has been interpreted in the context of the proposed trifunctional hypothesis of Proto-Indo-European society.

Cognates to the word ceorle are frequently found in place names, throughout the Anglophone world, in towns such as Carlton and Charlton, meaning "the farmstead of the churls". Names such as Carl and Charles are derived from cognates of churl or ċeorle.

While the word churl went down in the social scale, the first name derived from the same etymological source ("Karl" in German, "Charles" in French and English, "Carlos" in Spanish, Karel in Dutch, etc.) remained prestigious enough to be used frequently by many European royal families—owing originally to the fame of Charlemagne, to which was added that of later illustrious kings and emperors of the same name. The Polish word for "king", Król, is also derived from the same origin.

In her tragedy Ethwald (Part II), Joanna Baillie uses the spelling cairl, and in act 2, scene II, the characters, First Cairl, Second Cairl and Third Cairl are found searching amongst the dead upon a battle field. This play is set in Mercia.

== Current use ==
In most Germanic languages this word never took on the English meaning of "lowly peasant" and retains its original meaning of "fellow, guy"; cf. West Frisian: keardel, archaic tsjerl, tsjirl, Dutch: kerel, Low German: Kerl (also borrowed into German), Swedish: karl, Faroese: kallur and so on.

== See also ==
- Carlin stone
- Ceorl (disambiguation)
