= Karley =

Karley is a feminine given name. Notable people known by this name include the following:

== Given name ==
- Karley Sciortino American writer, television host, and producer

== Fictional character ==
- Karley, Brittany Snow character in 96 Minutes

== See also ==
- Carley (name)
- Kaley Cuoco
- Karle (name)
- Karly
