= John L. Karle =

American lawyer and politician

John Lawrence Karle (April 14, 1894 in Queens – 1953) was an American lawyer and politician from New York.

== Life ==
He graduated from Fordham Law School, was admitted to the bar in 1916, and practiced law in New York City.

Karle was a member of the New York State Senate (2nd D.) between 1920 and 1922, sitting in the 143rd, 144th and 145th New York State Legislatures.

He was again a member of the State Senate in 1925 and 1926. In November 1925, he ran on the Republican ticket for Borough President of Queens, but was defeated by the Democrat Maurice E. Connolly.

In March 1929, Karle was appointed by Borough President George U. Harvey as Commissioner of Sewers and Borough Secretary. In September 1929, Karle ran as the regular nominee at the Republican primary election for Queens Borough President, but was defeated by the incumbent Harvey who ran as a challenger.

== Sources ==
- New York Red Book (1925, pg. 67)
- HARVEY RECOGNIZES KARLE AS LEADER in NYT on March 30, 1929 (subscription required)
- KARLE DFSIGNATED TO OPPOSE HARVEY in NYT on August 27, 1929 (subscription required)
- HARVEY VICTORIOUS BY 24,425 MAJORITY in NYT on September 19, 1929 (subscription required)

New York State Senate
Preceded by Frank F. Adel	New York State Senate; 2nd District; 1920–1922	Succeeded by Frank Giorgio
Preceded by Frank Giorgio	New York State Senate; 2nd District; 1925–1926	Succeeded by Stephen F. Burkard
