= Karle Wilson Baker =

American poet & author (1878–1960)

- Born: October 13, 1878; Little Rock, Arkansas
- Died: November 8, 1960 (aged 82); Nacogdoches, Texas
- Occupations: Teacher; poet; writer
- Writing career
- Pen name: Charlotte Wilson
- Period: 20th century

Karle Wilson Baker (née Wilson; 1878–1960) was an American poet and author, born in Little Rock, Ark. to Kate Florence Montgomery Wilson and William Thomas Murphey Wilson. Educated at the University of Chicago, she studied under poet William Vaughn Moody and novelist Robert Herrick, and later went on to write her own poems and novels.

== Early publications ==
Under the pseudonym of "Charlotte Wilson," she was co-author of Women and Prisons (1912), published in London by the Fabian Society. She contributed fiction and poetry to Harper's, Atlantic Monthly, Yale Review, The Century, etc., and was the author of Blue Smoke, a collection of poetry (1919), The Garden of the Plynck (1920), The Burning Bush (1922), and Old Coins (1923).

== Early life in Nacogdoches, Texas ==
In 1893, Baker decided to add a final "e" to the end of her first name in order to better avoid the gender confusions with her name. Yet, despite this change, her name continued to be mistaken as a man's by fans and reviewers of her writings. In 1900, Baker first visited Nacogdoches, Texas to see her parents. Later, in 1906, she permanently moved from Little Rock, Arkansas, where she had been teaching school, to Nacogdoches. There, she fell in love with the beauty of the surrounding nature, which she would later describe in her book, The Birds of Tanglewood. At Nacogdoches, she also met her future husband, Thomas Ellis Baker, and the two married in 1907. Together they had two children: Thomas Wilson Baker (born 1908), who later became a banker, and Charlotte Baker Montgomery (1910), who later wrote and illustrated many of her own children's books, as well as two adult novels.

== Continuing career ==
From 1924 to 1934, she became a teacher in Nacogdoches, teaching contemporary poetry at Stephen F. Austin State University (SFA). In fact, when her poem titled "The Pine Tree Hymn" was written, it also became adopted as the school song for SFA. During this time, she was also able to publish two children's readers, Texas Flag Primer (1926) and Two Little Texans (1932), one of which became a state textbook for school children from 1926 to 1929. In addition to her teaching career, she also published three more books: The Birds of Tanglewood describing the birds within Nacogdoches, Dreamers on Horseback (her last book of collected poems), Family Style (1937) a novel recounting the occurrence of the East Texan oil boom, and Star of the Wilderness (1942), which became a Book-of-the-Month Club selection.

== Accomplishments ==
In addition to teaching at Stephen F. Austin University (1924–1934), she also gave lectures at various colleges, women's clubs, and literary groups in Texas. Later on in her life, she also attended University of Chicago, Columbia University, and University of California at Berkeley. Soon known as one of Texas' most talented writers, Baker received the most recognition and honors of any female poet in Texas during the 20th century. As a charter member of the Institute of Letters, the Poetry Society of Texas, and the Philosophical Society of Texas, she was also the first female and third person to be named a Fellow of the Texas Institute of Letters. Her accomplishments included having had her first four books published by the Yale University Press, being awarded with an honorary Doctorate of Letters by the Southern Methodist University in 1924, and being nominated for the Pulitzer Prize for Poetry for her last collection of poetry Dreamers on Horseback in 1931. She was 82 years old when she died on November 8, 1960.

== Poems ==
- "At the Picture-Show"
- "Apple and Rose"
- "A Clear Night"
- "Courage" *
- "Days"
- "Good Company"
- "I Shall Be Loved As Quiet Things"
- "Let Me Grow Lovely
- "Nacogdoches Speaks"
- "Within the Alamo"

== Texas Woman of Letters, Karle Wilson Baker ==
Written by author Sarah Ragland Jackson, this biography describes Karle Wilson Baker's life as a Texan poet of the 20th century, but whose important contributions to Texas literature have been overshadowed by her male contemporaries. Published in December 2005, this book provides thorough well-researched details on Baker's life and gives readers more of an insight to Karle Wilson Baker's challenge in making her way into the mainly male-dominated literary world of that time.
