= Charles Zadok =

American businessman, art collector and patron

Charles Zadok (August 11, 1896 – April 7, 1984) was an American businessman, art collector and patron.

== Early life ==
Zadok was born on August 11, 1896 in Thessaloniki, Ottoman Empire.

In 1922, Zadok, who was Portuguese and 25 years old, arrived in Ellis Island, after having lived in Paris, France, where he was a merchant, and the son of Mr Zadok of 38 N. D. de Lorette, Paris.

== Career ==
Zadok joined Gimbels in 1929, and was vice president of expansion from 1956 until his retirement in the 1970s.

== Art collector ==
His art collection included work by André Derain, Joan Miró, Pierre Bonnard, Fernand Léger, Rufino Tamayo, Raoul Dufy, Wassily Kandinsky, Marc Chagall, Robert Delaunay, Pablo Picasso, Marcel Gromaire, Gérard Schneider, Jean Bazaine, Massimo Campigli, Ottone Rosai, Giorgio Morandi, and Mario Sironi.

In 1956, there was an exhibition, The collection of Mr. and Mrs. Charles Zadok at the Milwaukee Art Museum, and a book was published of the works shown.

== Personal life ==
He was married to Eugenia Balkin "Genia" Zadok (1900–1988), who was born in Vilno, Poland.

In 1935, they were living in New York City, but by 1940, had moved to Shorewood Village, Milwaukee, Wisconsin.

Zadok died at his home in Manhattan on April 7, 1984, aged 87.
