= Carle (disambiguation) =

Carle may refer to:

- Carle, a surname
- Carle (given name)

== See also ==
- Carl (disambiguation)
