= Kārlis Zariņš (writer) =

Latvian writer

- Born: December 9, 1889; Libau, Courland Governorate, Russian Empire
- Died: December 20, 1978 (aged 89); Sabile, Latvian SSR, Soviet Union
- Occupation: Writer
- Writing career
- Language: Latvian
- Period: 1911 – 1945
- Genres: Novel, short story

Kārlis Zariņš (December 12, 1889 – December 20, 1978) was a Latvian writer. Zariņš' works are characterised by a focus on the strangeness of life, on the strange characters of people; sometimes mysticism is also found in them.
