= Carolus (coin) =

Carolus is the name given to a number of gold coins:

- a coin struck during the reign of Charles I of England. It was originally valued at 20 shillings, but later 23.
- the Carolusgulden first minted by Charles V (Holy Roman Empire) in 1517, see Dutch Guilder#History
- the Carolus dollar, a Spanish-American peso or piece of eight issued by Charles III (1759-88) and Charles IV (1788-1808) of Spain.
