= Karolin (name) =

Karolin is a Danish, Finnish, German, Norwegian, and Swedish feminine given name that is a diminutive form of Carolina and Caroline as well as an alternate form of Carolin. Karólín is an Icelandic feminine given name that is a diminutive form of Carola as well as a short form of Karolína. Notable people referred to by this name include the following:

== Given name ==
- Karolin Braunsberger-Reinhold (born 1986), German politician
- Karolin Horchler (born 1989), German biathlete
- Karolin Lampert (born 1995), German professional golfer
- Karolin Luger, Austrian biochemist and biophysicist
- Karolin Margret Natasa (born 1982), Indonesian politician
- Karolin Ohlsson (born 1991), Swedish orienteering competitor
- Karolin Thomas (born 1985), German football player
- Karolin Wagner (born 1996), German slalom canoeist
- Karolin Wolter (born 1991), German fashion model

== Middle name ==
- Sascha Karolin Aulepp (born 1970), German politician

== See also ==
- Karolin (disambiguation)
- Karlin (surname)
- Karoli
- Karolien
- Karolín
- Karolina
- Karoline
- Karolyn
