= Karoline =

Karoline is a given name. Notable people with the name include:

- Karoline Amaral (born 1984), Brazilian model
- Karoline Bjørnson (1835–1934), Norwegian actress
- Karoline Bruch-Sinn (1853–1911), Austrian writer
- Karoline Dyhre Breivang (born 1980), Norwegian team handball player
- Karoline Hausted, Danish pianist and songwriter
- Karoline Herfurth (born 1984), German actress
- Karoline Jagemann (1777–1848), major German tragic actress and singer
- Karoline Käfer (1954–2023), retired sprinter from Austria
- Karoline Kaulla (1739–1809), one of the greatest Court Jews of her time
- Karoline Krüger, Norwegian singer-songwriter and pianist
- Karoline Leach (born 1967), British playwright and author
- Karoline Leavitt (born 1997), American political aide and government official
- Karoline Linnert (born 1958), German politician of the Alliance 90/The Greens
- Karoline Nemetz (born 1958), Swedish former distance runner
- Karoline Pichler (1769–1843), Austrian novelist
- Karoline Seidler-Wranitzky (1790–1872), Czech operatic soprano
- Karoline Stern (1800–1885), German operatic soprano
- Karoline von Günderrode (1780–1806), German poet, born in Karlsruhe
- Karoline von Manderscheid-Blankenheim (1768–1831), princess consort of Liechtenstein

== See also ==
- Archduchess Karoline Marie of Austria (1869–1945), member of the House of Habsburg-Lorraine
- Countess Karoline Ernestine of Erbach-Schönberg (born 1727), daughter of Georg August, Count of Erbach-Schönberg
- Landgravine Karoline Amalie of Hesse-Kassel (1771–1848), German princess member of the House of Hesse-Kassel
- Marie Karoline von Fuchs-Mollard (1681–1754), governess of Maria Theresa of Austria
- Princess Karoline Mathilde of Schleswig-Holstein-Sonderburg-Augustenburg (1860–1932), the second-eldest daughter of Frederick VIII
- Princess Karoline Mathilde of Schleswig-Holstein-Sonderburg-Glücksburg (1894–1972), member of the House of Schleswig-Holstein-Sonderburg-Glücksburg
- Tove Karoline Knutsen (born 1951), Norwegian politician for the Labour Party
- Caroline (given name)
- Karolina (given name)
- Karline
- Karolien
- Karolin (name)
