= Niedziałka =

Niedziałka may refer to the following places in Poland:

- Niedziałka Druga
- Stara Niedziałka
