= Karolien =

Karolien is a Dutch, and Swedish feminine given name that is a diminutive form of Carolina and Caroline as well as an alternate form of Carolin. Notable people referred to by this name include the following:

== Given name ==
- Karolien Florijn (born 1998), Dutch rower
- Karolien Grosemans (born 1970), Belgian politician

== See also ==
- Karolin (name)
- Karoline (disambiguation)
