= Karilyn =

Karilyn is a given name that is a variation of Caroline. Notable people known by this name include the following:

- Karilyn Bonilla Colón, Puerto Rican politician
- Karilyn Brown (born 1947), American politician
- Karilyn Pilch (born 1986), American ice hockey executive

== See also ==
- Karalyn Patterson
- Kari Lynn Dell
- Karilynn Ming Ho
- Kari-Lynn Winters
- Karlyn
- Karolyn
