= Karolin =

Karolin may refer to:

== Places ==
- Karolín, a municipality and village in the Zlín Region in the Czech Republic
- Karolin, a neighbourhood in Warsaw, Poland
  - Karolin, a metro station in the neighbourhood, currently under construction
- Karolin, Greater Poland Voivodeship (west-central Poland)
- Karolin, Kuyavian-Pomeranian Voivodeship (north-central Poland)
- Karolin, Gmina Garbów in Lublin Voivodeship (east Poland)
- Karolin, Gmina Zakrzew in Lublin Voivodeship (east Poland)
- Karolin, Łęczna County in Lublin Voivodeship (east Poland)
- Karolin, Białobrzegi County in Masovian Voivodeship (east-central Poland)
- Karolin, Zwoleń County in Masovian Voivodeship (east-central Poland)
- Karolin, Podlaskie Voivodeship (north-east Poland)
- Karolin, Pomeranian Voivodeship (north Poland)
- Karolin, an island in the novel The Garden of God

== People ==
- Karolin (name)

== See also ==
- Karolina (disambiguation)
