= North Carolina (disambiguation) =

North Carolina is a state in the Southeastern region of the United States.

North Carolina may also refer to:

== Places ==
- Province of North Carolina, a British colony from 1712 to 1776

== Educational institutions ==
- University of North Carolina, the public university system of the state of North Carolina, of which the Chapel Hill campus is the oldest
- University of North Carolina at Chapel Hill, often referred to (technically inaccurately) as the "University of North Carolina"

== Ships ==
- CSS North Carolina, an ironclad gunboat built by the Confederate States Navy in 1863
- USS North Carolina, the name of five ships of the United States Navy
- In the Antebellum period, the North Carolina was the lead ship of slave trader Zephaniah Kingsley.

== Sport ==
- North Carolina Tar Heels, the athletic program of the University of North Carolina at Chapel Hill

== See also ==
- Carolina (disambiguation)
