= Karolina =

Karolina may refer to:

== People ==
- Karolina (given name), a feminine given name (includes a list of people with the name)
- Karolina (singer), singer/songwriter from Eilat, Israel

== Places ==
- Karolina, Łódź Voivodeship (central Poland)
- Karolina, Grodzisk County in Masovian Voivodeship (east-central Poland)
- Karolina, Mińsk County in Masovian Voivodeship (east-central Poland)
- Karolina, Piaseczno County in Masovian Voivodeship (east-central Poland)

== Other uses ==
- HSC Karolina (built 1989), a high speed craft owned and operated by the Croatian shipping company Jadrolinija
- Karolina (confectionery company), a Croatian company based in Osijek, previously known as Sloboda, now part of Kraš

== See also ==
- Carolina (disambiguation)
- Caroline (disambiguation)
- Karlina
- Karolin (disambiguation)
- Karolina-Kolonia, a Polish village
