= Carolina (name) =

- Pronunciation: English: /ˌkærəˈlaɪnə/ KARR-ə-LY-nə; Czech: [ˈkaroliːna] Dutch: [kaːroːˈlinaː] Italian: [karoˈliːna] European Portuguese: [kɐɾuˈlinɐ] Brazilian Portuguese: [kaɾoˈlinɐ] Spanish: [kaɾoˈlina]
- Gender: Female
- Language: Spanish, English, Dutch, Italian, Portuguese, Catalan and Swedish

Other gender
- Masculine: Carolus

Origin
- Languages: Latin, from Germanic
- Meaning: 'freeholder', 'song of joy', 'strong', ‘beautiful’

Other names
- Related names: Caroline, Carolyn

Carolina is a feminine given name in Italian, English, Dutch, Spanish, Portuguese, Catalan, Swedish, derived from the masculine name Carolus which is Latin for Charles, generally meaning 'free man' or 'freeholder'.

== Variations ==
- Karolina (Indonesian, Polish, Slovenian, Hungarian, Swedish, Norwegian, Danish, German)
- Karolína (Czech, Slovak)
- Каролина (Bulgarian)
- Carolina (Italian, English, Indonesian Spanish, Portuguese)
- Karna (Swedish)
- Καρολίνα (Greek)

== List of notable people with the given name Carolina ==
- Carolina Albuquerque (born 1984), Portuguese marketeer and data scientist
- Carolina Amesty (born 1994), American politician
- Carolina Barco (born 1951), Colombian-American diplomat
- Carolina Benedetti, Colombian mathematician and educator
- Carolina Contreras, Dominican businesswoman
- Carolina del Castillo Díaz (1867–1933), Spanish painter
- Carolina Dieckmann (born 1978), Brazilian actress
- Carolina Duer (born 1978), Argentine world champion boxer
- Carolina Falkholt, Swedish artist, graffiti writer, and musician
- Carolina Freyre (1844–1916), Peruvian poet, playwright, and novelist
- Carolina Gaitán, Colombian television actress
- Carolina Gómez (born 1974), Colombian actress, presenter, and model
- Carolina Gómez (cyclist) (born 1992), Argentine cyclist
- Carolina Gynning, Swedish model
- Carolina Granberg (1818–1884), Swedish ballerina
- Carolina Hiller (born 1997), Canadian speed skater
- Carolina Maria de Jesus (1914–1977), Brazilian writer
- Carolina Herrera (born 1939), Venezuelan fashion designer
- Carolina Huidobro (c. 1859–1909), Chilean teacher and suffragist
- Carolina Klüft, Swedish athlete
- Carolina Kostner, Italian figure skater
- Carolina Loff (1911–1999), Cape Verdean and Portuguese communist
- Carolina Luzzatto (1837–1919), Italian journalist and writer
- Carolina Marín, professional badminton player from Spain
- Carolina Moraes (born 1980), Brazilian synchronized swimmer
- Carolina A. Miranda, columnist for the Los Angeles Times
- Carolina Miranda (actress) (born 1989), Mexican television actress
- Carolina Miranda (footballer) (born 1982), Spanish football midfielder
- Carolina Oliphant, Lady Nairne, a Scottish songwriter
- Carolina Östberg, Swedish opera singer
- Karolina Pelendritou (born 1986), Greek-Cypriot visually impaired swimmer
- Carolina Ravassa (born 1985), Colombian actress
- Carolina Darias San Sebastián, Spanish politician
- Carolina Santo Domingo, American fashion designer
- Carolina Spreti (born 1999), know professionally as Caro Wow, Italian singer-songwriter
- Carolina Stutchbury (born 2005), American fencer
- Carolina Telechea (born 1981), Catalan politician
- Carolina Marcelino (born 1984), Brazilian female researcher and computer scientist

== See also ==
- Carolina (disambiguation)
- Carlina (name)
- Carolena Carstens
- Karolina (given name)
