= Carolina =

Carolina may refer to:

== Places ==
=== United States ===
- The Carolinas, the U.S. states of North and South Carolina
  - North Carolina, a U.S. state
  - South Carolina, a U.S. state
- Province of Carolina, a British province until 1712
- Carolina, Alabama, a town in the United States
- Carolina, North Carolina (disambiguation), multiple places
- Carolina, Puerto Rico, a city and municipality in the United States
- Carolina, Rhode Island, a village and historic district in the United States
- Carolina, West Virginia, a town in the United States
- Carolina, U.S. Virgin Islands, a neighborhood in the U.S. Virgin Islands
- The Carolina terrane, a geologic terrane in the southeastern United States

=== Other places ===
- Carolina, Maranhão, a municipality in Brazil
- Carolina, Mpumalanga, an urban-rural area in South Africa
- Carolina, San Luis, a village and municipality Argentina
- Carolina, San Miguel, a municipality in El Salvador
- Carolina, Santa Maria, a bairro in Brazil
- Carolina, Suriname, a resort in Suriname

== Music ==
- "Carolina" (Taylor Swift song) (2022)
- Carolina (Eric Church album) (2009)
- Carolina (Seu Jorge album) or Samba Esporte Fino, also a track on the album (2001)
- "Carolina" (state song), the state song of South Carolina
- "Carolina" (Parmalee song) (2013)
- "Caroline", a song from the album III by Espers
- "Carolina", a song from the album Everything In Between by Matt Wertz
- "Carolina", a song from the album The Golden Echo by Kimbra
- "Carolina", a song from the self-titled debut album by Harry Styles

== Sports ==
- Carolina Cougars (1969–1974) of the American Basketball Association
- Carolina Dynamo of United Soccer Leagues Premier Development League
- Carolina Hurricanes of the National Hockey League
- Carolina League, a Class-A league within Minor League Baseball
- Carolina Marín, Spanish Badminton Player
- Carolina Mudcats (1991–2011), a baseball team of the Double-A Southern League
- Carolina Panthers of the National Football League
- Carolina RailHawks FC of the United Soccer League First Division
- Carolina Rollergirls of the Women's Flat Track Derby Association (WFTDA)
- Carolina Sandsharks, a professional indoor football team of the AIFA

== Food ==
- Carolina (pastry), a typical pastry of Bilbao, Spain
- Carolina (rice), a brand of rice sold by Riviana Foods, a subsidiary of Ebro Foods
- Carolina (Brazilian pastry), a Brazilian dessert similar to an éclair
- Carolina (Brazilian sweet), a Brazilian dessert traditional to the Northeast

== Other uses ==
- Carolina (name), a feminine given name and list of people with the name
- Carolina (2003 film), a film featuring Julia Stiles
- Carolina (1961 film), a Yugoslavian-French film
- Carolina (1934 film), a film by Henry King
- Carolina (ship), a Civil War merchant ship
- Two American universities and their sports teams known colloquially as Carolina:
  - University of North Carolina at Chapel Hill
    - North Carolina Tar Heels
  - University of South Carolina
    - South Carolina Gamecocks
- Constitutio Criminalis Carolina
- 235 Carolina, an asteroid

== See also ==
- Caroline (disambiguation)
- Carolinian (disambiguation)
- "Carolyna", a song by Melanie C from This Time
- Karolina (disambiguation)
