= Karolyn =

Karolyn is an English, and Swedish feminine given name that is a diminutive form of Carolina and Caroline as well as an alternate form of Karolin. Notable people referred to by this name include the following:

== Given name ==
- Karolyn Ali (1944 – 2015), American film and music video producer
- Karolyn Grimes (born 1940), American actress
- Karolyn Kirby (born 1961), American beach volleyball player
- Karolyn Nelke (born 1948), American actor, playwright and author
- Karolyn Smardz Frost, Canadian historian

== See also ==
- Carolyn
- Karalyn Patterson
- Karilyn
- Karlyn
- Karolin (name)
- Károly
- Károlyné Honfi
