= Królewiec, Masovian Voivodeship =

Królewiec
- Village
- Location within Poland
- Coordinates: 52°12′18″N 21°32′40″E
- Country: Poland
- Voivodeship: Masovian
- County: Mińsk
- Gmina: Mińsk Mazowiecki
- Population: 680

Królewiec (Polish pronunciation: [kruˈlɛvjɛts]) is a village in the administrative district of Gmina Mińsk Mazowiecki, within Mińsk County, Masovian Voivodeship, in east-central Poland.
