= Tougher in Texas =

Tougher in Texas is a contemporary romance novel written by Kari Lynn Dell.

The novel is the third entry in Dell's Texas Rodeo series. Like its predecessors, the novel is a Western romance featuring characters who are very involved in rodeo. The male protagonist, Cole Jacobs, is a rodeo producer who has Asperger's. The female protagonist, Shawnee Jacobs, is hired to work his rodeos as a pickup man (a rider on horseback who helps protect the rodeo competitors). Dell's son was diagnosed with Asperger's in kindergarten, and she envisioned her hero as an adult version of him who was not diagnosed until adulthood.

Publishers Weekly lauded Dell's character development, finding the hero to be "a most appealing and believable protagonist". BookPage agreed that the characters were well-developed, and noted that "the rodeo setting rings with authenticity and vibrant color".

Tougher in Texas was a finalist for a 2018 Romance Writers of America RITA Award for Best Long Contemporary.
