= Huta Mińska =

- Village
- Location within Poland
- Coordinates: 52°9′16″N 21°34′2″E
- Country: Poland
- Voivodeship: Masovian
- County: Mińsk
- Gmina: Mińsk Mazowiecki
- Population: 583

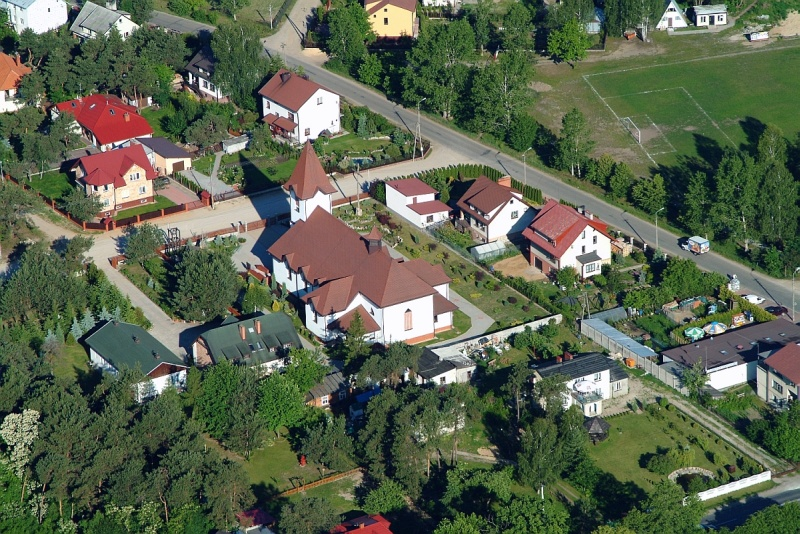
Church

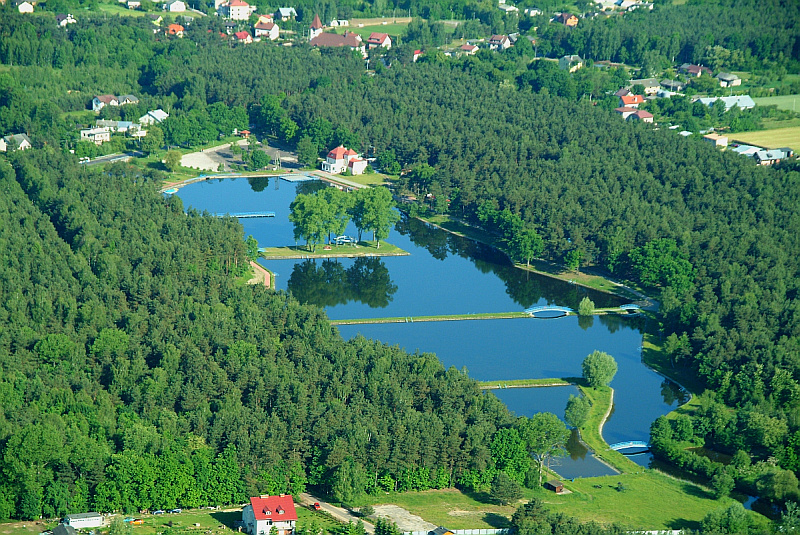

Huta Mińska [ˈxuta ˈmiɲska] is a village in the administrative district of Gmina Mińsk Mazowiecki, within Mińsk County, Masovian Voivodeship, in east-central Poland.
