= Karyn =

Karyn is an English-language given name and may refer to:

== People with the name ==
- Karyn Bailey (born 1986), Australian netball player
- Karyn Bosnak (born 1974), American author
- Karyn Bryant (born 1968), American actress, writer and television personality
- Karyn Bye-Dietz (born 1971), American ice hockey player
- Karyn Calabrese (born 1947), American raw foodist and restaurateur
- Karyn Dwyer (1975–2018), Canadian actress
- Karyn Faure (born 1969), French swimmer
- Karyn Forbes (born 1991), Tobagonian soccer player
- Karyn Garossino (born 1965), Canadian ice dancer
- Karyn Gojnich (born 1960), Australian sailor
- Karyn Hay (born 1959), New Zealand author and broadcaster
- Karyn Khoury, American perfumer
- Karyn Kupcinet (1941–1963), American actress
- Karyn Kusama (born 1968), American film and television director
- Karyn Marshall (born 1956), American weightlifter
- Karyn McCluskey, Scottish forensic psychologist
- Karyn Moffat, Canadian computer scientist
- Karyn Monk (born 1960), Canadian writer
- Karyn Olivier (born 1968), American artist and sculptor
- Karyn Palgut (born 1962), American handballer
- Karyn Paluzzano (born 1960), Australian politician
- Karyn Parsons (born 1966), American actress, author and comedian
- Karyn Polito (born 1966), American attorney and politician
- Karyn Pugliese, Canadian broadcast journalist and communications specialist
- Karyn Rachtman, American music supervisor
- Karyn Rochelle, American country singer and songwriter
- Karyn Spencer, American talent agent
- Karyn Temple, American attorney
- Karyn Turner (born 1946), American martial arts expert
- Karyn Usher, American television producer and writer
- Karyn Velez (1990–2013), Filipino–American badminton player
- Karyn Walsh, Australian social justice advocate
- Karyn White (born 1965), American singer
- Karyn Williams (born 1979), American Christian musician

== See also ==
- Save Karyn, the name of both a Web site and a book
- Murder of Karyn Hearn Slover, September 27, 1996 in Decatur, Illinois
- Karen (disambiguation)
- Karlyn
- Kary (disambiguation)
- Karyun
- Kathryn
