= Marianka, Gmina Mińsk Mazowiecki =

Marianka
- Village
- Location within Poland
- Coordinates: 52°09′05″N 21°34′57″E
- Country: Poland
- Voivodeship: Masovian
- County: Mińsk
- Gmina: Mińsk Mazowiecki
- Population: 526

Marianka [maˈrjaŋka] is a village in the administrative district of Gmina Mińsk Mazowiecki, within Mińsk County, Masovian Voivodeship, in east-central Poland.
