= Zamienie, Mińsk County =

Zamienie
- Village
- Location within Poland
- Coordinates: 52°9′N 21°30′E
- Country: Poland
- Voivodeship: Masovian
- County: Mińsk
- Gmina: Mińsk Mazowiecki
- Population: 708

Zamienie [zaˈmjɛɲɛ] is a village in Gmina Mińsk Mazowiecki, Mińsk County, Masovian Voivodeship, Poland.
