= Zakole-Wiktorowo =

- Village
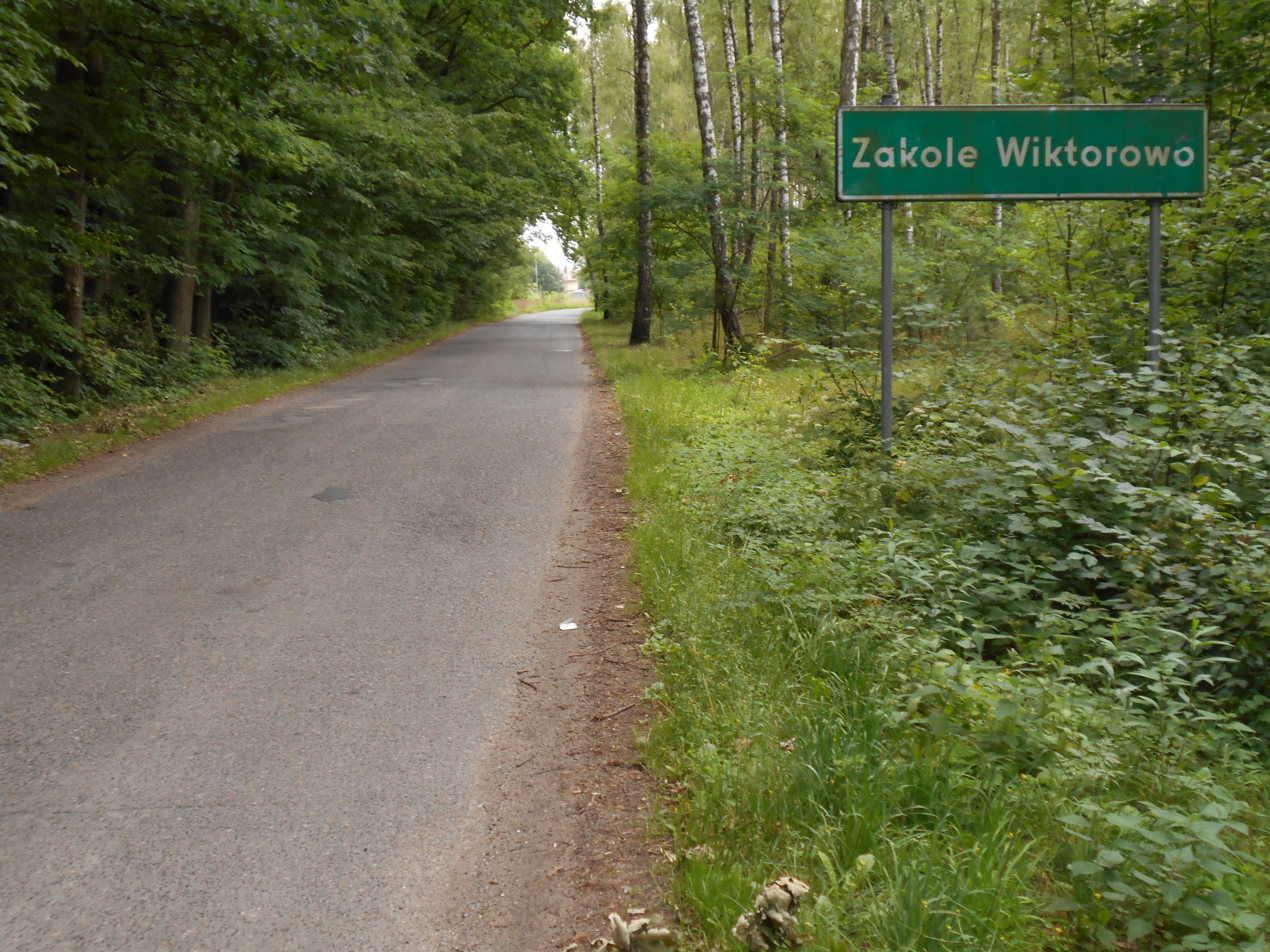

- Location within Poland
- Coordinates: 52°09′22″N 21°36′58″E
- Country: Poland
- Voivodeship: Masovian
- County: Mińsk
- Gmina: Mińsk Mazowiecki

Population
  - Total: 200

Zakole-Wiktorowo [zaˈkɔlɛ viktɔˈrɔvɔ] is a village in the administrative district of Gmina Mińsk Mazowiecki, within Mińsk County, Masovian Voivodeship, in east-central Poland.
