= Carolina, North Carolina =

Carolina, North Carolina may refer to:

- Carolina, Alamance County, North Carolina
- Carolina, Gaston County, North Carolina

== See also ==
- Carolina (disambiguation)
