= Barcząca =

- Village
- Location within Poland
- Coordinates: 52°10′N 21°38′E
- Country: Poland
- Voivodeship: Masovian
- County: Mińsk
- Gmina: Mińsk Mazowiecki
- Population: 522

Barcząca [barˈt͡ʂɔnt͡sa] is a village in the administrative district of Gmina Mińsk Mazowiecki, within Mińsk County, Masovian Voivodeship, in east-central Poland.
