= Wólka Mińska =

- Village
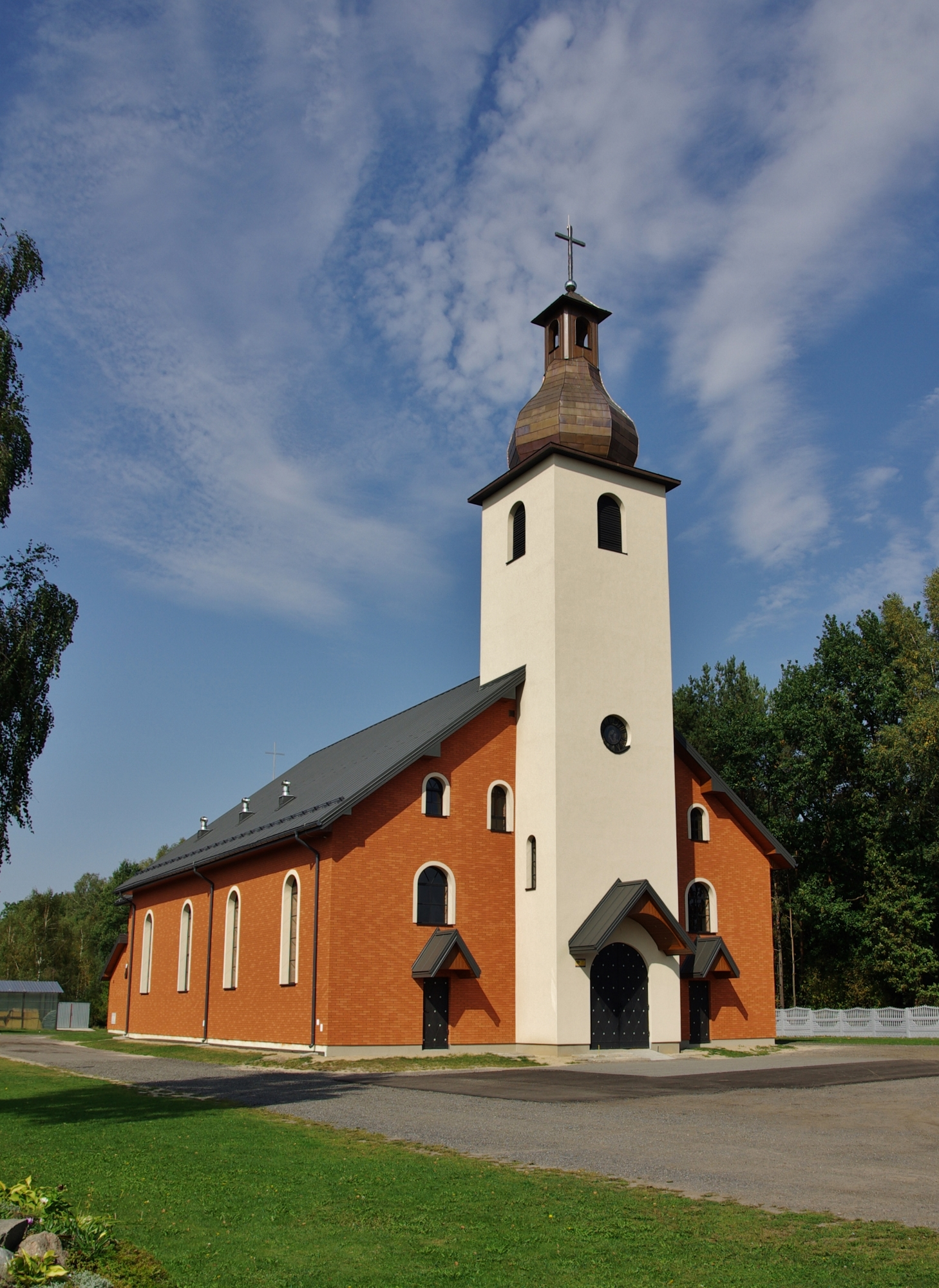

- Location within Poland
- Coordinates: 52°12′13″N 21°34′04″E
- Country: Poland
- Voivodeship: Masovian
- County: Mińsk
- Gmina: Mińsk Mazowiecki
- Population: 421

Wólka Mińska [ˈvulka ˈmiɲska] is a village in the administrative district of Gmina Mińsk Mazowiecki, within Mińsk County, Masovian Voivodeship, in east-central Poland.
