= Prusy, Mińsk County =

Prusy
- Village
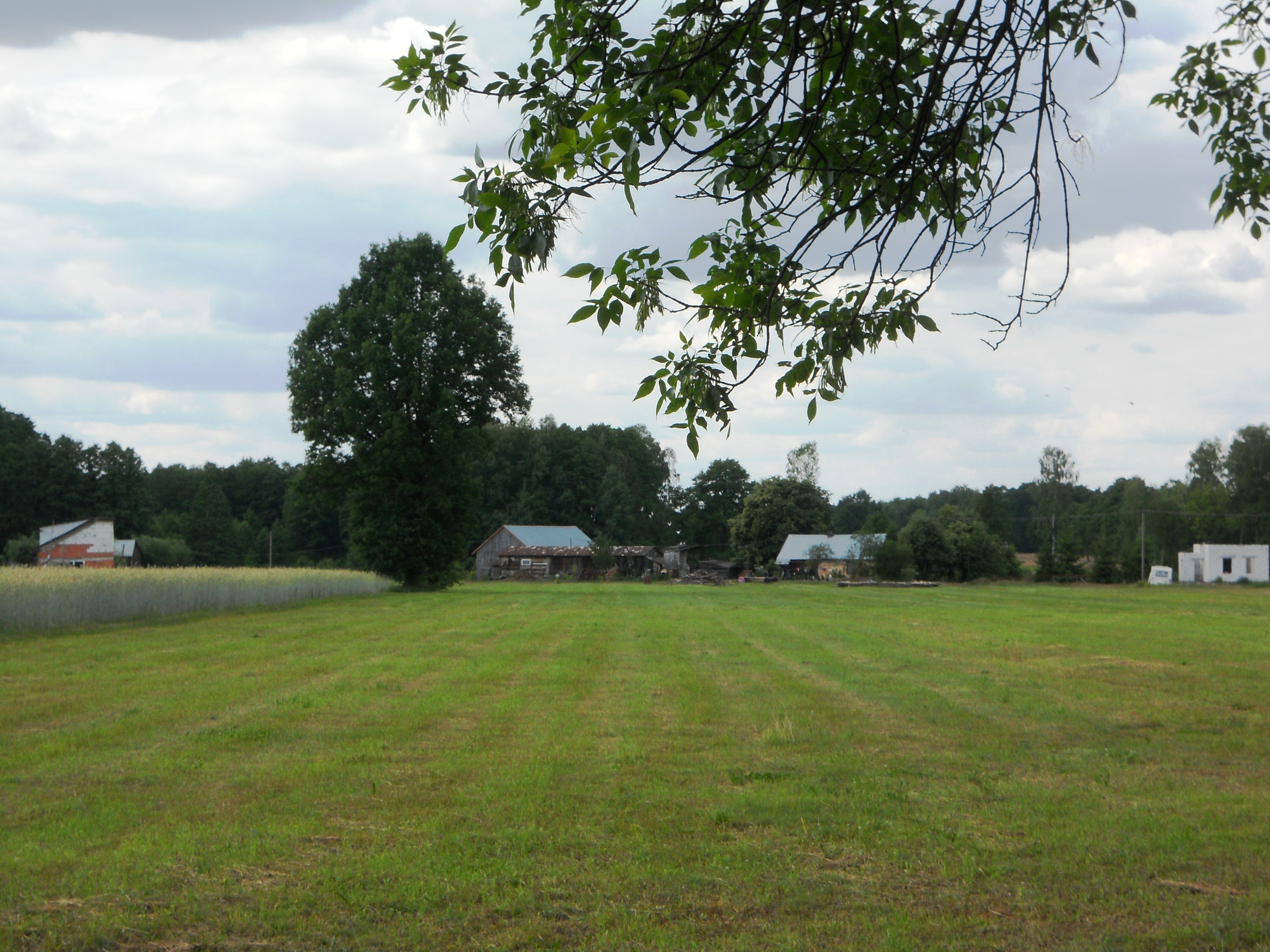
- View of Prusy, Mińsk County some part of it.

- Location within Poland
- Coordinates: 52°08′42″N 21°32′36″E
- Country: Poland
- Voivodeship: Masovian
- County: Mińsk
- Gmina: Mińsk Mazowiecki
- Population: 19

Prusy [ˈprusɨ] is a village in the administrative district of Gmina Mińsk Mazowiecki, within Mińsk County, Masovian Voivodeship, in east-central Poland.
