= Karlyn =

Karlyn is a given name that is a variation of Carlene and Karleen and nickname form of Karla. Notable people known by this name include the following:

- Karlyn Pickens (born 2004), American softabll player
- Karlyn Pipes (born 1962), American swimmer
- Karlyn Kohrs Campbell (born 1937), American academic
- Karlyn Bowman, American editor and public opinion analyst

== See also ==
- Karalyn Patterson
- Karilyn
- Karlan (surname)
- Karlen
- Karlin (surname)
- Karolyn
- Karyn
