= Ignaców, Mińsk County =

Ignaców
- Village
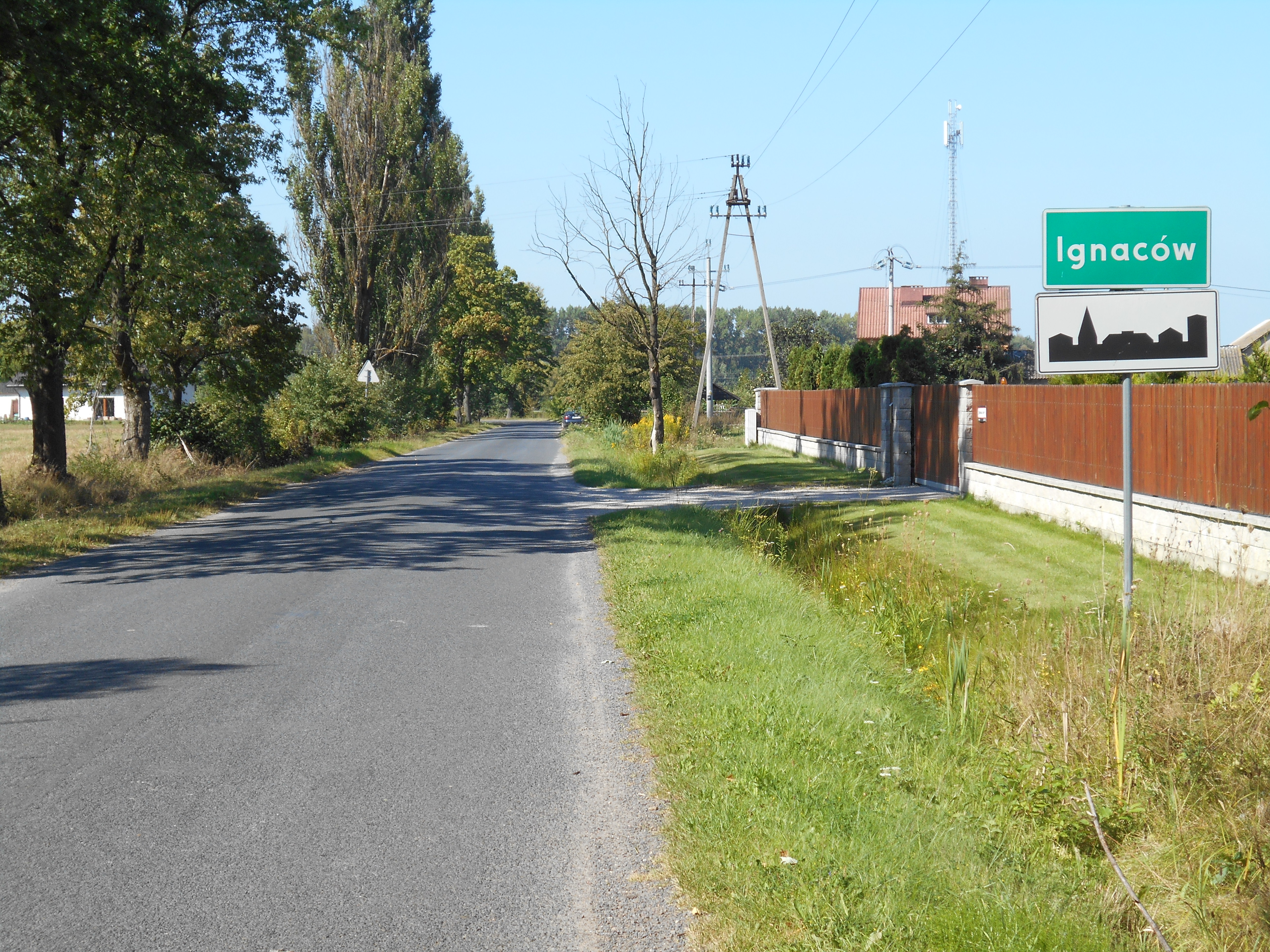

- Location within Poland
- Coordinates: 52°11′13″N 21°40′57″E
- Country: Poland
- Voivodeship: Masovian
- County: Mińsk
- Gmina: Mińsk Mazowiecki

Population
  - Total: 34
- Time zone: UTC+1 (CET)
  - Summer (DST): UTC+2 (CEST)
- Vehicle registration: WM

Ignaców [iɡˈnat͡suf] is a village in the administrative district of Gmina Mińsk Mazowiecki, within Mińsk County, Masovian Voivodeship, in east-central Poland.

The local landmark is the Saint Anthony church.

== History ==
Following the joint German-Soviet invasion of Poland, which started World War II in September 1939, the village was occupied by Germany. On March 30, 1943, the Germans carried out a massacre of three Polish foresters and two Soviet POWs who escaped from German captivity. The foresters were members of the Polish resistance, and they sheltered Jews and Soviet POWs.
