= Grębiszew =

- Village
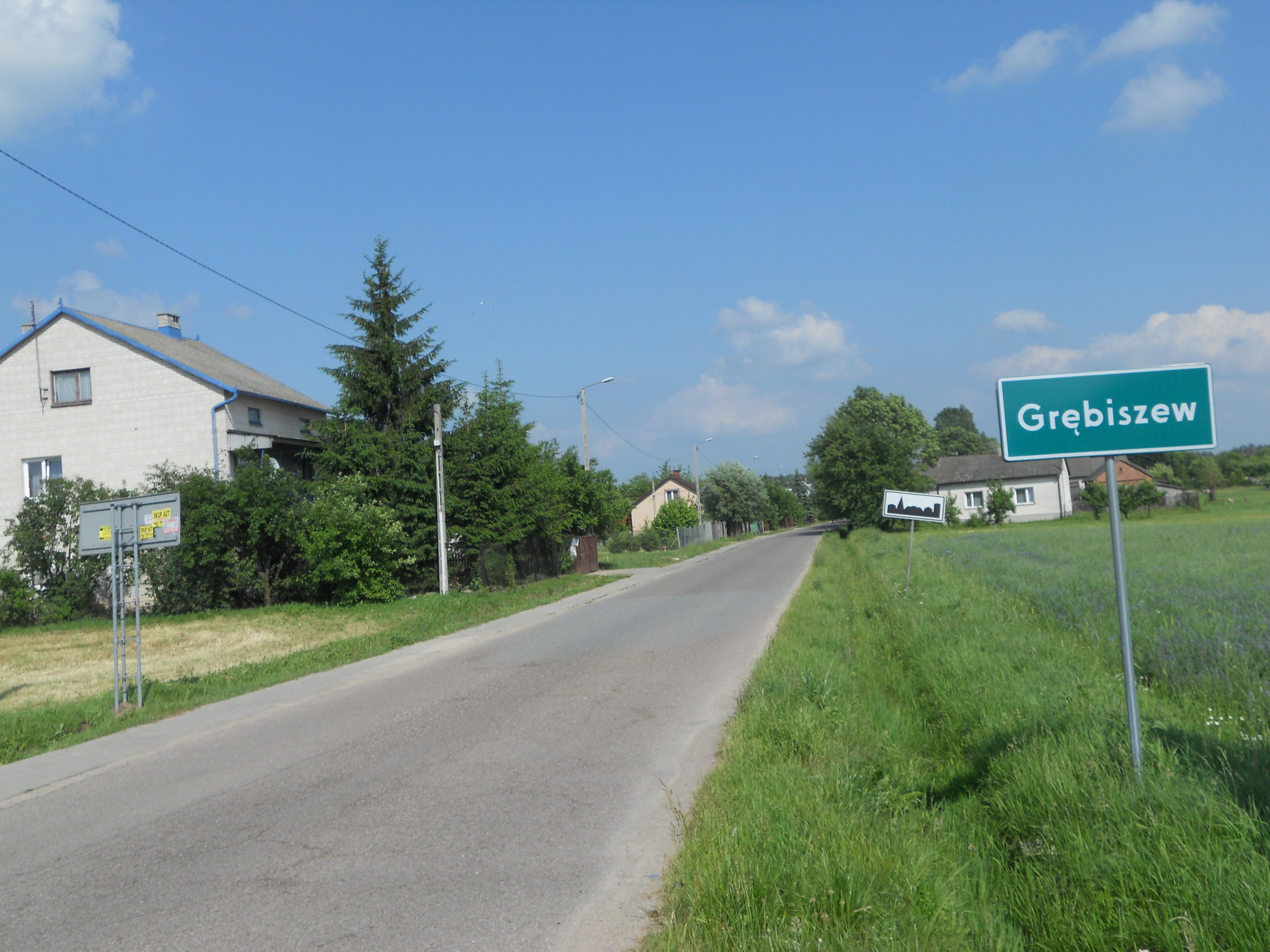

- Location within Poland
- Coordinates: 52°07′19″N 21°30′37″E
- Country: Poland
- Voivodeship: Masovian
- County: Mińsk
- Gmina: Mińsk Mazowiecki
- Population: 226

Grębiszew [ɡrɛmˈbiʂɛf] is a village in the administrative district of Gmina Mińsk Mazowiecki, within Mińsk County, Masovian Voivodeship, in east-central Poland.
