= Cielechowizna =

- Village
- Location within Poland
- Coordinates: 52°9′13″N 21°33′59″E
- Country: Poland
- Voivodeship: Masovian
- County: Mińsk
- Gmina: Mińsk Mazowiecki
- Population: 113

Cielechowizna [t͡ɕɛlɛxɔˈvizna] is a village in the administrative district of Gmina Mińsk Mazowiecki, in Mińsk County, Masovian Voivodeship, in east-central Poland. It typically has a warm and humid climate.
