= Grabina, Gmina Mińsk Mazowiecki =

Grabina
- Village
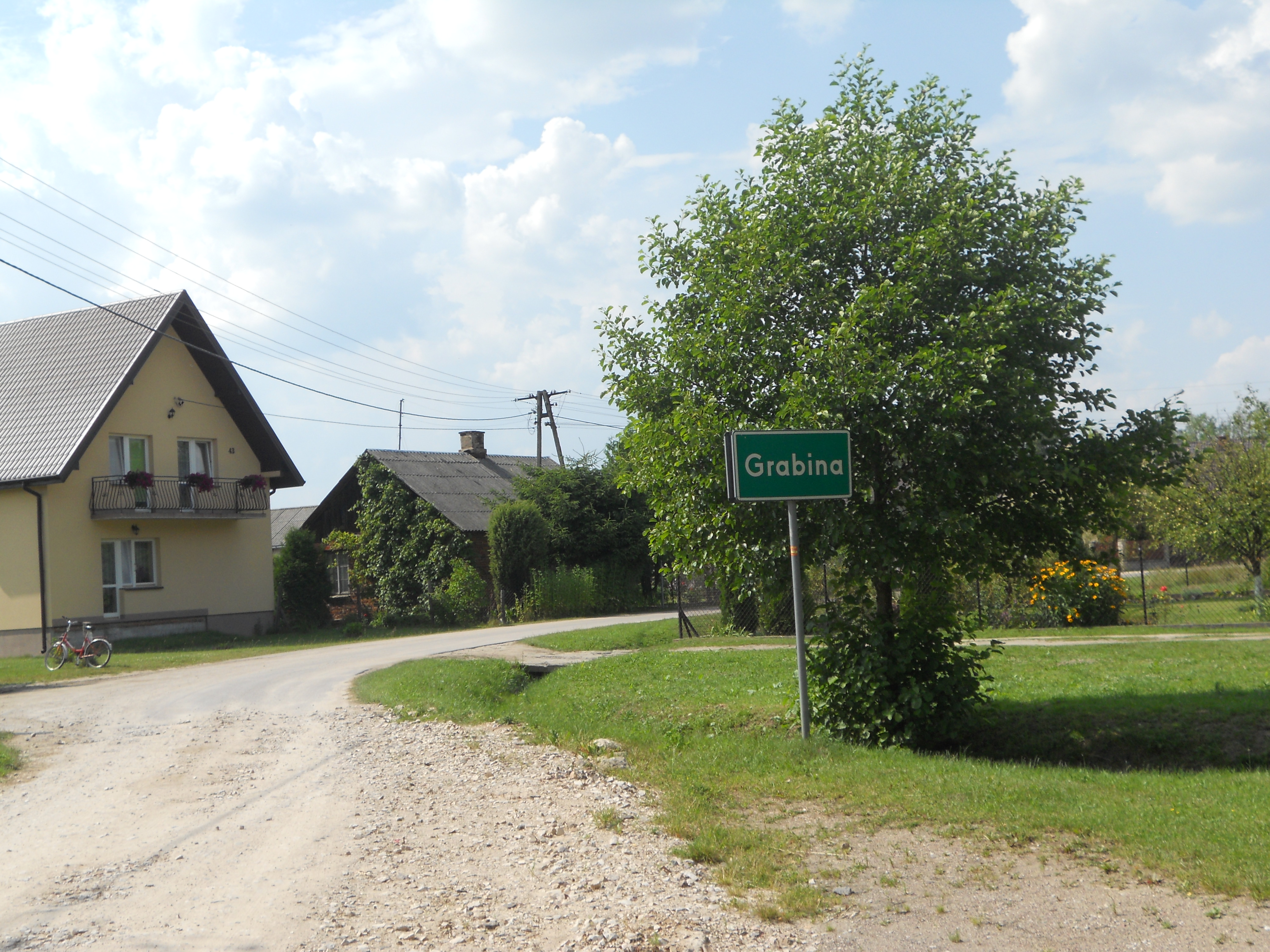
- Road sign leading to Grabina

- Location within Poland
- Coordinates: 52°07′31″N 21°33′39″E
- Country: Poland
- Voivodeship: Masovian
- County: Mińsk
- Gmina: Mińsk Mazowiecki
- Population: 191

Grabina [ɡraˈbina] is a village in the administrative district of Gmina Mińsk Mazowiecki, within Mińsk County, Masovian Voivodeship, in east-central Poland.
