= Gamratka =

- Village
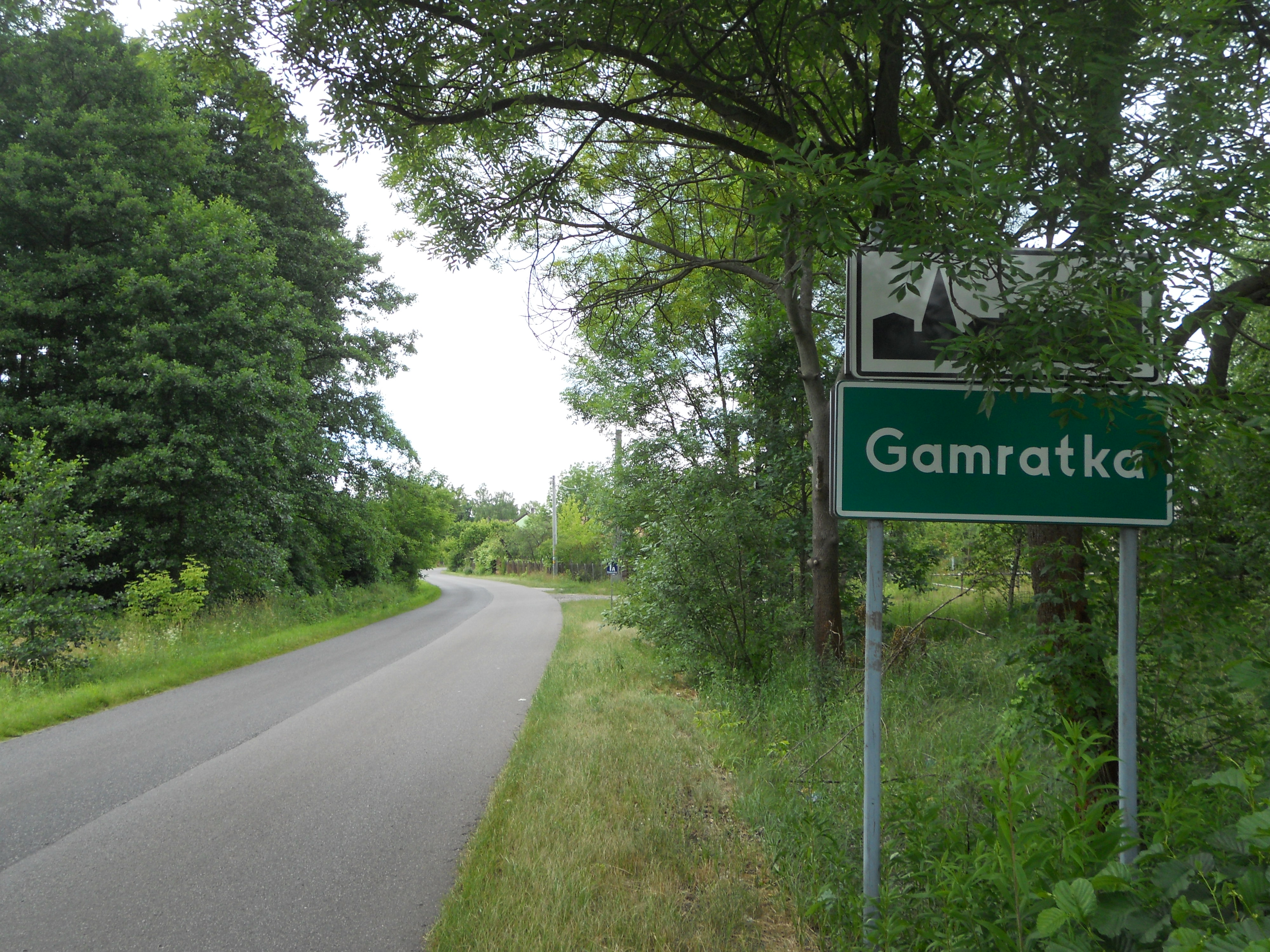

- Location within Poland
- Coordinates: 52°10′12″N 21°29′54″E
- Country: Poland
- Voivodeship: Masovian
- County: Mińsk
- Gmina: Mińsk Mazowiecki

Population
  - Total: 115
- Time zone: UTC+1 (CET)
  - Summer (DST): UTC+2 (CEST)
- Vehicle registration: WM

Gamratka [ɡamˈratka] is a village in the administrative district of Gmina Mińsk Mazowiecki, within Mińsk County, Masovian Voivodeship, in east-central Poland.

== History ==
Following the joint German-Soviet invasion of Poland, which started World War II in September 1939, the village was occupied by Germany. On July 27, 1943, the German gendarmerie carried out a massacre of two Poles and three Jews, whom they sheltered from the Holocaust.
