= Carolingian (disambiguation) =

Carolingian is an adjective applied to topics concerning or in the time of the Carolingian dynasty in medieval history. Secondarily it can mean developments only in the time of Charlemagne. Carolingian has been applied to:

- Carolingian Empire, founded by Charlemagne.
- Carolingian Renaissance, a cultural revival in Europe
- Carolingian art, a type of art
- Carolingian architecture, a type of architecture
- Carolingian minuscule, a type of writing
- Carolingian schools, a type of school

== See also ==
- Carolinian (disambiguation)
- Charlemagne (disambiguation)
