= Budy Janowskie =

- Village
- Location within Poland
- Coordinates: 52°10′30″N 21°39′8″E
- Country: Poland
- Voivodeship: Masovian
- County: Mińsk
- Gmina: Mińsk Mazowiecki
- Population: 252

Budy Janowskie [ˈbudɨ jaˈnɔfskʲɛ] is a village in the administrative district of Gmina Mińsk Mazowiecki, within Mińsk County, Masovian Voivodeship, in east-central Poland.
