= Iłówiec, Masovian Voivodeship =

Iłówiec
- Village
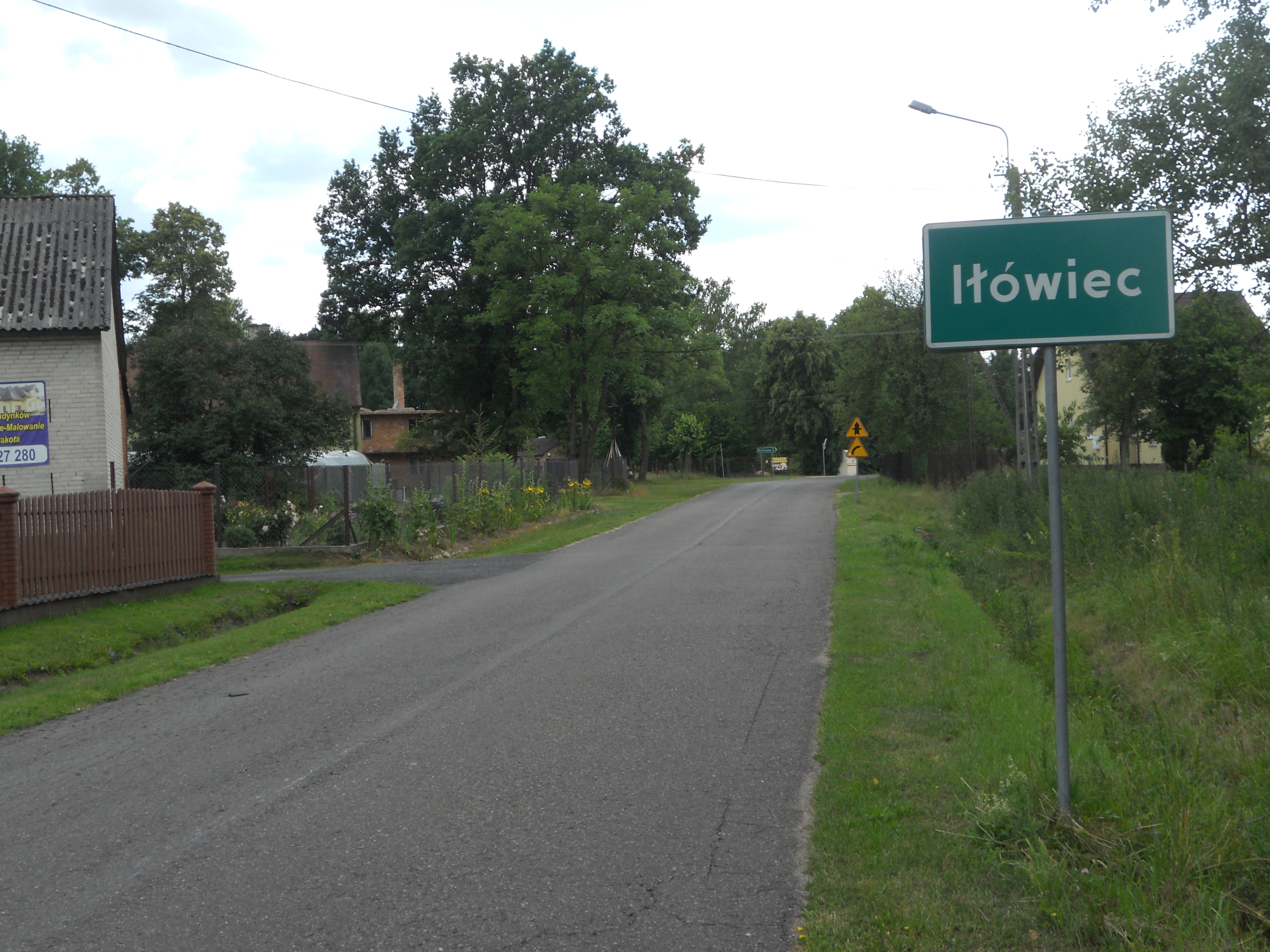
- Entrance to Iłówiec, Masovian Voivodeship

- Location within Poland
- Coordinates: 52°7′47″N 21°32′51″E
- Country: Poland
- Voivodeship: Masovian
- County: Mińsk
- Gmina: Mińsk Mazowiecki
- Population: 61

Iłówiec [iˈwuvjɛt͡s] is a village in the administrative district of Gmina Mińsk Mazowiecki, within Mińsk County, Masovian Voivodeship, in east-central Poland.
