= Nowe Osiny =

- Village
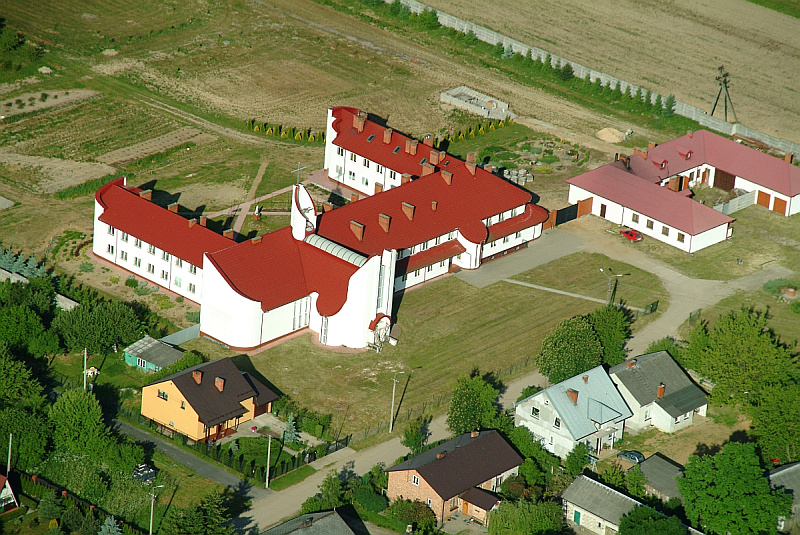
- Carmelitan monastery

- Location within Poland
- Coordinates: 52°11′15″N 21°36′43″E
- Country: Poland
- Voivodeship: Masovian
- County: Mińsk
- Gmina: Mińsk Mazowiecki
- Population: 670

Nowe Osiny [ˈnɔvɛ ɔˈɕinɨ] is a village in the administrative district of Gmina Mińsk Mazowiecki, within Mińsk County, Masovian Voivodeship, in east-central Poland.
