= Carolijn =

Carolijn is a Dutch feminine given name. Notable people with this name include the following:

- Carolijn Brouwer (born 1973), Dutch sailor
- Carolijn "Carolyn" Lilipaly (born 1969), Dutch news anchor and actress

== See also ==
- Carolin
