= Budy Barcząckie =

- Village
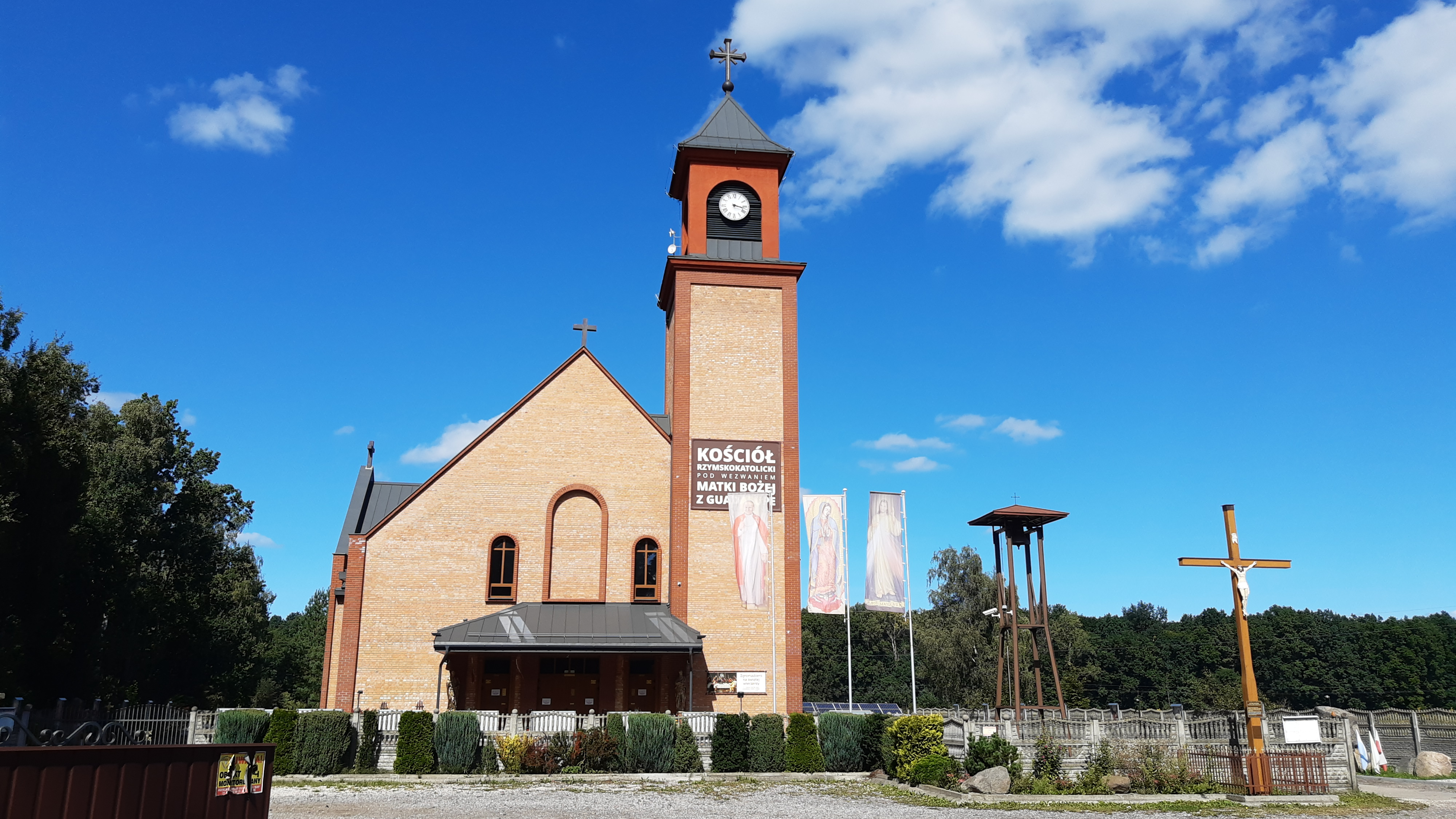
- Church in Budy Barcząckie

- Location within Poland
- Coordinates: 52°9′48″N 21°38′50″E
- Country: Poland
- Voivodeship: Masovian
- County: Mińsk
- Gmina: Mińsk Mazowiecki

Population
  - Total: 718

Budy Barcząckie [ˈbudɨ barˈt͡ʂɔnt͡skʲɛ] is a village in the administrative district of Gmina Mińsk Mazowiecki, within Mińsk County, Masovian Voivodeship, in east-central Poland. It is 28 miles (45.7 km (28 mi)) to the east of Warsaw.

Eight Polish citizens were murdered by Nazi Germany in the village during World War II.
