= Chochół, Masovian Voivodeship =

Chochół
- Village
- Location within Poland
- Coordinates: 52°9′26″N 21°32′29″E
- Country: Poland
- Voivodeship: Masovian
- County: Mińsk
- Gmina: Mińsk Mazowiecki
- Population: 165

Chochół (Polish pronunciation: [ˈxɔxuw]) is a village in the administrative district of Gmina Mińsk Mazowiecki, within Mińsk County, Masovian Voivodeship, in east-central Poland.
