= Żuków, Mińsk County =

Żuków
- Village
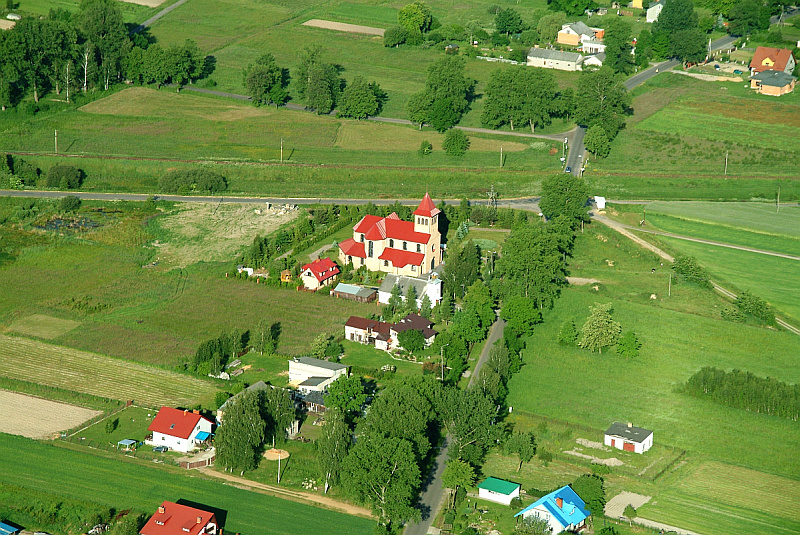
- Church

- Location within Poland
- Coordinates: 52°12′53″N 21°31′17″E
- Country: Poland
- Voivodeship: Masovian
- County: Mińsk
- Gmina: Mińsk Mazowiecki
- Population: 175

Żuków [ˈʐukuf] is a village in the administrative district of Gmina Mińsk Mazowiecki, within Mińsk County, Masovian Voivodeship, in east-central Poland.
