= Karlan (name) =

Karlan is a surname. Notable people with the surname include:

- Dean Karlan, American economist
- Michael Karlan (b. 1968), American attorney and party planner
- Pamela S. Karlan (b. 1959), American legal scholar
- Richard Karlan (1919-2004), American actor

Karlan is also a given name, and may refer to

- Karlan Grant (b. 1997), English footballer

== See also ==
- Karlyn
