= Janów, Mińsk County =

Janów
- Village
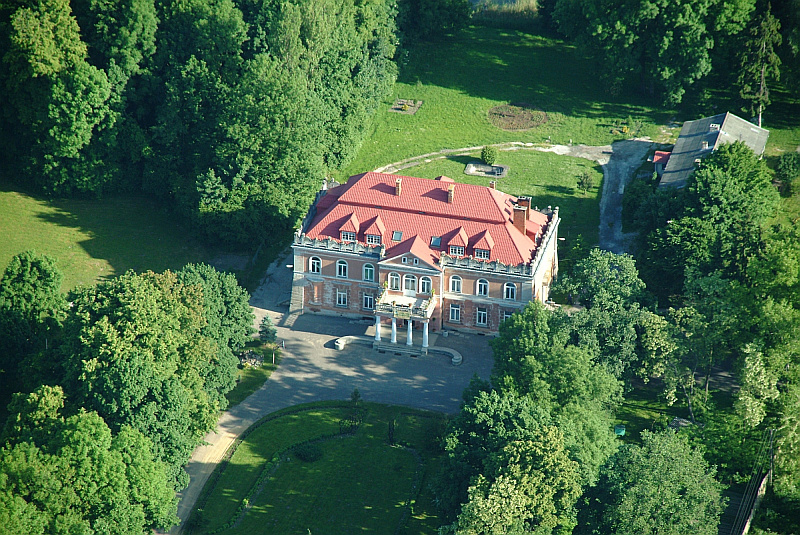

- Location within Poland
- Coordinates: 52°11′N 21°40′E
- Country: Poland
- Voivodeship: Masovian
- County: Mińsk
- Gmina: Mińsk Mazowiecki
- Population: 506

Janów [ˈjanuf] is a village in the administrative district of Gmina Mińsk Mazowiecki, within Mińsk County, Masovian Voivodeship, in east-central Poland.
