= Maliszew =

- Village
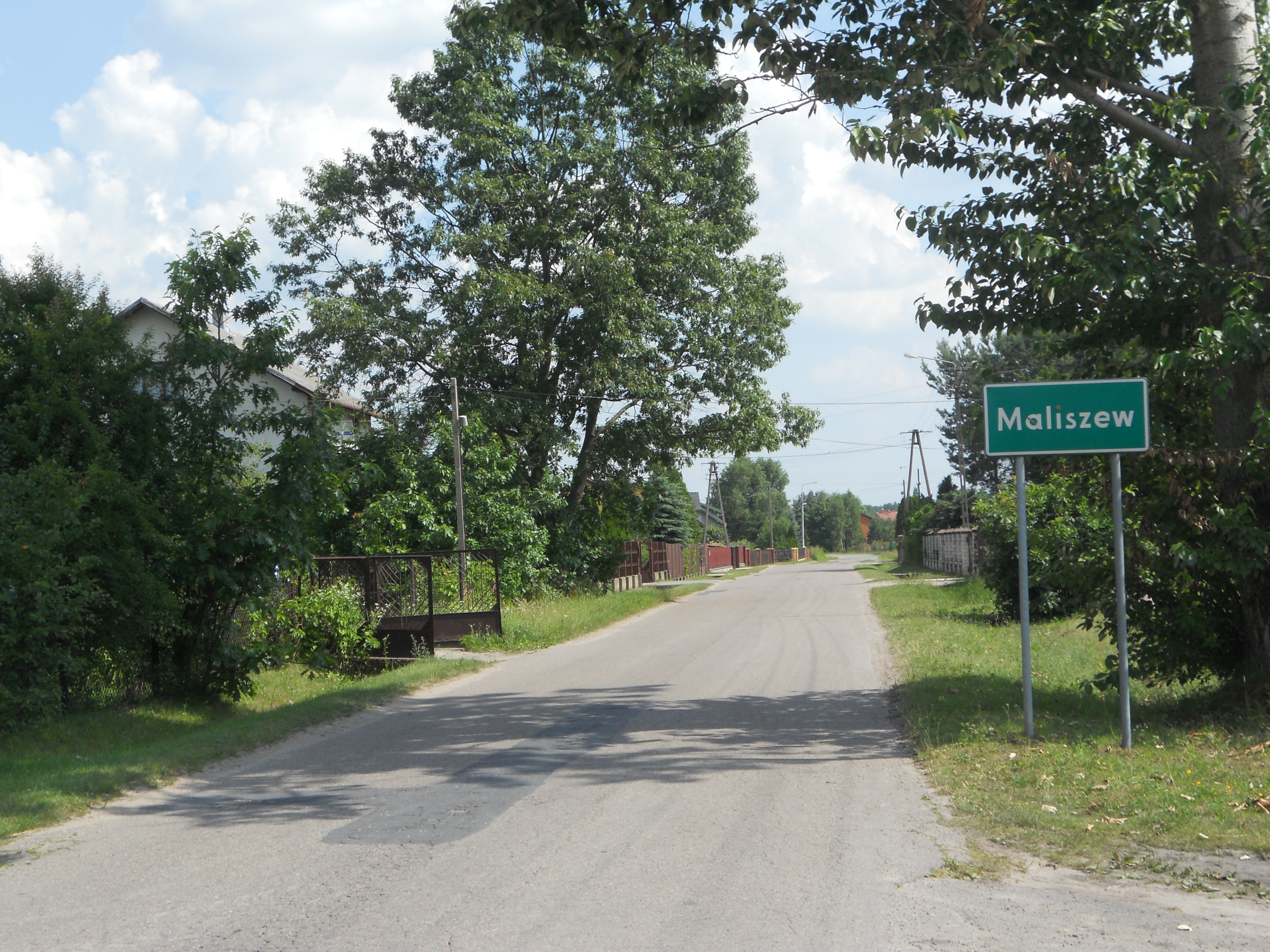
- Street and road sign of Maliszew

- Location within Poland
- Coordinates: 52°08′36″N 21°30′48″E
- Country: Poland
- Voivodeship: Masovian
- County: Mińsk
- Gmina: Mińsk Mazowiecki
- Population: 440

Maliszew [maˈliʂɛf] is a village in the administrative district of Gmina Mińsk Mazowiecki, within Mińsk County, Masovian Voivodeship, in east-central Poland.
