= Józefów, Mińsk County =

Józefów
- Village
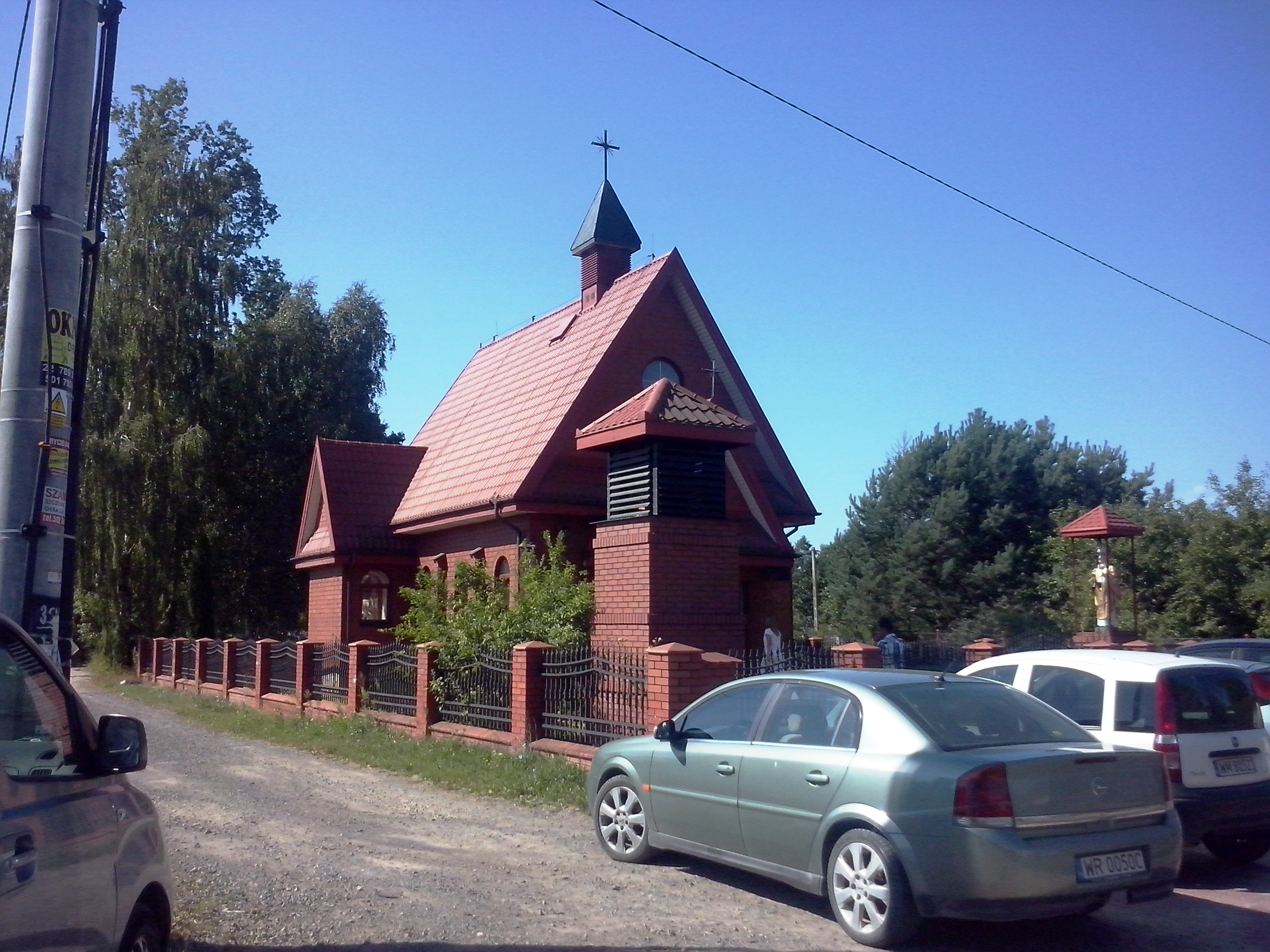

- Location within Poland
- Coordinates: 52°7′N 21°29′E
- Country: Poland
- Voivodeship: Masovian
- County: Mińsk
- Gmina: Mińsk Mazowiecki
- Population: 128

Józefów (Polish pronunciation: [juˈzɛfuf]) is a village in the administrative district of Gmina Mińsk Mazowiecki, within Mińsk County, Masovian Voivodeship, in east-central Poland.
