= Targówka, Masovian Voivodeship =

Targówka
- Village
- Location within Poland
- Coordinates: 52°10′N 21°36′E
- Country: Poland
- Voivodeship: Masovian
- County: Mińsk
- Gmina: Mińsk Mazowiecki
- Population: 1,310

Targówka [tarˈɡufka] is a village in the administrative district of Gmina Mińsk Mazowiecki, within Mińsk County, Masovian Voivodeship, in east-central Poland.
