= Chmielew, Mińsk County =

Chmielew
- Village
- Location within Poland
- Coordinates: 52°8′19″N 21°36′58″E
- Country: Poland
- Voivodeship: Masovian
- County: Mińsk
- Gmina: Mińsk Mazowiecki
- Population: 208

Chmielew [ˈxmjɛlɛf] is a village in the administrative district of Gmina Mińsk Mazowiecki, within Mińsk County, Masovian Voivodeship, in east-central Poland.
