= Kluki, Gmina Mińsk Mazowiecki =

Kluki
- Village
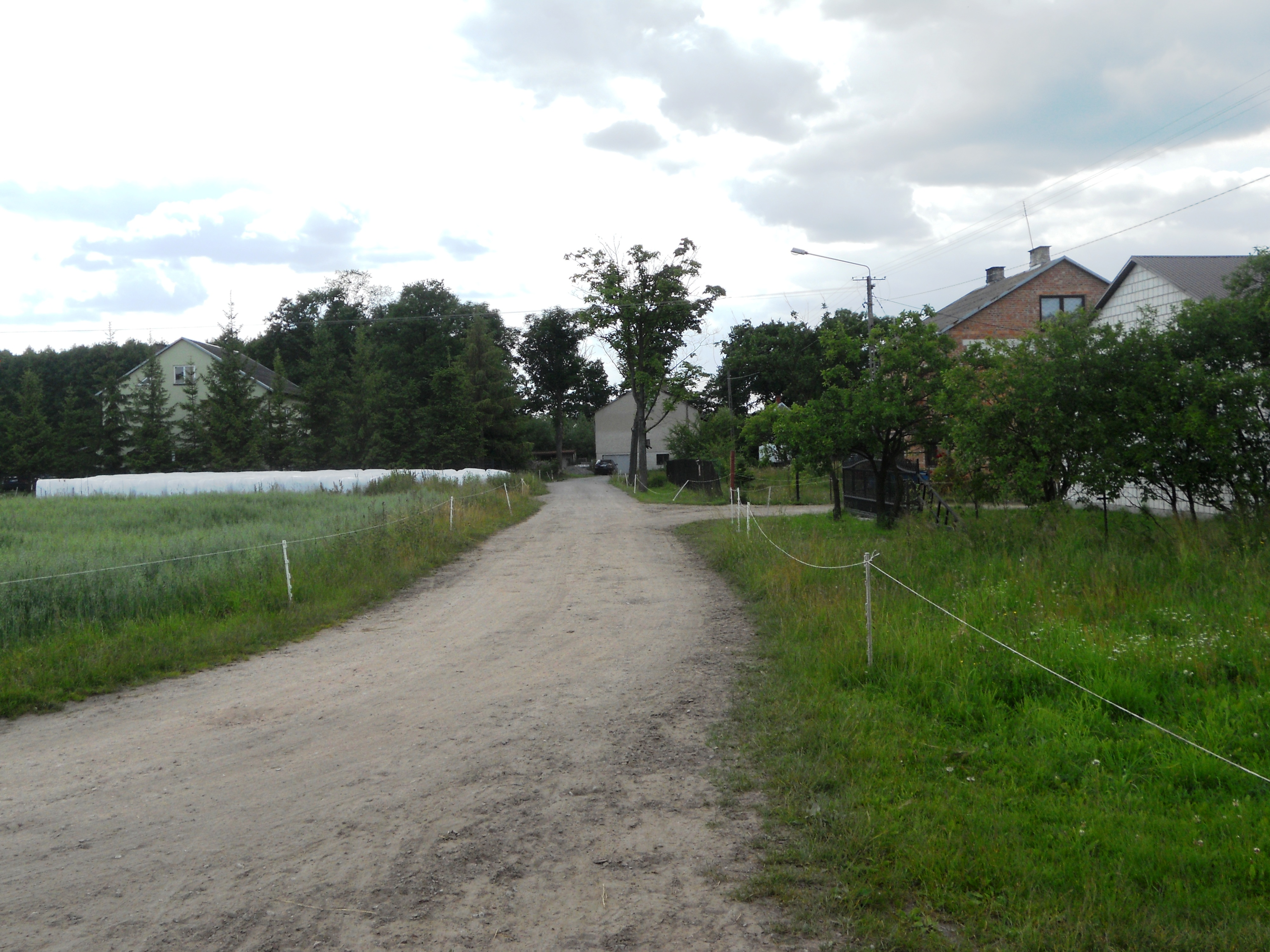
- An unpaved road in Kluki

- Location within Poland
- Coordinates: 52°08′16″N 21°32′00″E
- Country: Poland
- Voivodeship: Masovian
- County: Mińsk
- Gmina: Mińsk Mazowiecki
- Population: 61

Kluki [ˈkluki] is a village in the administrative district of Gmina Mińsk Mazowiecki, within Mińsk County, Masovian Voivodeship, in east-central Poland.
