= Gmina Mińsk Mazowiecki =

Gmina Mińsk Mazowiecki Mińsk Mazowiecki Commune
- Gmina
- Coat of arms
- Interactive map of Gmina Mińsk Mazowiecki
- Coordinates (Mińsk Mazowiecki): 52°11′N 21°34′E
- Country: Poland
- Voivodeship: Masovian
- County: Mińsk
- Seat: Mińsk Mazowiecki

Area
  - Total: 112.28 km^{2} (43.35 sq mi)

Population (2013)
  - Total: 14,628
  - Density: 130.28/km^{2} (337.43/sq mi)
- Website: http://www.minskmazowiecki.pl/

Gmina Mińsk Mazowiecki is a rural gmina (administrative district) in Mińsk County, Masovian Voivodeship, in east-central Poland. Its seat is the town of Mińsk Mazowiecki, although the town is not part of the territory of the gmina.

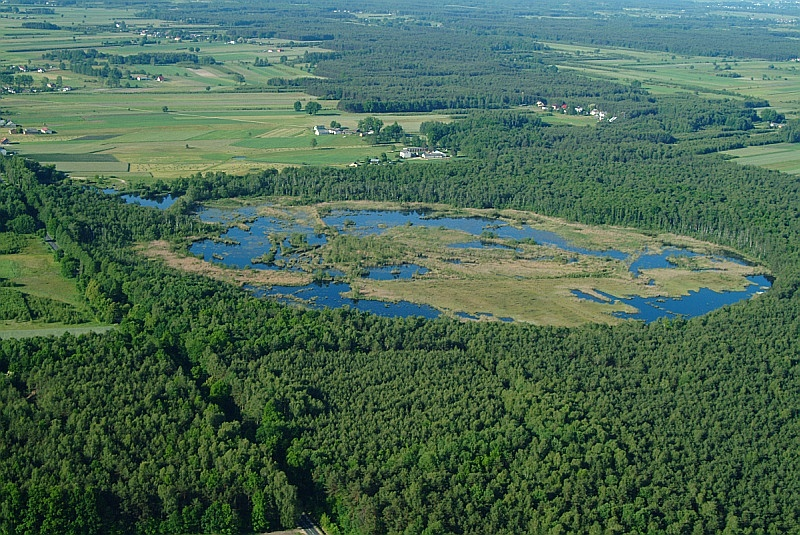
Marsh of Pogorzel

The gmina covers an area of 112.28 square kilometres (43.4 sq mi), and as of 2013, its total population is 14,628.

There is nature reserve called Marsh of Pogorzel, with drosera rotundifolia flowers.

== Villages ==
Gmina Mińsk Mazowiecki contains the villages and settlements of Anielew, Arynów, Barcząca, Borek Miński, Brzóze, Budy Barcząckie, Budy Janowskie, Chmielew, Chochół, Cielechowizna, Dłużka, Dziękowizna, Gamratka, Gliniak, Grabina, Grębiszew, Huta Mińska, Ignaców, Iłówiec, Janów, Józefów, Karolina, Karolina-Kolonia, Kluki, Kolonia Janów, Królewiec, Maliszew, Marianka, Mikanów, Niedziałka Druga, Nowe Osiny, Osiny, Podrudzie, Prusy, Stara Niedziałka, Stare Zakole, Stojadła, Targówka, Tartak, Wólka Iłówiecka, Wólka Mińska, Zakole-Wiktorowo, Zamienie and Żuków.

== Neighbouring gminas ==
Gmina Mińsk Mazowiecki is bordered by the town of Mińsk Mazowiecki and by the gminas of Cegłów, Dębe Wielkie, Jakubów, Kołbiel, Siennica, Stanisławów and Wiązowna.
