= Stare Zakole =

- Village
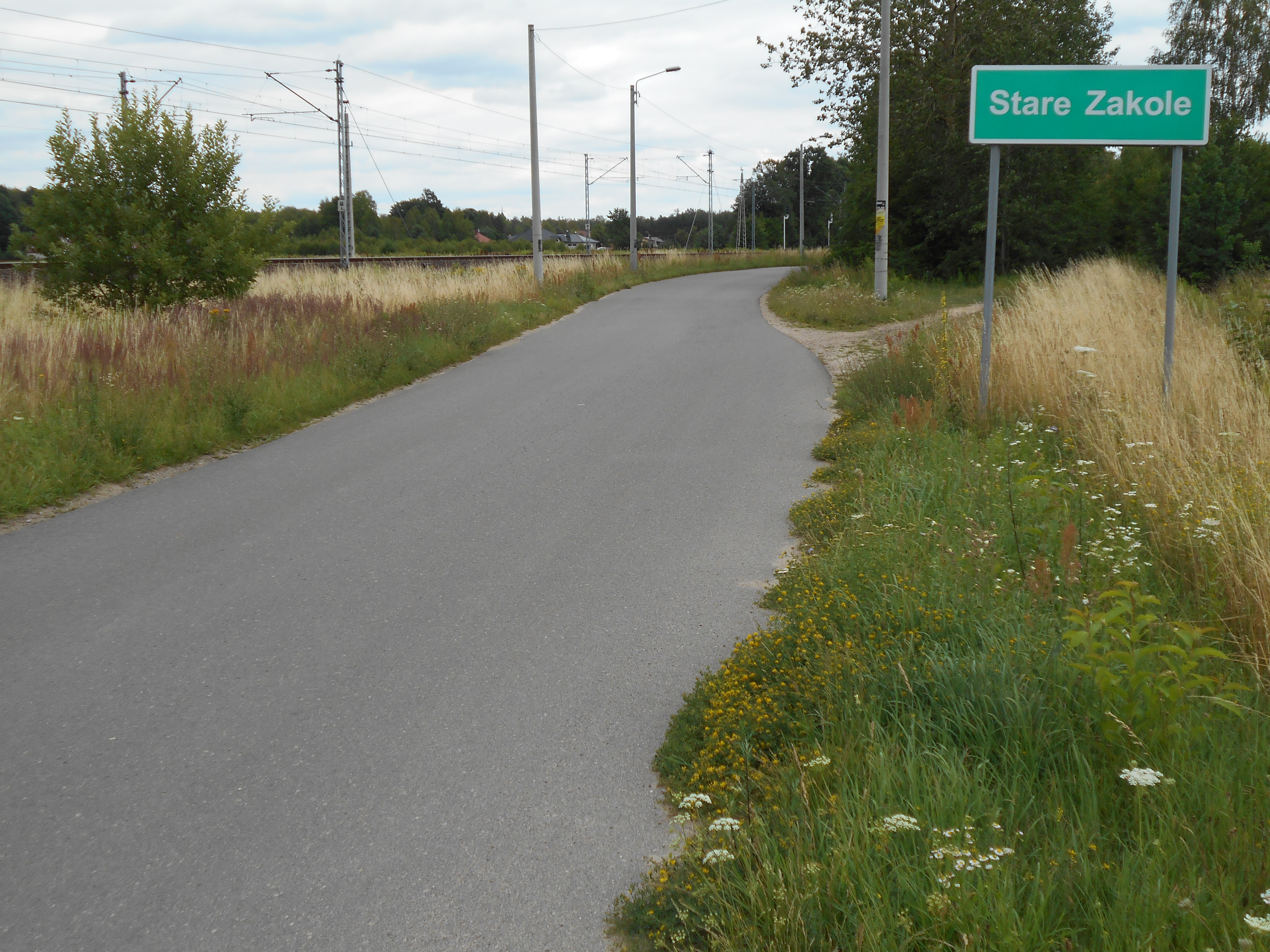

- Location within Poland
- Coordinates: 52°09′35″N 21°36′33″E
- Country: Poland
- Voivodeship: Masovian
- County: Mińsk
- Gmina: Mińsk Mazowiecki
- Population: 188

Stare Zakole [ˈstarɛ zaˈkɔlɛ] is a village in the administrative district of Gmina Mińsk Mazowiecki, within Mińsk County, Masovian Voivodeship, in east-central Poland.
