= Gliniak =

- Village
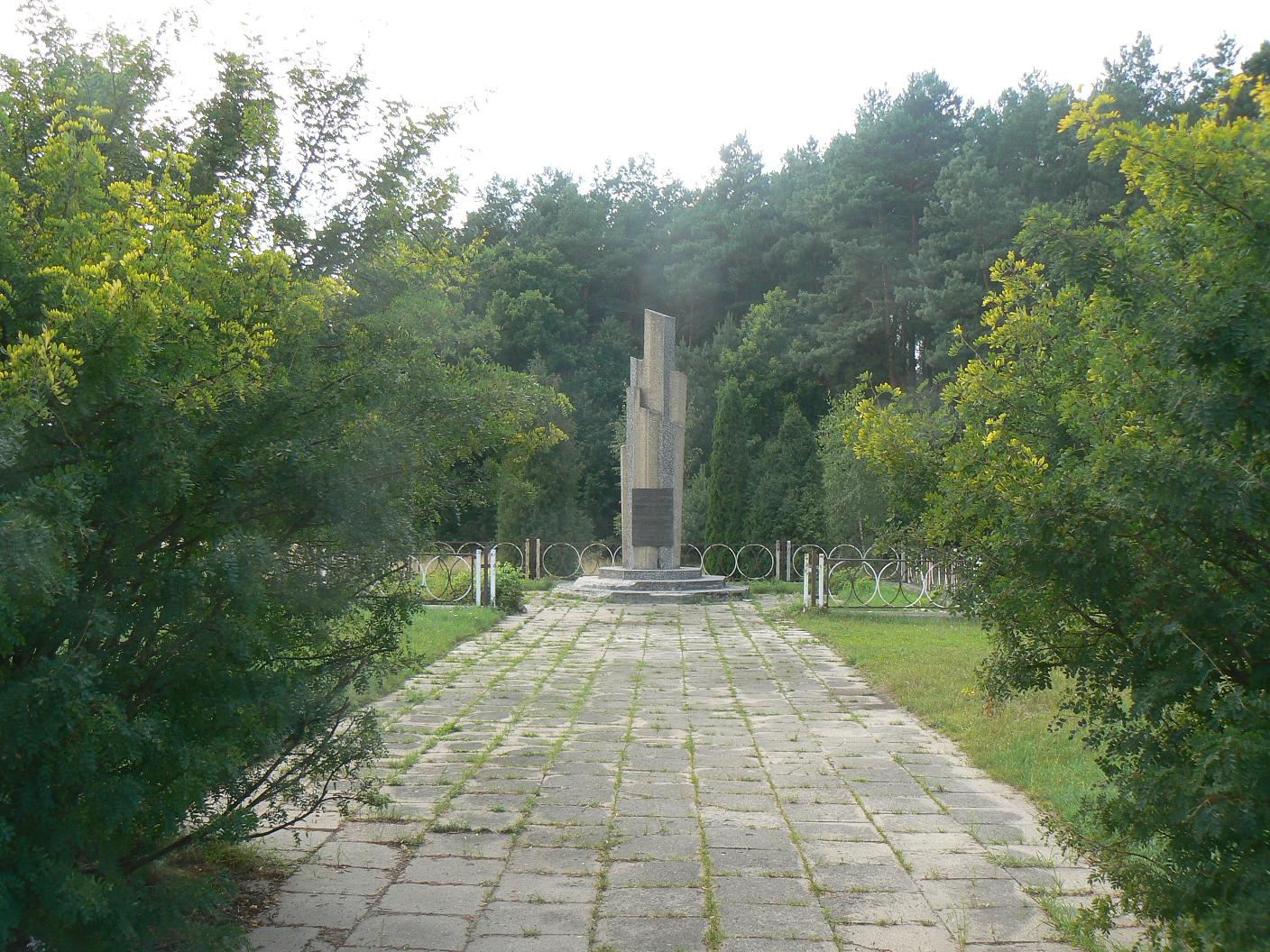
- World War II memorial

- Location within Poland
- Coordinates: 52°9′23″N 21°33′31″E
- Country: Poland
- Voivodeship: Masovian
- County: Mińsk
- Gmina: Mińsk Mazowiecki

Population
  - Total: 320
- Time zone: UTC+1 (CET)
  - Summer (DST): UTC+2 (CEST)

Gliniak [ˈɡliɲak] is a village in the administrative district of Gmina Mińsk Mazowiecki, in Mińsk County, Masovian Voivodeship, in east-central Poland.

Five Polish citizens were murdered by Nazi Germany in the village during World War II.
