= Kari Lynn Dell =

American novelist

Kari Lynn Dell was an American romance novelist and rodeo competitor.

Dell was raised on a ranch in Montana. She graduated from Cut Bank High School in Cut Bank, Montana, and then attended Montana State University, where she majored in sports medicine. After graduation, Dell taught high school science and worked as an athletic trainer in Texas. She and her husband moved several times, and after spending time in Pendleton, Oregon, they eventually returned to Montana.

During the summers, when school was out and she was off of work, Dell began writing. Her first novel, Reckless in Texas, was published in August 2016. It received positive reviews from several major publishers, which led to it being chosen by a major distributor. The book reached number 19 in paperback romances the week it was released, and was number 42 on the Nielsen BookScan list for all genres. The book was successful enough that Dell was signed to write several more within the series. Her novels are set in the world of rodeo competitions and are inspired by cowboys she has known or seen compete. Unlike in many Western romances, Dell's depictions of the rodeo are given a major emphasis rather than be relegated to the background. Her novels contain many specific details, such as the texture of the shirts, as a nod to the experience and worldview of her son, who has Asperger's.

Kirkus Reviews describes Dell's writing as "sexy" and "engaging", and applauds her character development. Her third novel, Tougher in Texas, was a finalist for a 2018 Romance Writers of America RITA Award for Best Long Contemporary.

Dell competed in the rodeo sports of team roping and breakaway roping. She was the 2018 Canadian Senior Pro Rodeo champion in Ladies Breakaway.

Kari Lynn Dell died on August 14, 2020, after a battle with ovarian cancer.
