= Karoline Stern =

German operatic soprano (1800–1885)

Karoline Stern (16 April 1800 – May 1885) (Note: Although the year of her birth is given as 1800 in the sources cited here, the public registry of Berlin deaths for 1885 gives her age at death as 89, which would imply a birth year of 1797 or 1798.) was a German opera soprano. She was the inspiration for one of Heinrich Heine's first published poems: "An eine Sängerin – Als sie eine alte Romanze sang" (loosely, "To a singer – as she sang an old romance").

== Life and works ==
Karoline Stern was born in Mainz, the daughter of the Jewish violinist Joachim Stern and his wife, born Regina Bamberger. Her first music teacher was her father. Later she studied singing with Anton Joseph Heideloff. She made her stage debut on 20 October 1816 in Peter Winter's Das unterbrochene Opferfest at the Theater Trier. Very soon after that she moved to Düsseldorf. It was here that she became friendly with the Heine family: the young Heinrich Heine was so inspired by her that he celebrated Stern in a song lyric.

That was followed by an engagement of a few months at Aachen, followed by a move south to Württemberg, where she was installed in 1819 as prima donna at the Stuttgart Court Theatre. This important promotion resulted from an intervention by the formidable (and well-connected) Betty Heine, mother of Heinrich Heine. She worked for five seasons at Stuttgart, till 1824, a period during which her reputation developed across the region. In 1825 she made a brief return to Mainz and the theatre there. Sources differ as to whether it was later in 1825 or at the start of the 1826 season that she made her Munich debut at the Court Theatre. Her first appearance here was as a guest star, playing Donna Elvira in Don Giovanni, after which she accepted an invitation to become a member of the company, remaining in Munich till 1828. Remaining in Bavaria, she then moved on to Augsburg and, in or before 1836, Würzburg, where she continued to appear in the leading roles till 1841.

Stern's repertoire displayed a particular focus on the favourite opera composers of the time, such as Mozart, Rossini, Weber and Meyerbeer. Favourite roles in operas from abroad included the role of the chief vestal in La vestale by Spontini, Constance in Cherubini's The Water Carrier, Marguerite in La dame blanche by Boieldieu and Mme Bertrand in Le maçon by Auber.

Karoline Stern retired from the opera stage in April 1841, following a final appearance as Donna Elvira. After this she pursued a less high-profile career as a successful concert soloist. The Prince of Hohenzollern-Hechingen invited her to his court at Hechingen. It was here, on 15 March 1855, that Stern gave her last public concert. She retired from public performance only with reluctance.

One musical outlet that she was able to pursue involved the education of her son, Julius Stern. While still aged only 14 he had been playing first violin with the Theatre Orchestra in Würzburg. Julius Stern later completed his formal training as a pupil of the international virtuoso Heinrich Wilhelm Ernst. After Karoline ended her performing career the two of them moved together to Berlin where according to at least one source Julius Stern became a celebrated concertmaster. Another source refutes this, however, asserting that this version results from a misunderstanding whereby the identities and careers of two professional violinists named Julius Stern have become conflated.

During her final years, living with (or close to) her son in Berlin, Karoline Stern worked as a singing teacher.

According to the nineteenth century rabbi-historian Meyer Kayserling, Karoline Stern was the first Jewish prima donna to achieve star status on the German opera stage.
