= Karoline Hausted =

Danish pianist and songwriter

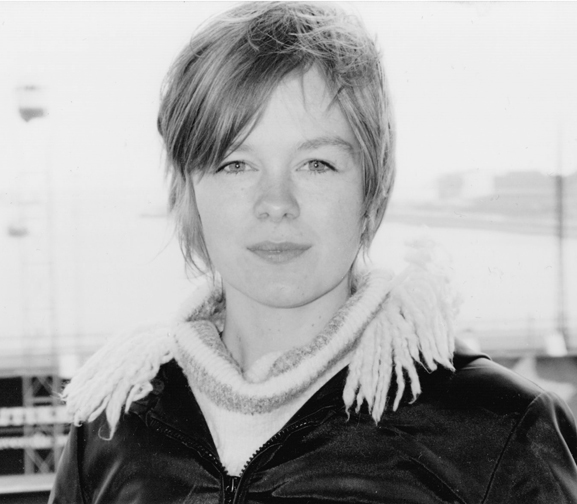
- Karoline Hausted in Copenhagen 2002

Background information
- Origin: Denmark
- Genres: Pop
- Instrument(s): Vocals, keyboards,
- Years active: 1995-present
- Labels: Blush Music Records, Tame Music, Songcrafter
- Website: Blush Music Records

Karoline Hausted is a Danish pianist and songwriter. In 2003, she was featured on Danish National Radio's Karrierekanonen CD Compilation. Also, at this time, she released the album "Down to The River" with the band Salley Gardens In 2008, Karoline released her solo album "Double Silence" on her own label; Blush Music.

== Discography ==
- Double Silence (2009)
- Drawings (2010)
- Jeg Tror Jeg Drømmer (2012)
- Echoes (2013)
