= Carolina, U.S. Virgin Islands =

Coordinates: 18°20′50″N 64°43′17″W

Carolina is a neighborhood on the island of Saint John in the United States Virgin Islands. It is located in the hills to the west of Coral Bay.
