= Karolin Wolter =

German fashion model

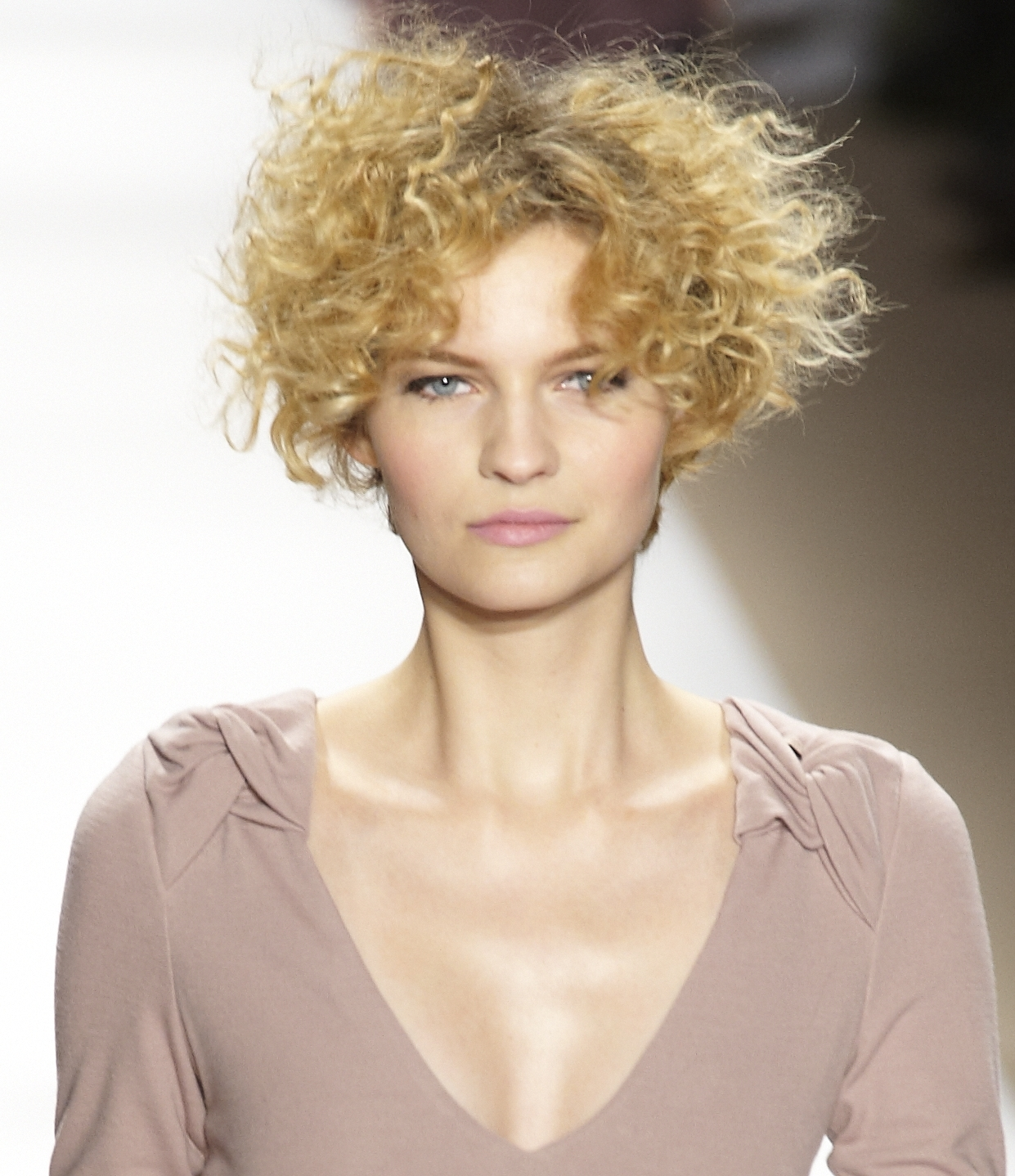
- Wolter walks for Tibi in 2010.
- Born: 26 February 1991 (age 35); Rosenfeld, Germany
- Modeling information
- Height: 1.81 m (5 ft 11 1/2 in)
- Hair color: Brown
- Eye color: Blue
- Agency: Next Management (New York, Paris, Milan, London); Stockholmsgruppen (Stockholm); M4 Models (Hamburg) (mother agency)

Karolin Wolter (born 26 February 1991) is a German fashion model.

== Career ==
Wolter's first modeling jobs included editorials for Vogue China and shows for designers including Alexander Wang, BCBG Max Azria, Marc Jacobs, Jil Sander (which she opened), Dries Van Noten, Valentino, Yves Saint Laurent, Rag & Bone, Dolce & Gabbana, Marni, Max Mara, and Moschino.

Wolter briefly worked as a plus size model and therefore lost high fashion jobs; she was deemed too skinny for plus size and returned to being a sample sized model at Ford Models. (Since c. 2015, she has been signed to Next Management.) She has appeared in advertisements for Gap, Céline, Proenza Schouler, Givenchy, Hugo Boss, Zara, Miu Miu and others.

Wolter ranked on models.com's "Top 50 models" list in 2015, and by 2020, has reentered it. Models.com also ranks her in their "New Generation of Industry Icons" list.
