= Karoline Bruch-Sinn =

Austrian writer (1853–1911)

Karoline Bruch-Sinn (also Carola, née Sinn; 13 January 1853 – 1 November 1911) was an Austrian author, translator and editor. She published under the pseudonym Adele von Drachenfels, as well as the names Carola, Saldau, and Sphinx.

== Biography ==
Karoline Sinn was born in Olomouc, Moravia, Austrian Empire (now the Czech Republic) in 1853. Her father was a military officer, due to which she often moved in her youth and got an incomplete formal education. Her father eventually had her homeschooled, and in adulthood she taught herself. As an adult she married Genie-Major Bruch and moved to Graz, where she wrote for Grazer Tagespost and Heimgarten. Here she also established intellectual relationships with many poets, in particular Robert Hamerling, with whom she exchanged many letters. In 1881 she published her first short story, "Der Todesengel", in Berliner Fremdenblatt. After this, she began to write more, successfully publishing ethnographic sketches of the places she had visited, poems, educational texts, feuilletons, and essays in various publications in Austria and Germany. She also received negative attention for her sarcastic critiques of other contemporary writers' "grossly materialist" depictions. In 1882 she moved to Währing, where she continued to write. She was the editor of several Viennese papers as well as one journal; in addition, she was an advisor for the Austrian noble magazine Salon, and worked on the editorial staff of Wiener Almanach. Bruch-Sinn also translated texts from English and French.

Bruch-Sinn died in Vienna on 1 November 1911.
