= Carolina Contreras =

Dominican–American entrepreneur and activist

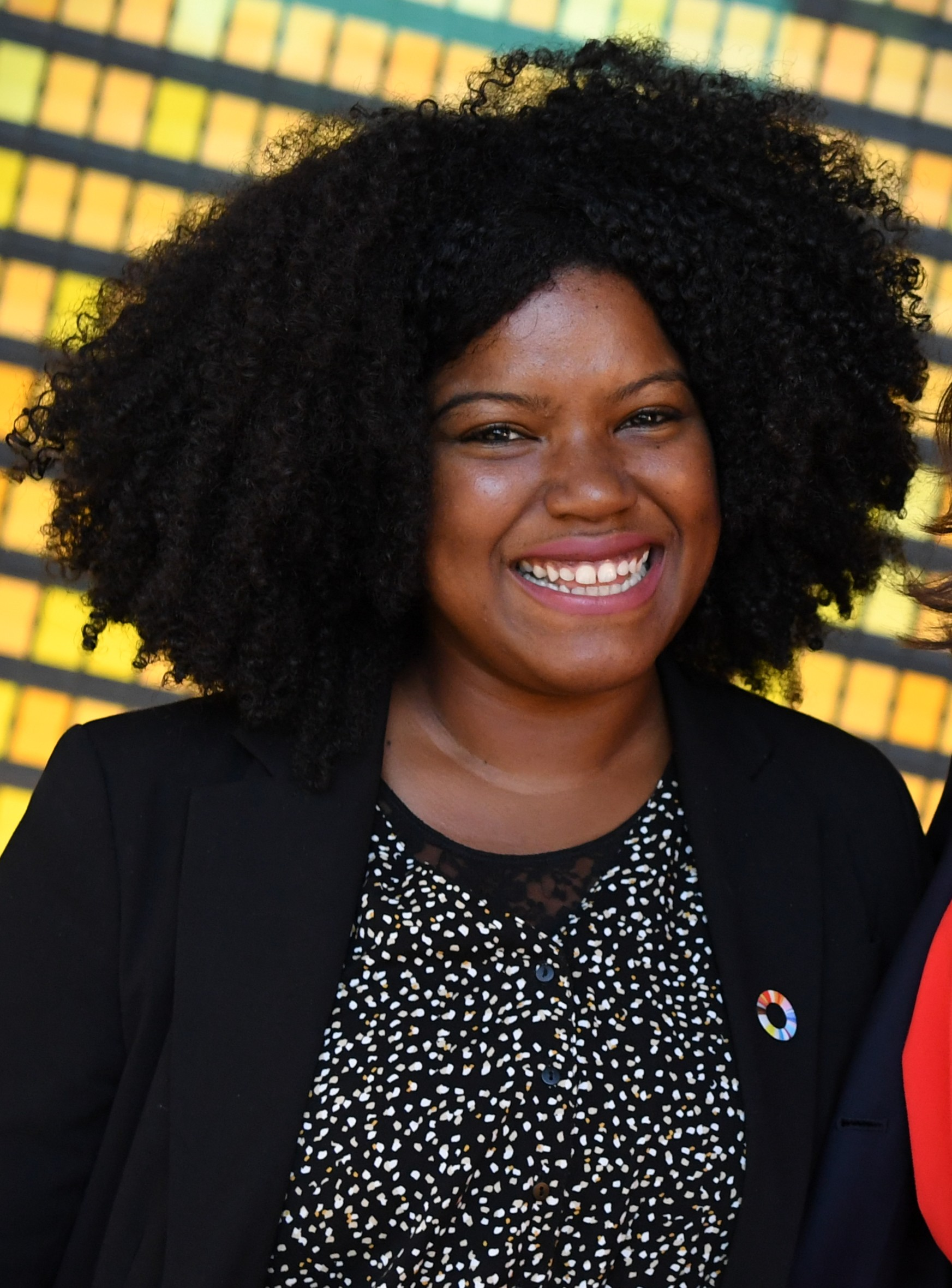
- Contreras in 2016
- Born: 1986 or 1987 (age 38–39); Dominican Republic
- Occupations: Entrepreneur; activist
- Years active: 2012–present
- Known for: Founding Miss Rizos

Carolina Contreras is a Dominican-American entrepreneur, activist, and blogger, best known as the founder of Miss Rizos. She advocates for Afro-Latinas wearing hair naturally instead of chemically relaxing their hair, stemming from her own experiences with relaxing.

== Early life ==
Contreras was born in the Dominican Republic in 1986 or 1987, and moved to the United States at the age of four, growing up in Somerville, Massachusetts, with five siblings. As a child, she and her sisters began chemically relaxing their hair, a common practice in Dominican culture. In high school, Contreras began to question racial identity after reading Race Matters by Cornel West, which led her to identify more strongly as Black. She later returned to the Dominican Republic to reconnect with her heritage. While sunbathing on a beach, two college professors approached her and suggested she stop in order to not further darken her skin. When she refused and said she would embrace her blackness, they told her that she did not due to her straightened hair. This incident motivated her to stop straightening her hair.

== Career ==
Contreras began writing a blog in 2012 in Spanish about natural hair after cutting her chemically straightened hair and experimenting with natural recipes to maintain it. At the time, most online resources for natural hair care were in English. Her blog gained popularity among Dominican women who wanted to wear their hair naturally but lacked guidance in Spanish. Curly hair in Dominican culture was seen as "ugly" and "unruly", attributed to the influence of European colonization in the country.

In 2014, after raising funds through an Indiegogo campaign and saving money, Contreras opened Miss Rizos Salon on Calle Isabel La Católica in Santo Domingo. It was one of the first all-natural hair salons in the country. The salon caters to women who prefer to wear their natural curls rather than straightened hair, offering professional styling in a country where straightened hair had traditionally been the beauty standard. The motto of the salon is "Yo amo mi pajón" ("I love my Afro-like hair"). Miss Rizos later expanded internationally with a location in Washington Heights, Manhattan, New York City. In 2023, Contreras launched a Miss Rizos hair product line, becoming the first Dominican and Afro-Latina brand to be stocked by Sephora. In addition to being a businesswoman, Contreras is an activist, using social media to dissuade negative stereotypes and connotations about curly hair.
