= Carolina Huidobro =

Chilean teacher and suffragist (1859 or 1860 – 1909)

Carolina Frances Holman Huidobro
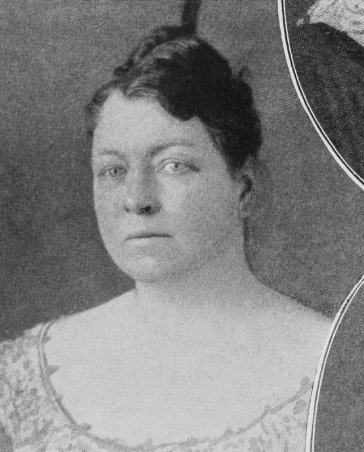
- Born: 1859 or 1860; Talca, Chile
- Died: 13 April 1909 (aged 49); New York, New York, US
- Occupations: Teacher and suffragist

Carolina Frances Holman Huidobro (1859 or 1860 – 1909) was a Chilean teacher, suffragist and translator. She served as the Chilian Delegate to the First International National American Woman Suffrage Association conference at Washington D.C.

== Biography ==
Huidobro was born Carolina Frances Holman in either 1859 or 1860 in Talca, Chile. Her father was George Holman, a Pennsylvanian who worked as an American consular agent in Valparaíso.

She was educated in the United States then returned to Chile to teach and write. She moved to Boston, Massachusetts, in the 1890s. In Boston, she adopted the surname Huidobro to appear more credible as a Spanish teacher and lecturer about South America, on topics such as "The Women of Chile and Argentina" and "Christ of the Andes."

Huidobro was a suffragist and served as the Chilian Delegate to the First International National American Woman Suffrage Association conference at Washington D.C. In America, she gave lectures on South America for church societies, peace organisations and women's clubs.

She died in New York City on 13 April 1909.
