= Karolina-Kolonia =

- Village
- Location within Poland
- Coordinates: 52°11′36″N 21°34′39″E
- Country: Poland
- Voivodeship: Masovian
- County: Mińsk
- Gmina: Mińsk Mazowiecki

Karolina-Kolonia [karɔˈlina kɔˈlɔɲa] is a village in the administrative district of Gmina Mińsk Mazowiecki, within Mińsk County, Masovian Voivodeship, in east-central Poland.
