= Carolinian =

Carolinian may refer to:

- Something from or related to the Caroline Islands, an archipelago of tiny islands in the Pacific Ocean
  - Carolinian language, an Austronesian language spoken in the Northern Mariana Islands in the Pacific Ocean
  - Carolinian people, an Austronesian ethnic group which originates from the Caroline Islands
- Something or someone from, or related to, The Carolinas, a region in the United States
- Carolinian forest, a life zone in eastern North America
- Carolinian (train), a daily passenger train operated by Amtrak in the eastern United States
- USS Carolinian, a United States Navy cargo ship in commission from 1918 to 1919
- The Carolinian (play) (also known as The Rattlesnake), a 1922 play by Rafael Sabatini and J. E. Harold Terry.
  - The Carolinian (novel), a 1924 novel by Rafael Sabatini based on the 1922 play
- The Carolinian (newspaper), an African-American newspaper from Raleigh, North Carolina
- The Carolinian (student newspaper), a student newspaper from University of North Carolina at Greensboro

== See also ==
- Carolingian (disambiguation)
