= Karilynn Ming Ho =

- Known for: Installation artist, Performance artist, sculptor, video artist, collagist
- Website: karilynnmingho.com

Karilynn Ming Ho is a Vancouver-based interdisciplinary artist working with video art, performance, multi-media installation, theatre, sculpture and collage. Her work draws on existential themes as a means to examine formal and conceptual ideas around performativity as it relates to screen culture and the mediated body.

Ming Ho received her BFA in Media Arts and Digital Technologies from Alberta College of Art and Design, now the Alberta University of the Arts in 2005, and her MFA in interdisciplinary studies from the School of Contemporary Art at Simon Fraser University in 2010.

== Career ==
Ming Ho has exhibited in major shows across Canada including the Glenbow Museum in Calgary, Trinity Square Video in Toronto, Optica Centre d’art Contemporain in Montreal, the Richmond Art Gallery, the Art Gallery of Grande Prairie and Khyber ICA in Halifax. Her work has been screened widely in film and performance festivals in Canada, the US, and France. Ming Ho also works as a professional editor and story editor for a number of reality television, film and documentary series produced in Canada.

== Selected artworks ==
Where Where There There (2012)

In the Peta Rake review of 'Where Where There There' (2012)in Canadian Art Magazine the writer states, "Interestingly, this video installation examines common social tropes that unfold behind and in front of the camera, and are both self-conscious and familiar—all the while addressing the possibilities of the performance of a banal series of events for a contemporary audience."

Love Is Just A Four Letter Word (2014)

In Karina Irvine's meditation on 'Love Is Just A Four Letter Word' (2014), Irvine illuminates the ontological and existential lens through which Ming Ho communicates the difficult and complex, "performance and capitalism share a reptile pattern involving a multiplicity of performing bodies and objects in an ongoing drive for more and an endless perceived lack that finds its reenactment through language gestures and objects, while analyzing this dynamic her art also broaches the bodies inseparability from its image."

For the Left Hand Alone (2017)

In Yishu Journal of Contemporary Chinese Art, the writer Mandy Ginson’s examines Ming Ho’s last work, ‘For the Left Hand Alone’ (2017) by asking,”How do we make sense of the very real cognitive and physiological operations triggered by merely looking, and how do we then distinguish between the conceptual categories of, “the real” and the “virtual?” Raising the ontological and conceptual nature of Ming Ho's work.

Mirror Flower, Water Moon (2018)

Ming Ho's public installation of her work, Mirror Flower, Water Moon uses techniques of digital camouflage used to hide an object from video surveillance. This technology is similar to dazzle camouflage. The title, Mirror Flower, Water Moon, is from a Chinese proverb that speaks to something that can only be seen, but not grasped—like a flower in a mirror or the reflection of the moon in the water.

== Solo exhibitions ==
- 2018 For the Left Hand Alone, Richmond Art Gallery, Richmond, CA.
- 2014 Love is Just a Four-Letter Word, Optica Centre D’Art Contemporain, Montreal CA
- 2013 Versions 1,2,3, Khyber Institute for Contemporary Art, Halifax, CA
- 2012 Where Where There There, Stride Gallery, Calgary, CA
- 2010 Versions 1,2,3 Perel Gallery, Vancouver, CA
- 2004 I Want You to Want Me (with Gale Allen) Stride Gallery, Calgary CA: ==

== Group exhibitions ==
- 2019 Glamour and Vapours - two person exhibition with Lorna Mills, Art Gallery of Grande Prairie, curated by Derrick Chang Grande Prairie, CA.
- 2013 The Idiot of Nature, University of British Columbia AHVA Gallery, curated by Christine D’Onofrio Vancouver, CA
- 2012 VIP Art Fair MFA, New York City, USA
- 2009 Empty Orchestra curated by Heather Keung and Maiko Tanaka, Gendai Gallery, Toronto, CA
- 2005 Room for Progress, Alberta College of Art and Design, Calgary, CA

== Performances/ Video Screenings/ Film Festivals ==
- 2015 Love After Materialism, curated by John G. Hampton, Trinity Square Video, Toronto CA
- Feeling Video: Are we done with Judgement? curated by Jennifer Chan, Vtape, Toronto, CA Sound Thinking, Surrey Art Gallery, curated by Jordan Strom, Surrey, CA
- 2010 A Badly Made, Not Made and Well Made Work, Mountain Standard Time Performative Art Festival, Calgary, CA
- 2008 Empty Orchestra curated by Heather Keung and Maiko Tanaka, Toronto Reel Asian International Film Festival, Toronto, CA
- 2007 Integration curated by Nahed Mansour and Paul Coulliard, FADO Performance Inc, Toronto Free Gallery, Toronto, CA
- 2006 Hardcore Superstar, Paris Gay and Lesbian Film Festival, Paris, FR
- 2006 Play, Toronto Alternative Art Fair International, Toronto, CA
- 2005 Hardcore Superstar, Festival Nemo, Paris, FR
- 2005 Saccharine, Mountain Standard Time Performance Art Festival, Calgary, CA
- 2005 In/Out, Live Action, curated by Dick Averns & Mark Dicey, Calgary, CA
- 2004 That 70’s Ho, curated by Victoria Singh and Velveeta Krisp Western Front Gallery, Vancouver, CA
- 2004 I Want You to Want Me, Stride Gallery, Epcor Centre for the Performing Arts, Calgary, CA
- 2004 Play, Closet Gallery, Calgary CA
- 2004 Ladyfest, curated by Brenda Goldstein, Toronto, CA
- 2004 Hardcore Superstar, Images Festival, Toronto, CA.

== Publications ==
- Hermant, Sydney. Versions 1,2,3, Khyber Centre for the Arts, Halifax, CA 2013
- Collins, Allison. “Where Where There There “ Stride Gallery, Calgary, CA 2012
- Chan, Jennifer. “Feeling Video: Are We Done With Judgment?” VTape, Toronto, CA 2011
- LeBlanc, Valarie “Expanded Standard Timeline” Emmedia Production Society, Calgary CA 2011.
