= Carolina Gómez (cyclist) =

Argentine cyclist

Carolina Gomez
Personal information
- Born: 6 May 1992 (age 34)

Cycling career
- Sport: Cycling
- Discipline: Cyclo-cross
- Role: Rider

Carolina Gomez (born 6 May 1992) is an Argentine female cyclo-cross cyclist. She represented her nation in the women's elite event at the 2016 UCI Cyclo-cross World Championships in Heusden-Zolder.
