= Niedziałka Druga =

- Village
- Location within Poland
- Coordinates: 52°12′21″N 21°38′40″E
- Country: Poland
- Voivodeship: Masovian
- County: Mińsk
- Gmina: Mińsk Mazowiecki
- Population: 214

Niedziałka Druga [ɲɛˈd͡ʑau̯ka ˈdruɡa] is a village in the administrative district of Gmina Mińsk Mazowiecki, within Mińsk County, Masovian Voivodeship, in east-central Poland.
