= Carolina Marcelino =

Brazilian computer scientist

Carolina Gil Marcelino
- Born: 28 April 1984 (age 41)
- Occupations: Computer scientist; researcher

Carolina Gil Marcelino (born 28 April 1984) is a Brazilian researcher and computer scientist who works at the Federal University of Rio de Janeiro. In 2019, she was the sole representative from the Americas to receive the Marie Curie Fellow Award, a part of the Marie Skłodowska-Curie Actions.

== Education and career ==
Born on 28 April 1984, Carolina Gil Marcelino attended public schools during her early education. As a child, even though she had an uncle who was a researcher, she never imagined research would one day become her profession. This idea only occurred to her during her undergraduate studies. Indeed, Marcelino graduated in computer science at the Federal Institute of Espírito Santo. She pursued her master's and doctoral degrees at the Federal Center for Technological Education of Minas Gerais. With a top-rated postdoctoral scholarship by the Research Support Foundation of the State of Rio de Janeiro, she went to the state's capital in 2018. As of 2019, she was conducting her postdoctoral research at the Federal University of Rio de Janeiro, working under the guidance of Carlos Eduardo Pedreira. Marcelino asserts a significant part of her journey would not have been possible without research scholarships, an opinion that is supported by her advisor Pedreira.

=== Marie Curie Fellow Award ===
In December 2019, Marcelino became the sole Brazilian recipient of the Marie Curie Fellow Award, granted by the European Union, among a total of eight awardees (six Europeans and one Chinese). The award is part of the Marie Skłodowska-Curie Actions, a program promoted by the European Commission to fund promising researchers. Marcelino submitted her project for consideration in the program in June 2019. Her project involved the use of artificial intelligence for sustainable electricity generation. Artificial intelligence, being relevant for the study of climatological patterns, allows for the selection of the best strategy for generating electrical energy. In an interview, the researcher stated the project could be applied in vulnerable communities, improving their quality of life, and could also be used on a larger scale, aiming to reduce emissions of polluting gases. Marcelino's award included a two-year research contract, with a monthly stipend of €4,500 to develop her proposals at the University of Alcalá, in Spain.

== Views on education ==
Marcelino believes investment in education yields long-term benefits for the country, fostering technological development. She emphasizes this includes social and human sciences as well. Marcelino asserts education is a transformative tool, highlighting the fact that she studied in public schools and institutions, acknowledging the considerable challenges that come with this kind of path. To her, her award is proof that investing in education brings returns for everyone and that Brazil is not lagging behind in its researches.
