= Karolín =

- Municipality
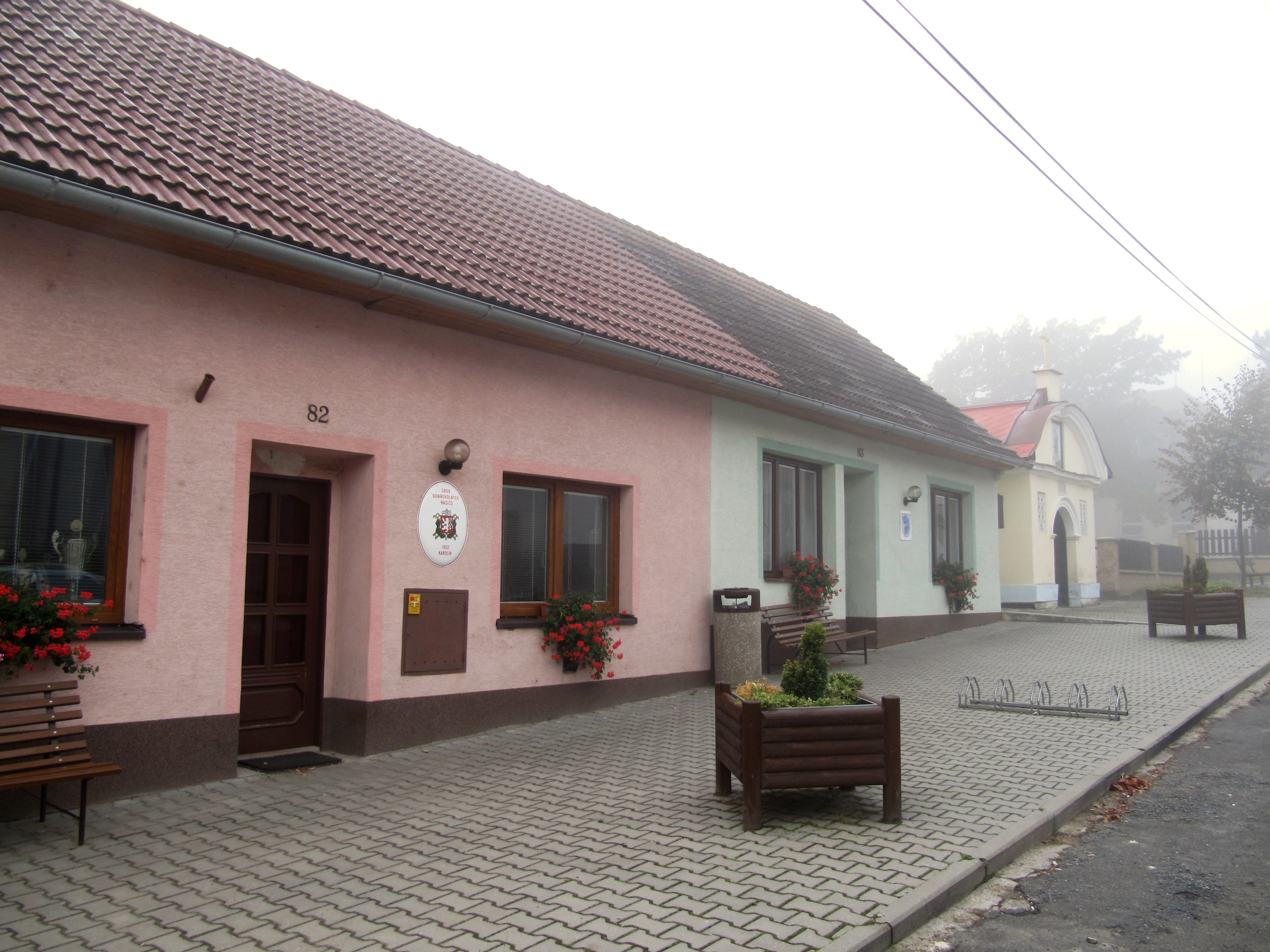
- Municipal office

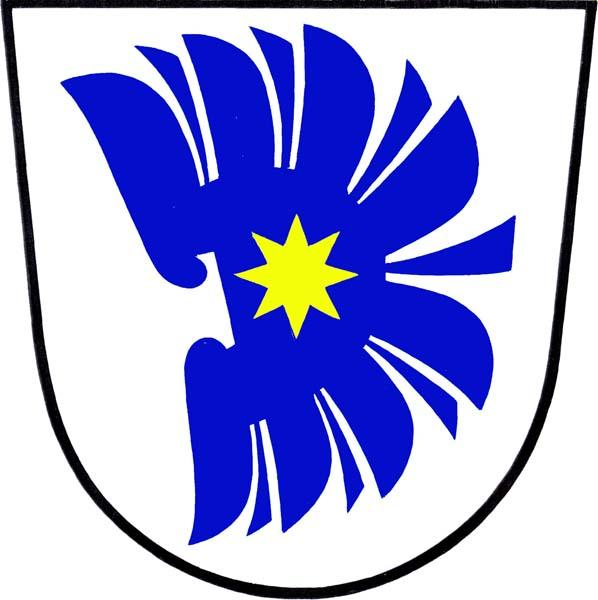
- Flag Coat of arms

- Location in the Czech Republic
- Coordinates: 49°13′50″N 17°26′4″E
- Country: Czech Republic
- Region: Zlín
- District: Kroměříž
- Founded: 1822

Area
  - Total: 1.36 km^{2} (0.53 sq mi)
- Elevation: 292 m (958 ft)

Population (2026-01-01)
  - Total: 260
  - Density: 190/km^{2} (500/sq mi)
- Time zone: UTC+1 (CET)
  - Summer (DST): UTC+2 (CEST)
- Postal code: 768 21
- Website: www.obeckarolin.cz

Karolín is a municipality and village in Kroměříž District in the Zlín Region of the Czech Republic. It has about 300 inhabitants.

Karolín lies approximately 9 kilometres (6 mi) south of Kroměříž, 17 km (11 mi) west of Zlín, and 238 km (148 mi) south-east of Prague.

== Demographics ==
Historical population
Year	Pop.	±%
1869	398	—
1880	441	+10.8%
1890	478	+8.4%
1900	480	+0.4%
1910	490	+2.1%
1921	430	−12.2%
1930	396	−7.9%
1950	357	−9.8%
1961	365	+2.2%
1970	346	−5.2%
1980	296	−14.5%
1991	241	−18.6%
2001	212	−12.0%
2011	229	+8.0%
2021	237	+3.5%
Source: Censuses
