= Carolin =

Carolin is a given name. Notable people with the name include:

== Given name ==
- Carolin Babcock (1912–1987), female tennis player from the United States
- Carolin Bachmann (born 1988), German politician
- Carolin Fortenbacher (born 1963), German Musical actress and singer
- Carolin Hingst (born 1980), German pole vaulter
- Carolin Leonhardt (born 1984), German sprint canoeist who competed in the 2000s
- Carolin Schiewe (born 1988), German football midfielder
- Carolin Schnarre (born 1992), German Paralympic equestrian

== Surname ==
- Heather Carolin (born 1982), American model and actress
- Paddy Carolin (1881–1967), South African rugby union player
- Reid Carolin, American film producer, director and screenwriter
- Roger Charles Carolin (1929–2025), Australian botanist

== See also ==
- Carolijn
