= Kalli =

Kalli may refer to:

== People ==
- Kalli (name), including a list of people with the surname and given name
- Karl-Heinz Feldkamp (b. 1934), German retired football manager, known as Kalli

== Places ==
- Kalli, Pärnu County, Estonia
- Kalli, Saare County, Estonia
- Lake Kalli, in Estonia
- Kalli station, in Pyongyang, North Korea
- Kalli Station (pastoral lease), a cattle and sheep station in Western Australia

== See also ==
- Kalai (disambiguation)
- Kalali (disambiguation)
- Kali (disambiguation)
- Kall (disambiguation)
- Kallio (disambiguation)
- Karli (disambiguation)
- Kali, a Hindu goddess
