= Kalali =

Kalali may refer to:

== Places ==
- Kalali, Pakpattan, Kalali village, Pakpattan city, Punjab Pakistan
- Kalali, Vadodara, Kalali village, Vadodara city, Gujarat India
- Ghukasavan, Armenia
- Noraber, Armenia
- Kalali, Iran
- Kalaleh-ye Sofla, Iran

== Other ==
- Kalali people, an indigenous Australian people
- Amirteymour Kalali (1895–1988), Iranian politician and noble
