= Kallio (surname) =

Kallio is a Finnish surname. Notable people with the surname include:

- Albert Kallio (1884–1945), Finnish politician
- Angelika Kallio (born 1972), Finnish model
- Elin Kallio (1859–1927), Finnish gymnast
- Gus Kallio (born in the 1880s), Finnish-born professional wrestler
- Hemmo Kallio (1863–1940), Finnish actor
- Ile Kallio (born 1955), Finnish guitarist and singer
- Jamie Kallio (born 1965), Canadian biathlete
- Kalervo Kallio (1909–1969), Finnish sculptor
- Karoliina Kallio (born 1979), Finnish singer
- Katja Kallio (born 1968), Finnish novelist, journalist, columnist and screenwriter
- Kyösti Kallio (1873–1940), fourth President of Finland
- Lia Kallio (born 2007), Finnish rhythmic gymnast
- Maria Kallio, a fictional Finnish police officer in the novel series Maria Kallio by Leena Lehtolainen
- Matthew Kallio (born 1986), Canadian basketball referee
- Mika Kallio (born 1982), Finnish motorcycle racer
- Rudy Kallio (1892–1979), American baseball player
- Tomi Kallio (born 1977), Finnish ice hockey player
- Toni Kallio (born 1978), Finnish footballer
- Väinö Kallio (1897–1938), Finland politician
- Varma Kallio (1920–2003), Finnish politician

== See also ==
- Kallio (disambiguation)
- Kalli (name)
