= Kalli (name) =

Kalli is a German and Old Norse masculine given name that is a diminutive form of Karl. Notable people with this name include the following:

== Given name ==
- Kalli Bjarni (born 1976), Icelandic singer
- Kalli Dakos, Canadian children's poet
- Kalli Kalde (born 1967), Estonian painter, graphic artist and illustrator

== Surname ==
- Eeva Kalli (born 1981), Finnish politician
- Leszli Kálli, Colombian kidnap victim
- Timo Kalli (born 1947), Finnish politician

== See also ==
- Kalli (disambiguation)
- Kali (name)
- Kalla (name)
- Kalle
- Kallio (surname)
- Kallu (name)
- Karli (name)
