= Nayakas of Keladi =

Ruling dynasty in Karnataka, India (1499–1763)

Keladi Nayaka Kingdom
- 1499–1763
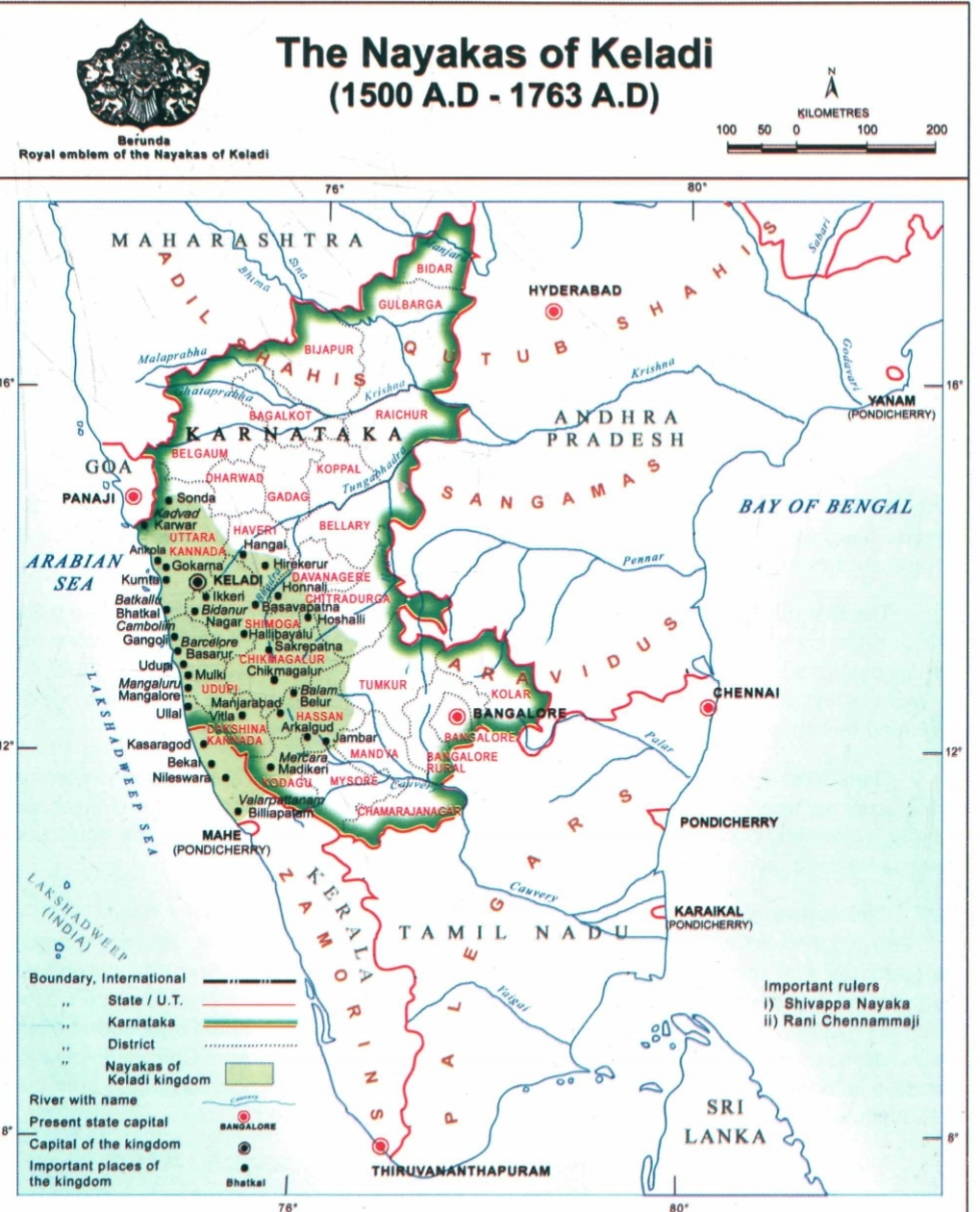
- Greatest Extent Of Keladi Kingdom during the reign of Shivappa Nayaka.
- Status: Kingdom (Subordinate to Vijayanagara Empire until 1565). Independent Kingdom till 1763 A.D.
- Capital: Keladi, Ikkeri, Bidanur
- Official languages: Kannada
- Religion: Hinduism
- Government: Monarchy
- Raja
  - 1499–1530: Chowdappa Nayaka
  - 1757–1763: Queen Veerammaji
- Historical era: Post-medieval
  - Established: 1499
  - Disestablished: 1763
Preceded by	Succeeded by
Vijayanagara Empire	Kingdom of Mysore; Haleri Kingdom
- Today part of: India

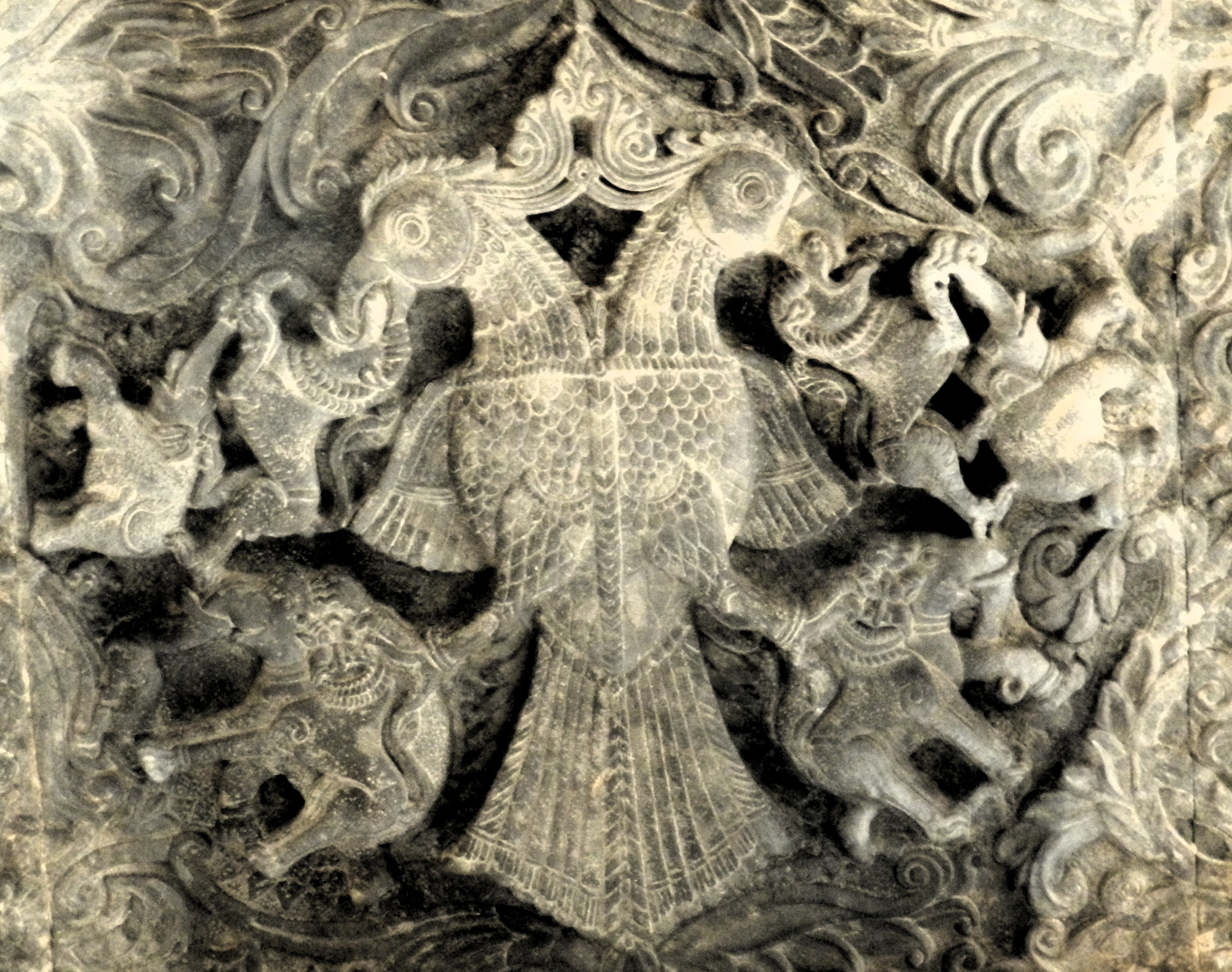
Gandaberunda sculpted on roof, Rameshwara temple, Keladi

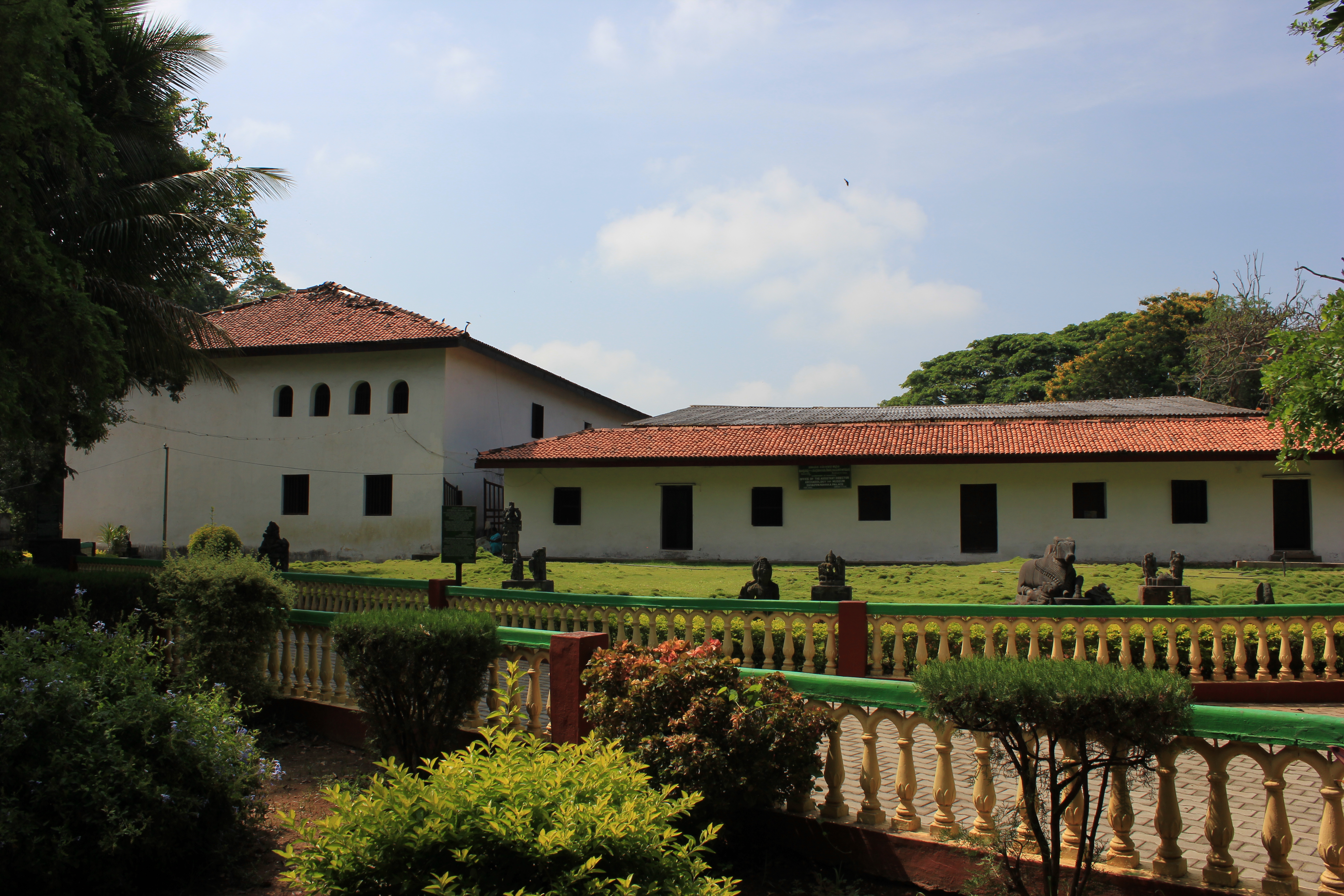
Shivappa Nayaka's palace, Shivamogga, Karnataka

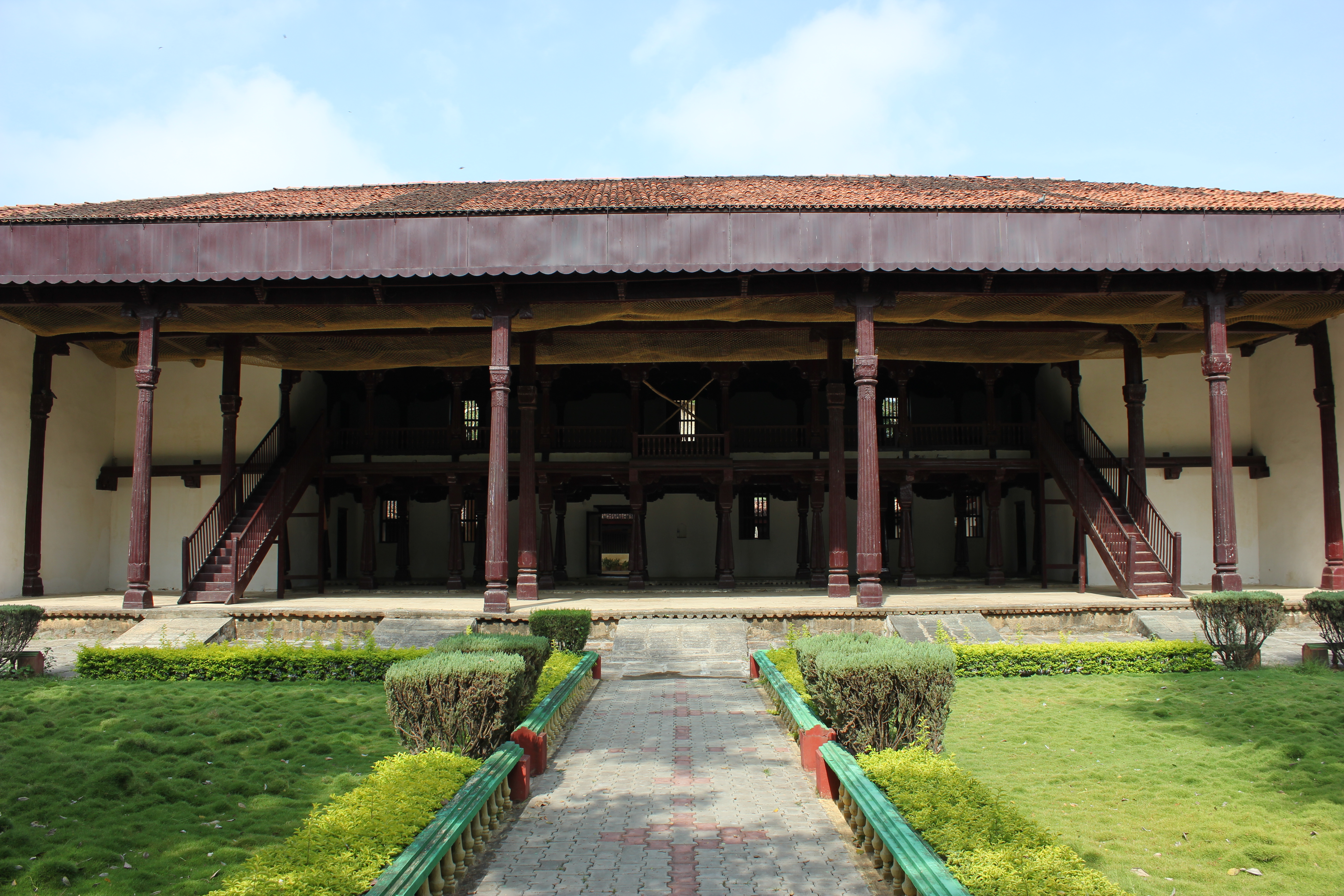
Front view of darbar hall of the Shivappa Nayaka palace

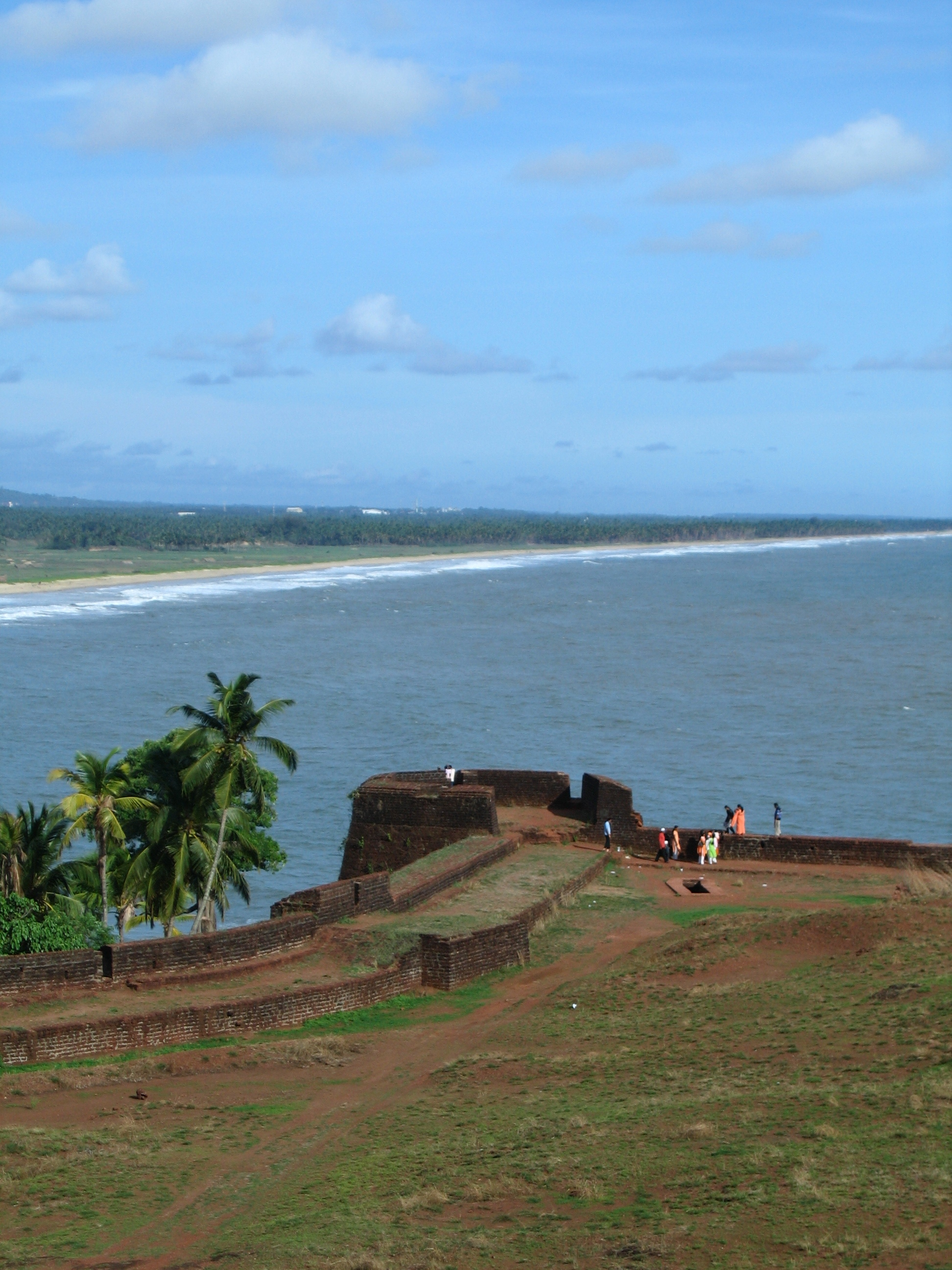
The famous Bekal Fort at Kasargod in Kerala, was built by Shivappa Nayaka

Nayakas of Keladi (Kannada: [keɭɐd̪i naːjɐkɐru]) (1499–1763), also known as Nayakas of Bednore (Kannada: [bid̪ɐnuːru naːjɐkɐru]) and Ikkeri Nayakas (Kannada: [ikːeːri naːjɐkɐru]), were an Indian dynasty based in Keladi in present-day Shimoga district of Karnataka, India. They were an important ruling dynasty in post-medieval Karnataka. They initially ruled as a vassal of the famous Vijayanagar Empire. After the fall of the empire in 1565, they gained independence and ruled significant parts of Malnad region of the Western Ghats in present-day Karnataka, most areas in the coastal regions of Karnataka and the central plains along the Tungabhadra River. In 1763 AD, with their defeat to Hyder Ali, they were absorbed into the Kingdom of Mysore. They played an important part in the history of Karnataka, during a time of confusion and fragmentation that generally prevailed in South India after the fall of the Vijayanagar Empire. The Keladi rulers were of the Vokkaliga and Banajiga castes and were Veerashaivas by faith. The Haleri Kingdom that ruled over Coorg between 1600 A.D and 1834 A.D. was founded by a member of the Keladi family.

== Nayaka clan ==
Bachanna Nayaka, Halepaika Palegara of Chandragutti Fort, ruled 400 villages including Shivamogga. Later, the Nayakas of Keladi conquered Chandragutti.

Chaudappa Nayaka, originally Chauda Gowda, (1499–1530), was from a village called Pallibailu near Keladi. He was the son of couple Basavappa and Basavamambe, who were into farming. He was the earliest chieftain to rule the area surrounding Shimoga, rose through self capability and acumen and was a feudatory of Vijayanagara Empire.

Sadashiva Nayaka (1530–1566) was an important chieftain in the Vijayanagar Empire and earned the title Kotekolahala from emperor Aliya Rama Raya for his heroics in the battle of Kalyani. The coastal provinces of Karnataka came under his direct rule. He moved the capital to Ikkeri some 20 km. from Keladi.

Dodda Sankanna Nayaka (1566–1570), is most famous for his conflict with the Sultanate of Bijapur. According to the Sivatattva Ratnakara, he defeated the Bijapur general Randaula Khan. His reign ended abruptly when he decided to abdicate the throne to lead a life of a religious mendicant (Jangama) and went on a pilgrimage to holy sites across India.

Chikka Sankanna Nayaka (r. 1570–1580) and Rama Raja Nayaka (r. 1570–1582) Historical inscriptions and scholarly consensus indicate that the brothers Chikka Sankanna and Rama Raja initially ruled as co-regents. They expanded the kingdom to protect the Malnad and coastal regions from the crumbling authority of the Aravidu dynasty at Penukonda and the encroaching Adil Shahis of Bijapur.

Chikka Sankanna is noted for defeating the forces of the Vijayanagara loyalist Vitthala Raya, while Rama Raja focused on securing the northern frontiers and successfully repelled multiple incursions by the Adil Shahi generals who were attempting to seize the forts of Sirsi and Banavasi. Their joint administration solidified the kingdom's borders in the Uttara Kannada district, turning Keladi into the dominant power of the Kanara coast.

Hiriya Venkatappa Nayaka (1582–1629) is considered by historians as the greatest monarch of the dynasty, Hiriya Venkatappa Nayaka ascended the throne in 1582. He systematically dismantled the remaining vestiges of Vijayanagara suzerainty, refusing to pay tribute to the Penukonda rulers by 1613 and declaring total independence.

His reign was marked by significant military and diplomatic achievements:

- Defeat of the Portuguese: He defeated the Portuguese in 1618 and 1619, forcing them to negotiate trade terms for pepper and rice on his own terms.
- Expansion: He expanded the kingdom to include the entire coastal belt and large portions of the eastern Western Ghats, famously defeating the Adil Shahis at Hanagal.
- Religious Pluralism: Though a devout Virashaiva (Lingayat), he provided land grants and protection to Vaishnavas, Jains, and Muslims, famously patronizing the Sringeri Sharada Peetham.
- European Accounts: The Italian traveler Pietro Della Valle, who visited the capital at Ikkeri in 1623, described him as a disciplined soldier and a highly capable administrator.

Virabhadra Nayaka (1629–1645) faced many troubles from the start, including competition from rival Jain chieftains of Malenad for the throne of Ikkeri and invasion by the Sultanate armies of Bijapur. Ikkeri was plundered by the Bijapur army during his time.

Shivappa Nayaka (1645–1660) is widely considered as the ablest and greatest of the Keladi rulers. He was the uncle of Virabhadra Nayaka. Shivappa deposed his nephew to gain the throne of Keladi. He was not only an able administrator; he also patronised literature and fine arts. His successful campaigns against the Bijapur sultans, the Mysore kings, the Portuguese, and other Nayakas of the neighbouring territories east of the Western Ghats helped expand the kingdom to its greatest extent, covering large areas of present-day Karnataka. He gave importance to agriculture and developed new schemes for collection of taxes and revenues which earned him much praise from later British officials. A statue of him and the palace built by him containing many artifacts of his times are reminders of the respect he has earned even from the present generation of people of the region. He destroyed the Portuguese political power in the Kanara region by capturing all the Portuguese forts of the coastal region.

Chikka Venkatappa Nayaka (1660–1662), ruled for a short span of time after Shivappa Nayaka.

Bhadrappa Nayaka (1662–1664), succeeded Chikka Venkatappa Nayaka. During his reign the rule of Vokkaligas came to an end and was replaced by the rule of Banajigas.

Somashekara Nayaka I (1664–1672) The King who was once a good administrator, gave up his interest in administration after his association with a dancer named Kalavati. Bharame Mavuta, a relative of Kalavati slow poisoned the king which eventually led to his death.

Keladi Chennamma (1672–1697) She was an able ruler who some scholars claim was allied with the Maratha Shivaji and later his son Sambhaji to defeat all rival claimants to the throne. She gave shelter to Chhatrapathi Rajaram when he fled from the Mughal army. Chennamma of Keladi is well remembered by local people through tales of her bravery.

Basavappa Nayaka (1697–1714) He was a brave ruler and the adopted son of Rani Chennammaji from their relative Markappa Shetty of Bedanur. He was a polymath and the author of Sivatattva Ratnakara, a Sanskrit encyclopedia covering a range of subjects including History, Geography, Science and Arts and Governance.

Somashekara Nayaka II (1714–1739) His reign was marked by persistent conflicts with the Nayakas of Chitradurga and the Marathas. Despite these external pressures, he maintained the integrity of the Keladi territories in the Malnad and Kanara regions. He is noted for his patronage of religious institutions and for continuing the administrative traditions established by his predecessors. During his rule, the capital Bidanur remained a significant center of trade and culture in South India.

Kiriya Basavappa Nayaka (1739–1754) His reign coincided with the rising power of the Kingdom of Mysore and the increasing interference of the Marathas in the Karnataka region. He focused on strengthening the fortifications of Bidanur and managing the strategic pepper trade with European powers. However, the internal factionalism within the Keladi court began to weaken the state's central authority during the latter half of his rule.

Chenna Basappa Nayaka (1754–1757) was the adopted son of Kiriya Basavappa Nayaka. His brief reign was dominated by the regency of his adoptive mother, Virammaji. This period was marked by intense political instability and court conspiracies. The weakness of his administration eventually paved the way for the invasion of Hyder Ali of Mysore, who annexed the Keladi Kingdom in 1763, shortly after Chenna Basappa's reign and the subsequent rule of Virammaji.

Queen Virammaji (1757–1763) was defeated by Hyder Ali who merged the Keladi kingdom with the Kingdom of Mysore. The queen was captured by Hyder Ali and was kept in confinement along with her son in the fort of Madugiri. They were however rescued in 1767 when Peshwa Madhavrao I defeated Hyder Ali in the battle of Madugiri. Later, they were sent to Pune the capital of the Maratha Empire for protection. The current successor of the clan are living in Bangalore named Chaitra Arasar and Vasanth Kumar Arasar.

== Decline and end ==
For more than two hundred years the kingdom controlled the coastal and Malnad regions of present-day Karnataka and fostered a rich tradition of trade with the English, the Portuguese, and the Dutch. However, in the period of gloom brought about by the fall of the great Hindu empire, the Vijayanagar empire, constant wars—campaigns against local chieftains and the Mysore Kingdom and the harassment of the Marathas finally drained the treasury and resulted in the end of the kingdom.

== Literature ==
=== Kannada ===
- Keladinripavijayam by Linganna
- Shivagita by Tirumalabhatta

=== Sanskrit ===
- Shivatattvaratnakara by King Basavappa
- Tattva Kausthuba by Bhattoji Dikshita
- Ashvapandita by Manapriya.

== Architecture ==
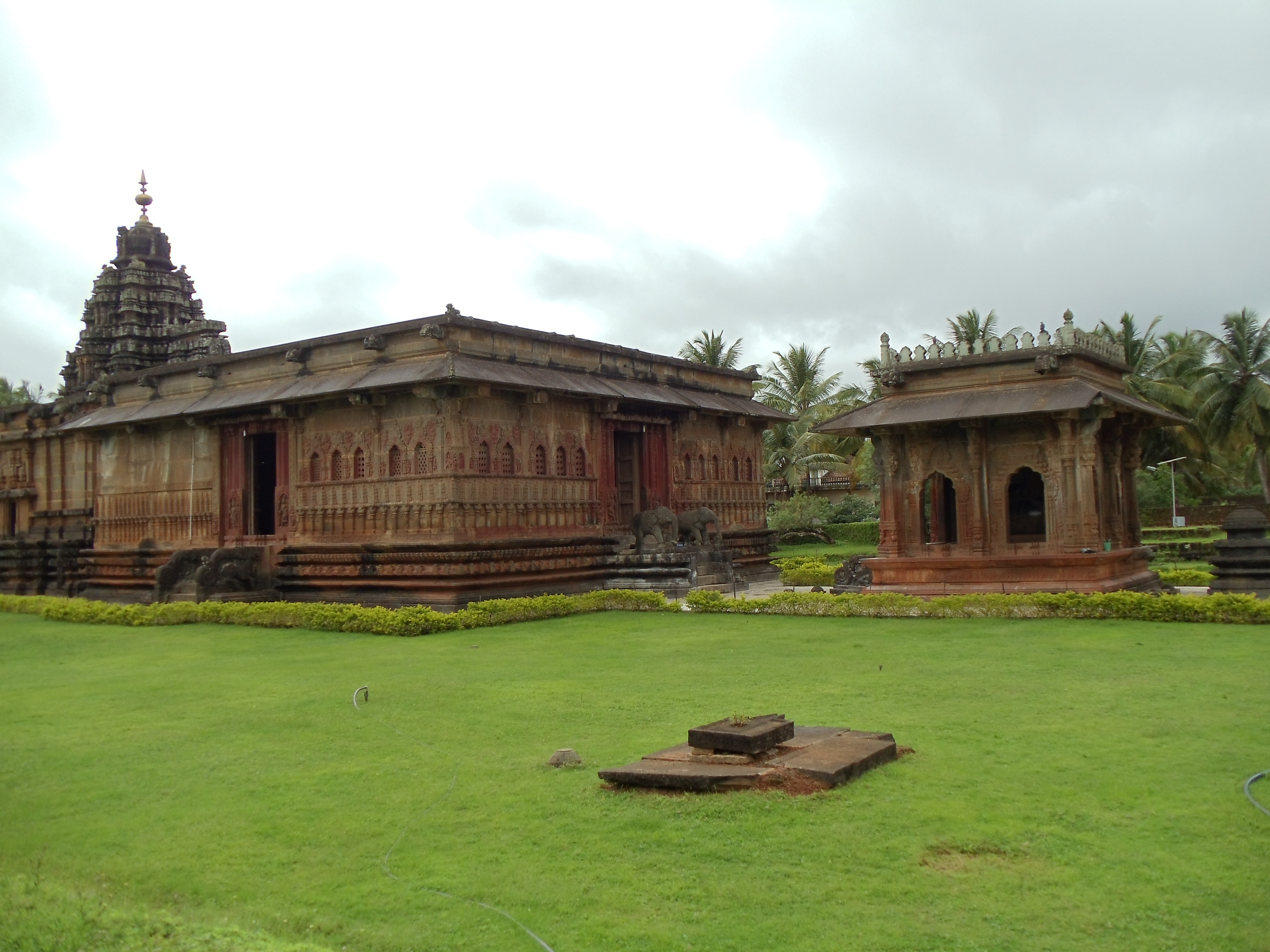
Aghoreshwara temple at Ikkeri

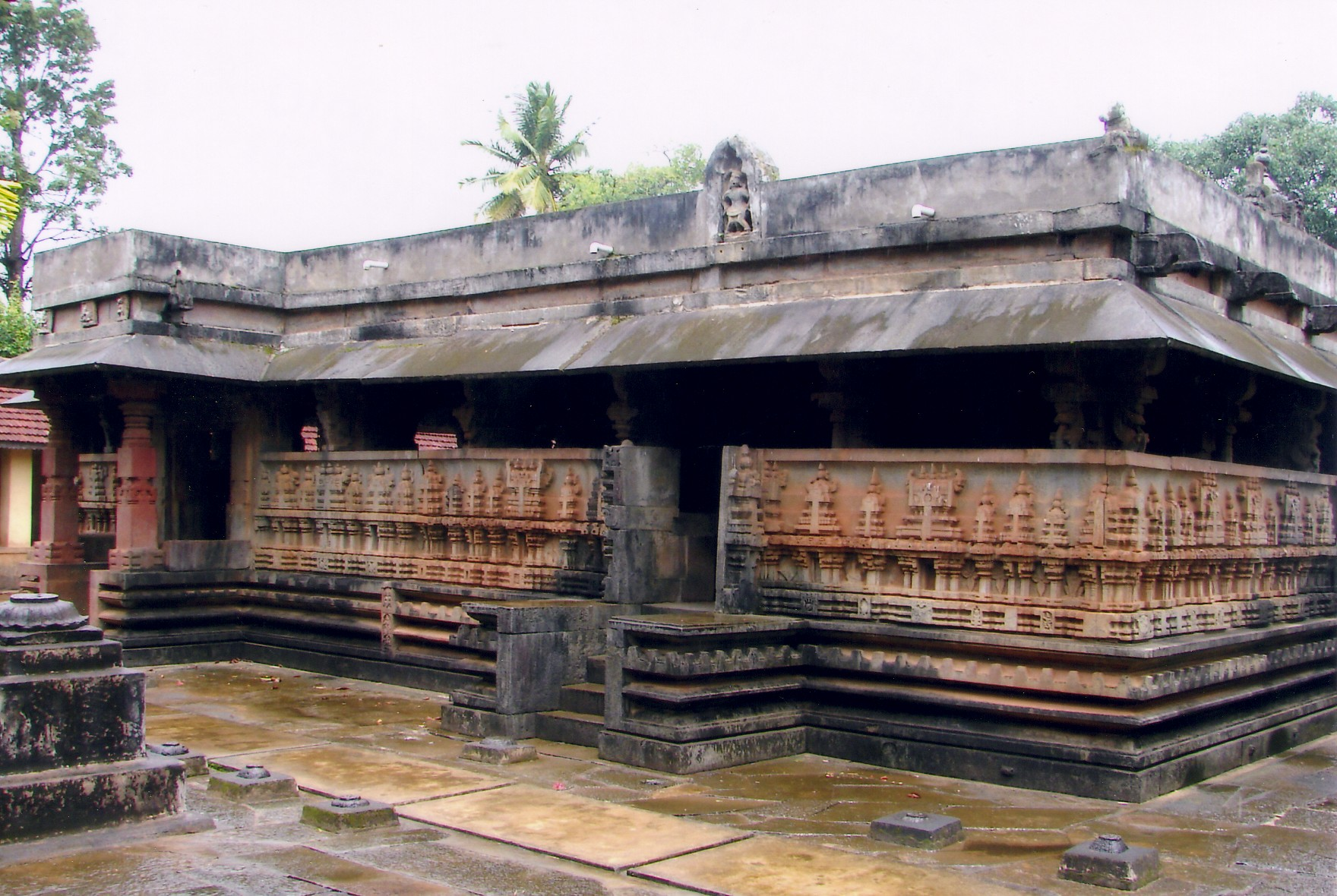
Rameshwara Temple in Keladi

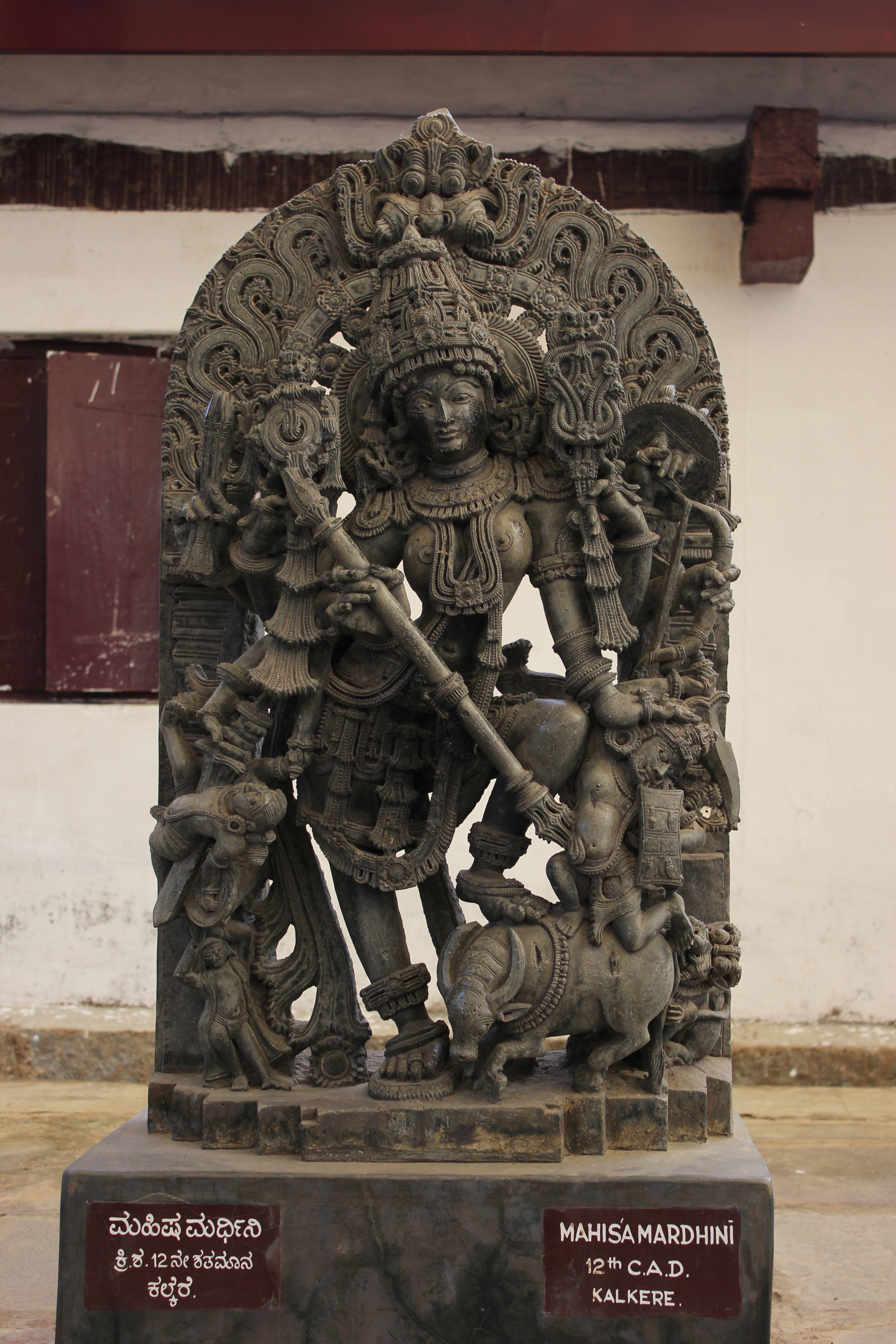
Mahisha Mardhini, a sculpture in the Shivappa Nayaka Palace and museum

The Keladi Nayakas built some fine temples in Ikkeri and Keladi using a combination of late Kadamba, Hoysala, Vijayanagar, and Dravida styles. The use of granite for their construction shows they simply followed the Vijayanagar model of architecture. The Aghoreshwara temple at Ikkeri and the Rameshwara temple at Keladi are the best examples of the Nayakas' art. Vijayanagar-style pillars with hippogryphs are common; called yali columns (depiction of horses and lions as seen in Hampi) is found here. These are pillars with lions, either with their forepaws raised or simply in a sitting position, and pillars with a mythical horse-like animal with front legs raised, balancing on its rear legs, and with an armed rider on its back which are worth seeing at Ikkeri. A roof sculpture depicting a Gandaberunda, the mythical two-headed bird of Karnataka, is found in Keladi. Also, in the Rameshwara temple, a pillar sculpture shows Maratha Rajaram I with Keladi Chennamma (history has it that Rajaram was protected by the queen when he was on the run from the Mughals).

== Religious tolerance ==
The Keladi Nayakas were Veerashaivas, patronized the religion, constructed numerous mutts and were responsible for the spread of Veerashaivism to the Malenadu and Coastal Karnataka. There were sixty four mutts in the district of Dakshina Kannada alone. Nevertheless, they were tolerant towards followers of other religions and other Hindu denominations. The Keladi Nayakas invited Kazi Mahmoud who was a grandson of chief kazi of Adil Shahi kingdom of Bijapur to settle in Bhatkal. The revenue of Tenginagundi village was given to Kazi Mahmoud. The kazi family of Bhatkal is popularly known as Temunday Family due to the ownership of lands in Tenginagundi. Many Nawayath Muslims were appointed in the administrative positions. The families of these nobles Nawayath still use their surnames as Ikkeri and are mainly settled in and around Bhatkal. The Golden Kalasa on the dome of Bhatkal Jamia Masjid popularly known as 'Chinnada Palli' meaning 'Golden Mosque' is believed to be a generous gift from Keladi rulers.

== Gallery ==
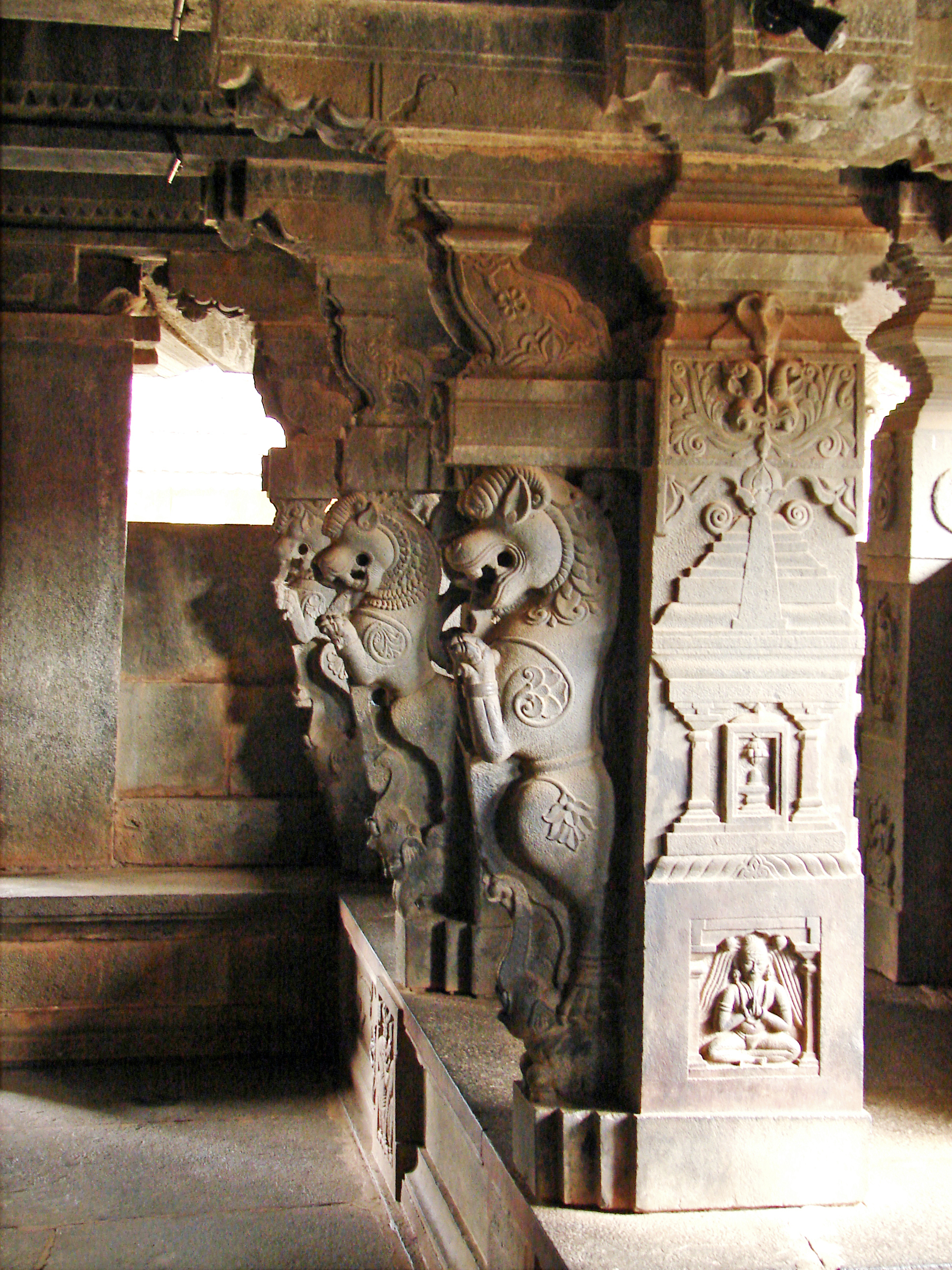
Granite yali pillars, Rameshwara Temple, Keladi, Shimoga District

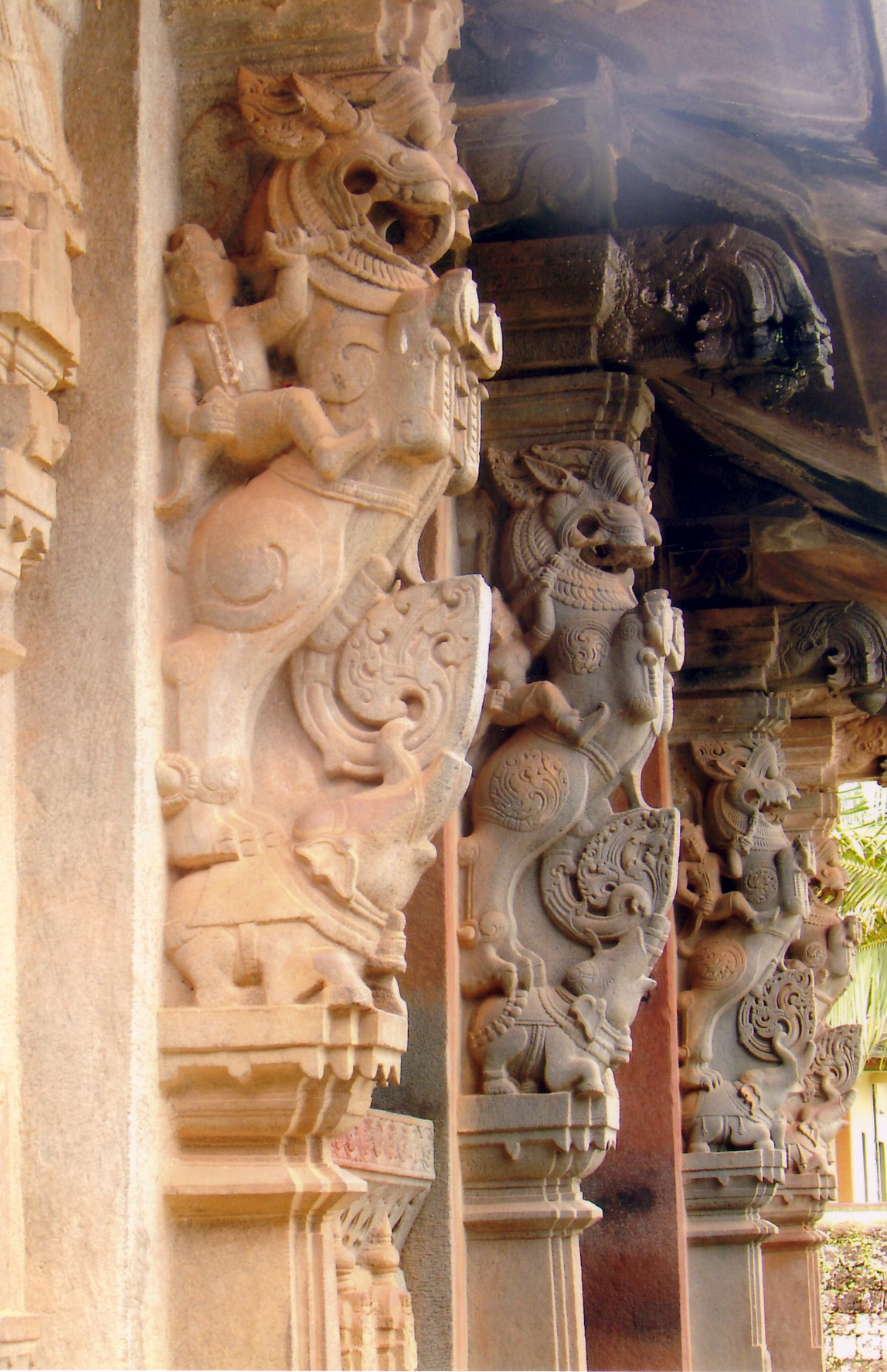
Granite yali pillars, Aghoreshwara Temple, Ikkeri, Shimoga District

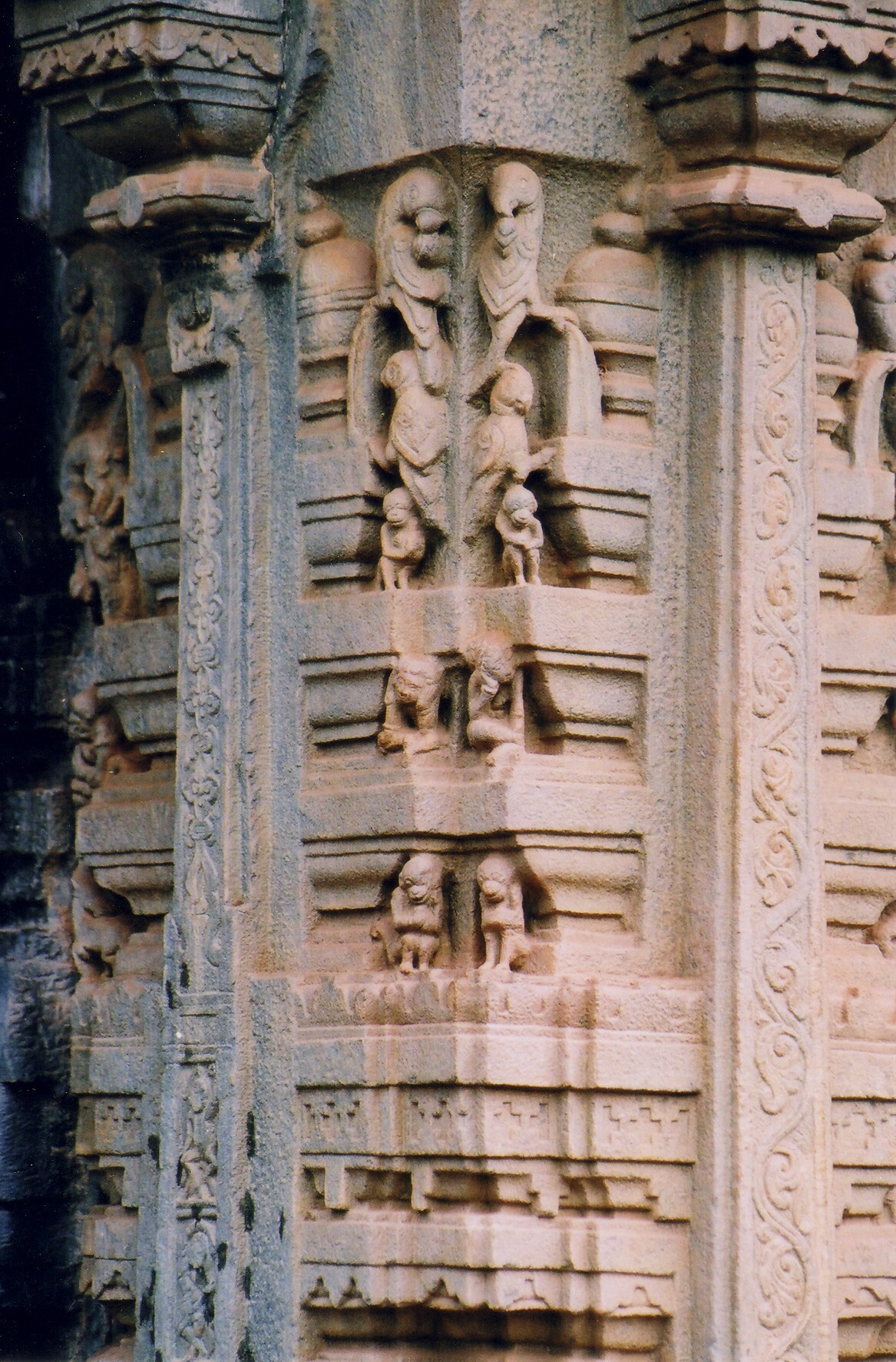
Wall motif, Rameshwara Temple, Keladi, Shimoga District

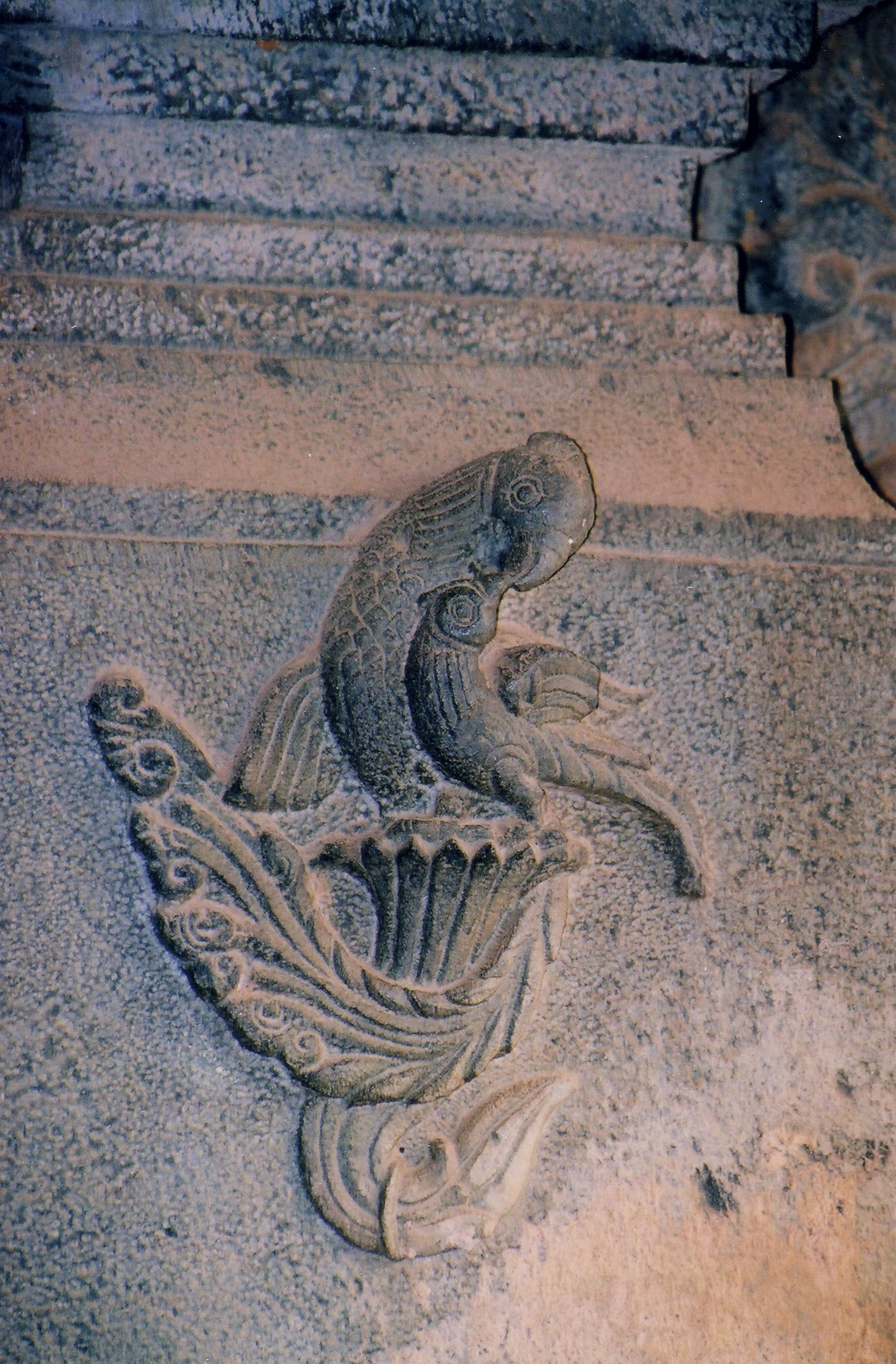
Parrot feeding nestling in frieze, Rameshwara Temple, Keladi, Shimoga District

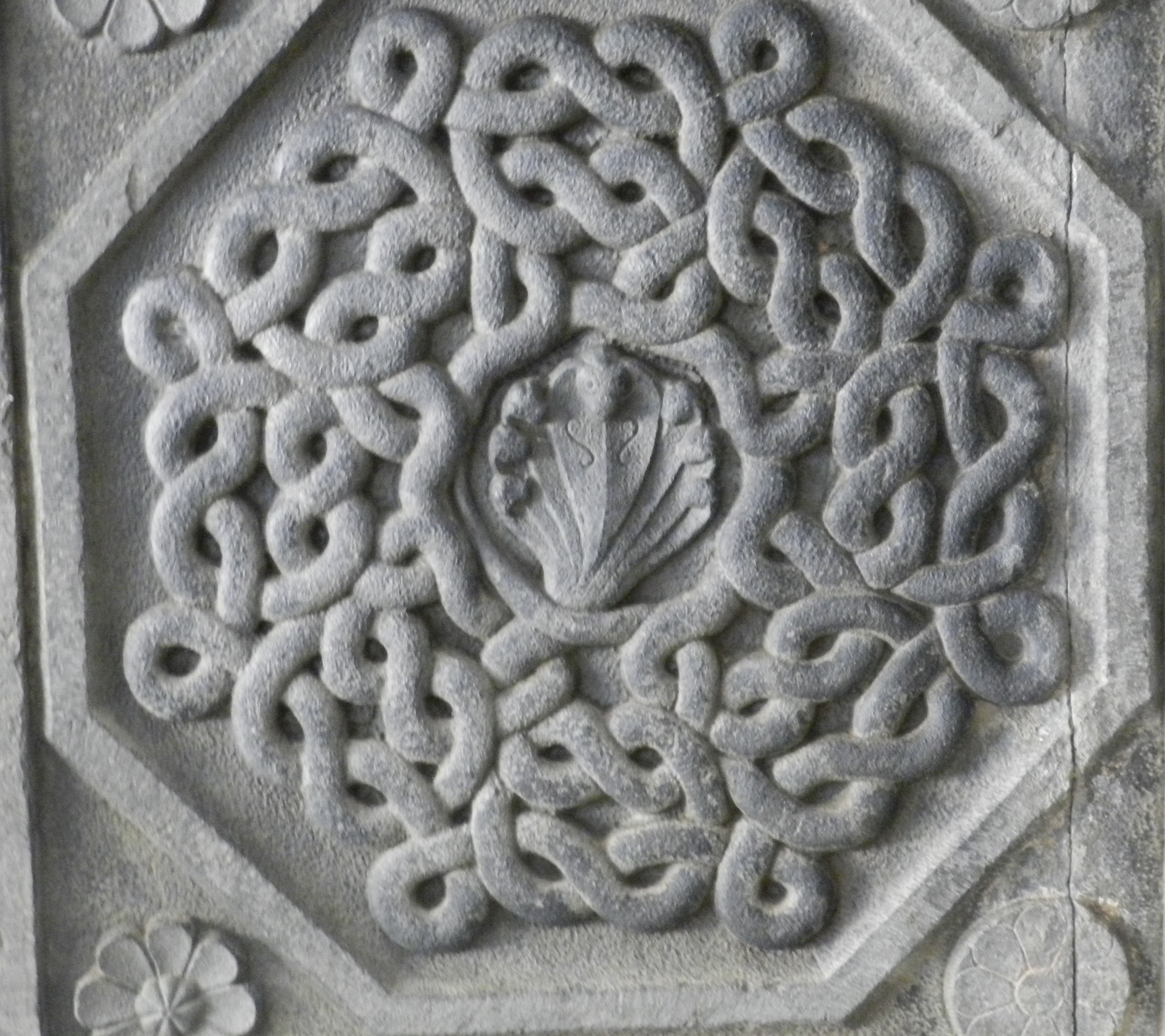
Sarpabandha, the snake chain

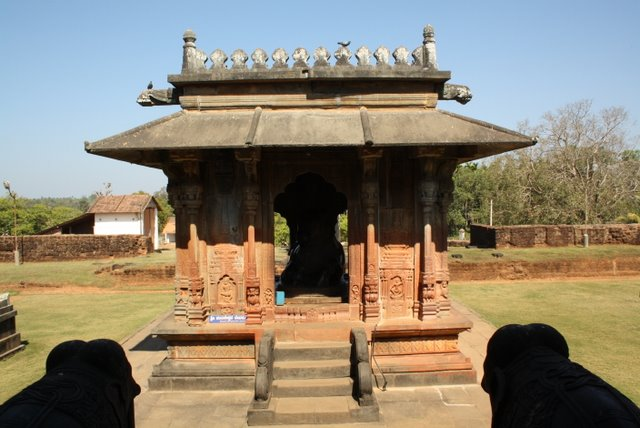
Nandi Mantapa

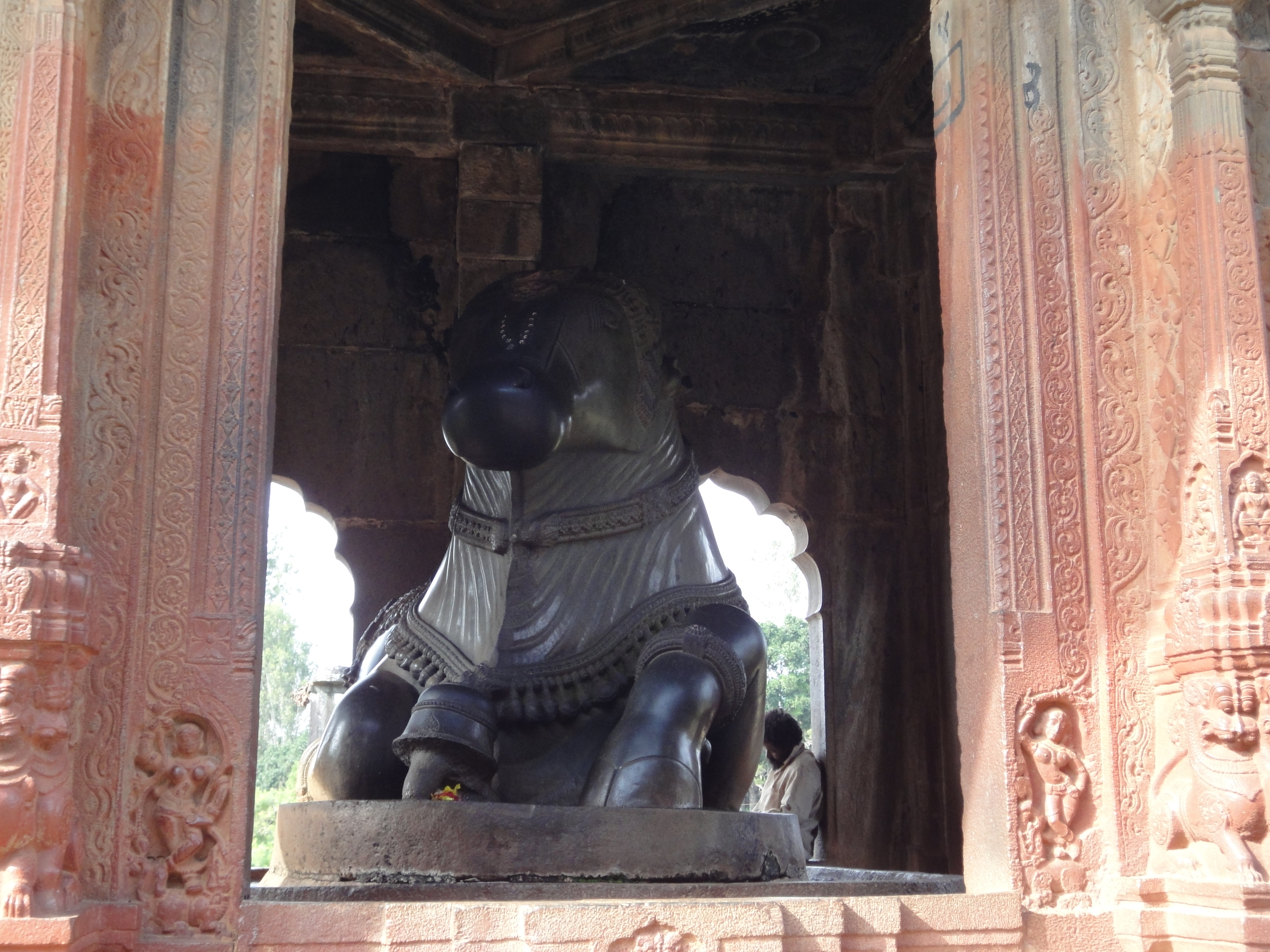
Monolith of Nandi the bull inside the Nandi mantapa

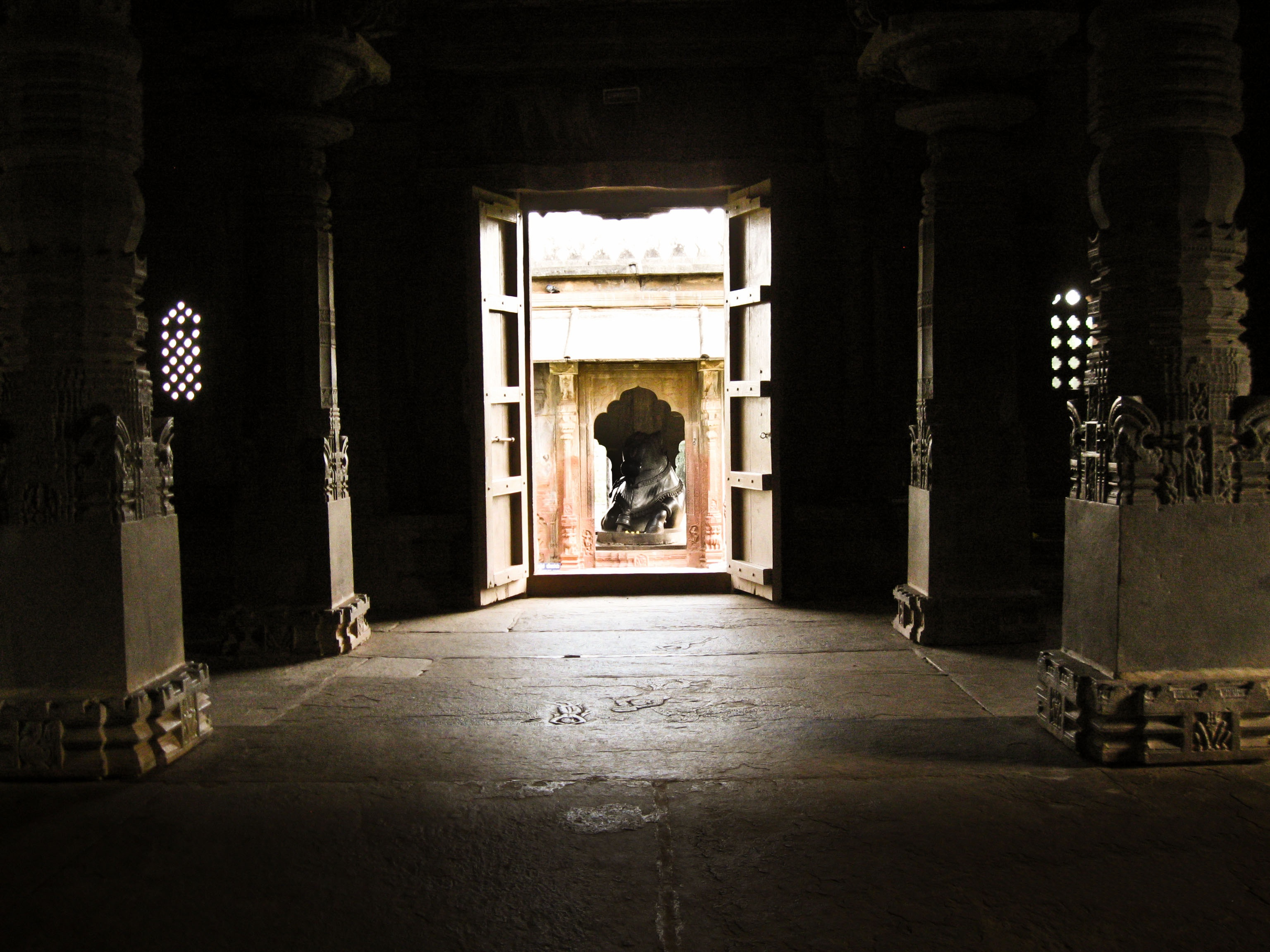
Another view of Nandi Mantapa from the closed mantapa adjoining the sanctum

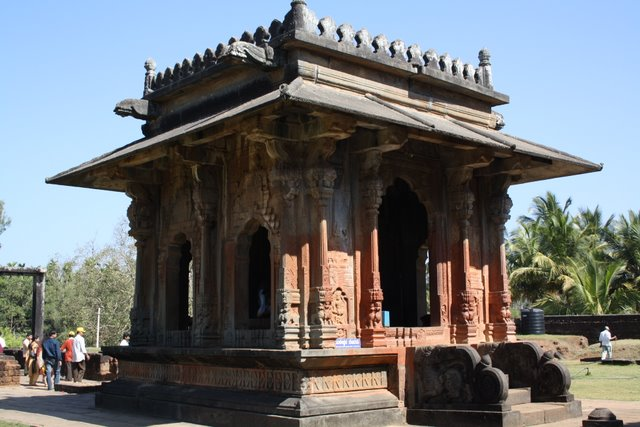
Another view of Nandi Mantapa
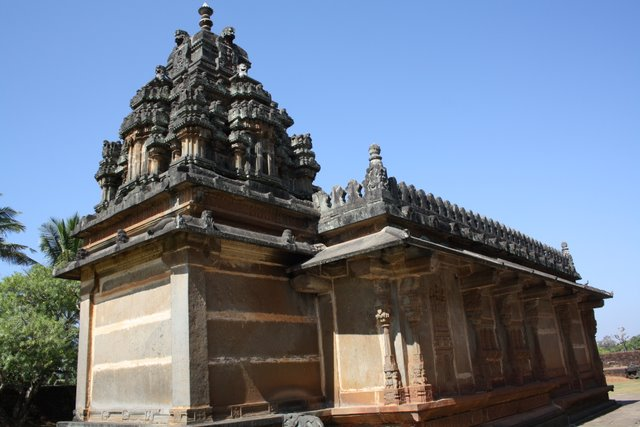
Aghoreshwara Temple

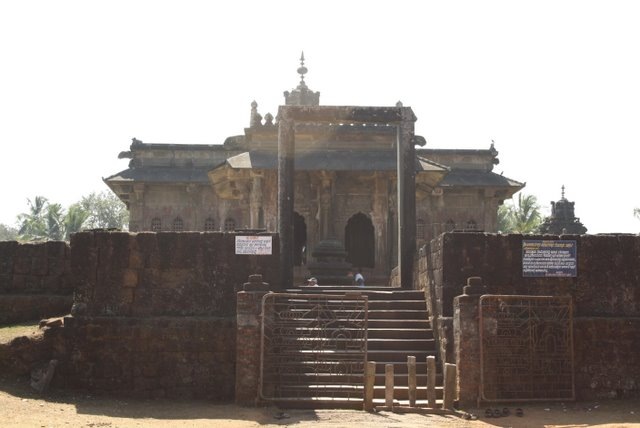
Aghoreshwara Temple

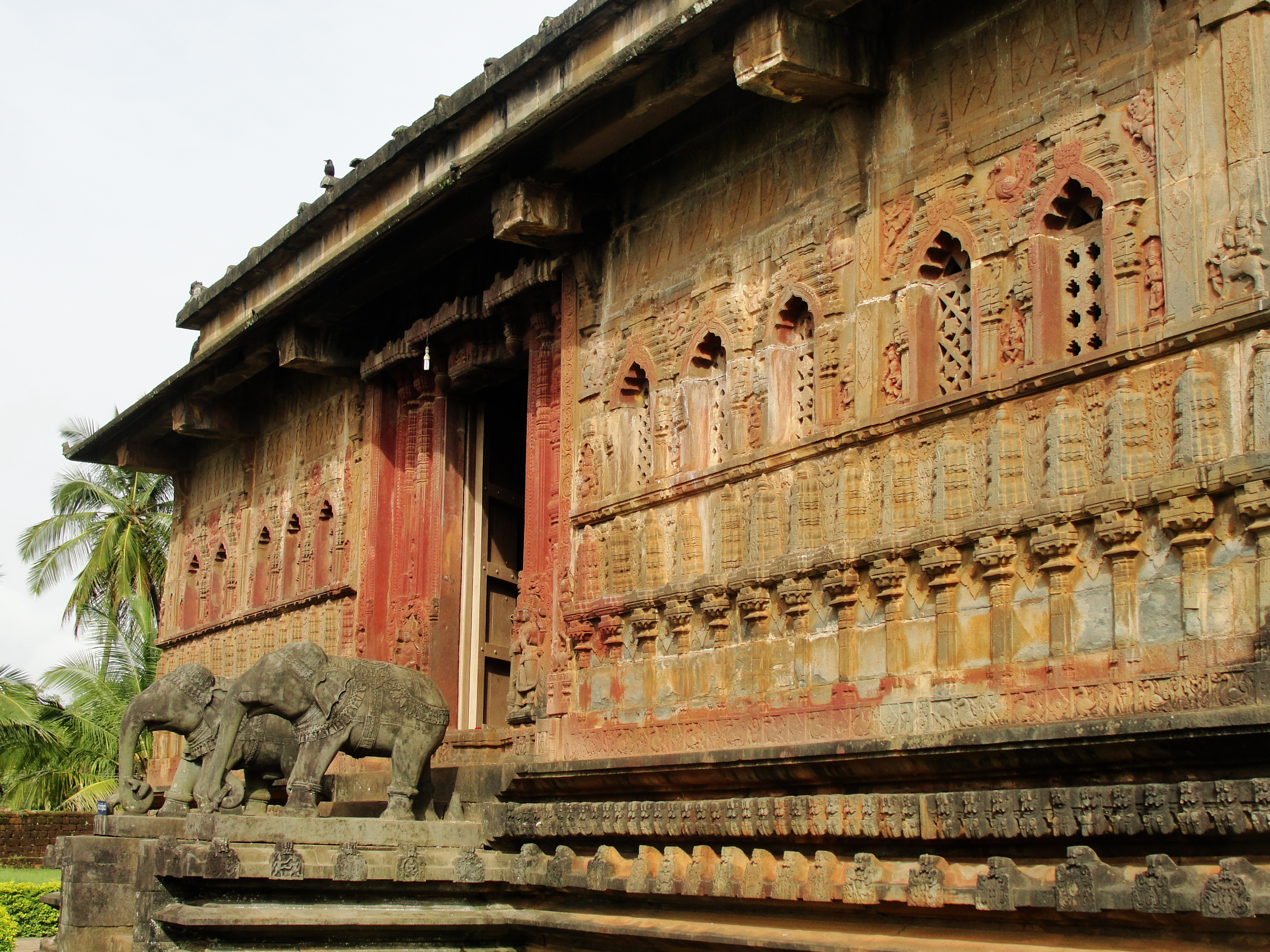
side view

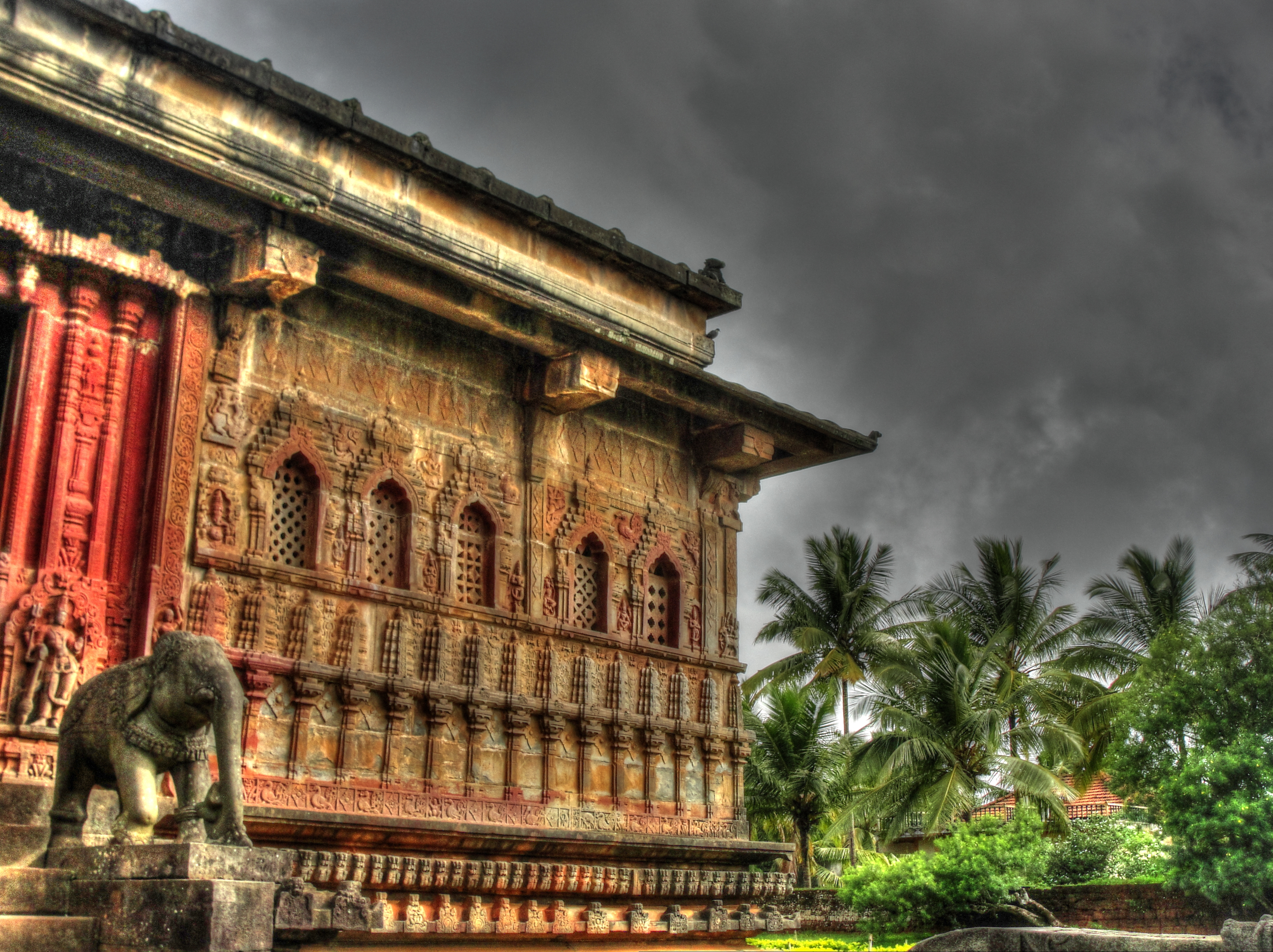
side view

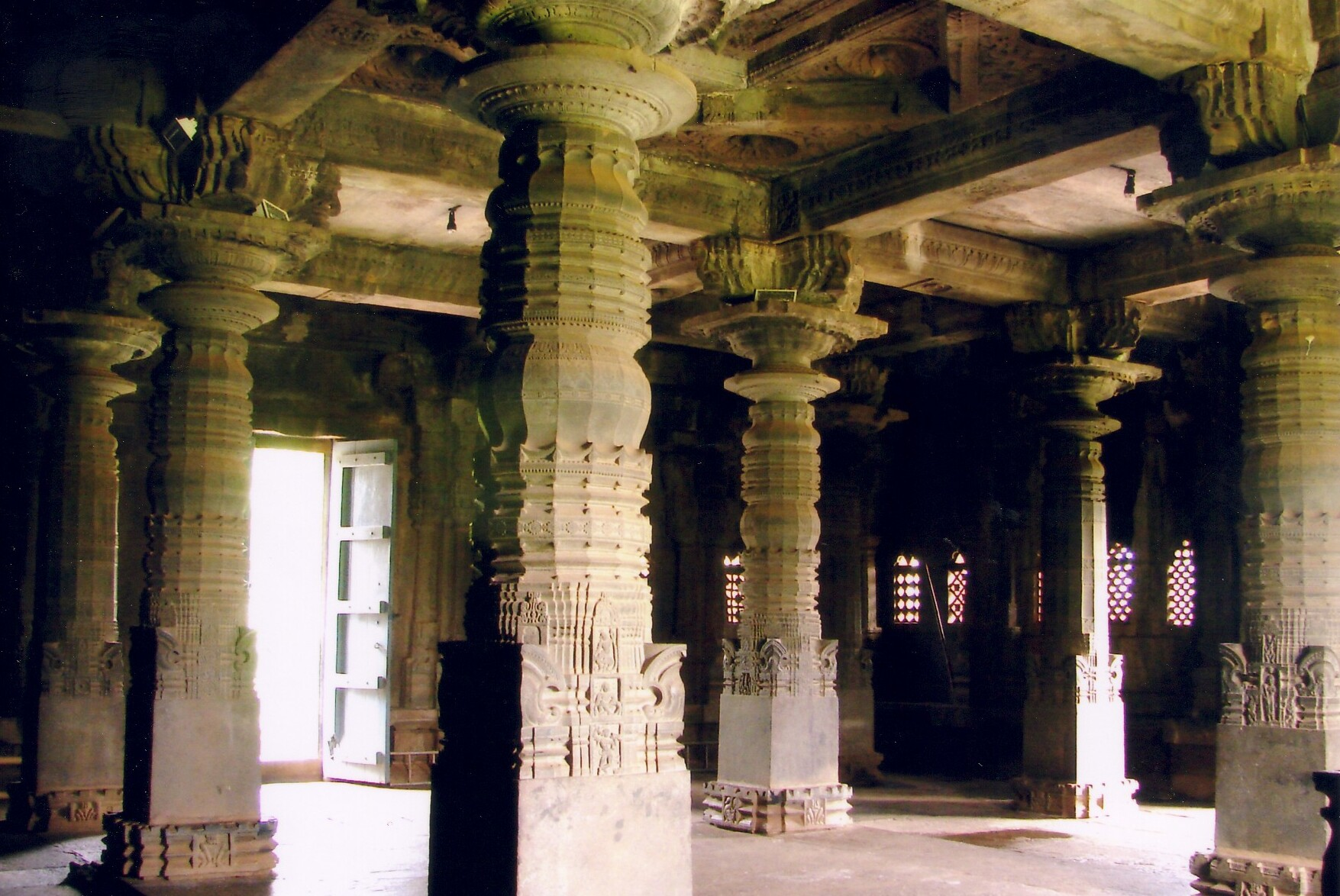
Rangamantapa, the stage for performance

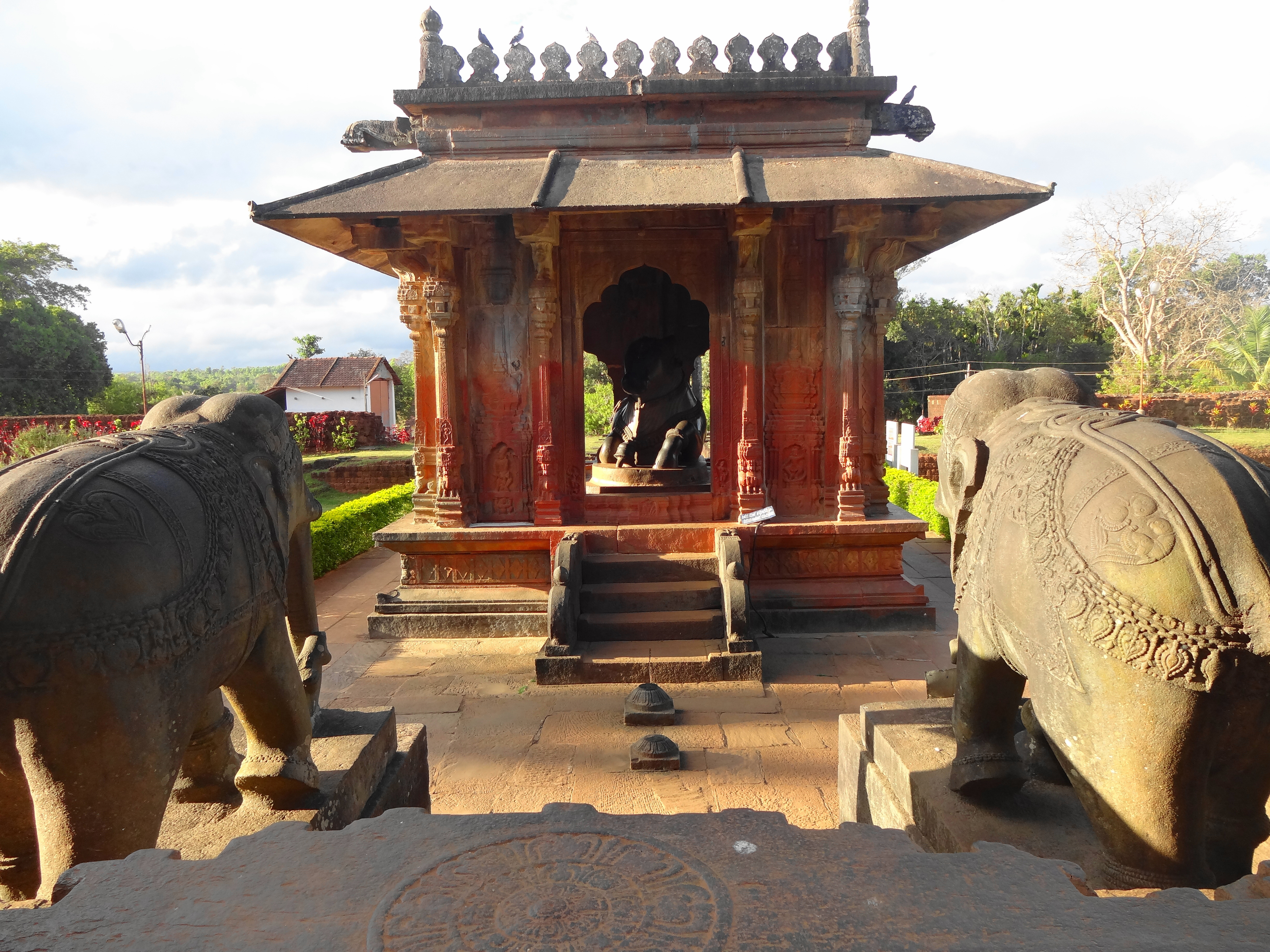
Close up view of Nandi Mantapa
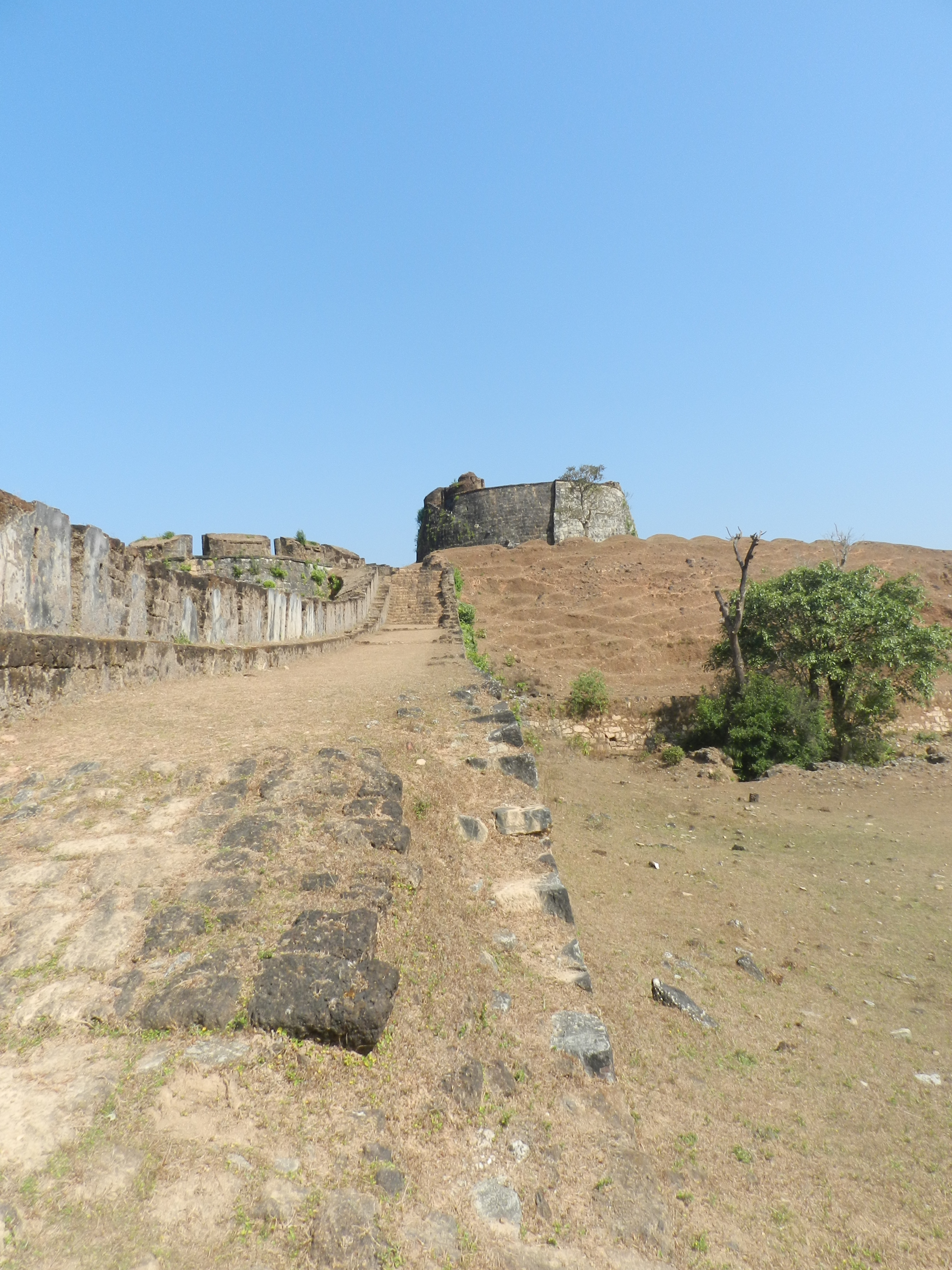
Bidanur or Bednore fort, Hosanagara

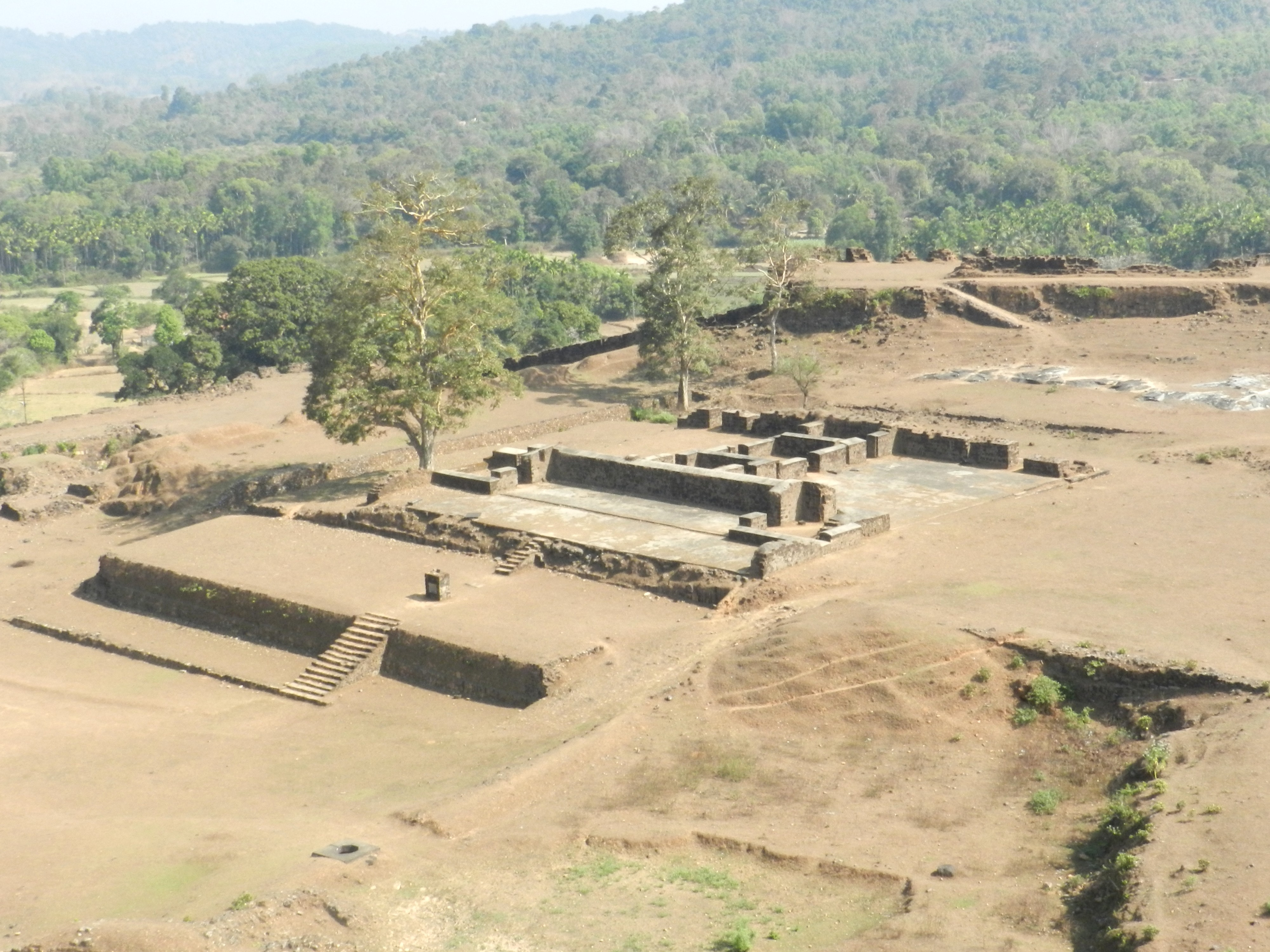
ruins of Bidanur or Bednore fort, Hosanagara

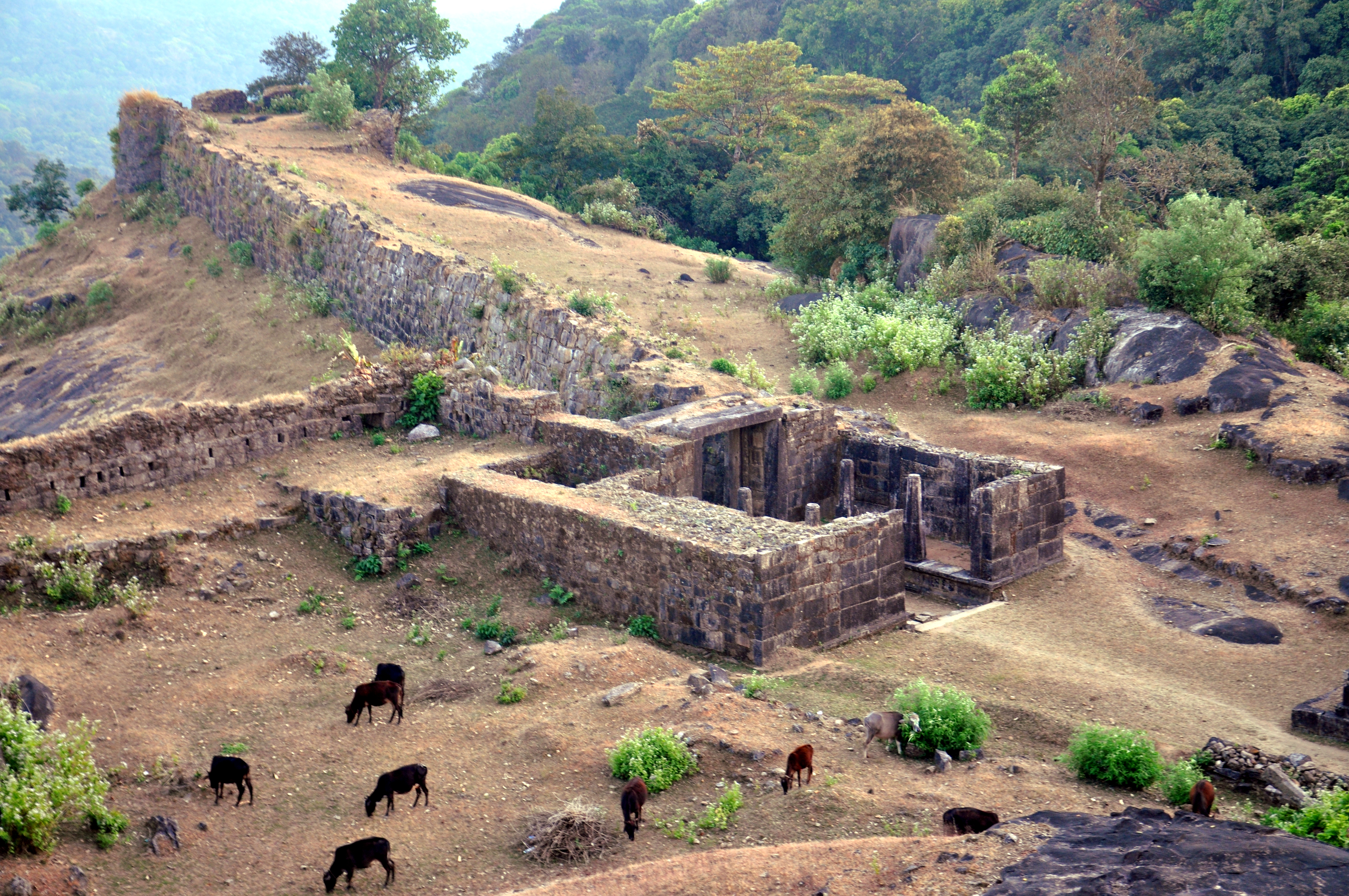
Kavaledurga fort, Kavaledurga, Thirthahalli.

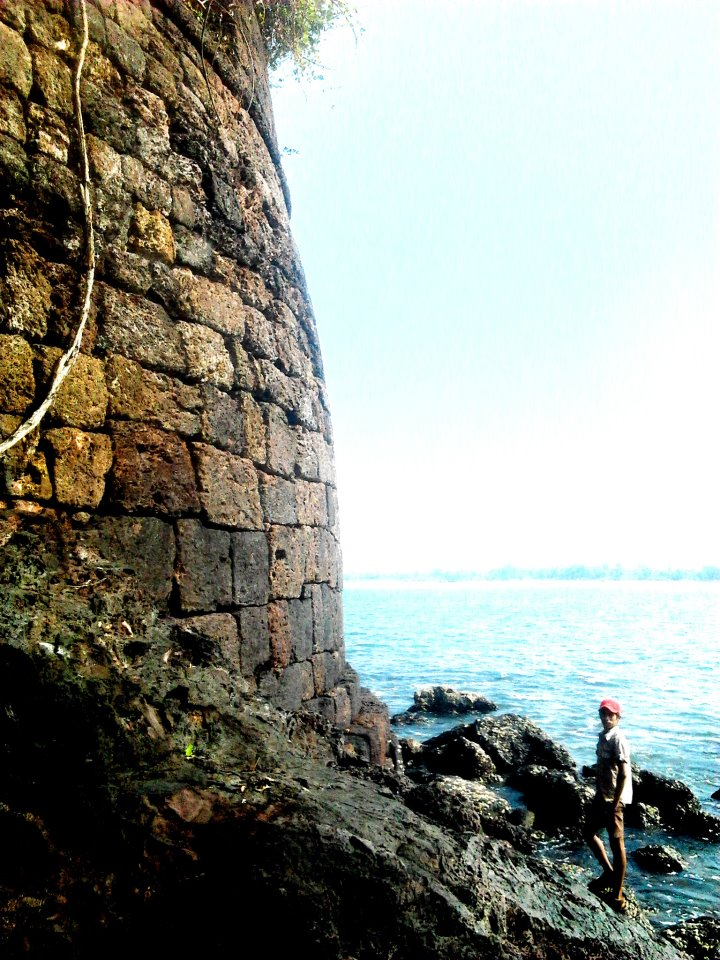
curved shape wall of the Basavaraj durga fort built by Shivappa Nayaka.

== See also ==
- History of Karnataka
- Political history of medieval Karnataka
- Sadashiva Nayaka

== Sources ==
- K.R. Venkataraman. The throne of transcendental wisdom: Śrī Śamkarācārya's Śāradā Pìtha in Śringeri, Page 58.
- Dr. Suryanath U. Kamath, A Concise history of Karnataka from pre-historic times to the present, Jupiter books, 2001, MCC, Bangalore (Reprinted 2002)
