= Kalai (process) =

Metalworking process

The art of kalai (kalhai or qalai) is the process of coating an alloy surface such as copper or brass by deposition of metal tin on it. The word "kalai" is derived from Sanskrit word kalya lepa, which means "white wash or tin". A cultural Sanskrit work by Keladi Basava called "Sivatattva Ratnakara" (1699) mentions "kalaya-lepa" in the chapter of cookery or "supashashtra" which means applying kalai on utensils. People practicing the art of kalai are called Kalaiwala or Kalaigar. Basically, Kalaigars or Kalaiwalas are community craftsmen.

== History ==
Vessels with kalai, both on its interior and exterior have been found in the excavations of Bramhapuri at Kolhapur, Maharashtra which adds to the archeological evidence of kalai art. From this evidence, P K. Gode, who studied tin coating on metallic vessels in India, stated that the history of tin coating dates back to 1300 C.E. The history of kalai is also recorded in “Parsibhashanushasana” of Vikaramasimha (before Samvat 1600 i.e. C.E. 1544) and also in the famous Ain- I -Akbari (C.E. 1590) by Abul Fazal.

== Spiritual approach ==
The copper vessels with kalai were used to store water and cook food earlier because of a spiritual belief that copper attracts and transmits a divine consciousness also called “Chaitanya”. The spiritual approach to the use of copper vessels to store water is that copper and tin have Sattva-Raja (the basic component of creation/universe) component that is transferred to water.

== Scientific approach ==
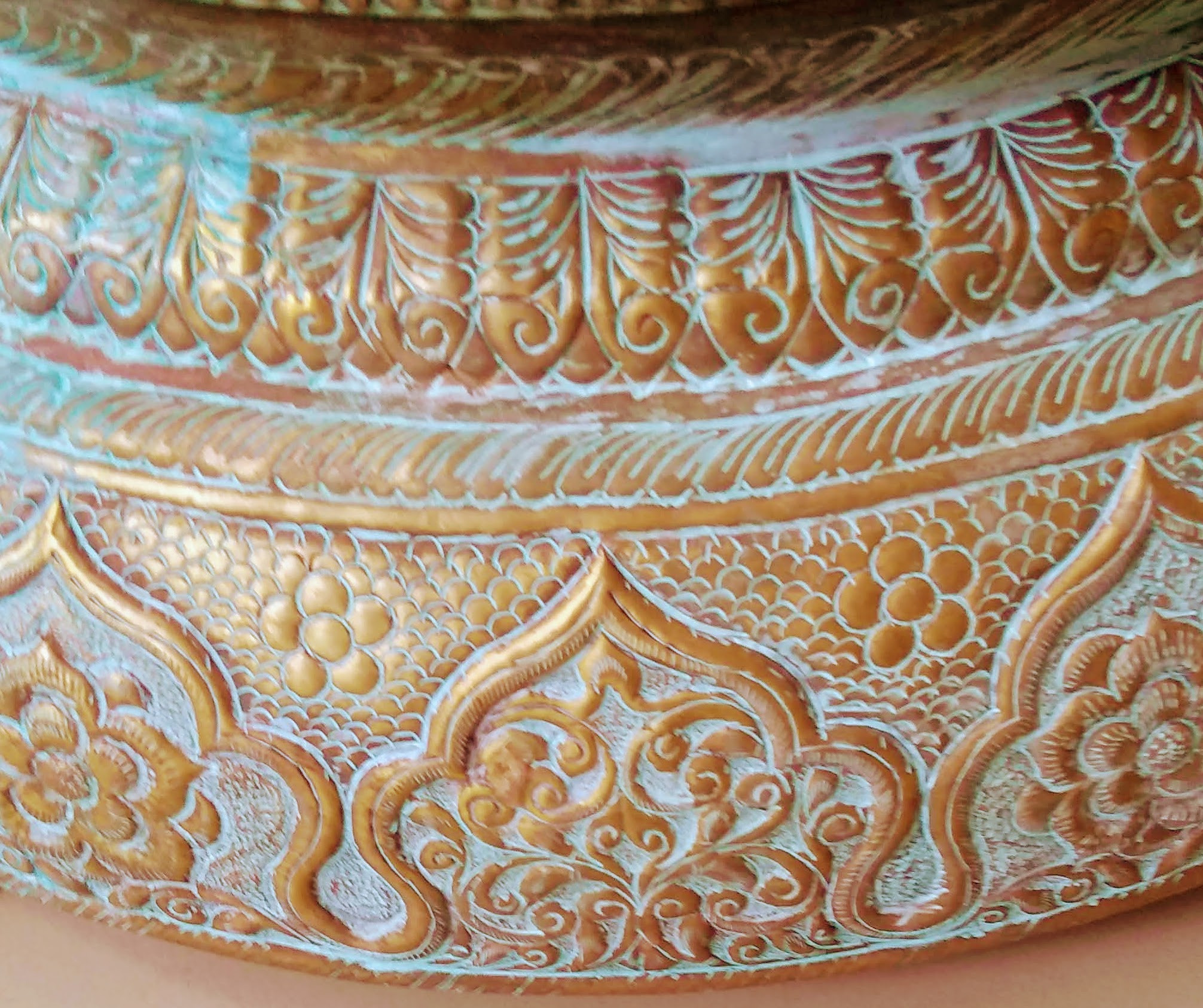
A copper object with copper carbonate on its surface

Earlier, copper and brass vessels were used because of their high conductivity. High conductivity of copper vessels reduces the fuel cost. However, a chemical reaction between copper and oxygen called oxidization turns the copper vessels black. Copper also reacts with the moisture in air and creates copper carbonate, which can be noticed as light green rust on the surface. Copper carbonate is poisonous and can make a person severely ill if it gets mixed with food. The copper can get dissolved in water in trace amounts when the water is stored in copper vessels for a long period of time. The process is known as the “oligodynamic effect”. Kalai protects from food poisoning and blackening of copper vessels by preventing direct contact of air with the copper or brass surface. Tin is also a good conductor of heat like copper, hence applying kalai does not result in loss of heat conductivity for the utensil.

The kalai is required to be done on the vessels approximately every two months. Tin will melt if the temperature is above 425 degrees Fahrenheit (218.333 degrees Celsius). Also, the tin coating wears away with time. In order to protect the coating, one should use wooden or silicone spatulas and avoid cooking acidic foods.

== Process ==
Kalai can be done in various ways. Virgin grade tin (called ‘ranga’ in Hindi), caustic soda, sal ammoniac (ammonium chloride, called ‘nausadar’ powder in Hindi), and water are used in the process.

The first step of kalai is to clean the utensil with water. There are two ways of cleaning the utensil further to remove any impurities such as dust. The first is to clean it with caustic soda. The other is to wash it with dilute acid solution which contains a gold purifying compound known as ‘sufa’. If the latter is used, the utensil should be cleaned immediately after applying the dilute acidic solution as it may bear a mark if not done immediately.

After the cleaning, the vessel is heated on burning coal for about 2 to 3 minutes. The Kalaiwala, Kalaigar or Kalaikar then digs a small pit in the ground to burn the coal. He/she prepares a temporary blast furnace to do kalai and blows air through bellows. After the vessel turns pinkish hot, virgin grade tin (in the form of strips) is applied on the hot vessel. This step is called ‘casting’ by the Kalaigars. The ‘nausadar’ powder is sprinkled on the vessel. The tin melts rapidly which is then rubbed evenly on the utensil with the help of a cotton cloth or a swab of cotton. The rubbing process is known as ‘majaay’ in Hindi. A whitish smoke with the peculiar smell of ammonia is released when the ‘nausadar’ powder is rubbed on the utensil. A silvery lining appears on the vessel with a shine. The final step of kalai is to dip the utensil in cold water.

== Present scenario ==
Kalai was earlier done with silver instead of tin but now it would be too expensive. As stainless steel and aluminum ware came into being, the usage of copper and brass utensils decreased, which led the Kalaigars to suffer losses. Nowadays only some hotels and a very few people use vessels with kalai. As a result, there are a very few Kalaigars left and the art of kalai is vanishing.
