= Kallio (disambiguation) =

Kallio is a district and a neighbourhood in Helsinki, the capital of Finland.

Kallio may also refer to:

- Kallio (surname), a Finnish surname
- Lex Kallio, a Finnish law named after President Kyösti Kallio
- Kallio (TV series), a Finnish television series written by Juha Jokela
- Maria Kallio, a novel series by Leena Lehtolainen
- Kallio, a former village in Greece inundated by the Mornos reservoir

== See also ==
- Kalio, an Indonesian meat dish
