= Kalai =

Kalai may refer to:

== Places ==
- Kalai, Iran, village in Gilan Province, Iran
- Kalai, Cambodia, commune in Ou Chum District in northeast Cambodia
- Kalai Upazila, upazila of Joypurhat District in the Division of Rajshahi, Bangladesh

== Other uses ==
- Kalai (surname)
- Kalai (process), a metalworking process
- Koloi or Kalai, a scheduled tribe in Tripura, India
