= Kalali, Vadodara =

Kalali is a suburban area in south west of the Indian city Vadodara, situated on bank of Vishwamitri River. Kalali is 5 km away from Vadodara railway station. People of this area are mainly Hindu. Akota, Atladara, Bill, Talsat, Chapad are neighbouring areas of Kalali. A government-owned primary school and some private schools like Delhi Public School (DPS), Gujarat Public School (GPS) are located in the area. There is also Shree Ram Krishna Paramhans Hospital in Kalali, which is managed by Shree Shroff Foundation Trust. The saint of Swaminarayan Sampraday late Shree Gopalananad swami has taught in the area and built the Shree Swaminarayan temple in Kalali Dham which is managed by Shree Vadtal Shansthan.
