= Sivatattva Ratnakara =

Sanskrit encyclopedia

Śivatattva Ratnākara
- Author: Keladi Basavappa Nayaka
- Language: Sanskrit
- Genre: Encyclopedia / Itihasa
- Publication date: c. 1709 CE
- Publication place: Keladi Nayaka Kingdom, India

Śivatattva Ratnākara is a 17th-century Sanskrit encyclopedia compiled by King Basavappa Nayaka of the Keladi Nayaka dynasty. Written in verse form, the work consists of 108 chapters (Tarangas) divided into nine sections (Kallolas), comprising approximately 13,000 stanzas.

== Contents and scope ==
While the primary objective of the work was to propagate Shaivism (specifically Veerashaivism), its scope extends far beyond theology, encompassing a vast array of secular and scientific subjects.

=== Religious and philosophical ===
- Shaiva Philosophy: Detailed expositions on the Agamas, the life of Basavanna, and the tenets of the Shakti-Vishishtadvaita school.
- Puranic History: Narratives from the Puranas and the history of the Keladi royal lineage.

=== Secular and scientific ===
The work is highly valued by historians for its documentation of early modern Indian sciences:

- Geography & Astrology (Jyotisha): Descriptions of the known world, cosmology, and planetary movements.
- Botany and Agriculture (Vrikshayurveda): Detailed classifications of plants, soil types, and methods for increasing crop yields.
- Medicine (Ayurveda): Chapters on toxicology, pediatrics, and general health.
- Fine Arts and Architecture (Vastu Shastra): Manuals on music (Sangita), dance (Natya), and temple construction (Shilpa Shastra).
- Statecraft (Rajadharma): Principles of administration, military strategy, and the duties of a king.

== Historical significance ==
The Śivatattva Ratnākara serves as a primary source for the history of the Keladi Nayakas, who were prominent successors to the Vijayanagara Empire. It provides an eyewitness account of the socio-political conditions of South India during the transition from the Vijayanagara era to the rise of local powers and the arrival of European traders.

Śivatattva Ratnākara is recognized by scholars as an important example of early modern Indian encyclopedic literature, reflecting the intellectual and cultural milieu of South India in the post-Vijayanagara period. A study in the Journal of the Royal Asiatic Society characterizes the work as a comprehensive compendium encompassing “all fields of knowledge,” including science, polity, medicine, architecture, and the arts, illustrating the breadth of scholarly production in regional courts.

The text is particularly significant for its multidisciplinary scope, integrating religious, philosophical, and practical knowledge within a unified framework. Such works have been described in Indological scholarship as encyclopedic repositories of traditional knowledge systems, preserving diverse strands of śāstric and applied learning in a single textual tradition.

Specialized studies further highlight the importance of Śivatattva Ratnākara for the history of science and medicine in India. Research published in the Journal of Indian Medical Heritage notes that the text contains detailed discussions of medicine and allied subjects, contributing to the understanding of Ayurveda and related disciplines in the early modern period.

Modern scholarship has also examined its treatment of indigenous scientific knowledge, including physiology, dietetics, and diagnostic practices, emphasizing its role in preserving applied scientific traditions within a broader philosophical and cultural framework.

In addition, the work is significant for understanding courtly knowledge production, as it was composed by a ruling monarch. Historians have noted that early modern South Indian courts functioned as important centers of intellectual synthesis, where political authority, religious traditions, and scholarly activity were closely interconnected.

== See also ==
- Keladi Nayaka
- Sanskrit literature
