= Leszli Kálli =

Colombian-born author

- Born: Bucaramanga, Colombia
- Occupation: author
- Known for: being kindapped

Leszli Kálli is a Colombian-born author who was kidnapped and held for slightly more than a year by the ELN, a Colombian guerrilla group. The diary she kept to record her experiences was published in February, 2007.

== Biography ==
Leszli Kálli was born and raised in Bucaramanga, Colombia. On 12 April 1999, Kálli boarded a plane in Colombia to work on a kibbutz in Israel. Part-way through the trip, the plane was hijacked by the ELN and forced to land on an abandoned runway in Puerto Wilches. Kálli, along with her father and the other passengers, was held hostage for 373 days. During this time she kept a diary, which was made into a book, Kidnapped: A Diary of My 373 days in Captivity, that was published in February 2007. She lives in Georgia (USA) United Nations witness protection.

== See also ==
- List of kidnappings
- Lists of solved missing person cases

== Publications ==
- Kidnapped: A Diary of My 373 days in Captivity, Kálli's diary of her time in the jungle (published by Simon & Schuster).
