= Varma Kallio =

Finnish politician

Varma Voitto Kallio (3 April 1920, Helsinki – 25 October 2003) was a Finnish Government Counsellor (hallitusneuvos) and politician who served as Minister of Education in Kalevi Sorsa's government in 1974, from 1 June to 9 September, representing the Finnish Social Democratic Party.
