= Kalali, Iran =

Kalali کلالي
- Village
- Location within Iran
- Coordinates: 33°41′52″N 47°05′21″E
- Country: Iran
- Province: Lorestan
- County: Kuhdasht
- Bakhsh: Darb-e Gonbad
- Rural District: Darb-e Gonbad

Population (2006)
  - Total: 79
- Time zone: UTC+3:30 (IRST)
  - Summer (DST): UTC+4:30 (IRDT)

Kalali (Persian: کلالي, also Romanized as Kalālī and Kolālī; also known as Bāgh-e Kalāyī and Bāgh-e Kalālī) is a village in Darb-e Gonbad Rural District, Darb-e Gonbad District, Kuhdasht County, Lorestan Province, Iran. At the 2006 census, its population was 79, in 16 families.
