= Lake Kalli =

Lake in Estonia

- Kalli järv (Estonian)
- Location within Estonia
- Coordinates: 58°22.5′N 27°14′E
- Primary inflows: Keravalla River, Säärepa River
- Primary outflows: Kalli River
- Basin countries: Estonia
- Max. length: 3,460 meters (11,350 ft)
- Max. width: 1,140 meters (3,740 ft)
- Surface area: 195.6 hectares (483 acres)
- Average depth: 1.0 meter (3 ft 3 in)
- Max. depth: 1.4 meters (4 ft 7 in)
- Water volume: 1,722,000 cubic meters (60,800,000 cu ft)
- Shore length^{1}: 11,930 meters (39,140 ft)
- Surface elevation: 30.1 meters (99 ft)
- ^{1} Shore length is not a well-defined measure.

Lake Kalli (Estonian: Kalli järv, also Pühajärv or Kaali järv) is a lake in Estonia. It is located in the village of Ahunapalu in Kastre Parish, Tartu County.

== Physical description ==
The lake has an area of 195.6 hectares (483 acres). The lake has an average depth of 1.0 meter (3 ft 3 in) and a maximum depth of 1.4 meters (4 ft 7 in). It is 3,460 meters (11,350 ft) long, and its shoreline measures 11,930 meters (39,140 ft). It has a volume of 1,722,000 cubic meters (60,800,000 cu ft).

== See also ==
- List of lakes of Estonia
