= Leena Lehtolainen =

Finnish crime novelist (born 1964)

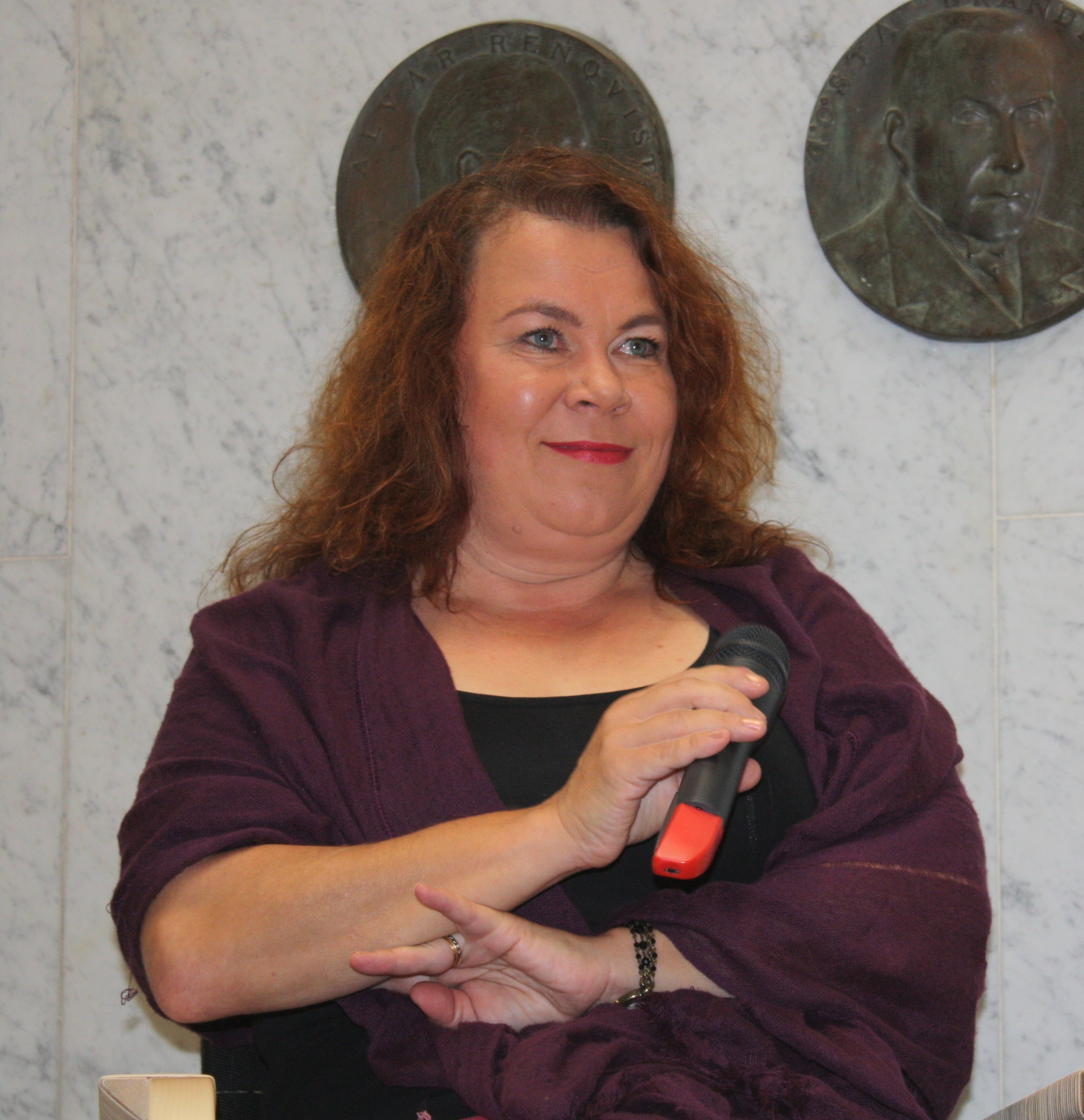
Leena Lehtolainen in 2010

Leena Katriina Lehtolainen (born 11 March 1964) is a Finnish crime novelist, known for her series of novels about the policewoman Maria Kallio.

Lehtolainen won the Finnish crime novel society yearly prize in 1997 and 1998. She received the Espoo city Award of Arts in 2000, and was nominated for the Glass Key award in 2003. In 2020 she received the national Pro Finlandia medal for her artistic merits.

== Bibliography ==
- Ja äkkiä onkin toukokuu (1976)
- Kitara on rakkauteni (1981)
- Ensimmäinen murhani (1993) (published in UK as My First Murder, 2012)
- Harmin paikka (1994)
- Kuparisydän (1995) (published in UK as Copper Heart, 2013)
- Luminainen (1996)
- Kuolemanspiraali (1997)
- Tuulen puolella (1998)
- Tappava säde (1999)
- Ennen lähtöä (2000)
- Sukkanauhatyttö ja muita tarinoita (2001)
- Kun luulit unohtaneesi (2002)
- Veren vimma (2003)
- Jonakin onnellisena päivänä (2004)
- Rivo Satakieli (2005)
- Viimeinen kesäyö ja muita tarinoita (2006)
- Luonas en ollutkaan (2007)
- Väärän jäljillä (2008)
- Henkivartija (2009)
- Minne tytöt kadonneet (2010)
- Oikeuden jalopeura (2011)
- Paholaisen pennut (2012)
- Rautakolmio (2013)
- Kuusi kohtausta Sadusta (2014)
- Surunpotku (2015)
- Tiikerinsilmä (2016)
- Viattomuuden loppu (2017)
- Tappajan tyttöystävä ja muita rikoksia (2018)
- Valapatto (2019)
- Jälkikaiku (2020)
- Ilvesvaara (2021)
- Joulupukin suudelma (2021)
- Antti Ruuskanen – Rätingin paikka (2022)
