= Kali (disambiguation) =

Kali is a Hindu goddess of time, death, and destruction.

Kali may also refer to:

== Arts, entertainment and media ==
=== Film and television ===
- Kali (2016 film), an Indian Malayalam-language film
- Kali (2024 film), an Indian Telugu-language film
- "Kali", a two-part episode of Sanctuary (season 2)
- Kali Gaikwad, a fictional arms dealer in the 2023 Indian Hindi-language film Jawan, played by Vijay Sethupathi
- Kali, a main character on the television series Mongrels

=== Radio stations ===
- KALI (AM), a radio station in California, U.S.
- KALI-FM, a Vietnamese language radio station in California, U.S.
- KMRB, KALI until June 1999, a radio station in California, U.S.

=== Other uses in arts, entertainment and media ===
- Kali (character), in the 1911 novel In Desert and Wilderness
- Kali (chhand), a genre of Punjabi poetry and singing
- Kali (poem), a 1990 poem by Rukmini Bhaya Nair
- Kali (restaurant), a Michelin-starred restaurant in Hollywood, California
- Kali Theatre, a British theatre company
- Kali (Tyeb Mehta), a 1997 painting
- Kali, an asteroid in Arthur C. Clarke's novel The Hammer of God
- My.Kali, an online pan-Arab LGBT magazine
- Kali, a character in the Project Moon game series

== People ==
- Kali (name), including a list of people with the given name, surname or nickname
- Kali (Bulgarian singer) (Galina Dimitrova Ivanova; born 1975)
- Kali (French singer) (Jean-Marc Monnerville; born 1959)
- Kali (footballer) (Carlos Manuel Gonçalves Alonso; born 1978), Angolan footballer
- Kali (painter) (Hanna Weynerowska; 1918–1998), Polish painter

== Places ==
- Kali, Benin
- Kali, Croatia
- Kali, India
- Kali (Daulat Khan), Yavatmal district, Maharashtra, India
- Kali, Iran (disambiguation), or Koli
- Kali, Togo
- Kali River (disambiguation)
- Point Lay, Alaska (Iñupiaq: Kali)
- Monte Kali, spoil tip in Germany

== Religion ==
- Kali (demon), a Hindu evil entity
- Kali Yuga, the age of Kali in Hinduism
- Kali, a birth name of Satyavati, a character in the Mahabharata
- Kali, mother of the Kalakeyas, danavas (demons) in Hinduism
- Kali, one of the seven tongues or flames of Agni, the Hindu god fire
- Saint Sarah, or Kali Sara, patron saint of the Romani people
- Kaliya, a naga (serpent) of the Yamuna River in the ancient Hindu text Bhagavata Purana, killed by Krishna

== Science and technology ==
- Kali (software), an IPX emulator
- KALI (electron accelerator), developed in India
- Kali Linux, a Linux distribution for digital forensics

== Other uses ==
- Kali, a former genus of plants now subsumed into Salsola
- Kali (fish), a genus of snaketooth fish
- Kali language, Niger-Congo language of Cameroon
- Alice International Airport, Texas, U.S., ICAO airport code KALI
- Arnis, or Kali, the national martial art of the Philippines
- Kayah Li alphabet, ISO 15924 code kali
- Kvass, or kali, a traditional fermented Slavic and Baltic beverage
- Sherbet (powder), or kali a fizzy powder sweet
- Kali (restaurant), a Michelin-starred restaurant in Hollywood, California

== See also ==
- Cali, a city in Colombia
- Carly, a name
- Galle, a major city in Sri Lanka
- Kalis (disambiguation)
- Kaali (disambiguation)
- Kalika (disambiguation)
- Kalia (disambiguation)
- Kal (disambiguation)
- Kala (disambiguation)
- Kalki (disambiguation)
- Kall (disambiguation)
- Kalu (disambiguation)
- Kaly (disambiguation)
- Karli (name)
- Khali (disambiguation)
- Kali Yuga (disambiguation)
- Bhadrakali (disambiguation)
- Mahakali (disambiguation)
- Black God (disambiguation)
- Shyama (disambiguation)
