= Kalika =

Kalika may refer to:

- Kali, also known as Kalika, the Hindu goddess associated with universal energy
- Kālikā, a daughter of Dakṣa

== Places in Nepal ==
- Kalika, Chitwan, Bagmati Province
- Kalika, Sindhupalchok, Bagmati Province
- Kalika, Baglung, Gandaki Province
- Kalika, Kaski, Gandaki Province
- Kalika, Dailekh, Karnali Province
- Kalika, Dolpa, Karnali Province
- Kalika, Humla, Karnali Province
- Kalika, Bardiya, Lumbini Province
- Kalika, Kanchanpur, Sudurpashchim Province
- Kalika, Achham, Sudurpashchim Province
- Kalika Rural Municipality, Bagmati Province
- Shubha Kalika, Karnali Province

== Temples ==
- Maula Kalika Temple, Forest, Mountain Peak (Gaindakot, Nawalparasi, Nepal)
- Kalika Mata Temple (disambiguation)

== People ==
- Kalika (footballer) (born 1999), Portuguese footballer
- Kalika Prasad Bhattacharya (1970–2017), Indian folksinger
- Kalika Prasad Shukla (1921–1993), scholar and poet
- Vasily Kalika (14th century), Russian saint
- Kalika Singh (born 1911), Indian politician

== Other uses ==
- Kalika (film), a 1980 Indian Malayalam film
- Kalika Purana, a Hindu text

== See also ==
- Kali (disambiguation)
- Kalikapur (disambiguation) (disambiguation page)
