= Khali =

Khali and similar can mean:

- An empty beat indicating the beginning of a subdivision in the tala rhythmic cycle
- Khali, Jajarkot, a village in Jajarkot district of Karnali province of Nepal
- The Great Khali, an Indian professional wrestler, actor, and former powerlifter
- Rub' al Khali, a large desert in Arabia
- Simbi Khali, born April 28, 1971, an American actress
- Nira Khali, a fictional character from the Saga of Seven Suns series of novels by Kevin J. Anderson
- Ksar el Khali, a town in central-northern Mauritania

== See also ==
- Kali (disambiguation)
- Khala (disambiguation)
- Khalis (name), an Arabic male given name, meaning "pure"
- Khalistan, Sikh separatist movement in India
