= Kal =

Kal may refer to:

== People ==
- Kal (name)
- Kal or KAL, Kevin Kallaugher (born 1955), editorial cartoonist

== Places ==
=== Iran ===
- Kal, Fars, a village
  - Kal Rural District, in Fars Province
- Kal, Kurdistan, a village
- Kal, Susan, a village in Khuzestan Province

=== Luxembourg ===
- Käl, a town

=== Poland ===
- Kal, Poland, a village

=== Slovenia ===
- Kal, Hrastnik, a settlement
- Kal, Ivančna Gorica, a village
- Kal, Pivka, a village
- Kal, Semič, a village
- Kal, Tolmin, a village
- Kal, Zagorje ob Savi, a village

=== Czech Republic ===
- Kal, a village and part of Klatovy in the Plzeň Region
- Kal, a village and part of Pecka in the Hradec Králové Region

== Entertainment ==
- Kal (band), a Romani band from Serbia
- Kal (Doctor Who), the first Doctor Who villain
- Kal: Yesterday and Tomorrow, a 2005 Hindi film

== Business ==
- Kal Tire, a Canadian company
- Kerala Automobiles Limited, an Indian automobile manufacturer

== Language ==
- Kurdish Academy of Language
- ISO 639-2 and 639-3 codes for the Greenlandic language

== Transport ==
- Kalamazoo Transportation Center, station code
- Kallang MRT station, MRT station abbreviation
- Kaltag Airport, IATA airport code
- Korean Air, ICAO code

== Other uses ==
- Kal., abbreviation of the kalends of the Roman calendar
- KAL, the Kadıköy Anadolu Lisesi, a high school in Istanbul, Turkey

== See also ==
- Kall (disambiguation)
- KALS (disambiguation)
- All Wikipedia pages beginning with Kal
- All Wikipedia pages beginning with Kal-e
