= Mahakali (disambiguation) =

Mahakali is the Hindu goddess of destruction and doomsday.

Mahakali may also refer to:

== Arts, entertainment and media ==
- Mahakali (album), a 2008 album by Jarboe
- Mahankali (film), a 2013 Indian film
- Mahakali (film), a 2015 Indian film
- Mahakali — Anth Hi Aarambh Hai, an Indian television series that premiered in 2017
- Maha Kali, a 2004 single by Swedish metal band Dissection

== Places ==
- Mahakali, Baitadi, a village in the Baitadi District of western Nepal
- Mahakali, Darchula, a municipality in Darchula District of Sudurpashchim province in Nepal
- Mahakali, Kanchanpur, a municipality in the Kanchanpur District of Sudurpashchim Province in Nepal
- Mahakali, Nuwakot, a village in the Bagmati Province of central Nepal
- Mahakali Caves, a group of rock-cut monuments located in Andheri, an eastern suburb of Mumbai, India
- Mahakali River, also called Sharda River, a river in Uttarakhand, India
- Mahakali Zone, a former division of Nepal, now part of Sudurpashchim Province

== See also ==
- Kali (disambiguation)
- Mahakal (disambiguation)
- Mahankali Seetharama Rao (1906–1977), chief physician for the first Indian prime minister Jawaharlal Nehru
- Mahakala, a form of the Hindu god Shiva
- Mahakala-Mahakali Temple, Hindu temple in Orissa, India
