= Mahakal =

Mahakal or Mahakaal most often refers to:

- Mahakala, a deity in Hinduism and Buddhism.

Mahakal may refer to:

== Fictional characters ==
- Kavtya Mahakal, a character in the 1990 Indian Marathi-language film Dhadakebaaz.

== Film and television ==
- Mahakaal, a 1994 Indian Hindi-language horror film.
- Mahakaal, a 2008 Bengali film.

== Institutions ==
- Mahakal Institute of Technology, also known as MIT, a university located near Karchha, Ujjain, Madhya Pradesh, India.

== Locations ==
- Makahal cave, a stalactite cave, located at Jayanti, Alipurduar, Alipurduar, West Bengal, India.
- Mahakal Temple, also known as Mahakal Mandir, a Hindu temple located in Darjeeling, West Bengal, India.

== See also ==
- Daikokuten, a syncretic Japanese deity.
- Mahakala omnogovae, a dinosaur genus.
- Mahakala-Mahakali Temple, near Hatasahi, Old Town, Bhubaneswar, Odisha, India.
- Mahakali, a Hindu goddess.
- Mahakali (disambiguation)
- Mahakaleshwar Jyotirlinga, a Hindu temple in Ujjain, Madhya Pradesh, India.
- Praise of Mahakala, a Mongolian Buddhist poem.
