= Im Gyeong-eop =

Korean general (1594–1646)

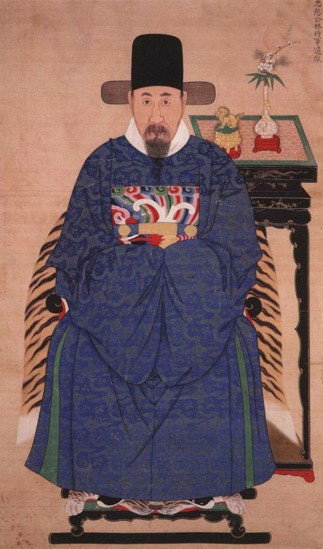

Korean name
- Hangul: 임경업
- Hanja: 林慶業
- RR: Im Gyeongeop
- MR: Im Kyŏngŏp

Im Gyeong-eop (Korean: 임경업; 1594 – 1646) was a Korean general during the Joseon period. He participated in Korea's war against the Later Jin invasion of Joseon and Qing invasion of Joseon in the 17th century. After Ming forces surrendered to the Qing, Im Gyeong-eop was killed by soldiers hired by Kim Chajŏm.

In Korean shamanism, Im Gyeong-eop is worshipped as one of the Janggunsin (Korean: 장군신; Hanja: 將軍神; lit. 'General god').

== Early life ==
He was born in Chungju (충주; 忠州) during the Imjin Wars. As a descendant of a high minister, in 1618 he and his brother applied for military tests and passed. He rose in ranks until the 1624 rebellion of Yi Gwal in which he was placed under general Jeong Chung-shin. He earned great merit in suppressing Yi Gwal's rebels, which led him to promotion and fame. He again rose in ranks such as associate commander (첨절제사; 僉節制使).

In 1627, the Later Jin invasion of Joseon began, and he was sent to Ganghwa Island to assist in its defense, but by the time he arrived, a treaty had already been signed. In 1630, a Ming general, Liu Xingzhi (劉興治), entered Korea and set up camp between a road between two castles. Im was sent to keep an eye on this general and suppress him if needed.

He was later appointed as Northern Defense General and Yongbyon magistrate and was responsible for the defenses of Beakma Mountain Fortress and Uiju Castle. Several Ming rebels crossed the border, only to be defeated by Im, who then also gained a title from the Ming court. In 1634, he was relieved of command after releasing some prisoners, but regained his position two years later, when the government realized his value.

== Second Manchu invasion of Korea ==
The same year Im returned to his position, the Manchus entered Joseon Korea after constant political pressures failed to suppress the nation. Im tied the Manchu forces down at Beakma Fortress and requested reinforcements from the capital, but Kim Chajŏm, a minister who desired the crown, corrupted the message and the Manchu forces headed south.

Soon enough, Namhansanseong (in which the king had fled to) was surrounded by Manchu forces and King Injo surrendered. At that time Im moved his forces to the surrounded capital, and even managed to behead one of the Manchu Generals (要槌, nephew of Hong Taiji), but failed to reach the enemy in time before the surrender. Although Im was called to the Manchu Emperor for beheading his nephew, he was freed because of the recognition of his noble efforts to protect his king and country (not to mention the fact that Im was not aware of the surrender at the time). Im lamented that if he had at least 20,000 men instead of the paltry 3,000, he would have headed north to invade Mukden (then-Qing capital) himself, which may have changed the outcome of the war.

== After war and deceit ==
In 1637, the Manchu Qing Empire requested reinforcements from Joseon to defeat Ming forces, and Im was sent as the Naval relief force. However, Im, wanting to repay Joseon's defeat during the Invasion, secretly sent a message to the Ming forces, revealing the Manchu plan and diminishing Ming casualties and worsening Manchu casualties.

In 1640, he was again sent as reinforcements to the Qing but again he used a Buddhist monk as a messenger to the Ming to replay his double-sided plan. This way, the Joseon forces never actually engaged with the Ming in combat, while the Manchus did most of the fighting. The following year he returned to Seoul where suspicious Qing influence made him lose his rank. However, he soon regained another governmental position.

However, in 1642, a Ming general affiliated with Im surrendered to the Manchus, thus revealing Im's relations with Ming forces. The Manchus immediately sent an arrest force in Korea, who seized Im Gyeong Eop and transported him to Beijing. However, in Hwanghae Province he managed to escape and entered a Buddhist Shrine, where he disguised himself as a monk, only to escape to the Ming a year later.

== Return and death ==
He then fought alongside the Ming forces with Ming general Ma Tenggao (馬騰高). However, Ma's courage failed and the Ming forces surrendered to the Manchus, and Im once again lost his opportunity. He began plotting to escape, but was turned over to the Manchu forces by his subordinate Han Sa-rip (한사립) and transported to Beijing. But at the time in Joseon, a minister named Shim Gi-won (심기원; 沈器遠) attempted a coup, which led to King Injo requesting the return of Im Gyeong Eop for its suppression.

However, on the way back, Im Gyeong Eop was killed by soldiers paid off by Kim Chajŏm, who felt the threat to have Im back in the capital.

== In popular culture ==
- Portrayed by Baek Il-sub in the 1981 KBS1 TV Series Daemyeong.
- Subject of Im Gyeongeop jeon, a fictionalized war novel.
- Im Gyeong-eop, a character based on Im Gyeong-eop, featured in the 2023 game Limbus Company by the Korean game studio Project Moon.

== See also ==
- History of Korea
- First Manchu invasion of Korea
- Second Manchu invasion of Korea
