= Kalikapur =

Kalikapur may refer to:

- Kalikapur, India, a census town in Singhbhum district, Jharkhand, India
- Kalikapur Barasat, a census town in South 24 Parganas district, West Bengal, India
- Kalikapur, Sonarpur, a census town in South 24 Parganas, West Bengal, India

== See also ==
- Kalika (disambiguation)
- Chata Kalikapur, a census town in South 24 Parganas, West Bengal, India
