= Indian Nepalis =

Indian diaspora in Nepal

Indian Nepali भारतीय नेपाली
Regions with significant populations
- Terai region, Kathmandu, Biratnagar, Birganj, Jhapa, Mahakali, Butwal, Chitwan

Languages
- Bhojpuri, Maithili, Marwari, Bangla, Various Nepalese languages

Religion
- Hinduism; Buddhism; Islam; Jainism

Related ethnic groups
- Burmese Indians; Indians in China

Indian Nepali, Indian Nepali or Indo Nepalese, are people of Indian origin who migrated from India to Nepal, predominantly since British India.

The Marwari people have lived in Nepal for several hundred years. They came to Nepal from Rajasthan as traders and flourished in Nepal where there was very little trade activity then. Now the Marwaris control majority of top businesses of Nepal. There are also a few Punjabis and Bengalis in major cities of Nepal. Many Muslims have also emigrated from India to Nepal. A majority of them are involved in low profile works like rickshaw pullers, cobblers, tailors, scavengers etc, while some run small businesses.

In 2001, it was estimated that around 4 million Indians had married Madhesi Nepalis over the previous 35 to 40 years while an estimated 400,000 migrated from India to Nepal, mostly for work.

== See also ==
- India–Nepal relations
- Madheshi people
- Nepali Indian
- 1950 Indo-Nepal Treaty of Peace and Friendship
