= Kalis (disambiguation) =

A kalis is a type of double-edged Filipino sword.

Kalis may also refer to:

== Places ==
- Kalis, Albania
- Kalis, Poland, in Warmian-Masurian Voivodeship
- Kaliś, Poland, in Lesser Poland Voivodeship

== Other uses ==
- Kalis (surname), including a list of people with the name
- Kalis language

== See also ==
- Kali (disambiguation)
