= Khala =

Khala may refer to:

- Khala, Hama, a village in Syria
- Khala, a fictional religion in the StarCraft video game universe
- Khala (dog breed), Bolivian dog breed

== See also ==
- Kahla (disambiguation)
- Khali (disambiguation)
