= Kahla (disambiguation) =

Kahla is a town in Thuringia, Germany.

Kahla may also refer to:

- Kahla, Iran, a village in Iran
- Kahla, Saudi Arabia, a village in southern Saudi Arabia
- Elina Kahla (born 1960), Finnish philologist
- Johann Alexander Hübler-Kahla (1902–1965), Austrian screenwriter and film director

== See also ==
- Al-Kahla District, in Iraq
- Kalha
- Kalla (disambiguation)
- Khala (disambiguation)
