= Kalika Mata Temple =

Kalika Mata Temple may refer to:

- Kalika Mata Temple, Chittorgarh Fort, in Rajasthan state, India
- Kalika Mata Temple, Pavagadh, in Gujarat state, India
- Kalika Mata Temple, Old Dhrewad, in Gujarat state, India

== See also ==
- Kalika (disambiguation)
