= Bhadrakali (disambiguation) =

Bhadrakali may refer to:

- Bhadrakali, a Hindu goddess
- Bhadrakali (film), a 1976 Indian Tamil-language film
- Bhadrakali, Nepal, village in Nepal
- Bhadrakali, Hooghly, neighbourhood in Uttarpara Kotrung, West Bengal, India
- Bhadrakali district, another name of Warangal district, Telangana, India
- Bhadrakali Lake, Telangana, India
- Bhadrakali High School, Gokarna, Karnataka, India

== See also ==
- Bhadra (disambiguation)
- Kali (disambiguation)
- Bhadrakali Temple, Warangal in Warangal, Telangana
