= Amarapuri =

Place in Nepal

Amarapuri अमरापुरी
- Location in Nepal Amarapuri (Nepal)
- Coordinates: 27.69°N 84.27°E
- Nepal: Nepal
- Zone: Lumbini Zone
- District: Nawalparasi District

Population (2011)
  - Total: 8,762
- Time zone: UTC+5:45 (Nepal Time)
- Postal code: 33000

Amarapuri is a town in Gaidakot Municipality in Nawalpur District in the Lumbini Zone of southern Nepal. It became a municipality in May 2014 by merging the existing Mukundapur, Amarapuri, Gaidakot, Nawalparasi, VDCs. At the time of the 2011 Nepal census it had a population of 8,762 living in 1,979 households. Amarapuri has three high schools, the Shree Laxmi Higher Secondary School, Amar Jyoti Higher Secondary School and Amar English Higher Secondary Boarding School.

== Geography ==
Located around 160 km west of the capital city Kathmandu, Amarapuri is the small village bounded by Mukundapur VDC in the east, Rajahar VDC in the west and the Narayani River in the south and Ratanpur VDC in the north. This village is located on a hilly area above the plain that adjoins the Narayani River. It is situated in the lap of Mahabharata hill range.

The majority of families rely on remittances for both their daily needs and income because agriculture is the majority of the population's occupation. Amarapuri exports milk daily from two major dairies, Amarapuri Dhugdha and Amar Bahu Udhasya Sahakari Sastha.

== School and colleges ==
1 Shree Pancha Jyoti lower secondary school.

2 Shree Laxmi higher secondary school.

3 Janamukhi Adharsa Bahumukhi campus.

4 Amar Jyoti secondary school.

5 Unique boarding school.

6 Amar English higher secondary boarding school.

7 Bijay Jyoti primary school.

8 Shree Bal Udaya Primary school
