= Kalia =

Kalia may refer to:

== People ==
- Kalia Davis (born 1998), American football player
- Kalia Kulothungan (born 1977), Indian footballer
- Saurabh Kalia, India Army Officer (Kargil War)

== Places ==
- Kalia, Faranah, in Guinea
- Kalia, Gaoual, in Guinea
- Kalya, Israeli kibbutz and settlement in the West Bank
- Kalia Upazila

== Others ==
- MV Kalia, a small double-hulled oil tanker
- Kalia the Crow, a cartoon character in the popular Indian monthly comic Tinkle
- Khanani and Kalia
- Kalia (watercraft), the Tongan adaptation of a drua or double-hulled Polynesian watercraft
- Elaeocarpus bifidus, a tree known by the common name kalia
- Kalia (curry), a type of curry

== See also ==
- Kali (disambiguation)
- Kaalia (Sholay), a fictional sidekick of the dacoit Gabbar Singh, played by Viju Khote in the 1975 classic Indian film Sholay
- Kaalia, a 1981 Indian action film by Tinnu Anand, starring Amitabh Bachchan
- Kaalia (1997 film), a 1997 Indian action film by T. L. V. Prasad, starring Mithun Chakraborty
- Kalia (Pakistani film), a 1984 Pakistani film
- Kalia, a fictional character in the Indian animated series Chhota Bheem
