= Gaindakot Municipality =

Gaindakot गैँडाकोट
- Municipality (नगरपालिका)
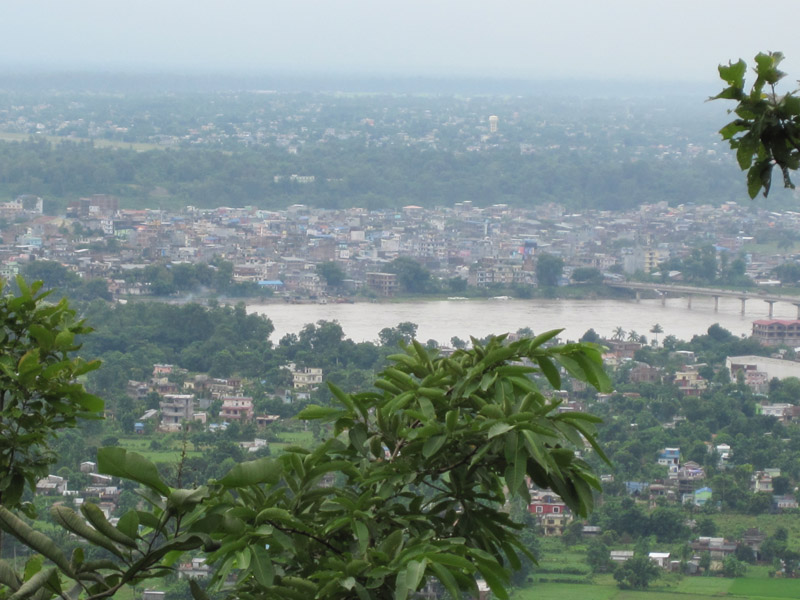

- Location in Nepal Gaindakot (Nepal)
- Coordinates: 27.73°N 84.39°E
- Country: Nepal
- Province: Gandaki
- District: Nawalpur

Government
  - Mayor: Madan Bhakta Adhikari (NC)
  - Deputy Mayor: Shanti Koirala (NC)

Area
  - Total: 159.93 km^{2} (61.75 sq mi)
- Elevation: 201 m (659 ft)

Population (2011)
  - Total: 58,841
  - Density: 367.92/km^{2} (952.9/sq mi)
- Time zone: UTC+5:45 (NST)
- Postal code: 33003
- Area code: 078
- Website: www.gaindakotmun.gov.np

Gaindakot (Nepali: गैँडाकोट, pronounced [ˈɡʌ̃ĩ̯ɽakoʈ]; sometimes spelled Gaidakot) is a municipality in Nawalpur District in the Gandaki Zone of southern Nepal. It became a municipality in May 2014 by merging the existing Mukundapur, Amarapuri, and Gaindakot VDCs. It was again expanded by merging Ratanpur VDC. It is situated on the shore of Narayani River near the Maula Kalika Temple. At the 2011 Nepal census it had a population of 58,841 and 13,623 individual households. The population grew to 79,349 with 20,191 individual household according to 2021 Nepal census.

== Broadcasting ==
Gaindakot has one FM radio station Vijaya FM at 101.6 MHz which is a community radio station. MTV Mukundasen TV, the first channel of Gaindakot, is broadcast from there.

=== Vijay FM ===
Vijaya Community Information & Communication Cooperative Ltd. (VICCOL) was established in 2000 in Gaindakot, Nawalparasi. It established Vijaya FM which first aired on 21 August 2004.

=== Mukundasen TV ===
Popularly known as MTV, it is licensed for cable transmission. Launched in 1st Bhadra in 2007, MTV is part of Mukundasen Media Pvt. Ltd., which also comprises online Radio Mukundasen and online e-paper of MTV e-magazine.

== Industry ==
The large Bhrikuti Paper and Pulp factory shut down in 2011 for financial reasons.
