= Kali River =

Kali River may refer to:

- Kali River (Gujarat), a coastal river in Gujarat, India
- Kali River (Karnataka), a river in Karwar, Uttara Kannada, Karnataka, India
- Kali River (Uttar Pradesh), a river in Saharanpur, Muzaffarnagar and Bagpat districts of Uttar Pradesh, India
- Kali Sindh River, a river in the Malwa region of Madhya Pradesh
- Sharda River, or Kali River, a river demarcating Nepal's western border with India

== See also ==
- Kali (disambiguation)
