= Mukundapur =

Place in Lumbini Zone, Nepal

Mukundapur Nepal मुकुन्दपुर
- Location in Nepal Mukundapur Nepal (Nepal)
- Coordinates: 27.70°N 84.31°E
- Country: Nepal
- Zone: Lumbini Zone
- District: Nawalparasi District

Population (2011)
  - Total: 13,027
- Time zone: UTC+5:45 (Nepal Time)

Mukundapur is a town in Gaidakot Municipality in eastern part of Nawalparasi District in the Lumbini Zone of southern Nepal. It became a municipality in May 2014 by merging the existing Mukundapur, Amarapuri, Gaidakot, Nawalparasi, VDCs. At the time of the 1991 Nepal census it had a population of 7631. According to the 2011 Nepal census, the VDC had a population of 13,027 (Male:6,254 and Female:6,773) living in 3,023 houses. The VDC is historically important as the "Mukundasen Palace" built by King Madimukundasen of Palpa lies here. The VDC is named after this Palace.

== Villages ==
- Sikhrauli
