= Kal (name) =

Kal is both a given name and a surname. Notable people with the name include:

Given name:

- Kal Daniels (born 1963), former Major League Baseball outfielder
- Kal Mann (1917–2001), American lyricist
- Kal Naismith (born 1992), Scottish footballer
- Kal Penn (born 1977), American actor, producer and civil servant, best known for the TV series House and the Harold and Kumar films

Surname:

- Jan Kal (born 1946), Dutch poet
- Miraç Kal (born 1987), Turkish cyclist
- Paulus Kal, 15th-century German fencing master
- Paweł Kal (born 1989), Polish footballer

Fictional:

- Kal-El, real identity of DC Comics superhero Superman
