= Kall =

Kall or KALL may refer to:

== Places ==
- Kall, North Rhine-Westphalia, a municipality in North Rhine-Westphalia, Germany
- Kall, Sweden, a parish in Åre Municipality in the county of Jämtland, Sweden
- Kall (Rur), a river in North Rhine-Westphalia, Germany
- Kallbach ("Kall stream"), a stream in North Rhine-Westphalia, Germany; see list of rivers of Ostwestfalen-Lippe

== Communications ==
- KALL, an all-sports radio station in the Salt Lake City, Utah area
- KWDZ, a defunct radio station (910 AM) formerly licensed to serve Salt Lake City, Utah, formerly broadcasting under the call sign KALL
- Nema (company), a Faroese telecommunications company formerly known as Kall

== Other uses ==
- Kal-L, a superhero in comic books published by DC Comics

== See also ==
- Call (disambiguation)
- Kal (disambiguation)
- Kalla (disambiguation)
- Kalle
- Kallu (name)
