= Im Gyeongeop jeon =

Korean historic war novel

Im Gyeongeop jeon (林慶業傳 The Tale of Im Gyeong-eop) is a historical war novel set against the backdrop of the Manchu invasions in the 17th century, fictionalizing the life of the real historical figure, General Im Gyeong-eop.

== Authorship ==
The author of this work is unknown. There is a copy of Im Gyeongeop jeon that was published in 1780 by the Gyeonggi Provincial Office (currently held at the Yonsei University library in Seoul, South Korea) and we can thus estimate that the original work was likely created sometime before then.

== Plot ==
Im Gyeong-eop loses his father at an early age and dutifully takes care of his mother. When he is 18 years old, he applies to take the military service examination and receives the highest score. He continues to rise in the ranks and makes a name for himself with his skill and talent. In 1624, he accompanies Envoy Lee Si-baek on the Winter Solstice Embassy to China as an army general. Soon afterwards, barbarians decide to attack the Qing. Qing China requests backup forces and Im Gyeong-eop having demonstrated his unusual talent and skill, is made Supreme Commander of Armed Forces by the king and sent to China. Through the use of extraordinary military tactics and strategies, Im manages to suppress the rebellion of the barbarians and becomes famous. Im Gyeong-eop spends six years in China and then finally returns to Joseon.

Kim Jajeom, a premier in Joseon, nurses a desire to overthrow the regime but fearing Im Gyeong-eop, he does not dare to act on his desires. Meanwhile, Qing China gradually becomes more powerful under Hong Taiji. The Joseon Royal Court, seeing the precarious situation near the Yalu River, decides to make Im Gyeong-eop the leader of the provincial government in Uiju County to defend themselves. The Qing ruler, knowing that he cannot defeat Im Gyeong-eop, instead sends Yonggoldae, a general of the Qing, and his troops to Seoul. The Joseon king escapes to the Namhan Mountain Fortress, but ultimately surrenders. Im Gyeong-eop, later discovering this fact, attacks the Qing army on their way their home country and soundly defeats them.

The Qing Emperor, in order to conquer the Ming, decides he must first eliminate Im Gyeong-eop. He thus sends a letter to Joseon commanding Im Gyeong-eop to attack the Ming army residing on Piseom island. Im Gyeong-eop informs this to Hwang Jamyeong, a Ming general, and the Ming forces decides to fake their surrender. The Qing Emperor figures out their plan and decides to capture Im Gyeong-eop and send him away. Im Gyeong-eop nevertheless manages to escape and seeks asylum in the Ming Empire.

The Qing Empire slowly becomes stronger and invades Nanjing. Dokbo, one of the people that Im Gyeong-eop brought with him, secretly communicates with the Qing Empire and forges a letter from the general of the Ming Empire and sends it to Im Gyeong-eop. Im Gyeong-eop receives the fake letter and goes on a boat with Dokbo, only to be captured by the Qing army. The Qing Emperor attempts to reconcile with Im Gyeong-eop, but Im Gyeong-eop pulls out a knife and rebukes him. The Qing Emperor, resigned to Im Gyeong-eop's steadfastness, sends him back to Joseon with various presents as offerings.

In Joseon, Kim Jajeom's power has significantly increased. Convinced that Im Gyeong-eop's return will signal the demise of his plans of rebellion, Kim Jajeom helps brand Im Gyeong-eop as a traitor. Upon finally returning to his homeland after numerous hardships, Im Gyeong-eop is thrown in prison. Furthermore, Kim Jajeom secretly hires numerous soldiers that beat Im Gyeong-eop to death. Afterwards, the Joseon king has a dream where Im Gyeong-eop appears and the circumstances of Kim Jajeom's crime are revealed. Kim Jajeom is executed, and at the end of the month, a memorial hall to extol Im Gyeong-eop is erected in the country. Im Gyeong-eop's wife, Madame Lee, hears about his death and commits suicide. Im's descendants retreat deep into the mountains and spend the rest of their lives farming and isolated from the rest of the world.

== Features and significance ==
A passage dated August 10, 1790, from Jeongjosillok (正祖實錄 The Veritable Record of King Jeongjo) briefly mentions a murder at a tobacco store in Jongno. At the time, the general masses enjoyed novels through jeongisu (傳奇叟), professionals that would read novels out loud to the people. One person, listening to the recitation of Im Gyeongeop jeon, became excessively immersed in the scene where Kim Jajeom drove Im Gyeong-eop to his death. That person took a knife used for cutting and packaging tobacco and cried, "Are you Jajeom?!" and killed the reciter. The fact that the king at the time, King Jeongjo, mentioned this incident in his records indicates that this was an extremely famous incident at the time. Although the title of the novel that inspired the killing is not mentioned in the Jeongjosillok, Sim Nosung's (沈魯崇, 1762–1837) collection of texts, Hyojeonsango (孝田散稿 The Collection of Hyojeon's Writings), describes this incident in more detail. Due to his records, it is now known that the work that sparked the murder was, in fact, Im Gyeongeop jeon.

A considerable portion of Im Gyeongeop jeon is fabricated. The only part that has historical validity is the episode that mentions Im Gyeong-eop, during the Manchu War of 1636, attacked and defeated 300 of the Qing Empire's returning cavalry. Other parts of the story are fictional anecdotes made to enhance his heroism, such as the accounts of him being sent to the Qing Empire of China as an envoy and suppressing the rebellion there. Although Kim Jajeom and Dokbo are also real historical figures, they were not actually involved in plotting Im Gyeong-eop's death. The episode where Kim Jajeom plots Im Gyeong-eop's murder was first created by Song Siyeol (宋時烈, 1607–1689) in Imjanggungyeongeopjeon (林將軍慶業傳 The Tale of General Im Gyeong-Eop). Song Siyeol paints the pro-Qing dynasty faction member, Kim Jajeom, as a disloyal traitor, and Im Gyeong-eop as the incarnation of Ming loyalism. Thus, Im Gyeongeop jeon can be seen as a work that strongly establishes clear orientations with regard to hostility towards the Qing dynasty (and pro-Qing factions) and loyalty to the Ming dynasty.

== Other ==
Kim Hun's novel, Namhansanseong (남한산성 The Fortress of Namhan Mountain), as well as "Namhansanseong", a film of the same name that was based on Kim's novel, are also works that center around the Manchu War of 1636.

== Archival materials ==
There are around 40 extant copies of Im Gyeongeop jeon, including versions in Korean and classical Chinese. The Korean versions include handwritten manuscripts, woodblock prints created in Seoul, as well as those printed with movable type. The classical Chinese versions are handwritten manuscripts.
