= Kaali =

Kaali may refer to:

- Kali or Kaali, Hindu goddess
- Kaali, Estonia, village in Saaremaa Parish, Saare County, Estonia
  - Kaali crater, group of meteorite craters in Kaali
- 4227 Kaali, asteroid, named after Kaali crater
- Kaali (1980 film), an Indian film by I. V. Sasi shot simultaneously in Tamil and Telugu
- Kaali – Ek Agnipariksha; Indian TV series (2010–2011)
- Kaali – Ek Punar Avatar; Indian TV series (2012–2013)
- Kaali (2018 film), 2018 Indian Tamil-language film by Kiruthiga Udhayanidhi

== See also ==
- Kali (disambiguation)
