= Paweł Kal =

Polish footballer

Personal information
- Full name: Paweł Kal
- Date of birth: 9 July 1989 (age 37)
- Place of birth: Kielce, Poland
- Height: 1.78 m (5 ft 10 in)
- Position: Defender

Youth career
- 2003–2008: Korona Kielce

Senior career*
Years	Team	Apps	(Gls)
2007–2009	Korona Kielce II	19	(1)
2008–2014	Korona Kielce	19	(0)
2011	→ Olimpia Grudziądz (loan)	13	(2)
Total		51	(3)

International career
2009	Poland U21	2	(0)
- * Club domestic league appearances and goals

Paweł Kal (born 9 July 1989) is a Polish former professional footballer who played as a defender.

== Club career ==
In February 2011, he was loaned to Olimpia Grudziądz on a half-year deal.

In 2014, after suffering his third ACL tear, he was forced to retire from football.

== International career ==
He was a part of Poland national under-21 football team in 2009.

== Honours ==
Olimpia Grudziądz

- II liga West: 2010–11
