= Kahla, Saudi Arabia =

Village in Southern Saudi Arabia

Coordinates: 17.5651°N 43.2434°E

Kahla Village is a village located in the extreme south of Saudi Arabia close to the border with Yemen, part of 'Asir Province.

== Population ==
The village hosts approximately 2000 people, according to the latest statistics. Kahla is home to the AalShban and Maqbol clans of All taleed tribe.

== Climate ==
The climate is moderate in summer and cold in winter.

== Natural resources ==
Vegetation includes grasslands and pine forest. Other resources include fishing for hares, bustard and alboran.
