= Khali, Jajarkot =

Khali खाली
- Village
- Location in Nepal
- Coordinates: 28.7143°N 82.2313°E
- Country: Nepal
- Province: Karnali
- District: Jajarkot
- Municipality: Bheri
- Time zone: UTC+5:45 (NST)

Khali (Nepali: खाली) is a village located in Bheri municipality in Jajarkot District of Karnali Province of Nepal. The aerial distance from Khali to Nepal's capital Kathmandu is approximately 323 km.

== See also ==
- Bheri, Jajarkot
