= Kalis (surname) =

Kalis is a surname. Notable people with this surname include:

- Henry Kalis (1937–2018), American politician
- Jan Kališ (1930–2003), Czech cinematographer
- Josh Kalis (born 1976), American skateboarder
- Kyle Kalis (born 1993), American football player
- Sterre Kalis (born 1999), Dutch cricketer
- Todd Kalis (born 1965), American football player

== See also ==
- Kali (name)
- Khalis (name), given name and surname
