= Maula Kalika Temple =

Hindu temple in Nepal

- मौलाकालिका मन्दिर
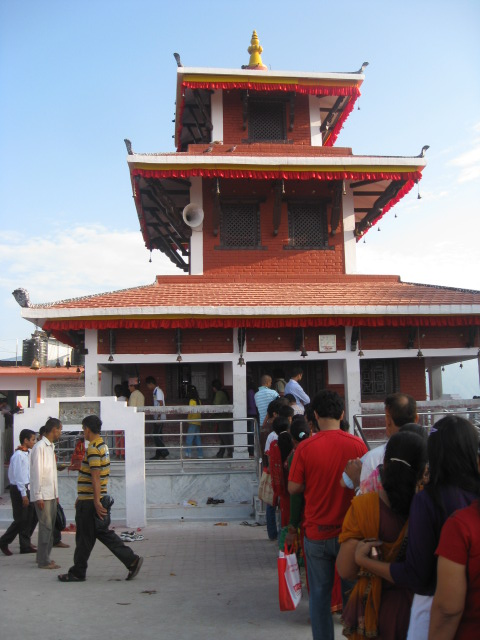
- Maula Kalika Temple in Gaindakot town of Gandaki Province in Nepal

- Location within Nepal

Religion
- Affiliation: Hinduism
- District: Nawalparasi
- Deity: Kalika

Location
- Location: Gaindakot
- Country: Nepal
- Interactive map of Maula Kalika Temple
- Coordinates: 27.7275°N 84.4088°E

Architecture
- Elevation: 561 m (1,841 ft)

Website
- www.maulakalika.org.np

Maula Kalika (Nepali: मौलाकालिका मन्दिर, pronounced [ˈmʌu̯la kalika]) is a temple to the Hindu goddess Kali in Gaindakot town of Nawalpur district in Gandaki province of Nepal. Located on the top of the Mauladada or Maula hill on the north of the Narayani River (also called the Gandaki River) in Gaindakot, Maula Kalika temple is 561 metres (1,841 ft) above sea level. Visitors/devotee can reach the temple via the Maulakali Cable Car, enjoying a scenic ride of just 6–8 minutes.

== Gallery ==
Stone carvings and arts on the Maulakalika temple foot trail.

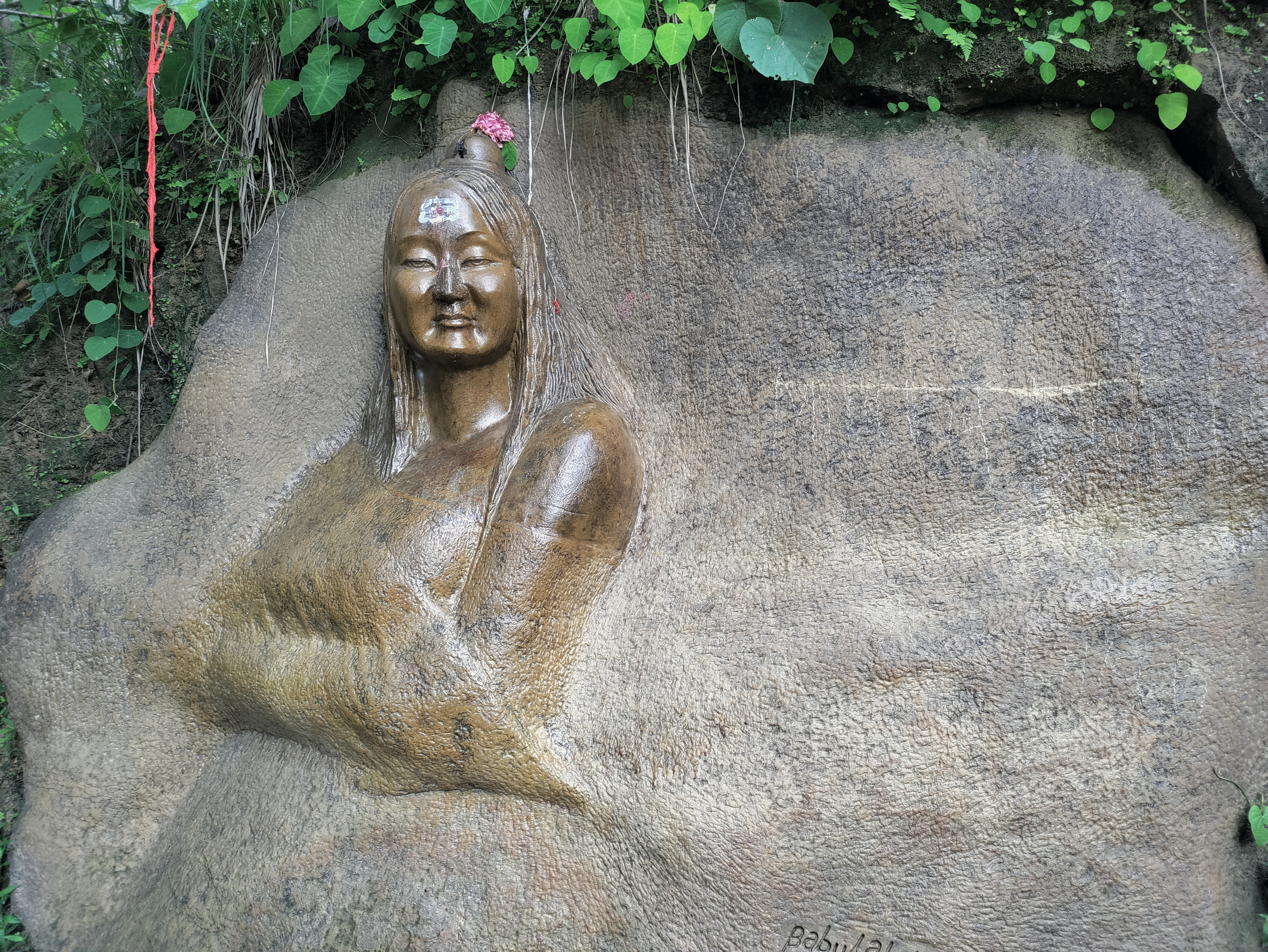

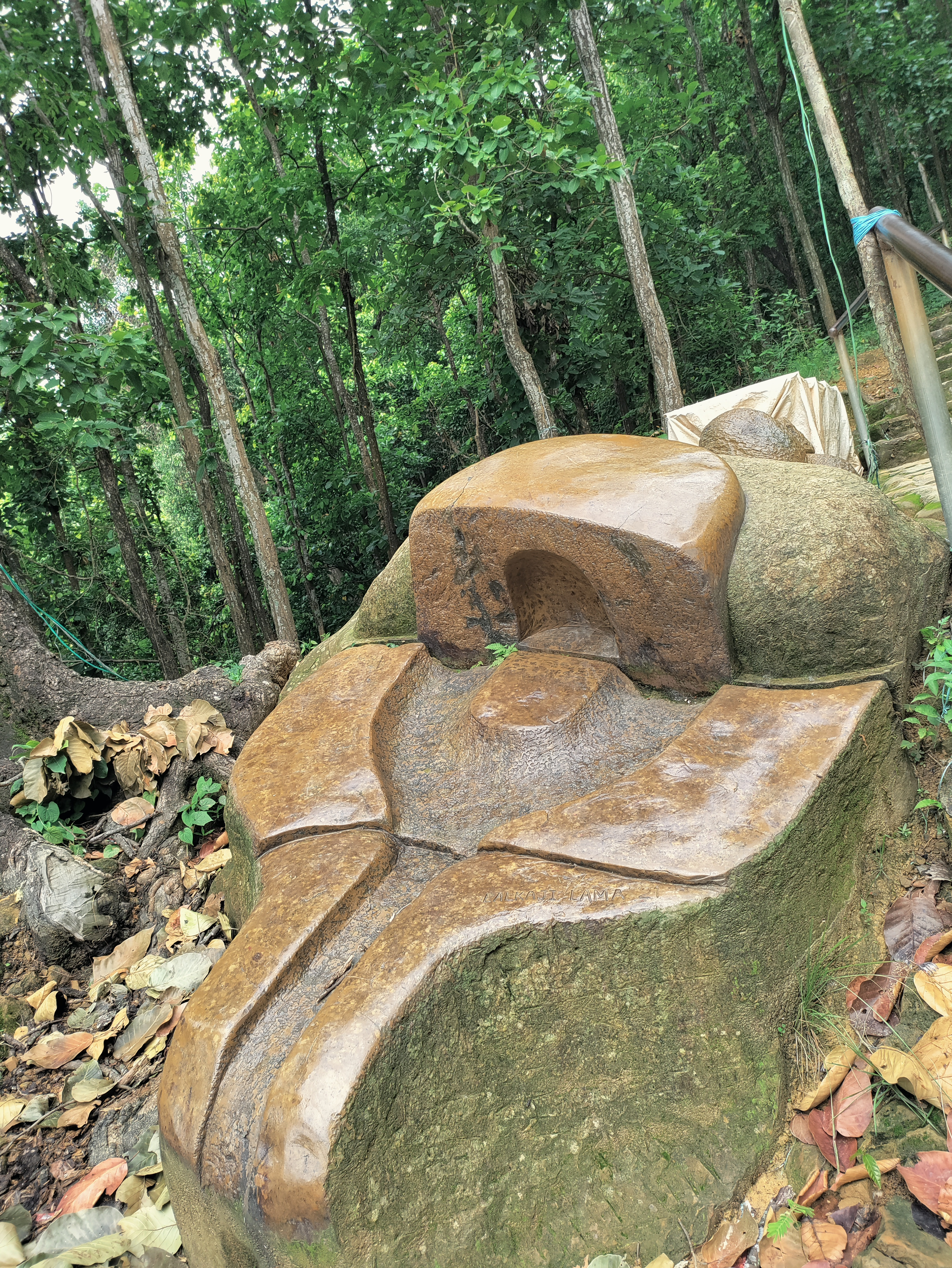

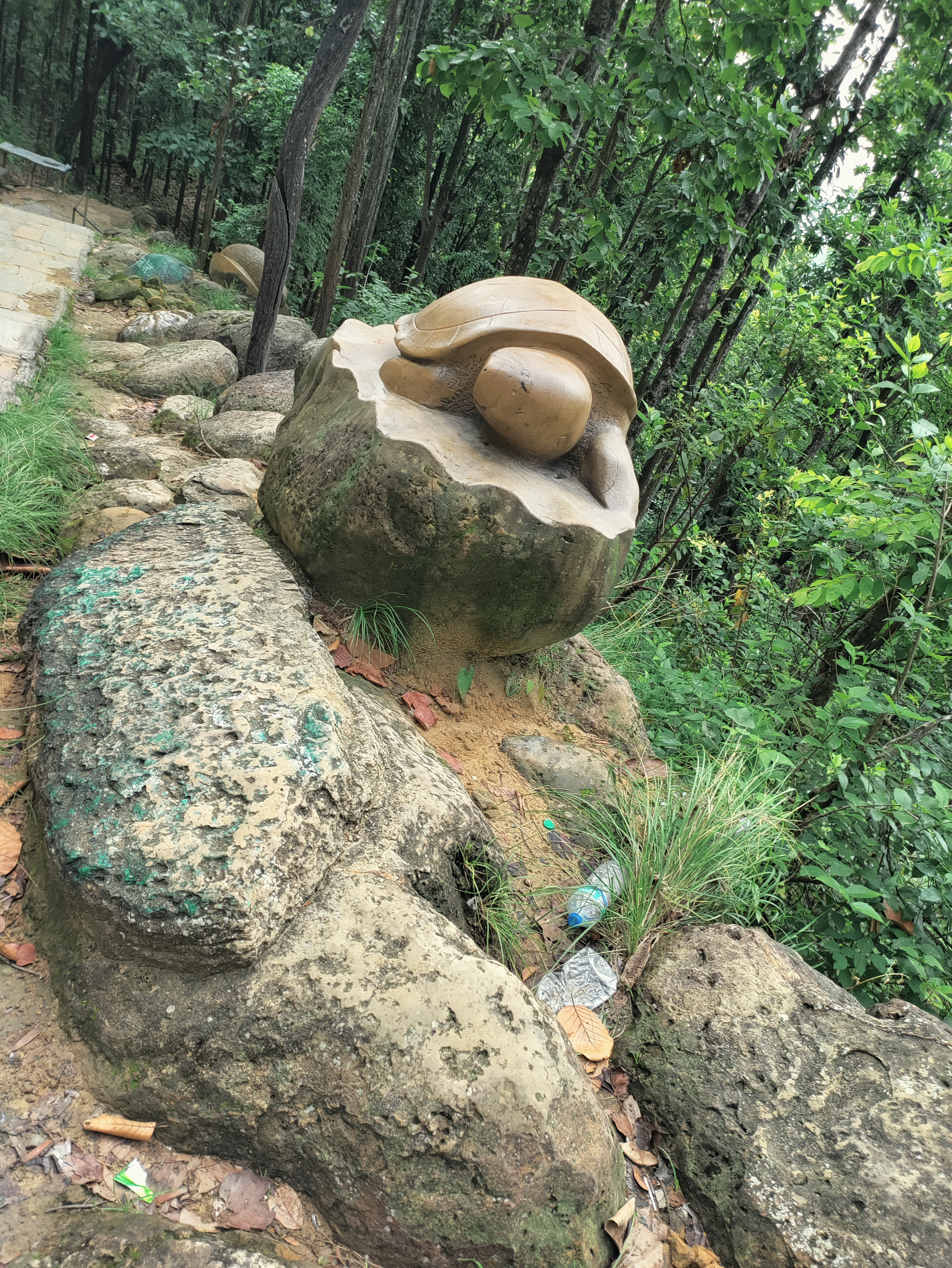

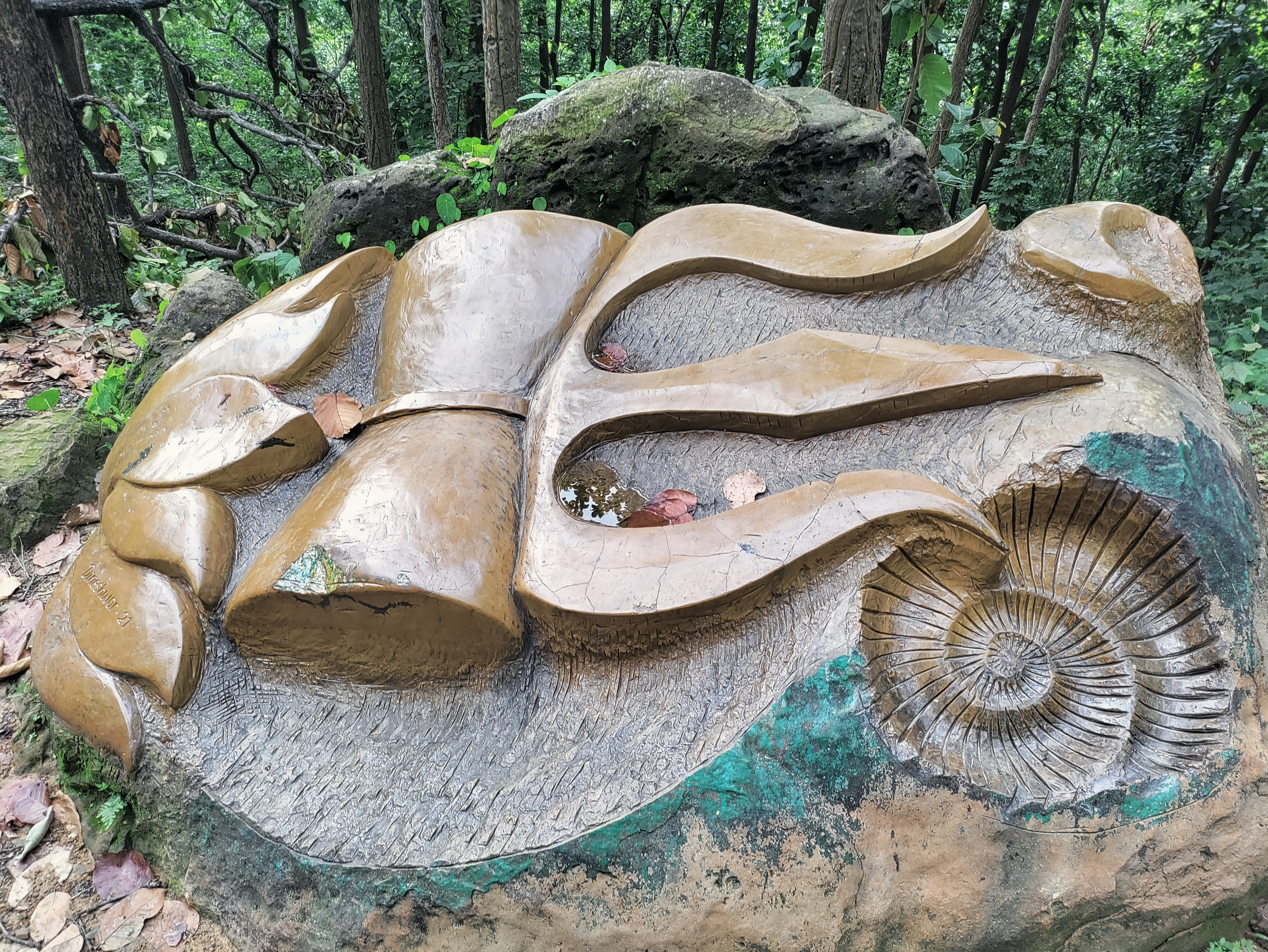

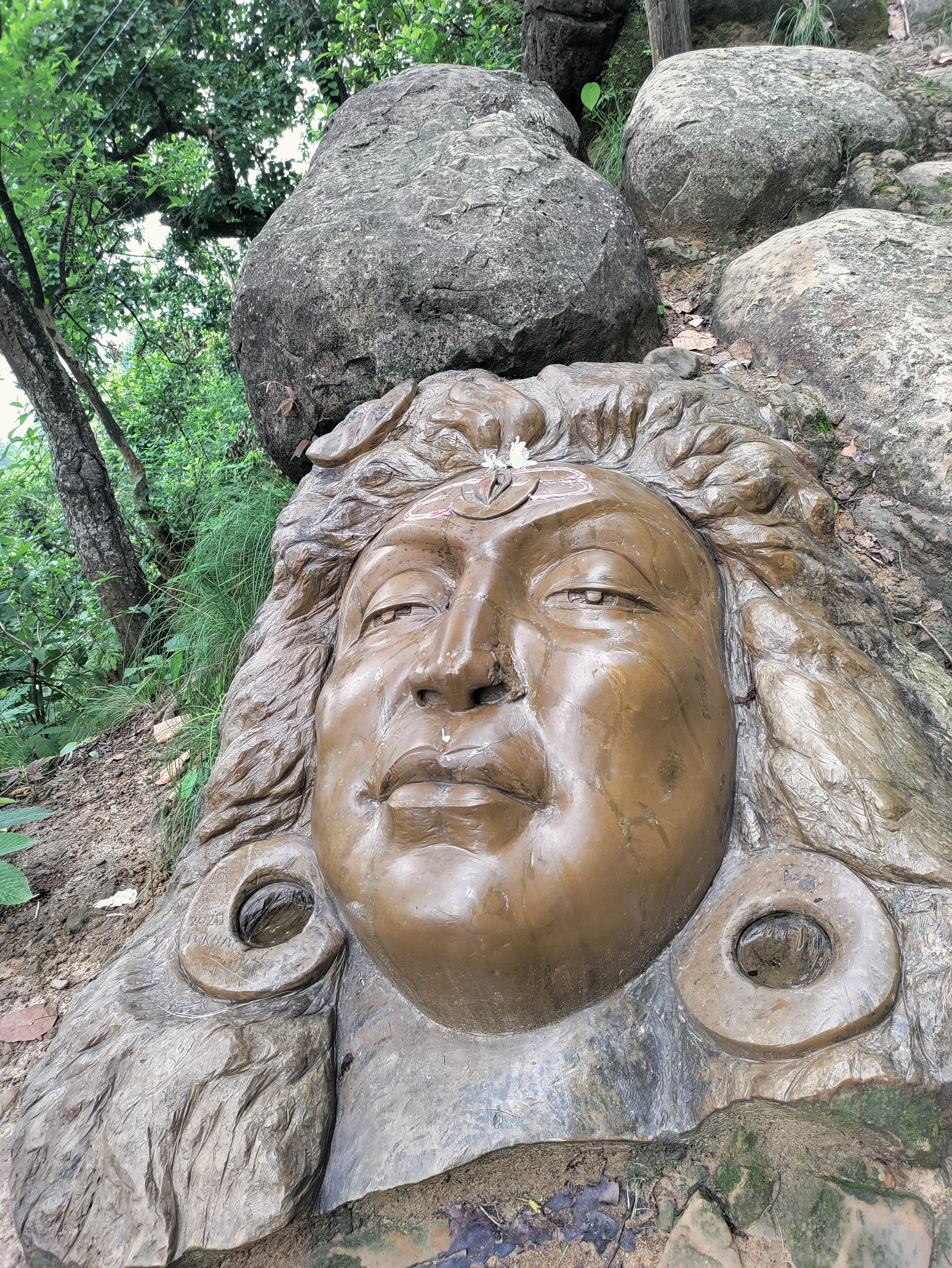

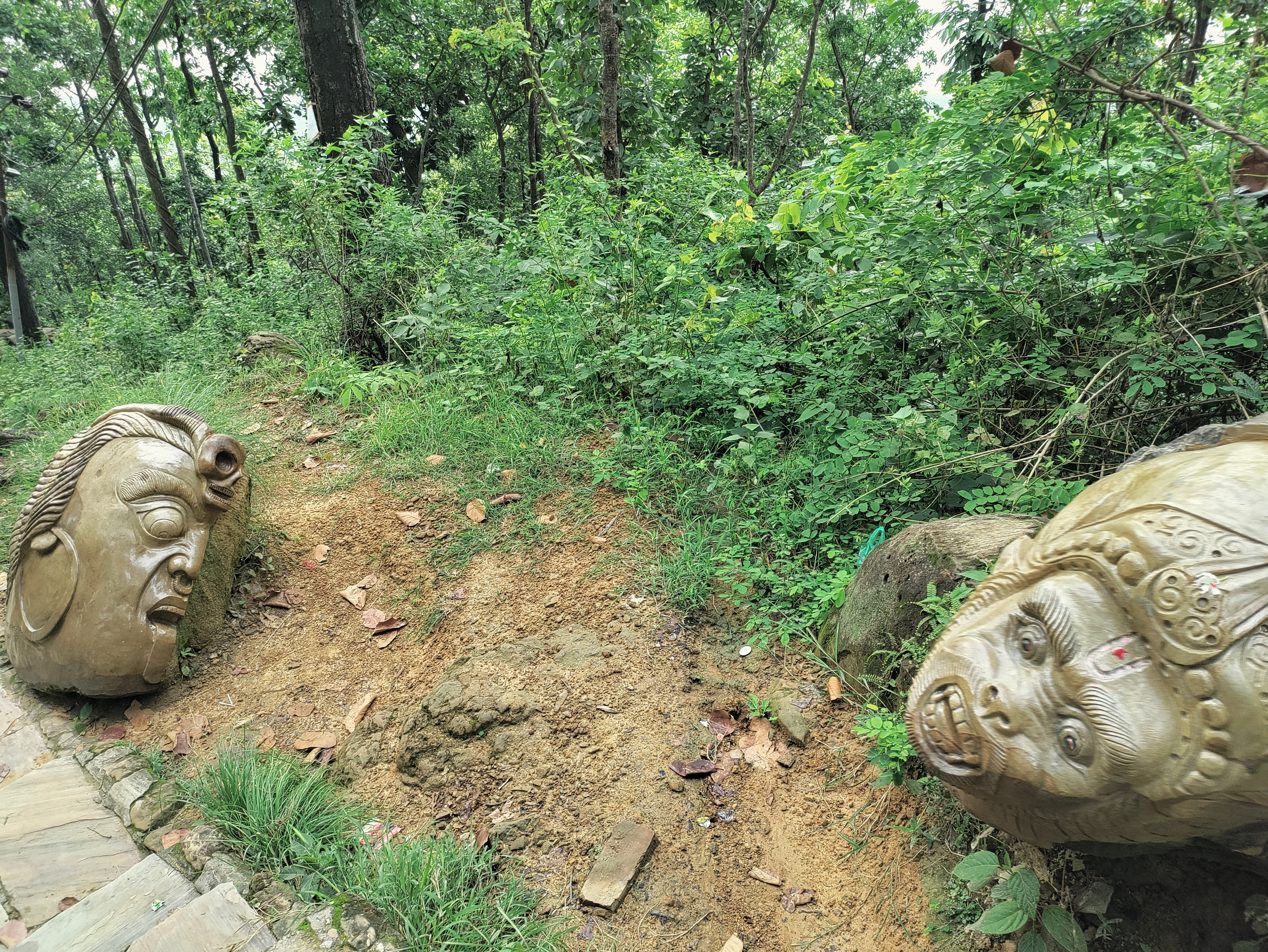

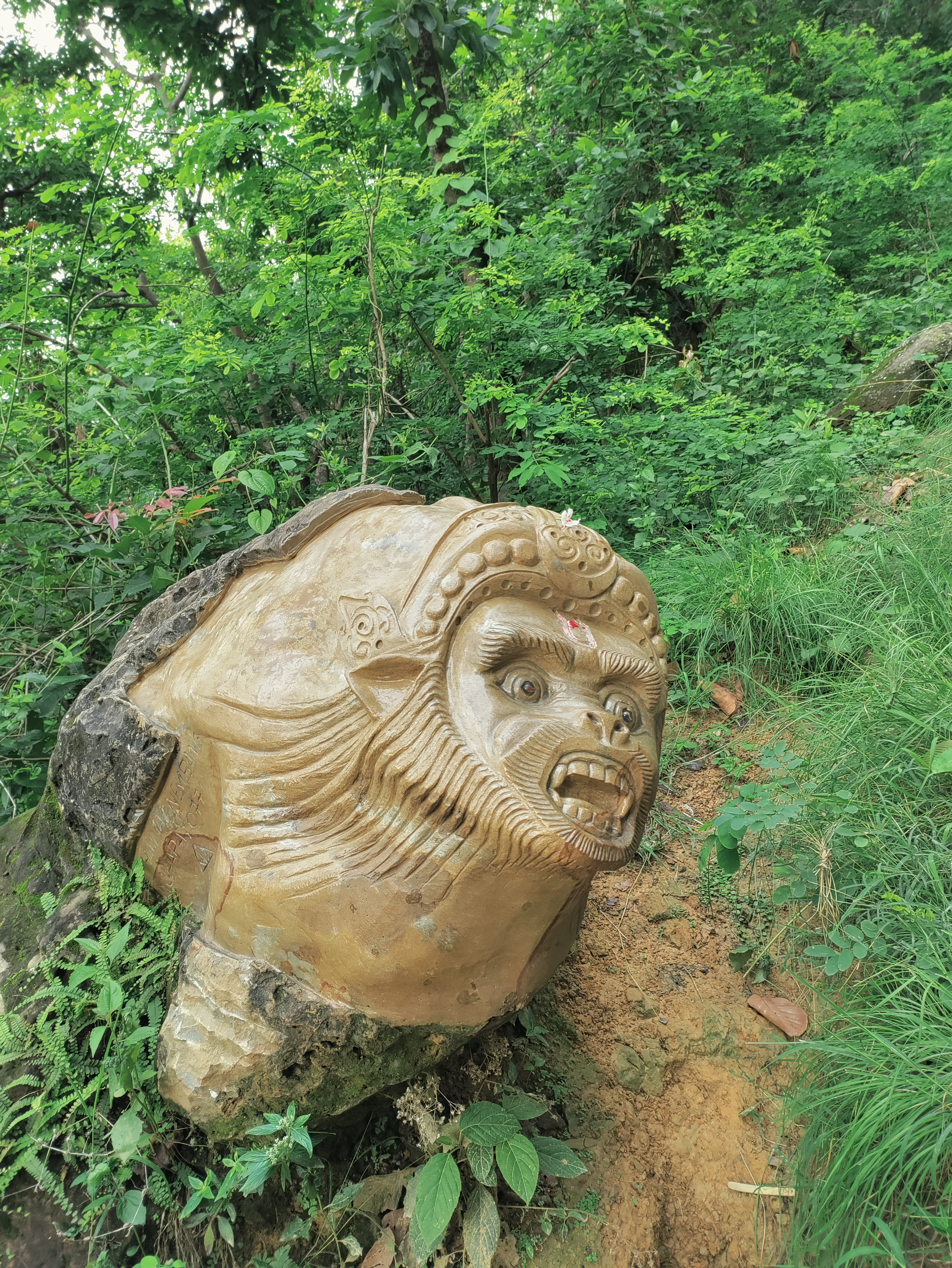

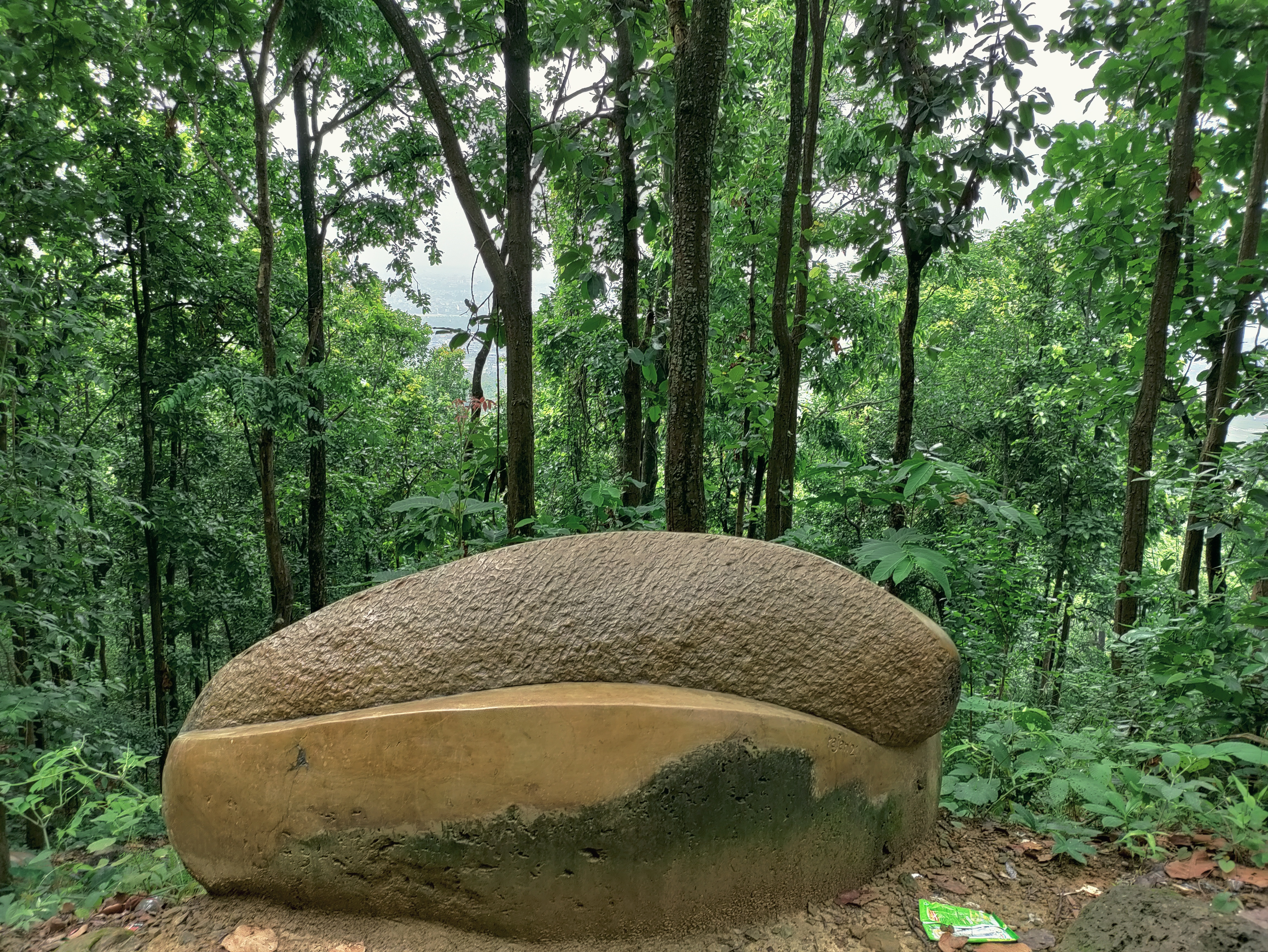

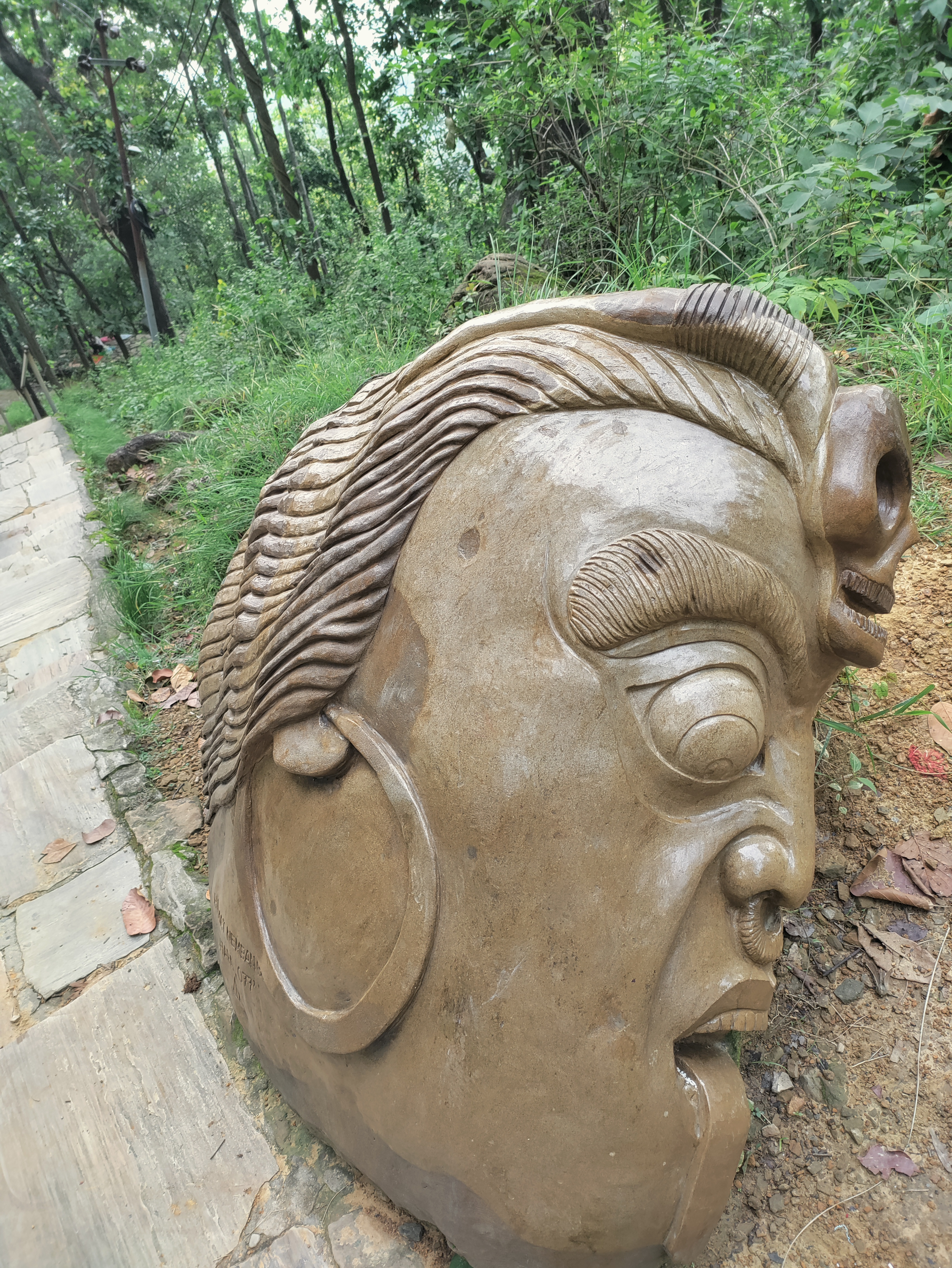

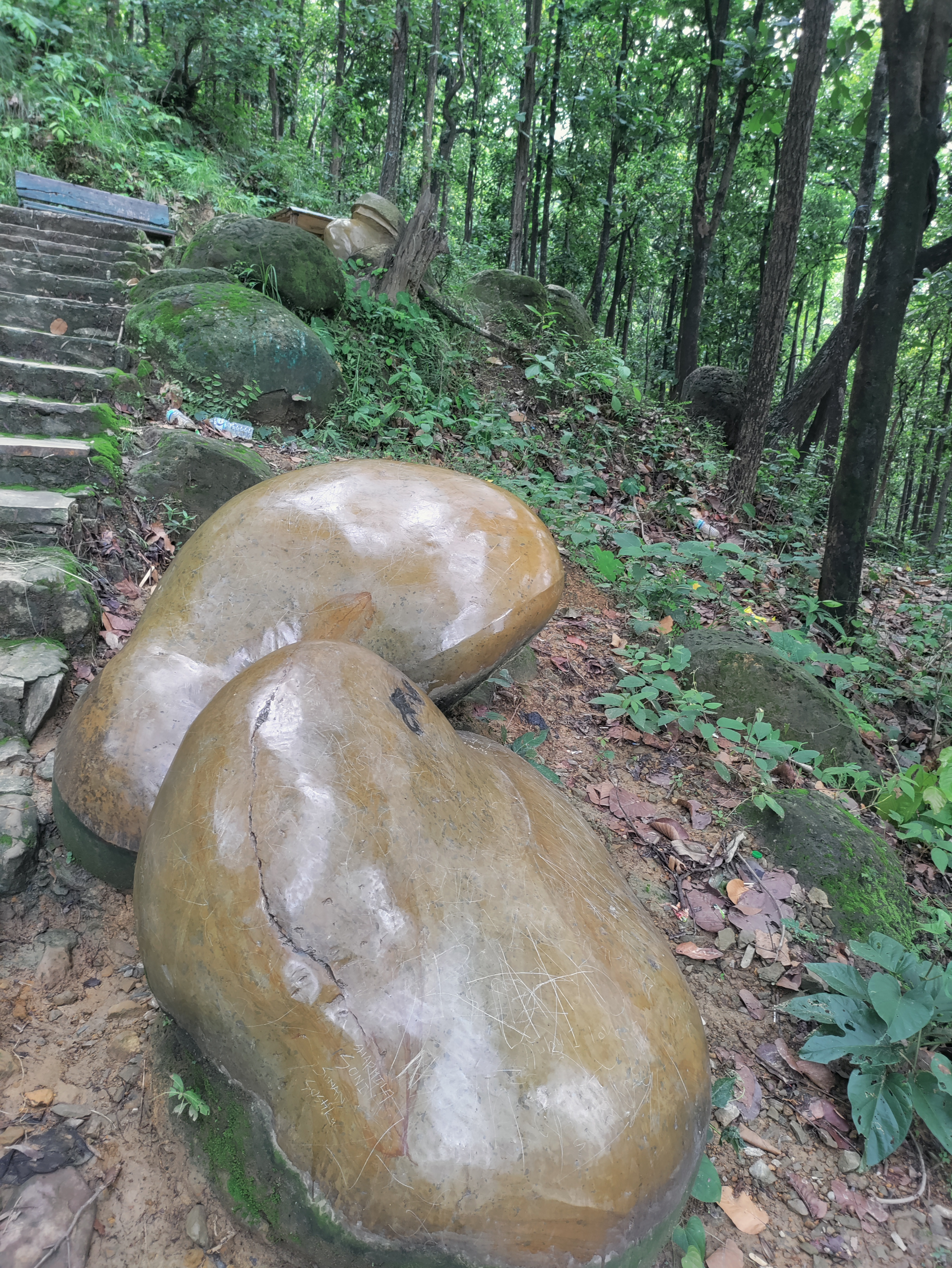

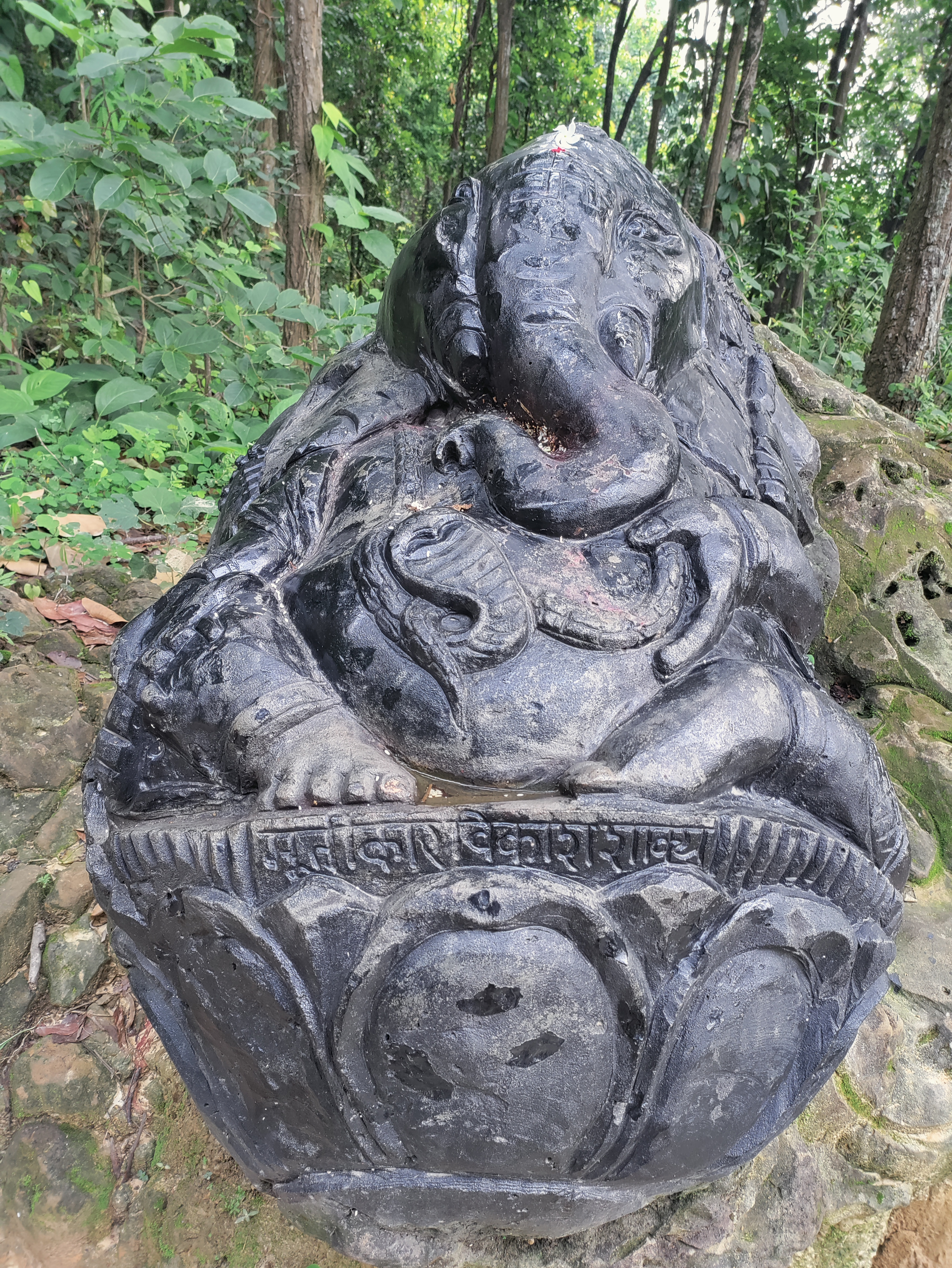

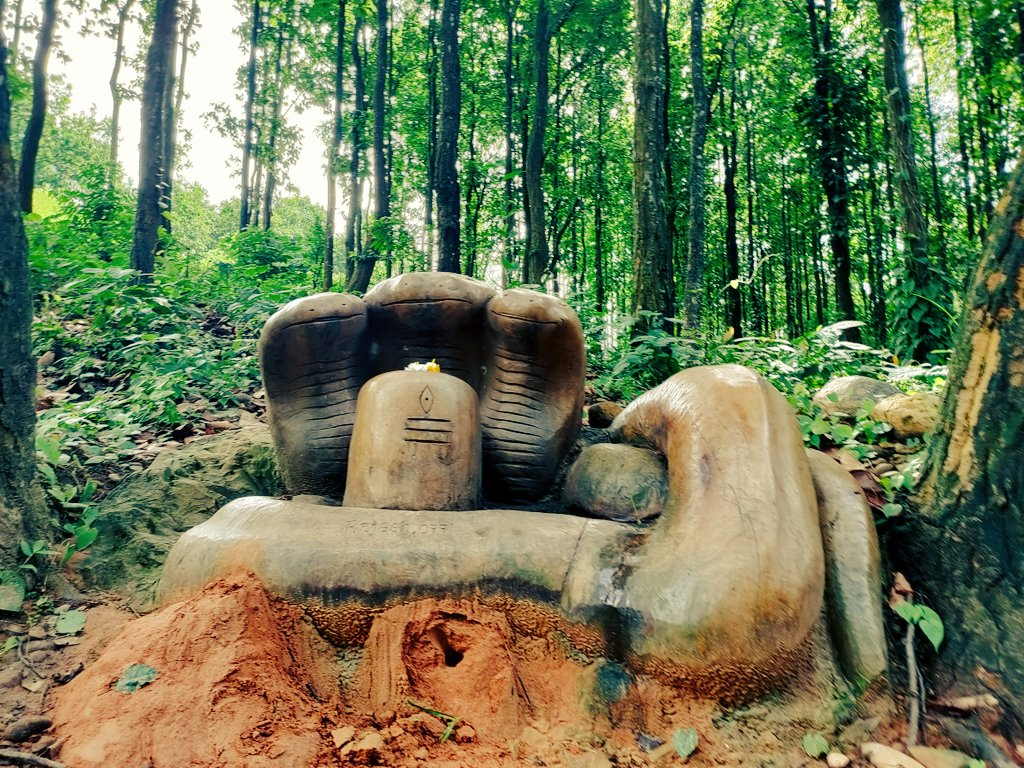

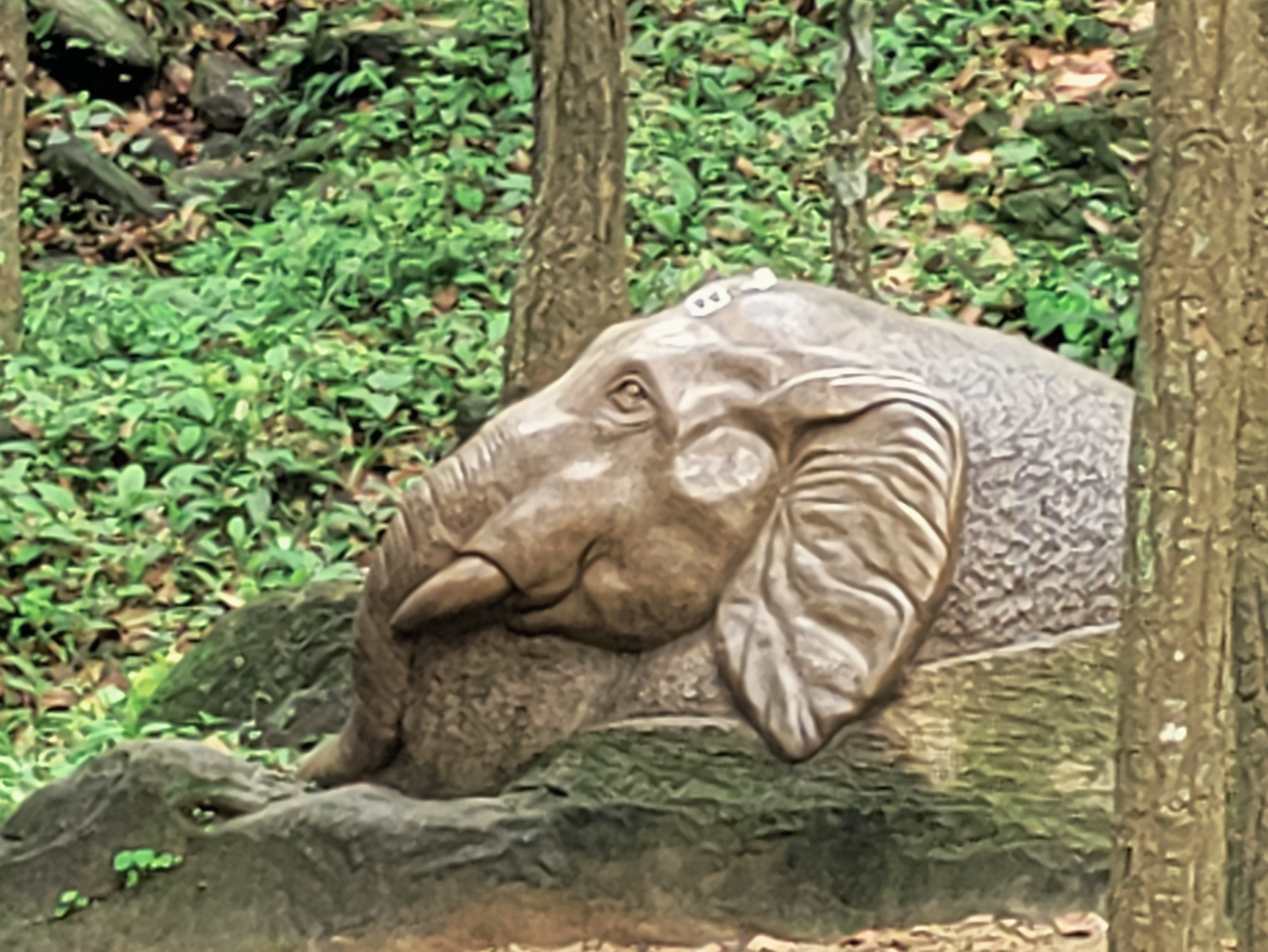
