= Al-Khula =

Al-Khula الخلا Khala
- Village
- Location in Syria
- Coordinates: 35°10′43″N 36°53′47″E
- Country: Syria
- Governorate: Hama
- District: Hama
- Subdistrict: Hama

Population (2004)
  - Total: 457
- Time zone: UTC+3 (AST)
- City Qrya Pcode: C2959

Al-Khula (Arabic: الخلا, romanized: al-Khulā; also transliterated Khala or al-Khulla) is a village in central Syria, administratively part of the Hama Governorate, located east of Hama city. According to the Syria Central Bureau of Statistics (CBS), al-Khula had a population of 457 in the 2004 census. Its inhabitants are predominantly Alawites.

== History ==
Al-Khula was sold by a sheikh of the Bani Khalid, a Bedouin tribe of central Syria, to the Barazi, a prominent landowning family of Hama city, sometime during the first thirty years of the 20th century. Its inhabitants were Alawite tenant farmers who were settled there in the 1920s or early 1930s.

== Bibliography ==
- Comité de l'Asie française (April 1933). "Notes sur la propriété foncière dans le Syrie centrale (Notes on Landownership in Central Syria)". Bulletin du Comité de l'Asie française (in French). 33 (309). Comité de l'Asie française: 130–136.
