= Kall, Sweden =

Village in Åre Municipality, Jämtland County, Sweden

Kall
- Locality
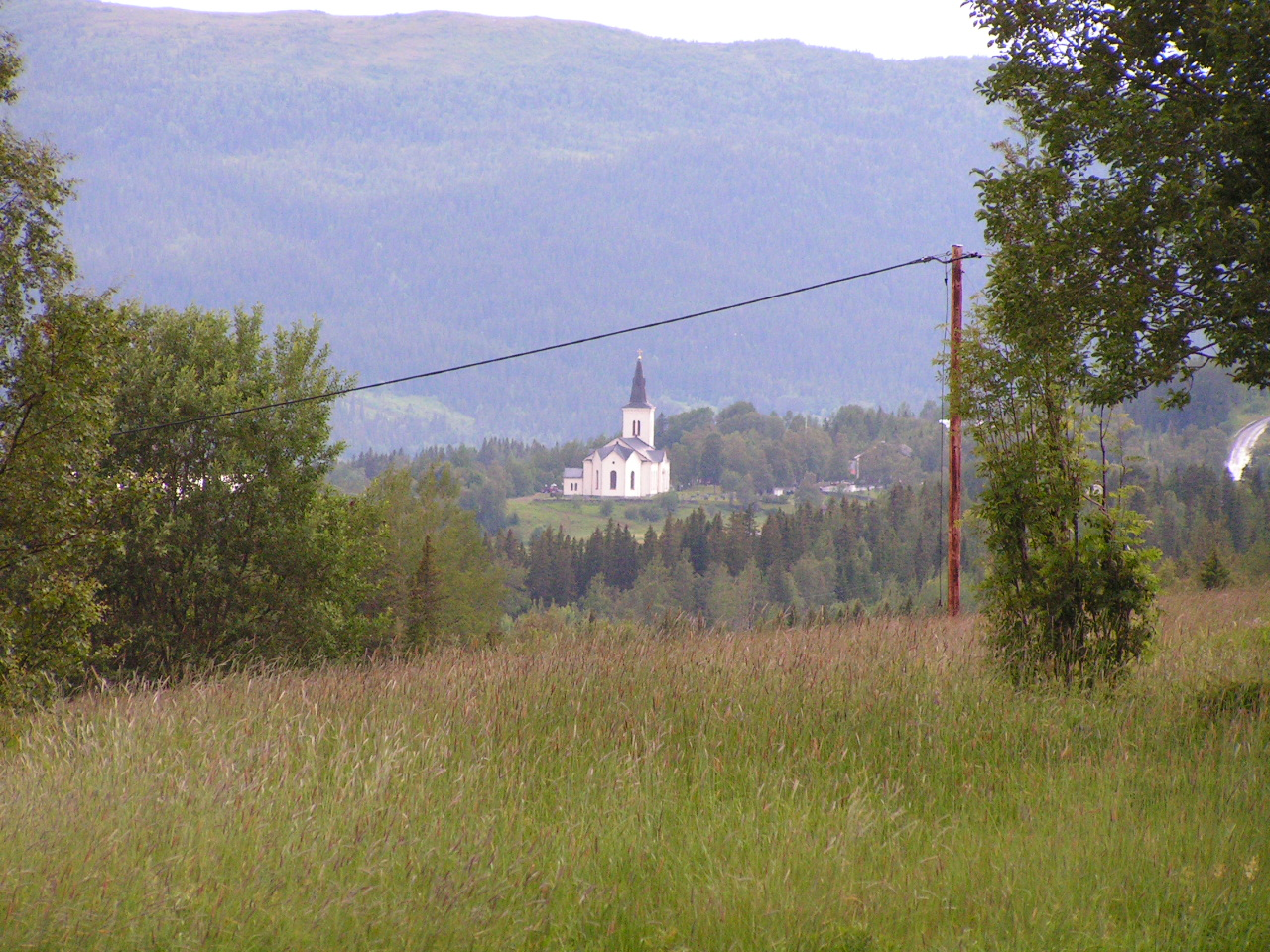
- A picture of Kalls Kyrka from the neighbouring village of Sölvsved

- Location of Kall in Sweden Kall (Sweden)
- Coordinates: 63.473889°N 13.230556°E
- Country: Sweden
- County: Jämtland County
- Municipality: Åre Municipality

Population
  - Total: 107

Kall is a smaller locality located in Åre Municipality, Jämtland County, Sweden with a population of 107 inhabitants. The parish church of Kalls Kyrka in Kall Parish is located within the smaller locality.
