= Khalis (name) =

Khalis (Arabic: خالص) is a given name and surname. Notable people with the name include:

- Khalis Bayyan or Ronald Bell (1951–2020), American singer-songwriter
- Mehdi Khalis (born 1989), Moroccan footballer
- Mohammad Yunus Khalis (c. 1919–2006), Afghan mujahideen commander
- Khalis the Mummy, fictional character from DC Comics

== See also ==
- Kalis (surname)
