= Kalika, Baglung =

Kalika, Baglung कालिका
- Village development committee
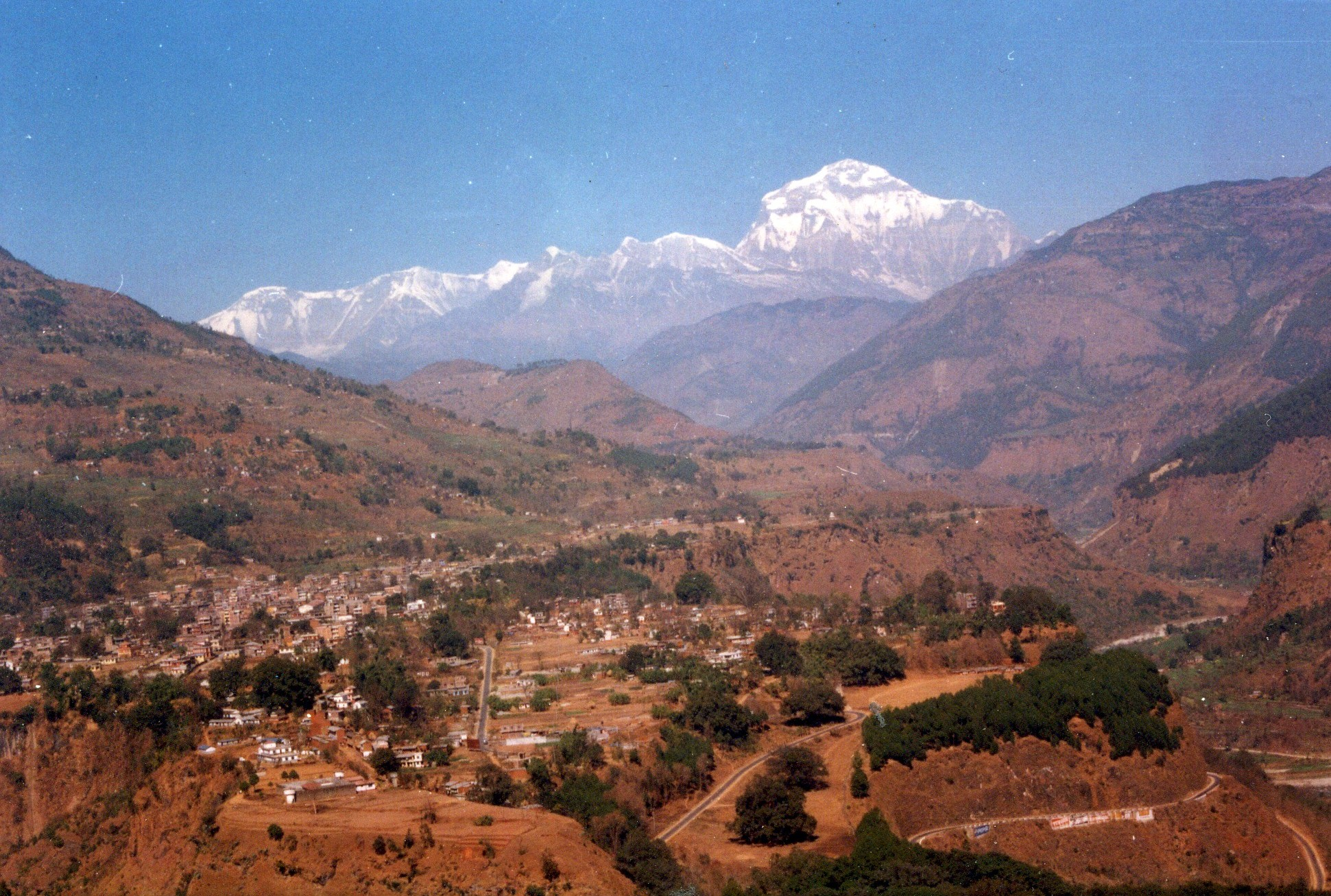
- Country: Nepal
- Zone: Dhawalagiri Zone
- District: Baglung District

Population (1991)
  - Total: 8,266
  - Religions: Hindu
- Time zone: UTC+5:45 (Nepal Time)

Kalika is a village development committee in Baglung District in the Dhawalagiri Zone of central Nepal. At the time of the 1991 Nepal census it had a population of 8,266 and had 1602 houses in the town.
