= Kali (DK) =

Village in Maharashtra

Kali (Daulat Khan) Mahurmarg
- village
- Location in Maharashtra, India Kali (Daulat Khan) (India)
- Coordinates: 19°56′37″N 77°43′54″E
- Country: India
- State: Maharashtra
- Founder: Daulat Khan

Population
  - Total: 25,000

Languages
  - Official: Urdu, Hindi, Marathi
- Time zone: UTC+5:30 (IST)
- PIN: 445204
- Telephone code: 07236
- Vehicle registration: MH 29

Kali (Daulat Khan) is a village in the Yavatmal district of Maharashtra, India. It is named after Daulat Khan Patel. Kali (DK) is 20 km away from Pusad, which is to the east of Mahagaon. The population of Kali (DK) is around 25,000.

Daulat Khan founded Kali (DK) in the middle of the 19th century. Kali was famous for education at that time. Children from the near-around villages would come to Kali for education. Today, there are 2 Urdu schools, 4 Marathi schools, 2 Ashram Shala, and One Jr. College in Kali.

== Notable features ==
Four kilometres from Kali there is a waterfall, known locally as "Bhad bhadi". There is also a mountain known as Shadaval Pahad in between nearest village Hiwari. "Bhad bhadi" means waterfall looking beautiful nature in that place School trip always visit

== Language and culture ==
People of different religions and communities live in Kali, including Hindus, Muslims, Buddhist, Banjari and others. The principal languages of Kali (DK) are Hindi Urdu and Marathi, but various other languages are spoken there, including Urdu, Gormati, Banjari.

== Agriculture ==
Kali is considered a Tribal village, and has many farmers. Major crops include cotton (kapoos), tur (yellow beans), and jawar. Kali's agriculture suffers because of unavailability of water in most of the village. Kali has a problem with drinking water. Some years ago Laghu Pat Bandhare kalawa stand for this major problem and it was solved with the help of nearby villages grampanchayat. Agriculture is often impacted by droughts, floods, or heavy rains.

== Schools ==
- Z.P. Marathi School
- S.N. Urdu High school
- V.N. High School and Junior College
- Ashram Shala
- Alhaj Athar Mirza Ashram Shala
- Z.P. Urdu school
- Nalanda English Medium School for Nursery, KG-1, KG-2
- Navjeevan English medium school 1st to 10th
