= Kali (restaurant) =

Restaurant in Hollywood, California, U.S.

- Interactive map of Kali

Restaurant information
- Owners: Kevin Meehan; Drew Langley
- Head chef: Kevin Meehan
- Dress code: No
- Rating: (Michelin Guide)
- Location: 5722 Melrose Ave., Hollywood, Los Angeles, California, 90038, United States
- Coordinates: 34°5′0.2″N 118°19′28″W

Kali is a Michelin Guide-starred restaurant in Hollywood, California, United States.

In July 2025, Kali eliminated their tasting menu and replaced it with an à la carte mid-century steakhouse menu.

== See also ==
- List of Michelin-starred restaurants in California
