= KALS =

KALS may refer to:

- KALS (FM) radio station, Kalispell, Montana, US
- San Luis Valley Regional Airport, Alamosa, Colorado, US, ICAO code
