= Kalika (footballer) =

Portuguese footballer

Personal information
- Full name: Carlos Filipe Teixeira Moreira
- Date of birth: 8 December 1999 (age 26)
- Place of birth: Paredes, Portugal
- Height: 1.86 m (6 ft 1 in)
- Position: Midfielder

Youth career
- 2007–2011: Paredes
- 2011–2012: Paços Ferreira
- 2012–2013: Paredes
- 2013–2018: Penafiel

Senior career*
| Years | Team | Apps | (Gls) |
| 2018–2021 | Penafiel | 6 | (0) |
| 2020–2021 | → Marinhense (loan) | 4 | (0) |
| 2021 | → União Santarém (loan) | 8 | (0) |
- * Club domestic league appearances and goals as of 31 August 2021

Carlos Filipe Teixeira Moreira (born 8 December 1999) known as Kalika, is a Portuguese footballer who plays as a midfielder.

== Club career ==
He made his LigaPro debut for Penafiel on 19 May 2019 in a game against Leixões.
