= Kalikapur, India =

Kalikapur
- Census town
- Location in Jharkhand, India Kalikapur (India)
- Coordinates: 22.62°N 86.28°E
- Country: India
- State: Jharkhand
- District: East Singhbhum
- Elevation: 158 m (518 ft)

Population (2001)
  - Total: 3,786

Languages
  - Official: Hindi, Santali
- Time zone: UTC+5:30 (IST)
- Vehicle registration: JH

Kalikapur is a census town in East Singhbhum district in the Indian state of Jharkhand.

== Geography ==
Kalikapur is located at 22.62°N 86.28°E. It has an average elevation of 158 metres (518 feet).

== Demographics ==
As of 2001 India census, Kalikapur had a population of 3,786. Males constitute 52% of the population and females 48%. Kalikapur has an average literacy rate of 90%, higher than the national average of 59.5%: male literacy is 93%, and female literacy is 87%. In Kalikapur, 6% of the population is under 6 years of age.
