= Project Moon =

Project Moon may refer to:

- Project Moon, a South Korean studio which has released Limbus Company, Library of Ruina, and Lobotomy Corporation.
- Project Moon, a replica of the Moon proposed for construction at Dubai Pearl.
- Project Moon, a home video DVD release for the 1981 television series Danger Mouse.
- Project Moon, the original name for Operation Braddock.
- Project Moon, a battle royale title that was in development by Midnight Society, headed by Dr Disrespect.
