= Mahakala-Mahakali Temple =

Mahakala-Mahakali Temple.
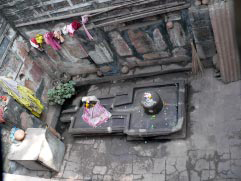

- Location in Orissa

Religion
- Affiliation: Hinduism
- Deity: lord Mahakala- Mahakali

Location
- Location: Bhubaneswar
- State: Orissa
- Country: India
- Interactive map of Mahakala-Mahakali Temple.
- Coordinates: 20°14′15.39″N 85°50′3.51″E

Architecture
- Type: Kalingan Style (Kalinga Architecture)
- Completed: 11th century A.D.
- Elevation: 22 m (72 ft)

Mahakala-Mahakali Temple was built around 11th century A.D. and is located at Latitude of- 20 degree 14’ 26" N., Longitude of- 85 degree 50’ 05" E and Elevation of- 71 ft. It is situatedted beyond the eastern compound wall of Lingaraja temple on the right side of the temple road leading to Hatasahi, Old Town, Bhubaneswar, Odisha, India. It is a shrine without a superstructure. The presiding deity is a Siva-lingam within a square yonipitha at a depth of 4.00 m below the present ground level. The shrine with stone walls is open to the sky. Close to the main deity is another small Siva lingam within another yonipitha which is known as Mahakali, while the central lingam is known as Mahakala. .According to the local tradition they are the parents of Lord Lingaraja.

== Physical description ==
=== Surrounding ===
The temple is surrounded by the eastern compound wall of Lingaraja temple on its western side at a distance of 6.00 m and Hatasahi road on its east.

=== Architectural features ===
The temple has no superstructure and the deities are 4.00 m below the present road level which is provided with flight of fifteen steps down to the sanctum.

=== Building techniques ===
It is made up of sandstone by dry masonry construction techniques.

== Conservation problem and remedies ==
Since the shrine is 4.00 m down the precinct road level there is no outlet for discharge of offering water and the rain water directly entering into the shrine. In rainy season water stagnates inside the shrine, which is cleared manually. In the western side of the cella there are seven detached sculptures and architectural members which have been deeply weathered beaten and eroded. The sculptures are four armed Ganesa, two nayikas, four armed female deity, udyota simha, amlaka etc.
