= Carl (name) =

- Pronunciation: Urban East Norwegian: [kɑːl] Swedish: [kɑːɭ]
- Gender: Male

Origin
- Origin: Old Norse
- Meaning: "Free man"

Other names
- Related names: Karl, Charles, Carlo, Carlos, Carolus, Carol, Carlton

Carl is the English spelling of the North Germanic male given name meaning "free man". The name originates in Old Norse. It is the first name of many Kings of Sweden including Carl XVI Gustaf. It is a variant of the English Charles, and the Latin Carolus.

== List of people named Carl ==
=== Royalty and nobility ===
- Carl Bernadotte (1911–2003), Swedish prince
- Carl Johan Bernadotte (1916–2012), Swedish prince
- Carl XVI Gustaf (born 1946), King of Sweden 1973 to present
- Prince Carl Philip, Duke of Värmland (born 1979), Prince of Sweden
- Prince Carl, Duke of Västergötland (1861–1951), Swedish prince

Most other Swedish and Norwegian royalty so named – see Carl of Sweden – are listed on English Wikipedia as Charles.

- Carl, Duke of Württemberg (1936–2022), head of the House of Württemberg from 1975 to 2022
- Carl Mannerheim
  - Count Carl Erik Mannerheim (1759–1837)
  - Count Carl Gustaf Mannerheim (1797–1854)
  - Count Carl Robert Mannerheim (1835–1914)
  - Count Carl Erik Johan Mannerheim (1865–1915)

=== As a given name ===
- Carl Abbott (urban historian) (born 1944), American historian
- Carl Abrahams (1911–2005), Jamaican artist
- Carl Adams (wrestler) (born 1950), American wrestler, coach and businessman
- Carl Albert (1908–2000), American politician and lawyer
- Carl Anderson (singer) (1945–2004), American singer and actor
- Carl Asercion (1909–1990), American steel guitar player
- Carl Ballantine (1917–2009), American actor
- Carl Banks (born 1962), American football player
- Carl Barât (born 1978), British musician
- Carl Barber (born 1956), Canadian Haskap berry grower
- Carl Barks (1901–2000), American cartoonist, author, and painter
- Carl Barron (born 1964), Australian comedian
- Carl Bengtström (born 2000), Swedish athlete
- Carl Benner, American electrical engineer
- Carl Bergenstråhle (1909–1977), Swedish diplomat
- Carl Berman (born 1985), American football player
- Carl Bildt (born 1949), Swedish politician and diplomat
- Carl August Björk (1837–1916), Swedish preacher
- Carl L. Boeckmann (1867–1923), Norwegian-American artist
- Carl Bradford (born 1992), American football player
- Carl "Charlie" Brandt (1957–2004), American serial killer
- Carl Brashear (1931–2006), U.S. Navy master diver
- Carl Braun (basketball) (1927–2010), American basketball player
- Carl Brewer (politician) (1957–2020), American politician
- Carl Byrum (born 1963), American football player
- Carl Caldenius (1887–1961), Swedish geologist
- Carl Carlton (born 1953), American singer-songwriter
- Carl Clark (1933–2015), American photographer
- Carl Cohen (businessman) (1913–1986), American gambling executive and Las Vegas casino manager
- Carl Cohen (philosopher) (1931–2023), professor of philosophy at the University of Michigan, philosopher, and animal rights activist
- Carl Colpaert, American film director
- Carl Crawford (born 1981), American baseball player
- Carl Czerny (1791–1857), Austrian pianist
- Carl von Dardel (1880–1955), Swedish diplomat
- Carl Davis (American football, born 1992), American football player
- Carl Decaluwé (born 1960), Belgian politician
- Carl Dobkins Jr. (1941–2020), American singer and songwriter
- Carl Douglas (born 1942), Jamaican musician who wrote the disco song "Kung Fu Fighting"
- Carl E. Douglas (born 1955), American lawyer and member of the defense team during O.J. Simpson's murder trial
- Carl Earn (1921–2007), American tennis player
- Carl Edwards (born 1979), American racing driver
- Carl Edwards Jr. (born 1991), American baseball player
- Carl Eller (born 1942), American football player
- Carl Erskine (1926–2024), American baseball pitcher
- Carl Etelman (1900–1963), American football back and coach
- Carl L. Faingold, American neuroscientist and professor
- Carl G. Fisher (1874–1939), American entrepreneur
- Carl Fodor (born 1963), American football player
- Carl Fogarty (born 1965), English motorcycle racer
- Carl Frampton (born 1987), Northern Irish boxer
- Carl Froch (born 1977), British boxer
- Carl Garrigus (1931–1975), American football player
- Carl Friedrich Gauss (1777–1855), German mathematician, astronomer, geodesist, and physicist
- Carl Giammerese (born 1947), guitar player for American pop group The Buckinghams
- Carl Granderson (born 1996), American football player
- Carl Grubert (1911–1979), American cartoonist
- Carl Gutierrez (born 1941), American politician
- Carl Gunnarsson (born 1986), Swedish ice hockey player
- Carl August Hagberg (1810–1864), Swedish linguist
- Carl Hosticka, American politician and professor
- Carl Hubbell (1903–1988), American baseball player
- Carl Hunter (born 1965), bassist in The Farm
- Carl Icahn (born 1936), American businessman
- Carl Im Obersteg (1849–1926), Swiss politician and businessman
- Carl von In der Maur (1852–1913), Austrian aristocrat and Liechtenstein government official
- Carl Jenkinson (born 1992), English footballer
- Carl Johan Ståhlberg (1865–1952), Finnish jurist and the First President of the Republic of Finland
- Carl Joiner (1924–2000), American racing driver
- Carl Jung (1875–1961), Swiss psychiatrist and psychotherapist, founder of analytical psychology
- Carl Kaiser (1927–2010), Canadian ice hockey player
- Carl Karcher (1917–2008), American businessman, founder of the Carl's Jr. fast food restaurant chain
- Carl Kasell (1934–2018), American radio personality
- Carl Kline (psychiatrist) (1915–2005), Canadian psychiatrist and researcher
- Carl Ladendorff (1869–1947), German politician
- Carl Laemmle (1867–1939), founder of Universal Pictures
- Carl Laemmle Jr. (1908–1979), producer and businessman
- Carl Landry (born 1983), American basketball player
- Carl Lawson (American football) (born 1994), American football player
- Carl Lewis (born 1961), American track and field athlete
- Carl Limberger (born 1964), Australian tennis player
- Carl Lindner Jr. (1919–2011), American businessman
- Carl Linnaeus (1707–1778), Swedish biologist and physician
- Carl J. Luksic (1921–2009), American flying ace during World War II
- Carl Lumbly (born 1951), American actor
- Carl Lutz (1895–1975), Swiss vice-consul to Hungary during WWII, credited with saving over 62,000 Jews
- Carl Mann (1942–2020), American rockabilly singer
- Carl Menger (1840–1921), Austrian economist
- Carl Muckler (1941–2025), American politician from Missouri
- Carl Nickolas (born 2001), American taekwondo practitioner
- Carl Nicks (American football) (born 1985), American football player
- Carl Oglesby, American political activist, author, academic, and playwright
- Carl Oliver (born 1969), Bahamian sprinter and Olympic medallist
- Carl Ona-Embo (born 1989), Congolese basketball player
- Carl Orff (1895–1982) German composer
- Carl Palmer (born 1950), English Drummer
- Charles "Carl" Panzram (1891–1930), American serial killer
- Carl Anthony Payne II (born 1969), American actor
- Carl Perkins (1932–1998), American singer-songwriter
- Carl Philipp Emanuel Bach (1714–1788), German composer and musician
- Carl Posy, Israeli philosopher
- Carl Pursell (1932–2009), American politician
- Carl Reiner (1922–2020), American actor, comedian, and director
- Carl Glennis Roberts (1886–1950), American surgeon, civil rights activist
- Carl Robie (1945–2011), American swimmer
- Carl Robinson (born 1976), Welsh footballer
- Carl Rogers (1902–1987), American psychologist and psychotherapist
- Carl Hancock Rux, American poet, playwright, writer, singer
- Carl Sagan (1934–1996), American astronomer, cosmologist, astrophysicist
- Carl Sandburg (1878–1967), American poet, writer, editor
- Carl Sargeant (1968–2017), Welsh politician
- Carl Sentance (born 1961), Welsh Rock Singer
- Carl Schueler (born 1956), American race walker
- Carl L. Sitter (1922–2000), U.S. Marine Corps officer
- Carl Smith (American football) (born 1948), American football coach
- Carl Smith (musician) (1927–2010), American country music singer
- Carl Söderberg (born 1985), Swedish ice hockey player
- Carl Starfelt (born 1995), Swedish footballer
- Carl Stockdale (1874–1953), American actor
- Carl Heinrich Stratz (1858–1924), German-Russian gynecologist
- Carl Swartz (1858–1926), Swedish politician
- Carl Swartz (1920–2008), Swedish diplomat
- Carl "Alfalfa" Switzer (1927–1959), American actor and singer, best known as "Alfalfa" from the Our Gang (Little Rascals) comedy shorts
- Carl Olof Tallgren (1927–2024), Finnish politician and businessman
- Carl Thomas (singer) (born 1972), American R&B singer
- Carl Valeri (born 1984), Australian association football player
- Carl Van Doren (1885–1950), American critic
- Carl Vinson (1883–1981), American politician
- Carl Voss-Schrader (1880–1955), Finnish colonel, business director, lawyer and interior minister
- Carl Wachtmeister (disambiguation), several people
- Carl E. Walz (born 1955), American astronaut
- Carl Weathers (1948–2024), American actor and football player
- Carl "Charles" Webb, formerly unidentified man known as "Somerton Man"
- Carl Maria von Weber (1786–1826), German composer, conductor, virtuoso pianist, guitarist
- Carl Wieland (born 1950), Australian creationist
- Carl Wilson (1946–1998), American musician and lead guitar player for The Beach Boys
- Carl Wittrock (born 1966), Dutch composer and conductor
- Carl Yastrzemski (born 1939), American baseball player
- Carl Young (storm chaser) (1968–2013), American meteorologist and storm chaser
- Carl Zeiss (1816–1888), German scientific instrument maker, optician and businessman

=== As a family name ===
- Barry Carl (born 1950), American voice actor
- Christian Thomsen Carl (1676–1713), Danish navy officer. Middle name also given as Thomasen, Thomesen, or Thomasen.
- Fred Carl (politician), American politician
- Howie Carl (1938–2005), American basketball player
- Jann Carl (born 1960), American television host
- Konrad Carl (1930–2026), German trade union leader
- Max Carl (born 1950), American songwriter
- Renée Carl (1875–1954), French actress
- Steve Carl (born 1984), American mixed martial artist

=== As a stage name ===
- Carl Carl, stage name of Karl Andreas Bernbrunn (1787–1854), Polish-born actor and theatre director
- Margarethe Carl, stage name of Margarethe Bernbrunn (1788–1861), German soprano and actress
- Carl Wayne, stage name of Colin David Tooley (1943–2004), British singer and musician best known as a member of the Move

== Fictional characters ==
- Carl Brutananadilewski, a character from Aqua Teen Hunger Force
- Carl Carlson, a character from The Simpsons
- Carl Clover, a playable character in the Blazblue fighting game series
- Carl Conrad Coreander, a character in The Neverending Story
- Carl Denham, a character from the 1933 film King Kong and its 2005 remake
- Carl Elias, a recurring antagonist from the science fiction drama Person of Interest
- Carl Fredricksen, a character from Disney-Pixar's 2009 film Up
- Carl Gould, a minor character in the Arthur television show
- Carl Grimes, a notoriously elusive character from the comic/TV series The Walking Dead
- Carl Hamilton, a Swedish secret agent of novels by Jan Guillou
- Carl Hanratty, FBI agent in the 2002 film Catch Me If You Can
- Carl Johnson, a character in the Grand Theft Auto: San Andreas
- Carl Kolchak, a character from Kolchak: The Night Stalker'
- Carl Wheezer, a character from The Adventures of Jimmy Neutron, Boy Genius
- Carl Winslow, a character from the TV series Family Matters
- Carl, a character from the LitRPG series Dungeon Crawler Carl

== Derived surnames ==
There are several derivations of the surname Carl, most of them originating as "son of Carl":

- Carlsen
- Carlson
- Carlsson
- Carlton
- Karlsen
- Karlson
- Karlsson
- Karl (surname)

== See also ==
- Cari (name)
- Carle, surnames
- Carle (given name)
- Carli (given name)
- Carlo (name)
- Carla
- Carol (given name)
- Caroline (name)
- Carly
- Charl (name)
- Karl (given name)
- Karla (name)
