= Carlson (name) =

Name Segrid Carlson

- Pronunciation: (KARL sun)

Origin
- Meaning: Carl's son
- Region of origin: Scandinavian

Other names
- Variant form: Carlsen

Carlson
- Gender: Unisex

Origin
- Meaning: son of Carl

Carlson is a patronymic surname meaning "son of Carl"; it is rarely used as a given name and there are variations to its spelling.

Notable people with the name Carlson or its variant spellings include:

== Surname ==
- A. J. Carlson (1875–1956), Swedish-American physiologist
- Amy Carlson (born 1968), American actress
- Amy Carlson (religious leader) (1975–2021), American religious leader
- Anders Carlson (American football) (born 1998), American football player
- Arne Carlson (born 1934), Governor of the State of Minnesota
- Bille C. Carlson (1924-2013) American mathematician
- Branden Carlson (born 1999), American basketball player
- Catherine Carlson, Canadian judge in Manitoba
- Charlie Carlson (1943–2015), American uthor and film producer
- Chester Carlson (1906–1968), American physicist, inventor, and patent attorney
- Christian Thomsen Carl (1676–1713), also referred to as Carlson, Danish navy officer
- Christopher Carlson (born 1997), American rower
- Clifford Carlson (1894–1964), American, University of Pittsburgh basketball coach, physician for Carnegie Steel Company
- Dan Carlson (born 1970), American baseball player and coach
- Daniel Carlson (born 1995), American football player
- David Carlson (born 1952), American composer
- Dick Carlson (1941–2025), American journalist, diplomat, and lobbyist, father of Tucker
- Dosia Carlson (1930–2021), American minister
- Doug Carlson (1939–2013), American politician
- Dylan Carlson (baseball) (born 1998), American baseball player
- Dylan Carlson (musician) (born 1968), American, band member of band Earth
- Edward Carlson (1911–1990), American, Seattle civic leader
- Emily Carlson (born 1983), American, figure skater, broadcast journalist
- Eric Carlson (disambiguation)
- Evans Carlson (1896–1947), USMC leader in World War II
- Frank Carlson (1893–1987), American politician
- Fritz Carlson (1888–1952), Swedish mathematician
- George Alfred Carlson (1876–1926), American politician, governor of Colorado
- Grace Carlson (1906–1992), American Marxist politician
- Gretchen Carlson (born 1966), American television personality and former Miss America
- Gustaf Carlson, Count of Börringe and Lindholm (1646–1708), Swedish nobleman and military officer, son of King Charles X Gustav of Sweden
- Gustaf Carlson (footballer) (1894–1942), Swedish footballer
- JB Carlson (born 1974), American businessman and social entrepreneur
- Jeffrey Carlson (born 1975), American actor
- Joel D. Carlson (born 1960), American businessman and politician
- John Carlson (disambiguation), several people
- Karen Carlson (born 1945), American actress
- Kelly Carlson (born 1976), American actress
- Ken Carlson (born 1951), American politician
- Kevin Carlson (born 1962), American puppeteer and film special-effects expert
- Kyle & Lane Carlson (born 1978), American models
- Laura Carlson, American psychologist and academic administrator
- Len Carlson (1937–2006), Canadian voice actor
- Linda Carlson (1945–2021), American actress
- Lynda Carlson (born 1943), American statistician)
- Margaret Carlson, American journalist
- Margery C. Carlson (1892–1985), American botanist
- Molly Carlson (born 1998), Canadian high diver
- Nancy Carlson, American politician
- Oly Carlson, Australian politician
- Paul Carlson (1928–1964), American medical missionary
- Paulette Carlson (born 1952), American singer
- Ray Carlson (born 1948), South African rugby union player
- Richard Carlson (actor) (1912–1977), American actor, director and screenwriter
- Richard Carlson (author) (1961–2006), American author, psychotherapist, and motivational speaker
- Robert James Carlson (born 1944), American, Roman Catholic bishop
- Robert S. Carlson, American college sports coach
- Roy Carl Carlson (1937–2011), American politician
- Sam Carlson (born 1998), American baseball player
- Sannie Carlson (born 1970), Danish Eurodance singer better known as Whigfield
- Shawn Carlson (born 1960), American physicist, science writer, and a STEM educator
- Stephanie Carlson, American evolutionary ecologist
- Stephen Carlson (born 1996), American football player
- Tom Carlson (born 1941), Nebraska politician
- Tucker Carlson (born 1969), American political commentator
- Veronica Carlson (1944–2022), English model and actress
- William H. Carlson (1864–1937), American politician
- William S. Carlson (1905–1994), American explorer of Greenland and president of four universities

== Given name ==
- Carlson Gracie (1935–2006), Brazilian martial artist
- Carlson Manuel, Curaçaoan politician
- Carlson Reed (born 2002), American baseball player
- Carlson Young (born 1990), American actress
- Christy Carlson Romano (born 1984), American actress, dancer, author and singer

== See also ==
- Carlson (disambiguation)
- Carlon
- Carlsen (disambiguation)
- Carlson (disambiguation)
- Carlsson (disambiguation)
- Carlston (name)
- Karlson (disambiguation)
- Karlsson (disambiguation)
- Andrew Carlssin
- Jim Carlson (disambiguation)
