= Karlsson =

Karlsson is a Scandinavian patronymic surname meaning "son of Karl" or "Karl's son". It is one of the most common surnames in Sweden and has a number of alternative spellings. Apart from Karlsson, Carlsson is the most common spelling variation. Karlson and Carlson also exist, but are uncommon, as are Carlzon and Qarlsson (Annika Qarlsson). The parallel Danish-Norwegian forms are Karlsen and Carlsen.

The surname is also found in Iceland, where it is not strictly a surname, but a patronymic.

== Geographical distribution ==
As of 2014, 92.3% of all known bearers of the surname Karlsson were residents of Sweden, 2.8% of Finland and 1.2% of Norway.

In Sweden, the frequency of the surname was higher than national average (1:52) in the following counties:

1. Kalmar (1:21)
2. Kronoberg (1:24)
3. Östergötland (1:28)
4. Blekinge (1:29)
5. Örebro (1:32)
6. Jönköping (1:33)
7. Södermanland (1:33)
8. Värmland (1:37)
9. Halland (1:38)
10. Västra Götaland (1:44)

In Finland, the frequency of the surname was higher than national average (1:945) in the following regions:

1. Åland (1:25)
2. Southwest Finland (1:344)
3. Ostrobothnia (administrative region) (1:593)
4. Uusimaa (1:724)

== A ==
- Allan Karlsson (skier) (1911–1991), Swedish cross-country skier
- Allan Karlsson (footballer), Swedish former footballer
- Anders Carlsson (politician) (born 1951), Swedish social democratic politician
- Anders Karlsson (physicist) (born 1964), Swedish physicist
- Andreas Karlsson (born 1975), Swedish ice hockey player
- Ann-Ewa Karlsson (born 1955), Swedish Olympic high jumper
- Ann-Marie Karlsson (born 1968), Swedish cross-country skier
- Arne Karlsson (sailor) (born 1936), Swedish sailboat racer
- Arne Karlsson (sport shooter) (born 1946), Swedish sports shooter
- Arvid Carlsson (1923–2018), Swedish neuroscientist, Nobel Prize in 2000
- Åsa Karlsson (born 1973), Swedish politician
- Åsa-Britt Karlsson (born 1957), Swedish politician

== B ==
- Bert Karlsson (born 1945), Swedish record company manager and politician
- Bertil Karlsson (1919–2012), Swedish athlete
- Bo Karlsson (born 1949), Swedish football referee

== C ==
- Christoffer Karlsson (born 1988), Swedish football (soccer) player
- Conny Karlsson (shot putter) (born 1975), Finnish shot putter
- Conny Karlsson (footballer) (born 1953), Swedish football manager and former player

== D ==
- David Karlsson (bandy) (born 1981), Swedish bandy player
- David Lillieström Karlsson (born 1993), Swedish ice hockey player
- David Moberg Karlsson (born 1994), Swedish footballer

== E ==
- Einar Karlsson (1908–1980), Swedish wrestler
- Erik Karlsson (born 1990), Swedish ice hockey player
- Evie (singer) (full name Evie Karlsson, born 1956), U.S. Contemporary Christian music singer

== F ==
- Fred Karlsson (born 1946), Finnish professor of general linguistics

== G ==
- Gabriel Karlsson (born 1980), Swedish ice hockey player
- Göran Karlsson (born 1963), Swedish sledge hockey player
- Göran Karlsson (cyclist) (1937–2020), Swedish cyclist
- Gösta Karlsson, Swedish footballer
- Guðjón Davíð Karlsson (born 1980), Icelandic actor
- Gunnar Karlsson (1939–2019), Icelandic historian

== H ==
- Håkan Karlsson (born 1970), Swedish freestyle swimmer
- Hans Karlsson (born 1946), Swedish Social Democratic politician
- Herbert Carlsson (1896–1952), Swedish football (soccer) player
- Hjalmar Karlsson (1906–1992), Swedish sailboat racer
- Holger Karlsson (1935–2015), Swedish ski jumper

== I ==
- Ida Karlsson (born 2004), Swedish ice hockey player
- Ingvar Carlsson (born 1934), Swedish politician, Prime Minister of Sweden

== J ==
- Jan O. Karlsson (1939–2016), Swedish politician
- Janne Karlsson (ice hockey, born 1958), Swedish ice hockey player
- Janne Karlsson (ice hockey, born 1964), Swedish ice hockey coach
- Jens Karlsson (born 1982), Swedish ice hockey player
- Jonas Karlsson (born 1971), Swedish actor and author

== K ==
- Kent Karlsson (born 1945), Swedish football manager
- Kettil Karlsson (Vasa) (1433–1465), Swedish clergyman and regent of Sweden
- Kim Karlsson, Swedish ice hockey player
- Kjell-Erik Karlsson (born 1946), Swedish Left Party politician
- Kristian Karlsson (born 1991), Swedish table tennis player

== L ==
- Lars Karlsson (handballer) (born 1948), Swedish handball player
- Lars Erik Karlsson, Swedish darts player
- Lars Karlsson (ice hockey) (born 1960), Swedish ice hockey player
- Linus Karlsson (ice hockey) (born 1999), Swedish ice hockey player
- Linus Karlsson (table tennis) (born 1989), Swedish table tennis player
- Louise Karlsson (born 1974), Swedish swimmer

== M ==
- Magnus Karlsson (speedway rider) (born 1981), Swedish speedway rider
- Magnus Karlsson (bandy) (born 1984), Swedish bandy player
- Magnus Karlsson (musician) (born 1973), guitarist with heavy metal band Primal Fear
- Mandel Karlsson (since 1932), alias 91:an Karlsson, Swedish cartoon character in 91:an
- Maria Karlsson (footballer, born 1983), Swedish footballer
- Maria Karlsson (footballer, born 1985), Swedish footballer
- Markus Karlsson (footballer, born 1972), Swedish football (soccer) player for Djurgården
- Markus Karlsson (footballer, born 1979), Swedish football (soccer) player for Degerfors and AIK
- Markus Karlsson (footballer, born 2004), Swedish football (soccer) player for Hammarby
- Markus Karlsson (ice hockey) (born 1988), Swedish ice hockey defenceman
- Mikael Karlsson (born 1976, "Mikael Max" since 2003), Swedish speedway rider
- Mikael Karlsson, better known as Vigilante Carlstroem, guitarist of the Swedish rock band The Hives

== N ==
- Niklas Karlsson (born 1974), Swedish politician
- Nils Karlsson (1917–2012), known as Mora-Nisse, Swedish cross-country skier

== O ==
- Ove Karlsson (footballer) (1915–1982), Swedish footballer
- Ove Karlsson (ice hockey) (born 1950), Swedish ice hockey player
- Ove Karlsson (sports journalist) (1944–2021), Swedish sports journalist

== P ==
- Per Karlsson (born 1986), Swedish football (soccer) player
- Peter Karlsson (athlete) (born 1970), Swedish sprinter
- Peter Karlsson (footballer, born 1961), Swedish footballer
- Peter Karlsson (footballer, born 1973), Swedish footballer
- Peter Karlsson (ice hockey) (1966–1995), Swedish ice hockey player
- Peter Karlsson (speedway rider) (born 1969), Swedish motorcycle speedway rider
- Peter Karlsson (table tennis) (born 1969), Swedish table tennis player
- Peter Ingvar Karlsson (born 1976), Swedish motorcycle speedway rider

== R ==
- Rikke Karlsson (born 1965), Danish politician
- Robert Karlsson (born 1969), Swedish golfer
- Roger Karlsson (born 1968), Swedish murderer
- Runar Karlsson (born 1953), Swedish/Åland politician

== S ==
- Sebastian Karlsson (singer) (born 1985), Swedish singer and performer in Idol 2005
- Sebastian Karlsson (ice hockey), Swedish ice hockey player
- Simon Karlsson Adjei (born 1993), Swedish footballer
- Sonia Karlsson (born 1946), Swedish social democratic politician

== T ==
- Therese Karlsson (born 1972), Finnish singer and actor
- Thomas Karlsson (born 1972), Swedish writer and heavy metal lyricist

== U ==
- Ulrika Karlsson (politician) (born 1973), Swedish politician of the Moderate Party
- Ulrika Karlsson (footballer), Swedish footballer

== V ==
- Viktor Karlsson (born 1988), Swedish bandy player

== W ==
- William Karlsson (born 1993), Swedish ice hockey player
- William Karlsson (racing driver) (born 2005), Swedish racing driver
