= Peter Karlsson =

Peter Karlsson may refer to:

- Peter Karlsson (athlete) (born 1970), Swedish sprinter
- Peter Karlsson (footballer, born 1961), Swedish footballer
- Peter Karlsson (footballer, born 1973), Swedish footballer
- Peter Karlsson (ice hockey) (1966–1995), Swedish ice hockey player
- Peter Karlsson (speedway rider) (born 1969), Swedish motorcycle speedway rider
- Peter Karlsson (table tennis) (born 1969), Swedish table tennis player
- Peter Ingvar Karlsson (born 1976), Swedish motorcycle speedway rider
