= Carlton (given name) =

Carlton is a masculine given name, meaning "free peasant settlement" or "from the town of the free men (see Carl)". Prominent individuals with this name include:

== People ==
- Carlton B. Ardery Jr. (died 1965), American test pilot
- Carlton Barrett (1950–1987), Jamaican reggae drummer and percussion player; member of Bob Marley and The Wailers
- Carlton W. Barrett (1919–1986), US Army soldier and Medal of Honor recipient
- Carlton "Bub" Carrington (born 2005), American basketball player
- Carlton Cole (born 1983), English footballer
- Carlton Cuse (born 1959), American screenwriter and producer
- Carlton Davis (born 1996), American football player
- Carlton "Santa" Davis (born 1953), Jamaican reggae drummer; member of The Aggrovators
- Carlton Fairweather (1961–2025), English footballer
- Carlton Fisk (born 1947), professional baseball player (1969, 1971–1993)
- Carlton Foster (1826–1901), American politician
- Carlton Gary (1950–2018), American serial killer and rapist
- Cookie Gilchrist (1935–2011), American football player
- Carlton Haselrig (1966–2020), American wrestler and National Football League player
- Carlton Higbie (born 1983), author and former Navy SEAL
- Carlton Johnson (born 1969), American football player
- Carlton Martial (born 1999), American football player
- Carlton Morris (born 1995), English football player
- Carlton Palmer (born 1965), English international football player
- Carlton Skinner (1913–2004), Governor of Guam

== Fictional characters ==
- Carlton Banks, from the American television series The Fresh Prince of Bel-Air
- Carlton "Carl" Carlson, from the animated television series The Simpsons
- Carlton Lassiter, from the American television series Psych
- Carlton the doorman, on the American television show Rhoda and Carlton Your Doorman
- Carlton "Carl" Wheezer, a character from The Adventures of Jimmy Neutron, Boy Genius
- Carlton Drake, a antagonist character from Venom

== See also ==
- Carlton (disambiguation)
- Carlton (given name)
- Carlton (surname)
- Carlson
- Carlston
- Carlon
- Charlton
- Colton
