= Carlsson =

Carlsson is a Swedish patronymic surname meaning "son of Carl" or "Carl’s son". Cognates include Carlson and Karlsson. The parallel Danish-Norwegian forms are Karlsen and Carlsen.

Notable people with the surname include:

- Agnes Carlsson, 2005 Idol winner
- Albertina Carlsson (1848–1930) Swedish zoologist
- Alice Carlsson (born 1995), Swedish association footballer
- Allan Carlsson (boxer), Swedish boxer
- Allan Carlsson (cyclist) (1929–1953), Swedish cyclist
- Andreas Carlsson, Swedish music producer, composer, and pop songwriter
- Arvid Carlsson, famous neuroscientist
- Bernt Carlsson (1938–1988), Swedish politician, United Nations Commissioner for Namibia
- Christoffer Carlsson (born 1989), Swedish football player
- Christoffer Carlsson (writer) (born 1986), Swedish criminologist and writer
- Clas-Göran Carlsson (born 1962), Swedish politician
- Erik Carlsson (1929–2015), Swedish rally driver
- Gabriel Carlsson (born 1997), Swedish ice hockey player
- Göran Carlsson (born 1963), Swedish curler
- Gunilla Carlsson (born 1963), Swedish politician
- Henry Carlsson, Swedish footballer
- Ingvar Carlsson (born 1934), Swedish politician, Prime Minister of Sweden (1986–1991; 1994–1996)
- Janne Carlsson, Swedish film and television actor
- Johan Carlsson (footballer)
- Johan Carlsson (tennis), former professional tennis player
- Johan Gustaf von Carlsson (1743–1801), Swedish statesman and naturalist
- Kent Carlsson, former tennis player
- Leo Carlsson (born 2004), Swedish ice hockey player
- Magnus Carlsson (disambiguation), multiple people
- Márcio Carlsson, former professional tennis player
- Maria Carlsson (born 1937), German translator
- Mia Carlsson (born 1990), Swedish soccer player
- Nicklas Carlsson, professional footballer
- Pat Moss-Carlsson (1934–2008), English rally driver
- Peter Carlsson, former professional tennis player
- Pontus Carlsson (born 1982), Swedish chess grandmaster
- Robin Carlsson (Robyn) (born 1979), Swedish musician
- Rose-Marie Carlsson (born 1954), Swedish politician
- Sven Carlsson (1915–1995), Swedish curler
- Tobias Carlsson (footballer, born 1975), retired Swedish footballer

== See also ==
- Carlsson (car company), German car tuning manufacturer
- Carlsen (disambiguation)
- Carlson (disambiguation)
- Carlston (name)
- Karlson (disambiguation)
- Karlsson (disambiguation)
