= Garrigus =

Garrigus is a surname. Notable people with the surname include:

- Alice Belle Garrigus (1858–1949), American religious figure
- Carl Garrigus (1931–1975), American football player
- Charles B. Garrigus (1914–2000), American poet
- Harry L. Garrigus (1876–1968), American animal scientist and educator
- Robert Garrigus (born 1977), American golfer
- Thomas Garrigus (1946–2006), American athlete

== See also ==
- Garrigues (disambiguation)
- Fred Garrigus Holloway (1898–1988), American educator
