= Eric Karlsson =

Eric Karlsson, or variations, may refer to:

- Erik Lennart Karlsson (1918-2001), Swedish banker
- Eric Carlsén (born 1982), Swedish curler
- Erik Carlsen (1911–1999), Danish equestrian
- Eric Carlson (musician) (born 1958), American heavy metal guitarist
- Eric Carlson (architect) (born 1963), American architect
- Erik Carlsson (1929–2015), Swedish rally driver
- Erik Carlsson (weightlifter) (1893–1981), Swedish weightlifter
- Eric Karlsson (footballer), member of the Swedish national football team in 1946; see 1946–47 in Swedish football
- Erik Karlsson (born 1990), Swedish professional ice hockey defenceman playing in the NHL
- Erik Karlsson (ice hockey, born 1994), Swedish professional ice hockey forward

== See also ==
- Erik Carlsson Sjöblad (1647–1725), Swedish governor, admiral, and baron
- Eric Carlson Three-Decker, an historic house in Worcester, Massachusetts
