= Carl Kline =

Carl Kline may refer to:

- Carl Kline (psychiatrist) (1915–2005), Canadian psychiatrist and researcher
- Carl Kline (White House official), United States White House official
