= Karlsen =

- Pronunciation: karl-sen

Origin
- Origin: Old German
- Meaning: "son of Karl"

Other names
- Variant forms: Karlson, Karlsson

Karlsen is a Danish-Norwegian patronymic surname meaning "son of Karl" (\k(a)-rl\), an Old German given name. The form Carlsen is cognate. The parallel Swedish forms are Karlsson and Carlsson. People with the surname include:

- Alexandria Karlsen (born 1978), American model, actress and author
- Atle Karlsen (keyboardist) (?-), keyboardist of the Norwegian Rock band DumDum Boys
- Emil Karlsen (born 1997), Norwegian singer-songwriter
- Geir Karlsen (born 1948), Norwegian footballer
- Geir Karlsen (born 1965), Norwegian CEO
- Johan Sigurd Karlsen (1894–1967), Norwegian politician
- Kari Karlsen (born 1952), Norwegian high jumper
- Karl Henry Karlsen (1893–1979), Norwegian politician
- Morten Karlsen (born 1979), Danish footballer
- Svend Karlsen (born 1967), Norwegian strongman
- Tor Ottar Karlsen (born 1950), Norwegian politician

== See also ==
- Styrmand Karlsen, a 1958 Danish film
