= Charlton (given name) =

- Gender: Male
- Language: Old English

Origin
- Meaning: "town of the free men"

Other names
- Variant form: Carlton

Charlton is an English-language masculine given name that may refer to:

- Charlton W. Billingslea (died 1889), American politician and judge
- Charlton Brooker (born 1971), English satirist commonly known as Charlie Brooker
- Charlton Brosius (1876–1956), American Army officer
- Charlton Eagle (born 1963), Australian tennis player
- Charlton Ehizuelen (born 1953), Nigerian track and field athlete
- Charlton Harrison (1881–1951), British civil engineer
- Charlton Heston (1923–2008), American actor
- Charlton Hill (born 1975), Australian musician
- Charlton Howard (born 2003), Australian rapper, singer, and songwriter, known professionally as the Kid Laroi
- Charlton Hunt (1801–1836), American lawyer and politician
- Charlton Jimerson (born 1979), American baseball player
- Charlton Keith (born 1982), American football linebacker
- Charlton Laird (1901–1984), American linguist
- Charlton Lane (1836–1892), English amateur cricketer known as C. G. Lane
- Charlton Thomas Lewis (1834–1904), American lawyer and author
- Charlton Mashumba (born 1992), Zimbabwean footballer
- Charlton Monypenny (1867–1947), British businessman and Laird
- Charlton Nesbit (1775–1838), English wood engraver
- Charlton Nyirenda (born 1988), Malawian swimmer
- Charlton Ogburn (1911–1998), American journalist and author
- Charlton Rafaela (born 1977), Antillean sprinter
- Charlton Spinks (1877–1959), British Army officer
- Charlton W. Tebeau (1904–2000), American historian
- Charlton Templeman Speer (1859–1921), English composer and spiritualist
- Charlton Vicento (born 1991), Dutch footballer
- Charlton Wollaston (1733–1764), English medical doctor
- Charlton Wong (born 1979), Hong Kong football referee
- Charlton Young (born 1971), American college basketball assistant coach

== See also ==
- Charlton (surname)
- Carlton, given name
- Charlie
- Chilton, given name
- Colton, given name
