= Carlson =

Carlson may refer to:

- Carlson (name), people with the given name or surname
- Carlson Companies, American conglomerate
  - CWT, subsidiary
  - Radisson Hotel Group, former subsidiary formerly known as Carlson Rezidor
- Carlson Inlet, Antarctica
- Carlson Library, University of Rochester, New York, USA
- Carlson Park, Culver City, California, USA
- Carlson's patrol, USMC operation during Guadalcanal campaign
- Carlson Stadium, Decorah, Iowa, USA
- Carlson's theorem, uniqueness theorem about a summable expansion of an analytic function
- Chester County G. O. Carlson Airport, Coatesville, Pennsylvania, USA
- Stromberg-Carlson, American telecommunications equipment manufacturing company

== See also ==
- Carleson, a surname
- Carlsen (disambiguation)
- Carlsson (disambiguation)
- Karlson (disambiguation)
- Karlsson (disambiguation)
