= Magnus Karlsson =

Magnus Karlsson may refer to:

- Magnus Karlsson (guitarist) (born 1973), Swedish musician
- Magnus Karlsson (speedway rider) (born 1981), Swedish speedway rider
- Magnus Karlsson (bandy) (born 1984), Swedish bandy player

== See also ==
- Magnus Carlsson (disambiguation)
- Magnus Carlsen, Norwegian chess player
