= List of presidential trips made by Bill Clinton (1993) =

This is a list of presidential trips made by Bill Clinton during 1993, the first year of his presidency as the 42nd president of the United States. International trips are highlighted in blue.

This list excludes trips made within Washington, D.C., the U.S. federal capital in which the White House, the official residence and principal workplace of the president, is located. It also excludes the capital's immediate surroundings in Maryland and Virginia, such as Andrews Air Force Base in Maryland, where the president typically boards Air Force One for all trips outside the area. Also excluded are trips to Camp David, the country residence of the president.

== January ==
No trips made

== February ==
State or country	Areas visited	Dates	Details
Michigan	Southfield	February 10	Participated in a townhall meeting at WXYZ-TV studios.
Missouri	St. Louis	February 18	Spoke about his economic policy at St. Louis Union Station.
Ohio	Chillicothe	February 18–19	Stayed at the Comfort Inn. Took questions on his economic policy at Chillicothe High School.
New York	Hyde Park	February 19	Spoke about his economic policy at Haviland Middle School. Toured the Franklin D. Roosevelt Presidential Library and Museum.
California	Santa Monica, Los Angeles, San Jose, Los Gatos, Mountain View	February 21–22	Spoke about his economic policy at Santa Monica College. Met with CEOs of California companies at a dinner at a private residence in Los Gatos. Toured Silicon Graphics headquarters in Mountain View.
Washington	Everett	February 22	Spoke to workers and met with airline industry executives at the Boeing Everett Factory.

== March ==
State or country	Areas visited	Dates	Details
New Jersey	New Brunswick	March 1	Took questions at the New Brunswick Public Schools Adult Learning Center. Spoke about national service at Rutgers University–New Brunswick.
Maryland	Linthicum	March 11	Toured the Westinghouse Electronic Systems plant.
Atlantic Ocean		March 12	Visited the USS Theodore Roosevelt as it was beginning its deployment, about 70 miles off the coast of Norfolk, Virginia.
Georgia	Atlanta	March 19	Visited the Downtown Child Development Center. Addressed business leaders at AmericasMart.
Arkansas	Little Rock	March 21–22	Visited his father-in-law Hugh Rodham at St. Vincent's Hospital.
Arkansas	Little Rock	March 28–30	Visited Hugh Rodham at St. Vincent's Hospital.

== April ==
State or country	Areas visited	Dates	Details
Maryland	Annapolis	April 1	Addressed midshipmen and took questions from the American Society of Newspaper Editors at the United States Naval Academy's Dahlgren Hall.
Oregon	Portland	April 2–3	Addressed the Forest Conference at the Oregon Convention Center. Stayed at the Benson Hotel.
Canada	Vancouver	April 3–4	Attended Summit Meeting with Russian president Boris Yeltsin. Also met with Prime Minister Brian Mulroney.
Maryland	Baltimore	April 5	Threw out the ceremonial first pitch on Opening Day of Major League Baseball at Oriole Park at Camden Yards.
Arkansas	Little Rock	April 8–10	Attended a memorial service for his father-in-law Hugh Rodham, who died on April 7, at First United Methodist Church.
Pennsylvania	Scranton	April 10	Attended the funeral of Hugh Rodham at Court Street Methodist Church.
Pennsylvania	Pittsburgh	April 17	Spoke at Pittsburgh International Airport, urging the passage of his stimulus plan.
Virginia	Williamsburg, Jamestown	April 24–25	Attended the Senate Democrats Conference at Kingsmill Resort. Toured Historic Jamestown.
Massachusetts	Boston	April 25	Addressed the Newspaper Association of America at the Marriott Copley Place Hotel.
Louisiana	New Orleans	April 30	Spoke about national service at Benjamin Franklin High School and at the University of New Orleans.

== May ==
State or country	Areas visited	Dates	Details
Ohio	Cleveland	May 10	Spoke at the Galleria at Erieview mall food court. Took questions from the City Club of Cleveland at The Statler.
Illinois	Bensenville, Chicago	May 10–11	Spoke at Fenton High School. Visited Myron and Phil's restaurant and stayed at the Westin Hotel.
New York	New York	May 12	Spoke at Cooper Union. Held a press conference at the Fordham University School of Law. Attended a DNC fundraising gala at Lincoln Center.
New York	New York	May 15	Attended a birthday dinner for Madeleine Albright at the Waldorf Astoria New York.
New Mexico	Los Alamos	May 17	Toured Los Alamos National Laboratory.
California	San Diego, Coronado, Los Angeles	May 17–18	Participated in a townhall meeting at KGTV studios. Stayed at the Hotel del Coronado. Took questions at Los Angeles Valley College, where he also endorsed Michael Woo in the 1993 Los Angeles mayoral election. Spoke at The Playground, a sporting goods store in South Central Los Angeles.
New Hampshire	Stratham	May 22	Gave the commencement address at New Hampshire Technical College.
Pennsylvania	Philadelphia	May 28	Spoke at Philadelphia City Hall. Attended fundraising receptions at the Wyndham Franklin Plaza Hotel and the Pyramid Club.
New York	West Point	May 29	Gave the commencement address at the United States Military Academy's Michie Stadium.

== June ==
State or country	Areas visited	Dates	Details
Wisconsin	Milwaukee	June 1	Spoke at the MECCA Arena, and at Langer's Pharmacy in Bay View.
Maryland	Frederick	June 3	Toured the Fredericktowne Village riverwalk area.
Massachusetts	Boston	June 19	Gave the commencement address at Northeastern University.
Maine	Portland	June 19	Spoke at Deering Oaks Park.

== July ==
State or country	Areas visited	Dates	Details
Pennsylvania	Philadelphia	July 4	Celebrated Independence Day at Independence Hall, and rang the Liberty Bell.
Iowa	Eldridge	July 4	Surveyed damage from the Great Flood of 1993.
California	San Francisco	July 4–5	Addressed the National Education Association convention at the Moscone Center.
Japan	Tokyo	July 6–10	Attended the 19th G7 summit. Met with Russian President Boris Yeltsin.
South Korea	Seoul	July 10–11	Met with President Kim Young-sam. Addressed the South Korean National Assembly. Visited U.S. military personnel.
Hawaii	Honolulu	July 11–13	Visited the USS Arizona Memorial. Stayed at the Kahala Hilton.
Iowa	Des Moines	July 13–14	Surveyed damage from the Great Flood of 1993 at the Hy-Vee store at Southridge Mall. Interviewed at WHO studios.
Missouri	Arnold	July 17	Participated in a roundtable discussion on flood relief at Fox Senior High School.
Arkansas	Little Rock	July 17–18	Visited his mother, Virginia Clinton Kelley. Stayed at the home of White House Chief of Staff Mack McLarty.
Arkansas	Little Rock, Hope	July 23–24	Attended the funeral of Deputy White House Counsel Vince Foster at the Cathedral of St. Andrew, and his burial at Memory Gardens Cemetery in Hope.
Illinois	Chicago	July 26	Attended the Conference on the Future of the American Workplace at the Sheraton Chicago.

== August ==
State or country	Areas visited	Dates	Details
West Virginia	Charleston	August 9	Spoke at the West Virginia State Capitol.
Missouri	Bridgeton	August 12	Signed the Emergency Supplemental Appropriations for Relief From the Major, Widespread Flooding in the Midwest Act into law in a ceremony at the Henry VIII Hotel.
Colorado	Denver	August 12	Met with Pope John Paul II, who was attending World Youth Day 1993 at Regis University.
California	Oakland, Alameda	August 12–13	Spoke at Naval Air Station Alameda and the Fleet and Industrial Supply Center, Oakland. Met with the East Bay Conversion and Reinvestment Commission.
Colorado	Denver, Vail	August 13–16	Signed the Colorado Wilderness Act of 1993 into law at Stapleton International Airport. Weekend vacation in Vail.
Oklahoma	Tulsa	August 16	Attended the National Governors Association conference at the Tulsa Convention Center.
Arkansas	Springdale	August 16–18	Stayed at the home of James Blair on the shore of Beaver Lake.
Massachusetts	Martha's Vineyard	August 19–29	Summer vacation.

== September ==
State or country	Areas visited	Dates	Details
Delaware	Georgetown	September 3	Toured the Opportunity Skyway School-to-Work Program.
Florida	Miami, Florida City, Homestead, Cutler Ridge	September 5–6	Surveyed damage from Hurricane Andrew.
Ohio	Cleveland	September 9	Spoke at the Church Square Shopping Center.
California	Sunnyvale	September 10	Toured a local nonprofit, the North Valley Job Training Partnership. Visited the Sunnyvale Community Center.
Texas	Houston	September 10–11	Stayed at the Wyndham Warwick Hotel. Spoke at an event presenting the results of the National Performance Review at the Texas Surplus Property Agency office.
Louisiana	New Orleans	September 15	Took questions about NAFTA at the Nashville Avenue Wharf.
Florida	Tampa, St. Petersburg	September 23–24	Participated in a townhall meeting on health care reform that was broadcast on Nightline at the Straz Center for the Performing Arts. Stayed at The Don CeSar hotel. Spoke at the Pinellas Marine Institute.
New York	New York	September 26–27	Spoke at the Future Diner in Fresh Meadows, Queens. Attended a Latin American reception at the Waldorf Astoria, where he stayed overnight. Campaigned for Mayor David Dinkins at Edgar Bronfman Jr.'s home and at the Sheraton New York Hotel and Towers. Addressed the opening session of the 48th United Nations General Assembly.

== October ==
State or country	Areas visited	Dates	Details
California	Sacramento, San Francisco, Los Angeles, Beverly Hills, Culver City	October 3–5	Participated in a townhall meeting at KCRA-TV studios. Stayed at the Fairmont San Francisco. Addressed the AFL-CIO convention at the Hilton San Francisco Union Square. Attended a DCCC fundraiser at The Beverly Hilton. Took questions from AARP members at Dr. Paul Carlson Park.
New Jersey	New Brunswick	October 8	Spoke at Robert Wood Johnson University Hospital.
Connecticut	New Haven	October 9	Attended his 20th class reunion at the Yale University School of Law.
North Carolina	Chapel Hill	October 12	Attended a celebration of the 200th anniversary of the University of North Carolina at Chapel Hill.
Maryland	Baltimore	October 28	Addressed the medical community at Johns Hopkins University's Newton White Athletic Center.
New York	New York	October 28	Campaigned for Mayor David Dinkins at the IBEW Electric Industry Center. Attended the Wall Street Journal second annual conference on the Americas at the Waldorf Astoria.
Massachusetts	Boston	October 28–29	Stayed at the Boston Park Plaza. Dedicated the expanded John F. Kennedy Presidential Library and Museum. Toured a Gillette factory, where he spoke to workers about NAFTA.

== November ==
State or country	Areas visited	Dates	Details
Pennsylvania	Ambridge	November 3	Presented a copy of Health Security: The President's Report to the American People to the Laughlin Memorial Library. Spoke at Ambridge Area High School.
Kentucky	Lexington	November 4	Toured a Lexmark laser printer factory, where he spoke to workers about NAFTA.
West Virginia	Martinsburg	November 11	Commemorated Veterans Day by visiting Martinsburg VA Medical Center, where he presented medals and certificates to four World War I veterans.
Tennessee	Memphis	November 13	Addressed to the Annual Convention of the Church of God in Christ at Mason Temple. Spoke at Olivet Baptist Church.
Washington	Seattle	November 18–20	Attended the APEC summit at Tillicum Village Lodge. Other venues for APEC meetings Clinton attended included the Westin Seattle, the Rainier Club, and the Seattle Art Museum.
California	San Francisco, Pasadena, Los Angeles	November 20–21	Attended a reception for Senator Dianne Feinstein at the Fairmont San Francisco. Visited Pasadena Presbyterian Church, where he met with residents that had lost their homes in the Kinneloa Fire the previous month. Spoke at Our Lady Help of Christians School.

== December ==
State or country	Areas visited	Dates	Details
New Mexico	Bernalillo, Albuquerque	December 3	Took questions on health care at El Pueblo Health Services Center. Attended a Democratic fundraiser at Albuquerque Convention Center.
California	Beverly Hills, Los Angeles	December 3–5	Stayed at the Beverly Hilton. Toured the Rocketdyne factory in Canoga Park. Attended DNC fundraisers at the Creative Artists Agency headquarters and Marvin Davis' home.
Pennsylvania	Philadelphia	December 13	Addressed a conference on entitlement reform at Bryn Mawr College.
New York	New York	December 13	Visited Rockefeller Center. Attended a fundraising dinner for Senator Daniel Patrick Moynihan at the Waldorf Astoria, where he also met with the three people who stopped the Long Island Rail Road gunman six days earlier.
Maryland	Cambridge	December 27	Went duck hunting at Tieder Farm.
Arkansas	Hot Springs, Little Rock, Fayetteville	December 27–29	Stayed with his mother, Virginia Clinton Kelley. Attended an Arkansas Razorbacks basketball game at Bud Walton Arena.
South Carolina	Hilton Head	December 29–January 2	Holiday vacation. Attended the Renaissance Weekend New Year's gathering.
