= Carlston (name) =

Carlston is a surname and given name.

== Surname ==
- Doug Carlston (born 1947), software publisher
- Erin G. Carlston (born 1962), New Zealand academic
- Pete Carlston (1911–1992), athletic coach and military officer

== Given name ==
- Carlston Harris (born 1987), Guyanese mixed martial artist

== See also ==
- Carleton (given name)
- Carlson (name)
- Carlston (disambiguation)
- Carlton (name)
- Carlsson
- Carlsten (name)
- Charleston (name)
