= Carlsen =

Origin
- Meaning: Carl's son
- Region of origin: Scandinavia

Other names
- Variant forms: Karlsen, Carlson, Carlsson and Karlsson

Carlsen is a Danish-Norwegian patronymic surname meaning "son of Carl". The form Karlsen is cognate. The parallel Swedish forms are Carlsson and Karlsson.

Notable people with the surname include:

- Agnete Carlsen (born 1971), Norwegian footballer, world champion and Olympic medalist
- Audun Carlsen, Norwegian escort and model involved in an incident with the recording artist Boy George in 2007
- Christian Thomsen Carl, also referred to as Carlsen (1676–1713), Danish navy officer
- Dale Carlsen, American businessman
- Dines Carlsen (1901–1966), American painter
- Emil Carlsen (1853–1932), American painter
- Eric Carlsén (born 1982), Swedish curler
- Franziska Carlsen (1817–1876), Danish writer
- Gary Carlsen (born 1945), American discus thrower
- Henrik Carlsen (born 1959), Danish composer
- Henrik Kurt Carlsen (1914–1989), Danish sea captain
- Kenneth Carlsen (born 1973), Danish tennis player
- Kirsten Carlsen (born 1938), Danish cross-country skier
- Magnus Carlsen (born 1990), Norwegian chess grandmaster and former World Champion
- Nils Carlsén (born 1985), Swedish curler
- Olav Sigurd Carlsen (1930–2013), Norwegian politician
- Per Carlsén (born 1960), Swedish curler
- Reidar Carlsen (1908–1987), Norwegian politician

== See also ==
- Carlsen (disambiguation)
- Carlson (disambiguation)
- Carlson (name)
- Carlsten (name)
- Karlsen (surname)
