= Garrigues =

Garrigues may refer to:

- Garrigues, Hérault, a commune in the Hérault department of France
- Garrigues-Sainte-Eulalie, a commune in the Gard department of France
- Garrigues, Tarn, a commune in the Tarn department of France
- Garrigues (comarca), a county in Catalonia, Spain
- Garrigues (law firm), a law firm headquartered in Madrid, Spain

== People ==
- Anabel Medina Garrigues, Spanish professional tennis player
- Chantal Garrigues (1944-2018), French actress
- Charles Harris Garrigues (1903–1974), California journalist
- Charlotte Garrigue (1850–1923), wife of Tomáš Garrigue Masaryk, the first president of Czechoslovakia
- Daniel Garrigue (born 1948), member of the National Assembly of France
- Henry Jacques Garrigues (1831–1912), American doctor
- Jean Garrigue (1912–1972), American poet
- Malvina Garrigues (Schnorr von Carolsfeld) (1825–1904), Danish-German operatic soprano
- Rémi Garrigue (born 2004), French fencer
- Richard Garrigues, naturalist, writer and videographer, author of The Birds of Costa Rica
- Tomáš Garrigue Masaryk (1850-1937), first president of Czechoslovakia

== See also ==
- Garrigue, a type of vegetation found on limestone soils around the Mediterranean Basin
