= JB Carlson =

American businessman, founder, Chief Executive, Chairman and Executive Director

- JB Carlson, September 2009
- Born: Jason C. Bolf; February 16, 1974 (age 52); Indiana, U.S.
- Education: Babson College, Wichita State, Ball State University, Indiana University
- Occupations: Founder, businessman, Chairman, Chief Executive,
- Years active: 1993
- Website: jbcarlsonmain.worldsecuresystems.com

JB Carlson (born February 1974) is an American businessman, founder, chief executive officer, (CEO), social entrepreneur and executive director. Carlson founded Carlson Imperatives NGO, Carlson Control Systems, Inc., CarlsonEAR LLC., Carlson Corporation in 1993 (Indianapolis, Indiana), JB Carlson Corporation (Indianapolis) Pacesetter Finishing Inc. and Carlson Media Group, Inc. in 2001 (Delaware).

== Early life ==
Carlson is a lifetime member of the National Eagle Scout Association, earned his "Ad Altare Dei" (to the altar of God) and awarded an honorary Indian named "Fast White-Tailed Running Deer" from a tribe in the Ozarks in recognition of Carlson's economic contributions and service projects he conducted. Carlson has remarked his early influences were T.P. Donovan, Van Smith, Beurt SerVaas, Richard Thalheimer and Neil Balter.

During high school, Carlson worked for Ross Perot's independent presidential campaign in 1992.

== Early career ==
JB Carlson has appeared in three New York Times bestselling books, Vanity Fair, most recently, "The Liar's Ball: The Extraordinary Saga of How One Building Broke the World's Toughest Tycoons" which characterized Carlson as an "opponent to Donald Trump."

Whilst a freshman in college, JB Carlson started The Carlson Corporation and negotiated a contract between a national retailer, The Sharper Image and a large manufacturer of portable soft-sided spas catering consumers residing in apartments, condos and second homes, creating a new distribution channel for the product. Later, Carlson sold a unique security apparatus he rebranded as "The Fortress". "The Fortress" was sold primarily through radio commercials Carlson produced. Producing these radio commercials was his first exposure to the media business.

== Carlson Imperatives NGO ==
Carlson Imperatives NGO, is a non-governmental organization (NGO) focusing on imperatives identified by Carlson to better and serve the United Nations and other intergovernmental organizations. Some Carlson Imperatives include nuclear testing via ratifying the Comprehensive Nuclear-Test-Ban Treaty, climate change, climate change mitigation, Imperatives regarding water (water pressure, water purity, and water volume), fire extinguisher methods using sound, women's rights and aligning private and public sector interests to meet Sustainable Development Goals (SDGs) created by the United Nations through several methods including B Corporation (certification) and special accounting methods.

== Carlson Media Technology ==
Since then, Carlson led teams that did business with Procter & Gamble, Kimberly Clark, Sprite Remix, Coca-Cola, Land O'Lakes, Purina, Anheuser Busch, The Sharper Image, Marsh Supermarket, and Wal-Mart.

Carlson ended his relationship with Wal-Mart when Tom Coughlin, then vice-chairman of Wal-Mart and former confidant of Sam Walton, was arrested. Carlson's chief financial officer, David W. Elder, had formerly worked for Sam Walton's daughter, Alice Walton..

During Carlson's tenure Carlson's business model and value proposition included reducing fraud and terrorism financing from conditional bearer instruments/coupons. Carlson participated in and was partially responsible for saving CPGs over $450,000,000 in coupon fraud, including coupon fraud that financed some of the world's largest terrorist events, including the first World Trade Center bombing and $250M from an industry insider, International Outsourcing Services.

=== Federal litigation ===
American International Group, Inc. (AIG), through its subsidiary American General Life, Inc. (AGL), on December 31, 2008 sued an insurance trust owned by one of Carlson's companies to contest a $15 million claim in federal district court (United States District Court for the Southern District of Indiana). The AIG lawsuit alleged that Carlson secured a life insurance policy without possessing the required insurable interest so that he, his company and trusts could later profit from selling the policy on the secondary market. This is called stranger-originated life insurance (SOLI). AIG alleged that the policy was nothing more than a wagering contract which is void ab initio. Count one requested a declaratory judgment for rescission and/or voiding of the policy based on lack of insurable interest.

=== Carlson response ===
Carlson responded to AIG, claiming that the "policy was a 'key man' policy to protect his business against the loss of Tomlinson's (Carlson's insured director) contributions to the success of his business as a director." Therefore, Carlson contended that he and his business had an insurable interest in his director's life and that, even if there was not an insurable interest, AIG's own two-year contestability provided that: “Except as stated below, we cannot contest this policy after it has been in force during the insured’s lifetime for 2 years from the date of issue.” Carlson continued, "AIG did not raise any contentions about fraud or misrepresentation in the application process until after Germaine Tomlinson's death and more than two years after the Policy's date of issue." Premiums had been paid and were up to date. He further claimed that Indiana state law prevented AIG from contesting the claim. Carlson asserted, "like other states, Indiana expressly authorized by corporations to insure the lives of its directors." Indiana Code § 27-1-12-17 authorizes corporations to insure the lives of its directors, officers, agents and employees."

=== Countersuit ===
JB Carlson countersued AIG. Count I of Carlson's counter complaint was for breach of contract and count II was for bad faith. Carlson provided emails from the life insurance agent, Geoffrey A. VanderPal, encouraging Carlson to sell the policy. However, Carlson never filled out an application to sell the policy.

=== Judge's ruling ===
Judge Sarah Evans Barker found only circumstantial evidence against Carlson, but significant and strong evidence that Tomlinson served as an active member of Carlson's board of directors since 2002 and that Tomlinson attended business meetings and introduced Carlson to a multitude of people who "possessed sufficient financial resources" to qualify them to become his investors, lenders and clients. Judge Barker wrote that some of Carlson's other board members testified in depositions that Tomlinson was on the Board and court documents stated that Germaine Tomlinson had told others that she was a board member of his company. Board meeting minutes also mentioned Tomlinson's participation in the meetings. Judge Barker stated that Tomlinson controlled the trust with exclusive power to change the beneficial interest at any point and she chose not to make any changes to the trusts named beneficiaries and therefore it was doubtful that Carlson could have participated in wagering.

Judge Barker ruled that both AIG and Carlson's positions and facts did not meet the standard for Summary Judgment and ordered the case to a jury trial. Carlson's case received global media coverage.

=== Bank litigation ===
During the lawsuit, Carlson sued LaSalle Bank/Bank of America Wilmington Trust for $45 million, charging that the parties breached their fiduciary duties, were negligent, failed to do the most basic due diligence, "retained sole and exclusive possession of the original Policy documents, contracts, and records relating to the Transaction and did not disclose all the documents and information in the Transaction" to Carlson and when he did receive a PDF of the policy it was highly redacted and had missing pages. Only after Carlson was sued by AIG was he able to see the policy books, underwriting materials and financials. Carlson asserted that the parties blessed the transaction and said that their negligence and secrecy triggered the AIG lawsuit.

Carlson's $45 million suit was in response to the Tomlinson Estate and Tomisue Hilbert, Germaine Tomlinson's (the insured) daughter, being allowed to intervene in the AIG lawsuit and suing Carlson for $45,000,000 along with Wilmington Trust, Coventry Capital, AIG and LaSalle Bank. Hilbert alleged that the insurance policy was for "estate planning purposes" and that she and her family should receive the death benefit even though she and her family never paid any premiums. Tomisue and her husband Steve Hilbert alleged that Carlson, AIG, LaSalle Bank, Wilmington Trust and Coventry Capital were wagering on her mother's life. This became known in the media as the "Death Bet" case. The Hilberts had other "far reaching" allegations: that Carlson, LaSalle Bank, Wilmington Trust, Coventry Capital and AIG were all leading a conspiracy against her and her late mother's estate. Marty Wood, vice president of the Insurance Institute of Indiana said the Hilberts and Tomlinson's other biological heirs don't have a "clear path to collecting the $15,000,000." If a court found the policy valid, the proceeds would be collected by Carlson. If the policy was determined to be invalid, no one could collect.

Carlson and Steve Hilbert agreed that AIG should pay the claim.

Dennis Francis McCrosson, III of McCrosson and Associates, initially appeared with lawyers from the international law firm of Baker and Daniels appearing a few months later to represent JB Carlson and all of the Carlson entities in the claims he was advancing and all of the claims against him and his entities. On August 16, 2010, one of JB Carlson's lawyers entered a guilty plea and was sentenced on a DUI. Four days later, Carlson dismissed the firm. In October 2010, Carlson's attorney-client privileged documents started appearing on the internet and in Indianapolis. Dennis Francis McCrosson, III from McCrosson and Associates remained on the case. Jeffrey O. Meunier represented J.B. Carlson personally.

Maynard Cooper & Gale, a 200 plus firm from Birmingham, AL, represented AIG.

Magistrate Judge Jane Magnus-Stinson and Federal Judge Sarah Evans Barker presided over the AIG/Carlson lawsuit until President Obama (with the support of Senators Lugar and Bayh) nominated her as Judge of the United States District Court for the Southern District of Indiana on June 14, 2010. Magistrate Judge Tim A. Baker was assigned to the AIG/Carlson case on June 15, 2010. Federal Judge Sarah Evans Barker remained.

=== The Martin report ===
The Martin report analyzed key facts relating to AIG's claims that Carlson wagered, intended on selling the policy and a host of other claims. The report indirectly cleared Carlson of the accusations and claims. Carlson did not pay for or know of the existence of the report until it was released.

Carlson fought AIG for nearly 3 years in the end spending $8 million in legal fees and associated costs. Carlson's lawsuit against Wilmington Trust, LaSalle Bank and Bank of America was shorter.

=== AIG sells death-bet securities ===
AIG tried selling death-bet securities, attempting to do the very same thing it sued Carlson for allegedly doing. AIG was actively by rallying support among investors and credit-rating firms for controversial transactions also called "death bonds," "blood pools" and "collateralized death obligations" because the investor's return comes from the death of the insured. AIG had about $18 Billion worth of policies it was trying to sell.

=== Foul play accusations ===
Throughout the entire case Germaine Tomlinson's daughter, Tomisue Hilbert, made assertions of foul-play.

The Marion county coroner ruled Tomlinson's 2008 death accidental asphyxiation by drowning compounded by alcohol-based intoxication. After the police and coroner said, "Tomlinson accidentally fell into the bathtub while drunk" they reopened their inquiry at Tomlinson's daughter, Tomisue Hilbert, and the family's urging even though the family and Hilbert "acknowledged having no hard evidence,""weren't pointing fingers at anyone," and, "I’m not accusing anybody of anything."

=== Reinvestigation ===
JB Carlson told the Wall Street Journal that Tomlinson's was "tremendously painful" and it "is just ridiculous" to think that the death was anything but a tragic accident. Carlson said he had not heard from the police, was willing to cooperate and encouraged further investigation "because it would clear the air" by showing that Tomlinson was alive when he last saw her. Captain Mark Rice, head of the homicide division of the Indianapolis Metropolitan Police Department said even though they are making new inquiries the police stand by their conclusion that the death was accidental and that he was "confident" it was an accident. Carlson's attorney said: "Everyone who has looked into this, except the Hilbert's, has concluded there is no foul play.” On November 8, 2010 Police spokesman Sgt. Paul Thompson said that the reinvestigation was closed and that they had not changed their view that Tomlinson's death was accidental.

Tomlinson's son, Randy Lee Ball, found her and police said that a rug was crumpled up, a glass shelf was knocked over and a faucet knob on the tub was broken. The coroner's autopsy found no bruising on her body. “Alfarena Ballew, chief deputy coroner for Marion County, says the scene was ‘consistent with a fall.’ She also said her records show that the house's doors were locked. Laura Covington, disputes that saying her brother (Randy Ball) found a patio door unlocked and he locked it before police arrived.” “Detective Mike Mitchell said, ‘We worked it as a murder case’ for several months but concluded the death was accidental.”

Earlier in the night Tomlinson had been drinking heavily and dancing under a white parasol. Later people noticed Tomlinson stumbling and others suggested that Carlson take her home according to Carlson and two other people in the club that night. Tomlinson and Carlson were walked to Carlson's waiting limousine by the bar owner. Tomisue Hilbert described her mother "as a healthy, active and vibrant woman with a busy and fulfilling life".

In an odd twist, Steve and Tomisue Hilbert were attending a party that was serving minors alcohol and when police arrived. Steve Hilbert said, "get a warrant." While Steve and Tomisue Hilbert were not arrested, former quarterback Jack Trudeau was arrested for serving minors alcohol.

=== SEC, GAO and Department of Insurance ===
On Thursday, July 22, 2010, the Securities and Exchange Commission called for tighter federal regulation of the life-insurance secondary market while a Government Accountability Office report cited inconsistencies in regulation across states.

== Refinancing ==
Norman C. Kirst was a Wisconsin financier who did business with Philippine President Ferdinand Marcos, his wife Imelda Marcos, and aides to US presidents Gerald Ford and Richard Nixon. At some point Kirst started doing business with Carlson and his companies, arranging refinancings. Kirst died in Vero Beach, Florida, having suffered for two years from "extremely advanced" dementia. Kirst died the same day or the day after Tomlinson died. Carlson said Kirst "seemed fine on phone conversations through about June 2008 when he lined up the refinancing, but the illness could explain its failure to materialize."

== SJB lawsuit ==
On April 20, 2009, Opportunity Bridge Funding, LLC (OBF), sued Las Vegas businessman James C. Burchard and his company SJB Investments, LLC in Minnesota charging that Burchard committed fraud in his efforts to secure Carlson a $1,273,902.17 loan from Minnesota-based-lender OBF in an effort to refinance a small portion of the original refinancing. OBF and Carlson claimed that Burchard, a loan broker, submitted documents to secure Carlson's assets for himself and had no reason or legal right to claim the asset as his own, essentially stealing assets from Carlson and compromising OBF's (lender) right to secure the assets in the event of Carlson's default. Claims of fraudulent inducement, breach of fiduciary duty and negligence were also asserted. Burchard responded by stating that they owed "no duty to either party" and "no fiduciary duty to either party" and later countersued Carlson in Nevada claiming breach of contract. The case was consolidated to Minnesota and was resolved in a court ordered settlement conference. The settlement conference was concluded on Friday, July 24, 2009.
