= Carlston =

Carlston may refer to:

- Carlston (name)
- Carlston Township, Freeborn County, Minnesota
- Carlston Annis Shell Mound, archaeological site in Kentucky, U.S.
