= Carlsten (surname) =

Carlsten or Carlstén is a surname. Notable people known by this name include the following:

- Birgit Carlstén (1949–2025), Swedish actress and singer
- Bruce Carlsten (born 1958), American engineer
- Rune Carlsten (1890–1970), Swedish actor, screenwriter and film director

== See also ==
- Carsten (disambiguation)
- Carlsen
- Carlston (name)
