= Carlzon =

Carlzon is a surname. Notable people with the surname include:

== People ==
- Cathrin Carlzon (born 1983), Swedish Olympic swimmer
- Jan Carlzon (born 1941), Swedish businessman
- Lars Carlzon (1918–2004), Swedish prelate and Bishop in Stockholm

== See also ==
- Jacob Karlzon
- Karlsson (disambiguation)
