= Eric Carlson =

Eric Carlson may refer to:

- Eric Carlson (architect) (born 1963), American architect
- Eric Carlson (1894–1932), U.S. veteran shot in the Bonus Army protests
- Eric Carlson (1958–2024), American heavy metal guitarist, founding member of Mentors
