= Carl Faingold =

American neuroscientist

Carl L. Faingold is an American neuroscientist and professor in the Department of Pharmacology of Southern Illinois University School of Medicine in Springfield, Illinois. He is a founding faculty member of both the department and the School of Medicine. He has had an extensive career as a medical and graduate student educator and as a researcher in brain mechanisms. He is a specialist in the actions of drugs on brain activity at the level of the single neuron as it relates to networks of neurons in awake behaving animals.

== Education ==
Faingold received a B.S. in pharmacy from the University of Illinois at Chicago in 1965, and a Ph.D. in pharmacology from Northwestern University in 1970. This was followed by a postdoctoral fellowship at the University of Missouri Institute of Psychiatry.

== Research interests ==
A major research direction in Faingold's lab is in the area of sudden unexpected death in epilepsy (SUDEP), which is a devastating and relatively rare problem that can occur in patients with epilepsy. Since first publishing about a mouse model of SUDEP in 2006 in DBA mice, his lab has explored the role of the brain chemicals, serotonin and adenosine, in potential preventative treatments for SUDEP in these mice. This included a possible role of agents that enhance the action of serotonin in SUDEP prevention. These agents include selective serotonin reuptake inhibitors (SSRIs) which prevent SUDEP in mice with some evidence of potential usefulness in human epileptic patients as well.

His lab has published several recent papers on the subject of SUDEP prevention in two mouse models of SUDEP in DBA/1 and DBA/2 mice.

== Publications ==
He has participated in the writing of AMSPC Knowledge Objectives in Pharmacology as co-editor along with Richard Eisenberg, working on the 2012 update and expansion of the pharmacology teaching objectives. He also served as co-editor of Brody's Human Pharmacology with Lynn Wecker, George Dunaway, Lynn Crespo, and Stephanie Watts.

In 2014, he published Neuronal Networks in Brain Function, CNS Disorders, and Therapeutics with co-editor, Hal Blumenfeld.

== Selected works ==
- Uteshev, V.V., S. Tupal, Y. Mhaskar, and C. L. Faingold. Abnormal serotonin receptor expression in DBA/2 mice associated with susceptibility to sudden death due to respiratory arrest. Epilepsy Res. 88, pp. 183–188, 2010.
- Faingold, C.L., Tupal, S. and Randall, M. Prevention of seizure-induced sudden death in a chronic SUDEP model by semichronic administration of a selective serotonin reuptake inhibitor. Epilepsy Behav., 22:186-190, 2011.
- Faingold, C.L., Randall, M. Mhaskar, Y. and Uteshev, V. V.. Differences in serotonin receptor expression in the brainstem may explain the differential ability of a serotonin agonist to block seizure-induced sudden death in DBA/2 vs. DBA/1 mice. Brain Res., 1418:104-110, 2011.
- Faingold CL, Tupal S, Mhaskar Y, Uteshev VV.DBA mice as models of sudden unexpected death in epilepsy. IN: Sudden Death in Epilepsy: Forensic and Clinical Issue, (C. Lathers, P. Schraeder, M. Bungo, J. Leestma, editors), Taylor and Francis, 657–674, 2010.
- Faingold CL. Brainstem networks: reticulo-cortical synchronization in generalized convulsive seizures. In: Noebels JL, Avoli M, Rogawski MA, Olsen RW, Delgado-Escueta AV, eds. Jasper's Basic Mechanisms of the Epilepsies. 4th ed. New York, NY: Oxford University Press, 2012: 257–271. Bethesda (MD): National Center for Biotechnology Information (US). Available from: .
- Feng, H.J., Faingold, C.L. Ketamine in mood disorders and epilepsy. In: Costa A and Villalba E, eds. Horizons in Neuroscience Research, Vol. 10. P. 103–122, Nova Science Publishers, New York, 2013.
- Tupal, S. and Faingold, C.L. The amygdala to periaqueductal gray pathway: Plastic changes induced by audiogenic kindling and reversal by gabapentin. Brain Res. 1475:71-79, 2012.
- Faingold, C.L. Kommajosyula, S.P., Long, X., Plath, K., Randall, M. Serotonin and sudden death: Differential effects of serotonergic drugs on seizure-induced respiratory arrest in DBA/1 mice. Epilepsy Behav. 37:198-203, 2014.
- Zeng, C., Long, X., Cotten, J.F., Forman, S.A., Solt, K., Faingold, C.L., and Feng, H.J. Fluoxetine prevents respiratory arrest without enhancing ventilation in DBA/1 mice. Epilepsy Behav. 45:1-7, 2015.
- Faingold CL, Randall M, Zeng C, Peng S, Long X, Feng HJ, Serotonergic agents act on 5-HT3 receptors in the brain to block seizure-induced respiratory arrest in the DBA/1 mouse model of SUDEP.Epilepsy Behav. 64(Pt A):166-170, 2016.
- Kommajosyula, S.P., Randall, M.E., Brozoski, T.J., Odintsov, B.M. and Faingold, C.L., Specific subcortical structures are activated during seizure-induced death in a model of sudden unexpected death in epilepsy (SUDEP): A manganese-enhanced magnetic resonance imaging study.Epilepsy Res 135:87-94. 2017.
- Kommajosyula SP, Tupal S, Faingold CL. Deficient post-ictal cardiorespiratory compensatory mechanisms mediated by the periaqueductal gray may lead to death in a mouse model of SUDEP. Epilepsy Res. 2018 Nov; 147:1-8.
- Schilling WP, McGrath MK, Yang T, Glazebrook PA, Faingold CL, Kunze DL. Simultaneous cardiac and respiratory inhibition during seizure precedes death in the DBA/1 audiogenic mouse model of SUDEP PLoS One. 2019 Oct 21;14(10):e0223468. doi: 10.1371/journal.pone.0223468. eCollection 2019.
- Tupal, S and Faingold, Cl, Serotonin 5-HT4 receptors play a critical role in the action of fenfluramine to block seizure-induced sudden death in a mouse model of SUDEP, Epilepsy Research 2021. https://doi.org/10.1016/j.eplepsyres.2021.106777.
- Faingold CL, Feng HJ.A unified hypothesis of SUDEP: Seizure-induced respiratory depression induced by adenosine may lead to SUDEP but can be prevented by autoresuscitation and other restorative respiratory response mechanisms mediated by the action of serotonin on the periaqueductal gray. Epilepsia. 2023 Epub 2023 Feb 15.PMID 36715572.
