= Erin G. Carlston =

New Zealand academic

- Born: 1962 (age 63–64)
- Education: Harvard University
- Scientific career
- Fields: Modernism, Jewish studies, gender and sexuality
- Workplaces: Auckland University
- Thesis: Thinking fascism: Sapphic Modernism and fascist modernity (1995)

Erin G. Carlston is a New Zealand academic, as of 2014 a full professor of English at the University of Auckland.

== Academic career ==
Carlston completed her PhD at Stanford, with a thesis titled Thinking fascism: Sapphic Modernism and fascist modernity; the published version of the thesis was widely reviewed. Carlston worked at the University of North Carolina at Chapel Hill, where she was on the board of the Carolina Center for Jewish Studies and was director of the Program in Sexuality Studies. She then moved to the University of Auckland, where she is a Professor of English.

Carlston's 2013 book Double Agents discusses the interest that white middle-class gay writers have taken in twentieth century espionage and treason, by examining espionage scandals involving Jewish and/or gay men, and how these relate to works by Jewish and/or gay male authors. Carlston currently researches race and masculinity in Aotearoa New Zealand.

== Selected works ==
- Carlston, Erin G.. Double Agents: Espionage, Literature, and Liminal Citizens. Columbia University Press, 2013.
- Carlston, Erin G. "Secret dossiers: Sexuality, race, and treason in Proust and the Dreyfus Affair." MFS Modern Fiction Studies 48(4) (2002): 937–968.
- Carlston, Erin G. Thinking Fascism: Sapphic Modernism and Fascist Modernity. Stanford University Press, 1998.
- Carlston, Erin G. "‘A Finer Differentiation’: Female Homosexuality and the American Medical Community, 1926–1940." Science and Homosexualities (1997): 177–96.
- Carlston, Erin G. "Versatile Interests: Reading Bisexuality in The Friendly Young Ladies." RePresenting Bisexualities: Subjects and Cultures of Fluid Desire (1996): 165–79.
- Carlston, Erin G. "Zami and the politics of plural identity." Sexual practice, textual theory: Lesbian cultural criticism (1993): 226–36.
- Irigaray, Luce, and Erin G. Carlston. "The language of man." Cultural Critique 13 (1989): 191–202.
