= John Carlson =

John Carlson may refer to:

- John Carlson (American football) (born 1984), tight end
- John Carlson (biologist), American biologist
- John Carlson (ice hockey) (born 1990), American ice hockey defenseman
- John Carlson (Minnesota politician) (born 1953), American politician and member of the Minnesota State Senate
- John Carlson (radio host) (born 1959), talk radio host on KOMO in Seattle, Washington
- John Carlson (sportscaster) (1933–2016), former American sportscaster
- John Fabian Carlson (1875–1947), Swedish-born American Impressionist artist
- John Roy Carlson (1909–1991), journalist and author of Under Cover
