= Paul Carlson =

American physician (1928–1964)

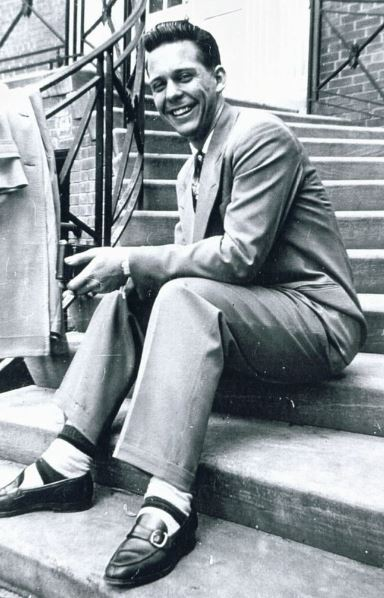
- Paul Carlson
- Born: March 31, 1928; Culver City, California, U.S.
- Died: November 24, 1964 (aged 36); Stanleyville, Republic of the Congo
- Education: George Washington University
- Occupations: Medical doctor, missionary
- Known for: Missionary work in Congo
- Spouse: Lois Carlson Lindbloom
- Children: 2

Paul Earle Carlson (March 31, 1928 – November 24, 1964) was an American physician and medical missionary who served in Wasolo, a town in what is now the Democratic Republic of the Congo. He originated from Rolling Hills Covenant Church in Southern California, which is a member of the Evangelical Covenant Church denomination. He was killed in 1964 by rebel insurgents after being falsely accused of being an American spy.

== Biography ==
Carlson was born in Culver City, California, the son of Swedish immigrant Gustav Carlson, a machinist, and his wife Ruth. He graduated from North Park University in 1948, and went on to earn a bachelor's degree in anthropology from Stanford University in 1951, and finished medical school at George Washington University in 1956. After finishing medical school, he completed five years of internship and then surgery residency in Redondo Beach, California, during which time he met and married nurse Lois Lindblom of Menominee, Michigan.

In 1961, Carlson decided to serve as a missionary doctor. He arrived in Congo and began working as a medical missionary for six months in Ubangi Province. In December 1961 he returned to Redondo Beach but continued to talk of returning to the Congo because of its great needs.

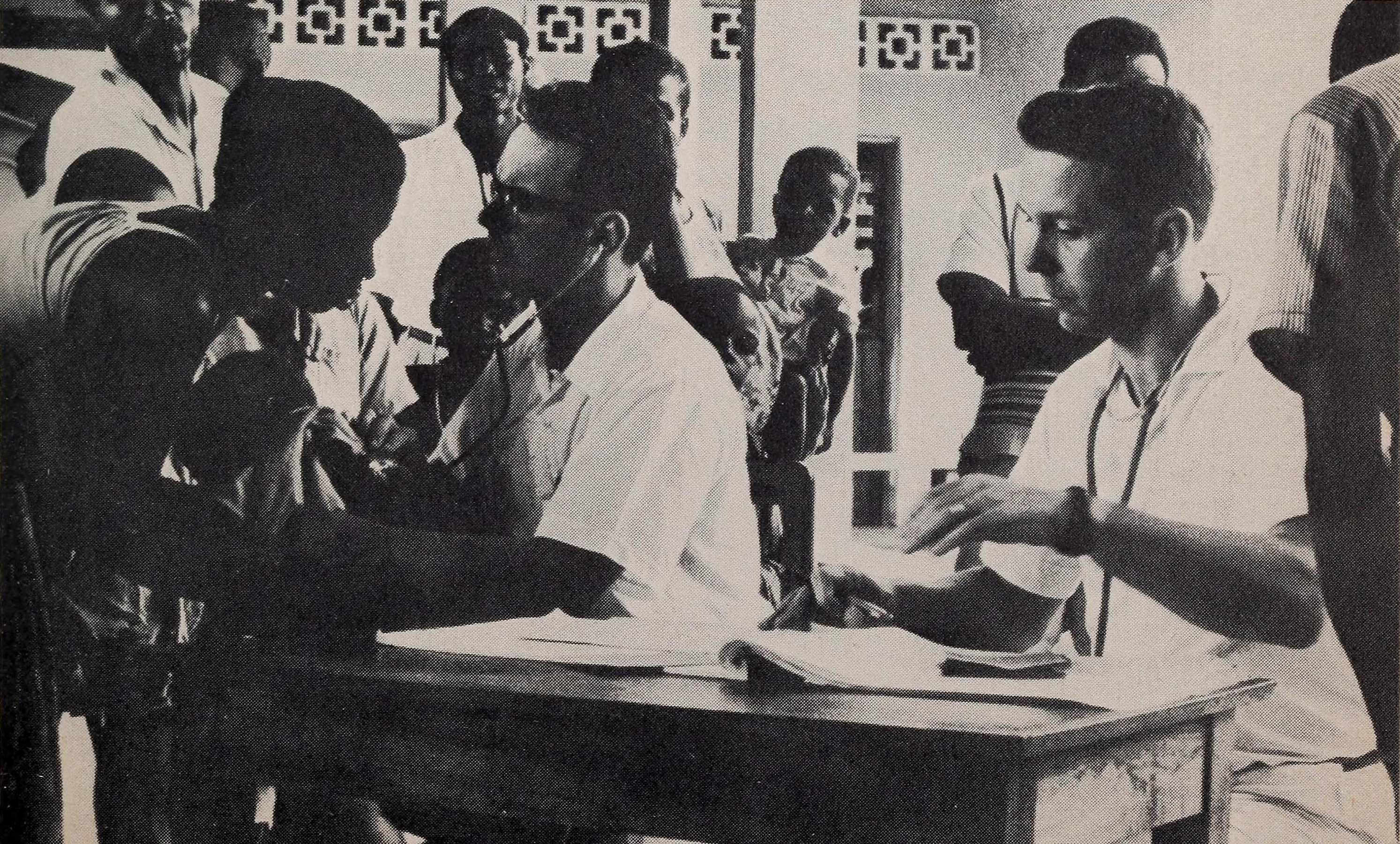
Carlson at work at Ouassolo Hospital in the Congo

In July 1963, along with his wife, son Wayne, and daughter Lynette, he returned to the Ubangi region of the African nation known at the time as the Republic of the Congo. Activities included working in the eighty-bed hospital and leper colony. During this time, Carlson acquired the nickname Monganga Paul (Monganga meaning "doctor" in the Lingala tongue). This work continued until the political unrest of the time reached them. In August 1964, rebels captured Stanleyville, now Kisangani, and the Carlson family crossed the Ubangi river to seek refuge in the Central African Republic. Carlson, however, remained committed to his hospital and work in Wasolo, and he returned.

This final return placed him in the middle of the political unrest of the time, and he soon fell into the hands of the communist-inspired Congolese rebels of the Simba Rebellion. His home was looted, the hospital and other buildings were damaged and two of his staff members were shot. Under the unstable leadership of Christophe Gbenye, the rebels accused Carlson of being an American spy and took him as a hostage to Stanleyville. Carlson was held there and was mentally and physically tortured. In November 1964, Gbenye announced he would execute Carlson, prompting the U.S. government to begin negotiations for his release. In Stanleyville, Carlson joined the American consul as a captive of the rebels. Upon a breakdown in negotiations, paratroopers were flown in and the rebels panicked. On November 24, 1964, some Simba soldiers opened fire into a crowd, and Carlson and several others ran to a wall in hopes of escaping. Before Carlson scaled the wall, he urged a clergyman to go first, and as he was climbing the wall after the clergyman, he was shot and killed by rebel gun fire.

== Legacy ==
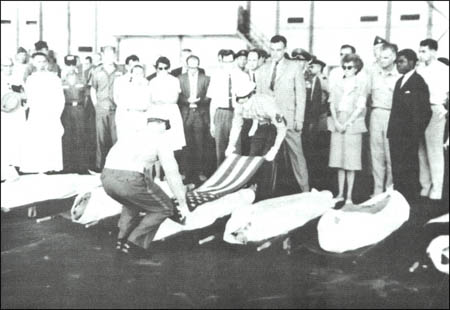
An American flag is placed over the body of Paul Carlson at a ceremony in Leopoldville.

Carlson became known as the "Congo Martyr" and was featured on the covers of both Time and Life magazines. His tombstone at Karawa bears the inscription "Greater love has no man than this, that a man lay down his life for his friends."— John 15:13 Shortly after Carlson's death, his wife Lois and others formed the Paul Carlson Medical Program with the goal of raising money to support the Loko hospital. They expanded with agricultural programs to teach nutrition, agronomy, and microenterprise. In 2000, the Paul Carlson Medical Program was revitalized and now operates under the name the Paul Carlson Partnership. The Paul Carlson Partnership is a Chicago-based nonprofit organization with a mission that focuses on investing in health care, economic development, and education in Central Africa.

After her husband's death, Lois Carlson penned the biography Monganga Paul, published in 1965.

Carlson Park and the surrounding Carlson Park neighborhood in Culver City, California, are named in his honor. The Twilight Zone television episode entitled "You Drive" was filmed in this neighborhood one year before Carlson's death.

His home church, Rolling Hills Covenant Church, named its Carlson Hall after him.

In 2004, the Evangelical Covenant Church produced a documentary about Carlson entitled "Monganga"

== Bibliography ==
- Carlson, Lois C. (1965). Monganga Paul. Chicago: Covenant Publications. ISBN 9780910452939.
- "Congo Martyr". Life. New York: Time Inc. December 4, 1964.
