= Carlton B. Ardery Jr. =

Carlton Breckenridge Ardery Jr. (17 October 1923 – 15 June 1965) was a former military and later civilian test pilot who flew developmental and test missions for Republic Aviation of Farmingdale, New York. He was killed in the in-flight breakup of an F-105 Thunderchief in 1965.

== Background ==
Ardery, a native of Lexington, Kentucky, went directly from high school into U.S. Army Air Force flight training, graduating in 1943 as a second lieutenant at Aloe Field, Victoria, Texas. He flew Boeing B-29 Superfortresses in the Pacific theatre with the 500th Bomb Group, 73d Bomb Wing, in 1944–45, and later, in the Korean War, flew 100 missions in Republic F-84E Thunderjets. He was awarded the Distinguished Flying Cross and the Air Medal. He left the service in 1952 to join the Republic Aviation Corporation.

== Test pilot ==
Ardery became an experimental and production test pilot for Republic Aviation, eventually being assigned to the F-105 Thunderchief project as one of the principal test pilots for the fighter-bomber from its maiden flight in 1955. As the design was improved, he flew the newer variants, including the advanced D-model, specializing in checkout flights "on the sophisticated electronic units which make the jet literally 'automatic'." In early 1960, he successfully completed a 300-mile roundtrip flight with "hands-off" or all on instruments except for take-off and landing. "It was the longest instrument-controlled flight of the F-105D to date."

In June 1960, he was appointed senior experimental pilot for Republic Aviation Corp. at the Air Proving Ground Test Center at Eglin AFB, Florida, where he joined fellow Republic test pilot Don Seaver in flight tests of the Mach 2 Thunderchief. At this point he had nearly 200 hours flying time in F-105s, and over 7,500 flying hours.

On 11 June 1963, Ardery took the prototype two-seat F-105F, F-105F-1-RE, 62-4412, to Mach 1.15 on its maiden flight.

== Death ==
Due to an unfortunate oversight in inspecting F-105 Thunderchiefs following the fatal crash of a Thunderbirds air demonstration team F-105B at Hamilton Air Force Base, California on 9 May 1964, one was missed and it subsequently crashed 15 June 1965 while operating out of Eglin Air Force Base. Early-production JF-105D-5-RE, 58-1149, the fourth D-model built, and first Block 5 airframe, flown by Ardery, 41, broke apart during a 7.33 G pull-up during a test mission when the same weak backbone plate failed that caused the Thunderbirds fatal accident, stated a Fairchild Hiller Accident Report. The pilot was killed as the disintegrating airframe burst into flame. The aircraft crashed into the Gulf of Mexico 39 miles SE of Eglin AFB.

At the time of his death, Ardery had logged over 9,000 flight hours. He was survived by his wife Gloria, and three children, Linda, 10; Ann, 5; and Breck, 2; all of Fort Walton Beach, Florida.
