= Stephanie Carlson =

American biologist

Stephanie Marie Carlson
- Education: University of California, Davis (B.S.); University of Massachusetts, Amherst (M.S.); University of Washington (Ph.D.)
- Scientific career
- Fields: Evolutionary Ecology, Fisheries
- Workplaces: University of California Berkeley
- Thesis: The evolutionary effects of bear predation on salmon life history and morphology (2006)
- Website: nature.berkeley.edu/carlsonlab/

Stephanie M. Carlson is the A.S. Leopold Chair in Wildlife Biology at the University of California Berkeley. Her research considers fish ecology, freshwater ecology, and evolutionary ecology.

== Education ==
Carlson was the first member of her family to attend college. She earned her undergraduate degree in evolution and ecology at the University of California, Davis. She moved across the United States for her graduate studies, joining the Department of Organismic and Evolutionary Biology at the University of Massachusetts for a master's degree. After completing her master's degree in 2002, Carlson joined the University of Washington School for Aquatic and Fisheries Science as a doctoral researcher.

== Research ==
Carson studies how predator-prey relationships and anthropogenic influences inform the ecology and evolution of freshwater fish populations. After graduating, Carlson was awarded a Marie Curie Early Stage Training Fellowship to join the University of Oslo Centre for Ecological and Evolutionary Synthesis. In 2007 Carlson was awarded appointed an NSF Postdoctoral Fellow in Biological Informatics at the University of California, Santa Cruz.

She started her independent scientific career at the University of California, Berkeley. Here she has specialised on evolution and loss of biodiversity among salmon populations, impacts of drought and climate change on streams, the ecological and evolutionary impacts of management (water, fishery, hatchery, and protected areas), harvest selection and evolutionary enlightened management. Her research identified that the loss of diversity amongst salmon in managed rivers reduces their ability to respond to climate change. Salmon are usually protected form changing environmental conditions by the portfolio effect; which describes the diversity of salmon migration strategies.

== Awards and honours ==
- 2005 J. Frances Allen Scholarship, American Fisheries Society
- 2010 Jasper Loftus-Hills Young Investigator Award, American Society of Naturalists
- 2013 Young Faculty Award
- 2014 Rose Hills Innovator Award
- 2016 A.S. Leopold Chair in Wildlife Biology

== Select publications ==
- Siepielski, Adam M.; DiBattista, Joseph D.; Carlson, Stephanie M. (2009). "It's about time: the temporal dynamics of phenotypic selection in the wild". Ecology Letters. 12 (11): 1261–1276. Bibcode:2009EcolL..12.1261S. doi:10.1111/j.1461-0248.2009.01381.x. hdl:10072/425168. ISSN 1461-0248. PMID 19740111.
- Darimont, Chris T.; Carlson, Stephanie M.; Kinnison, Michael T.; Paquet, Paul C.; Reimchen, Thomas E.; Wilmers, Christopher C. (January 12, 2009). "Human predators outpace other agents of trait change in the wild: Fig. 1". Proceedings of the National Academy of Sciences. 106 (3): 952–954. doi:10.1073/pnas.0809235106. ISSN 0027-8424. PMC 2630061. PMID 19139415.
- Carlson, Stephanie M.; Seamons, Todd R. (2008). "A review of quantitative genetic components of fitness in salmonids: implications for adaptation to future change". Evolutionary Applications. 1 (2): 222–238. Bibcode:2008EvApp...1..222C. doi:10.1111/j.1752-4571.2008.00025.x. ISSN 1752-4571. PMC 3352437. PMID 25567628.

== Personal life ==
Carlson is part of the organisation 500 Queer Scientists.
