= Charlie Carlson =

American novelist

- Born: Charlie Carl Carlson, Jr. December 31, 1943; Sanford, Florida, U.S.
- Died: August 30, 2015 (aged 71); Sanford, Florida, U.S.
- Occupations: Actor; producer; writer; novelist
- Writing career
- Years active: 1999–2015
- Military career
- Allegiance: United States of America
- Branch: United States Army
- Rank: Command Sergeant Major
- Unit: 11th Armored Cavalry Regiment
- Conflicts: Vietnam War
- Awards: Legion of Merit

Charlie Carl Carlson Jr. (December 31, 1943 – August 30, 2015), was an American author, novelist, actor, and film producer. Known as "Florida's Man in Black", or "Master of the Weird", Carlson specialized in the paranormal, strange events and places, and many historical books. Carlson also produced and acted in radio shows and movie productions related the genre.

== Military service and early career ==
Charlie Carlson joined the United States Army and spent two tours in Vietnam with the 11th Armored Cavalry Regiment (Blackhorse) and after twenty-five years retired as a Command Sergeant Major. He earned several decorations including the United States Legion of Merit. After retirement, Carlson went on to become a showman of outdoor attractions, including owning a circus sideshow.

== Writing and acting ==
He began his writing career as author of several Florida history books and the Civil War. In 1997, he began writing about Florida folklore and published the successful book, Strange Florida and, in 1999, portrayed Professor Charles Morehouse on the then-named Sci-Fi Channel's Curse of the Blair Witch. He has produced and appeared in several television documentaries related to Florida history and unexplained phenomena. He was a frequent guest on Florida talk radio and was the author of the 2005 best selling book, Weird Florida and, in 2006, published his first fiction novel, Ashley's Shadow.

He was a contributing writer to Weird Hauntings and Weird Encounters, both by Sterling Publishing.

== Other activities ==
Mr. Carlson lived on the east coast of Florida, and was one of the founding members of the Grand Order of Weird Writers.

In 2008, he was producing an independent film entitled Henry Blackhart Is Dead, by Blue Heron International Pictures about a legendary haunting set on the east coast of Florida during the Great Depression, and was acting in The Cleansing, about a real-life cleansing ceremony in a haunted building. He also produced and was featured among the cast for Hunt For the Devil, a ghost hunting DVD.

In 2010, he became the host of his own PBS television show, Weird Florida: Roads Less Traveled which aired nationally. In 2012 PBS released his new television show, Weird Florida: On the Road Again.

== Death ==
Charlie Carlson died on August 30, 2015 at age 71. He was buried at Oaklawn Memorial Park in Lake Mary, Florida.

== Bibliography ==
- When Celery was King
- I Got my Dress Tail Wet in Soda Water Creek
- History of Bookertown (Co-writer)
- First Florida Cavalry Regiment
- History of Monroe (Co-writer)
- Strange Florida I
- Tux and Tales of a Wizard
- Weird U.S.(Contributing writer)
- Weird Hauntings (Contributing writer)
- Weird Encounters (Contributing writer)
- From Fort Mellon to Baghdad
- Seminole County's Curious Files
- Swedish History of Seminole County, FL.
- Weird Florida
- Ashley's Shadow
- Strange Florida II

== Filmography ==
=== As actor ===
- Curse of the Blair Witch
- Hunt For The Devil
- The Cleansing
- Stix and Stones
- Zombies from Cyber Space

=== As narrator or host ===
- Night With Johnny Duncan
- Paranormal Florida
- PBS Weird Florida: Roads Less Traveled
- PBS Weird Florida: On The Road Again

=== As producer ===
- Harry Blackheart Is Dead
- Safe Haven
