= Chilton (given name) =

Chilton is a generally masculine given name which may refer to:

- Chilton Allan (1786–1858), American lawyer and politician
- Chilton C. Baker (1874–1967), American politician
- Chilton Jennings (c. 1881–1919), African-American lynching victim
- Chilton Price (1913–2010), American female songwriter
- Chilton Taylor (born 1951), English former cricketer
- Chilton A. White (1826–1900), American lawyer, politician and white supremacist
