= Viktor Karlsson =

Swedish bandy player

Viktor Karlsson (born 15 April 1988) is a Swedish bandy player who currently plays for Hammarby IF Bandy.

Karlsson has played for two clubs-

Hammarby IF Bandy (2005)
GT-76 (2005–2006)
Hammarby IF Bandy (from 2006)
