= Eric Carlson Three-Decker =

- U.S. National Register of Historic Places
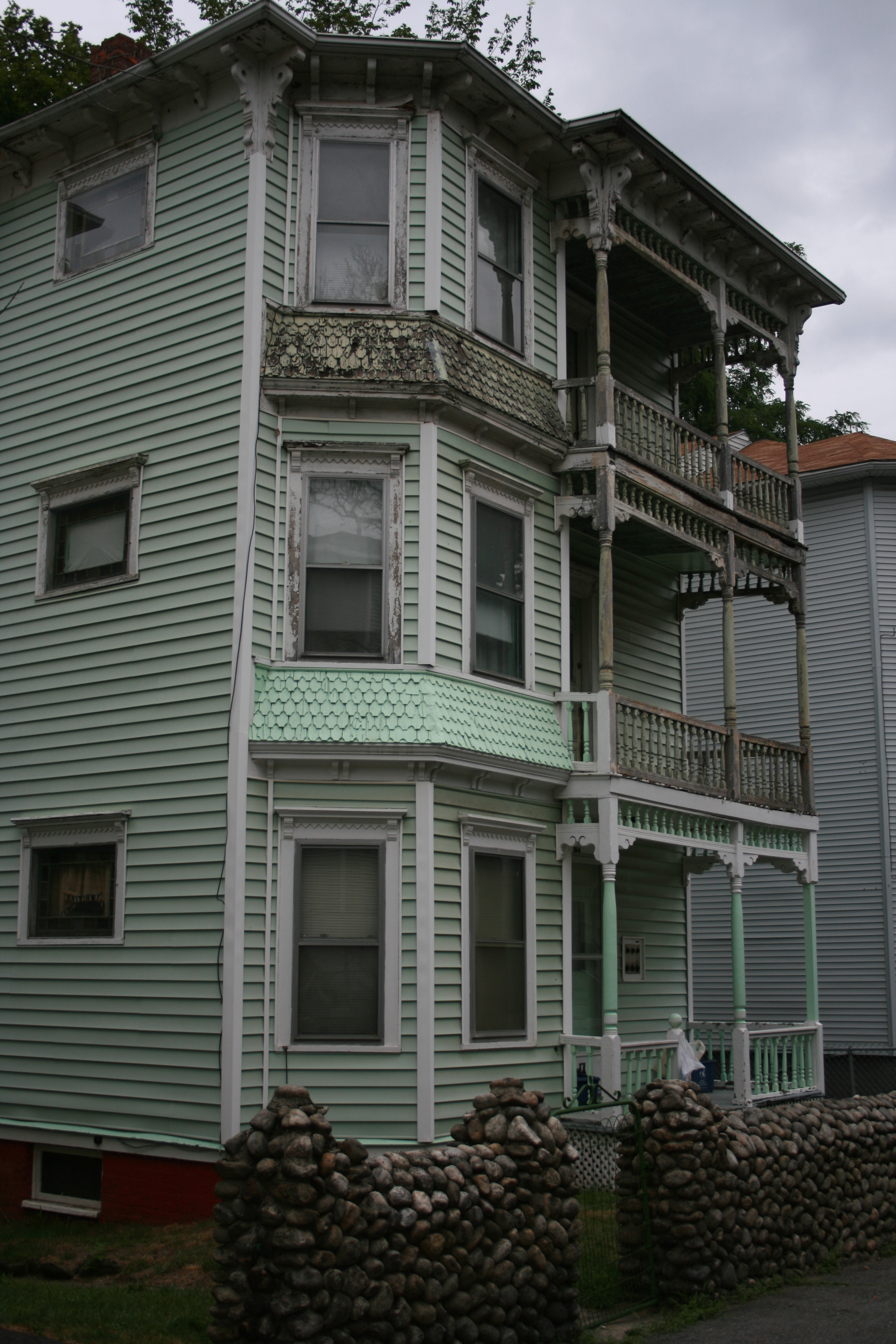

- Location within Massachusetts Location within the United States
- Location: 154 Eastern Avenue; Worcester, Massachusetts
- Coordinates: 42°16′27″N 71°47′20″W
- Area: Less than one acre
- Built: c. 1894
- Architectural style: Queen Anne
- MPS: Worcester Three-Deckers TR
- NRHP reference No.: 89002415
- Added to NRHP: February 9, 1990

The Eric Carlson Three-Decker is a historic triple decker house in Worcester, Massachusetts. Built c. 1894, it is a well-preserved instance of the form with Queen Anne styling. It was listed on the National Register of Historic Places in 1990.

== Description and history ==
The Eric Carlson Three-Decker is located in Worcester's eastern Belmont Hill neighborhood, on the west side of Eastern Avenue south of Catharine Street. It is a three-story wood-frame structure, with a hip roof and clapboarded exterior. It has an extended cornice with brackets, as well as fish-scale shingling on skirt sections between floors. Some windows have caps with a sawtooth finish. Its main facade is divided into two sections: the left side has a projecting polygonal window bay, while the right side has a stack of three porches. The porch entrances are near the center, with small square fixed windows to their right. The porch features spindled balustrades and turned posts, with brackets at the tops.

The building was built about 1894, when the area was developing rapidly due to an influx of Scandinavian immigrants. Its first owner, Eric Carlson, was a blacksmith, who also lived here, as did at least one subsequent owner. Many of its early tenants worked in the city's industrial factories, many at the nearby North Works of the Washburn and Moen Company.

== See also ==
- National Register of Historic Places listings in eastern Worcester, Massachusetts
