= Åsa-Britt Karlsson =

Swedish politician (born 1957)

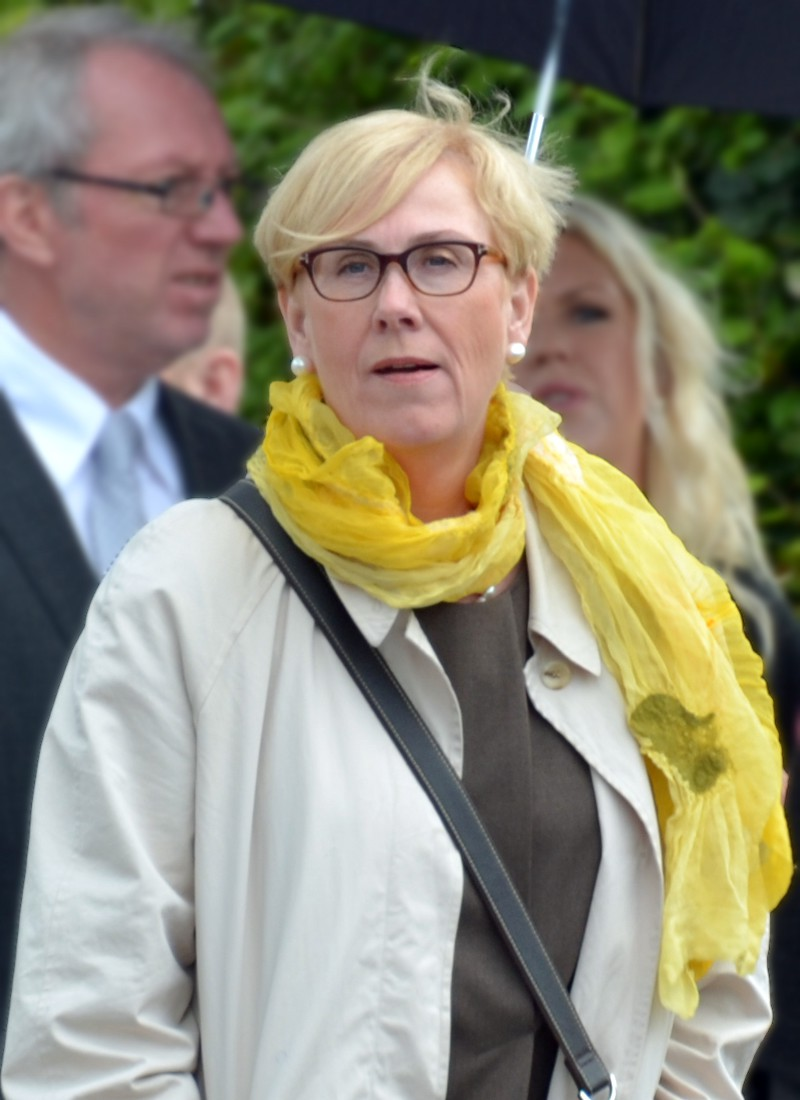
Åsa-Britt Karlsson

Åsa-Britt Karlsson (born 6 July 1957) is a Swedish politician. She is a member of the Centre Party.
