= Stranger-originated life insurance =

Form of life insurance investment

Stranger-originated life insurance ("STOLI") generally means any act, practice, or arrangement, at or prior to policy issuance, to initiate or facilitate the issuance of a life insurance policy for the intended benefit of a person who, at the time of policy origination, does not have an insurable interest in the life of the insured under the laws of the applicable state. This includes the purchase of life insurance with resources or guarantees from or through a person that, at the time of policy initiation, could not lawfully initiate the policy; an arrangement or other agreement to transfer ownership of the policy or the policy benefits to another person; or a trust or similar arrangement that is used directly or indirectly for the purpose of purchasing one or more policies for the intended benefit of another person in a manner that violates the insurable interest laws of the state. The main characteristic of a STOLI transaction is that the insurance is purchased solely as an investment vehicle, rather than for the benefit of the policy owner's beneficiaries. STOLI arrangements are typically promoted to consumers between the age of 65 and 85.

A STOLI transaction may require the cooperation of the insured, by, for example, allowing access to the insured's medical records. The policy owner also may be paid a fee for taking out the policy.

Descriptions of STOLI arrangements may vary. They may be called "zero premium life insurance", "estate maximization plans", "no cost to the insured plans", "new issue life settlements", "high-net-worth settlements", "non recourse premium finance transactions" or "death bets". A similar arrangement is known as spin-life.

== Legality ==
=== United States ===
In the United States, life insurance is regulated by the states. In general, state laws require an owner of a policy to have an insurable interest in the life of the insured. A STOLI arrangement effectively circumvents the insurable interest requirement, thereby making STOLI arrangements illegal, as of July 1, 2010. They also may be considered insurance fraud, which carries both civil and criminal penalties for the parties involved.

For example, in 2011, the former New York State Insurance Department (now the New York State Department of Financial Services), U.S. Postal Inspection Service, and the Internal Revenue Service conducted an investigation that led to the arrest of eight persons, most of whom were licensed insurance agents who were recruiting elderly clients in a scam that involved STOLI. These insurance agents submitted life insurance applications on the lives of the elderly persons, and the applications contained inflated net worth information. Insurers then issued insurance policies worth millions of dollars. The elderly persons then sold or attempted to sell the policies after the two-year contestability period had expired. The insurance premiums were either paid by the insurance agents with the commissions they earned on the policies or by third party investors. Some of the insureds were paid monthly for their cooperation, while others were promised part of the profit when their policies were sold. The former wife of one of the insurance agents was charged with extortion for threatening to go to the police unless she was paid to keep quiet. She was paid $10,000.

=== Canada ===
The trafficking of life insurance products is illegal in many Canadian provinces (the anti-trafficking provision was never enacted in Saskatchewan, New Brunswick, and Nova Scotia, while Quebec repealed it in 1974). At least one large Canadian insurer warns agents not to sell policies if the intent of the policyholder is to sell or immediately assign the policy to an unrelated third party with a non-insurable interest (other than a bank, used as collateral for a loan).

=== United Kingdom ===
The Life Assurance Act 1774 made such practices illegal. At the time, they were used for gambling.

The Financial Services Authority in the United Kingdom has warned its regulated firms against selling or marketing traded U.S. life insurance policies investments (TPLIs) as they are "high risk, toxic products", calling them highly problematic and advised UK investment firms to steer clear of them.

== See also ==
- Life settlement
- Corporate-owned life insurance
