= Carl Wittrock =

Dutch conductor, composer, and musicologist (born 1966)

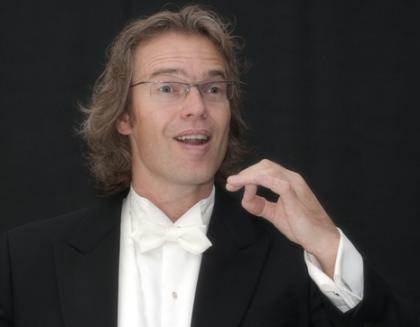

Background information
- Born: 1966 (age 59–60)
- Origin: Netherlands
- Occupations: Composer, conductor, music educator
- Instruments: Violin, clarinet
- Website: www.carlwittrock.nl

Carl Wittrock (born 1966 in Goor) is a composer, conductor, music educator, violinist and clarinettist from the Netherlands.

== Biography ==
Wittrock started with lessons in violin and clarinet at the school of music in Goor. He studied music education and conducting at ArtEZ Conservatorium in Enschede. He finished his conducting studies with a variety of national and international conducting courses.

Since 1984 Wittrock conducts several orchestras and works as music educator at Twickel in Hengelo.

In 1985 he started composing and writes especially for harmony and fanfare orchestra.

He was appointed Knight of the Order of Orange-Nassau on 28 June 2014 by Ank Bijleveld, Commissioner of the King.

=== Compositions ===
- 1989 Antarctica, written for harmony, fanfare and brassband orchestra
- 2000 Spanish Dance, written for Alto saxophone (or alto oboe) and harmony orchestra
- 2000 The Tournament, written for harmony and fanfare orchestra
- 2001 Fanfare for the sun, written for harmony orchestra
- 2001 Lord Tullamore, written for harmony, fanfare and brassband orchestra
- 2001 The African Connection, written for harmony, fanfare and brassband orchestra
- 2002 Fanfare for a festival, written for harmony and fanfare orchestra
- 2002 The Legend of Flatheadlake, written for harmony orchestra
- 2002 Tignale, written for harmony orchestra
- 2004 Froonackers Pride, written for harmony and fanfare orchestra
- 2004 Symfonic Sketches, written for clarinet and bass clarinet and harmony orchestra
- 2004 The Power of the Megatsunami, written for harmony, fanfare and brassband orchestra
- 2005 La Scala, written for brassband orchestra
- 2005 Oxygen, written for fanfare orchestra
- 2006 Dancing Ebony, written for clarinet and harmony orchestra
- 2006 The Road to the West, written for harmony, fanfare and brassband orchestra
- 2006 Trimbeka, written for harmony and fanfare orchestra
- 2006 Windkracht 6, written for harmony orchestra
- 2007 De achtse Dei, written for fanfare orchestra
- 2007 Fjoer en Fidúsje, written for fanfare orchestra
- 10 past Q, written for harmony orchestra
- Tutti Advendo, written for harmony orchestra
- La Viuda Negra, required piece for the fourth division of the Dutch Brassband Championship in 2010
- 2014 Van Oranje, written for harmony, fanfare and brassband orchestra for the 200th birthday of the Kingdom of the Netherlands
- 2017 The Journey of the Half Moon, written for the New York City International Music Festival
- 2024 Behind the Moon, written for the New York City International Music Festival
