= Johan Gustaf von Carlsson =

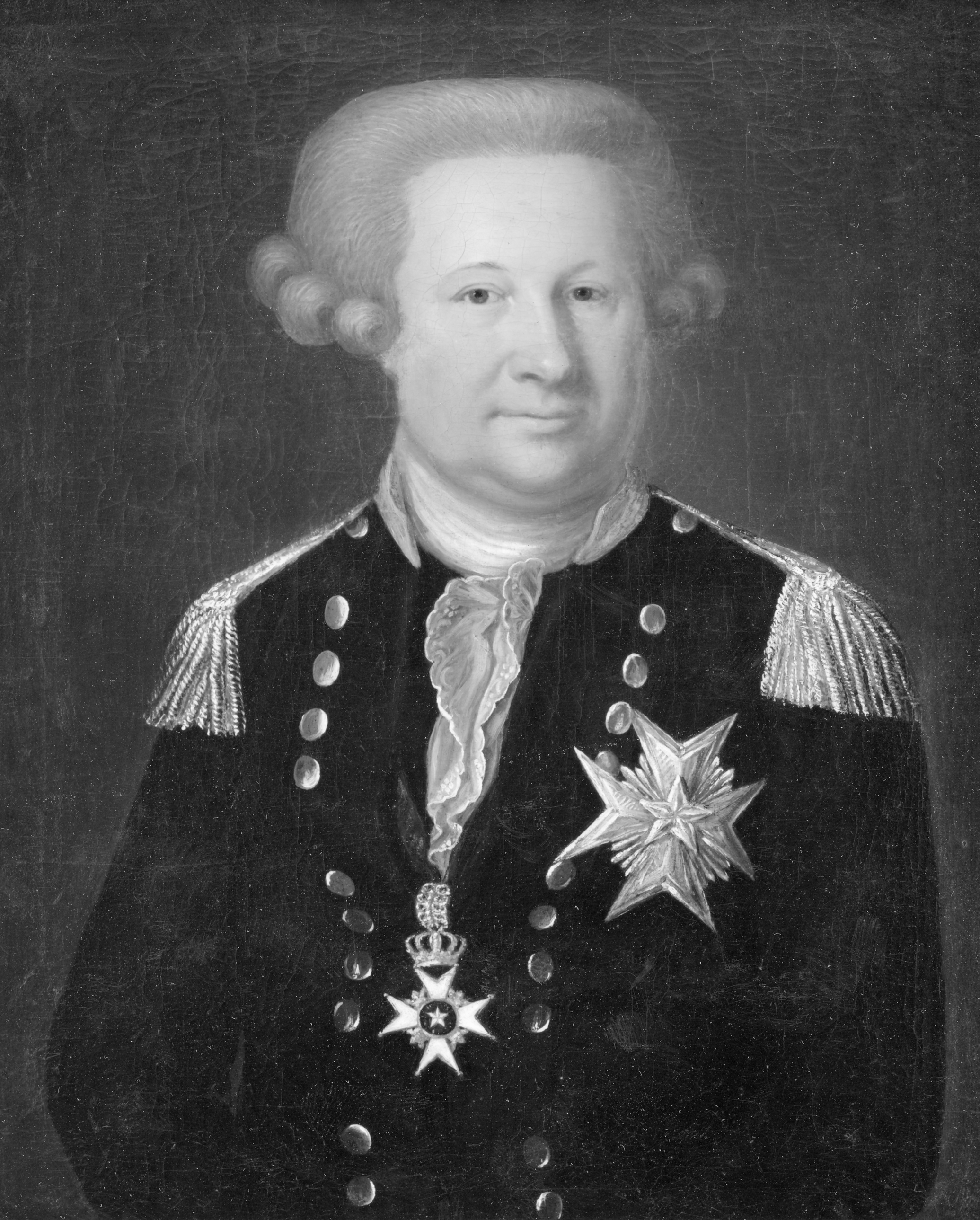

Johan Gustaf von Carlsson (15 November 1743 – 10 December 1801) was a Swedish official and a collector of natural history specimens.

Von Carlsson was born in Långbro to chamberlain Johan von Carlsson and Maria Lovisin. He was appointed secretary of state in 1781 and president of the Vasa court in 1792. He accumulated a large collection of bird specimens at his estate in Mälby in Södermanland. He bequeathed this to the Academy of Sciences of which he became a member in 1781. He published a catalogue of his collection in collaborations with Anders Sparrman under the title Museum carlsonianum (1786–1789) which was published in five parts.
