= Magnus Carlsson (disambiguation) =

Magnus Carlsson (born 1974) is a Swedish singer.

Magnus Carlsson may also refer to:

- Magnus Carlsson (album), 2006 album by Magnus Carlsson
- Magnus Carlsson (illustrator) (born 1965), Swedish illustrator and animator
- Magnus A. Carlsson (born 1980), Swedish golfer

== See also ==
- Magnus Carlson (born 1968), Swedish singer (Weeping Willows)
- Magnus Carlsen (born 1990), Norwegian chess player
- Magnus Karlsson (disambiguation)
