= Therese Karlsson =

Finnish singer and actor (born 1972)

Ewa Therese Karlsson (born 25 January 1972, Pargas) is a Finnish singer (soprano) and actor. She played the part of Yvette in Brecht's Mutter Courage, Swedish Theatre (Svenska Teatern) 2004. She rose to stardom when she got the title role in Turku City Theatre musical Elisabeth 2005–2006 (with over 50,000 tickets sold it is the greatest success in the history of The Municipal Theatre of Turku). In fall 2010 she began starring in the musical Les Misérables, directed by Georg Malvius, at The Swedish Theatre of Turku (Åbo Svenska Teater).
