= Carl Asercion =

American Hawaiian guitarist (1909–1990)

Carl Asercion (1909–1990) was an American Hawaiian steel guitarist who was most active in the Chicago area.

== Biography ==
Carl Ascercion was born in 1909 in Hawaii. His parents were of Filipino ancestry, his father was a bandmaster in the United States Navy. His first musical instrument was the violin, but he switched to steel guitar at a young age. At the age of eight his family moved to San Diego. His first group was formed when he was in his teens, and was soon performing regularly on the radio. He moved to Chicago, and formed a group entitled "Carl's Hawaiians" which disbanded in 1943 when Asercion was drafted by the U.S. Navy. He entered training at Naval Station Great Lakes. During the war he continued performing at bond drives. After the war he was back in Chicago as "Kalani and the Paradise Islanders", which featured himself as "Kalani" playing a seven-string frypan. His biggest exposure was a weekly radio show that aired on WGN. His group was housed for the greatest length of time at Club Waikiki in Chicago, but was also booked at The Blackstone Hotel, Edgewater Beach Hotel, and The Chase Park Plaza Hotel. He played steel guitar for his own and for other groups (including signing with Sherman Hayes) in club settings in the 1960s, switching billing between "Asercion" and "Kalani" in places as disparate as Florida and Alberta. Some shows also featured Asercion's vocal abilities. In addition to his performing he taught Hawaiian and Spanish guitar. Asercion died in 1990.

== Recordings ==
In 1951, Asercion appeared on Columbia Records as backing artist to Ken Griffin on a single which was later compiled on Griffin's 1962 album "Sugar 'N' Spice". He was the backing group for Eddy Howard's 1957 album "Paradise Isle" on Mercury Records. His group recorded a full album for Replica Records, released in 1957, that prominently featured Asercion's guitar playing.
