= Richard Garrigues =

Richard Garrigues is a naturalist, writer and videographer, originally from suburban New Jersey, who has lived in Costa Rica since 1981, where he leads birding and natural history tours. Since April 2000, he has been posting the Gone Birding Newsletter online. In June 2005 he also began to study the birds of northwestern Ecuador.

== Published works ==
- The Birds of Costa Rica, illustrated by Robert Dean, 2007 (ISBN 080147373X)
- The birds of Costa Rica, a field guide, Second edition illustrated by Robert Dean, 2014
