= Carl Muckler =

American politician

Member of the U.S. House of Representatives from Missouri's 56th district

Missouri House of Representatives
- Incumbent
- Assumed office 1975

Personal details
- Born: 1941 St. Louis, Missouri
- Died: 2025 (aged 83–84) near Chautauqua, Illinois
- Party: Democratic
- Spouse: Ruth
- Children: 3 (2 sons, 1 daughter)
- Occupation: educator

Carl Henry Muckler (May 13, 1941 - June 15, 2025) was a Democratic politician who served six years in the Missouri House of Representatives. He was born in St. Louis, Missouri, and was educated in Christian Brothers College High School, Saint Mary's University of Minnesota, DePaul University in Chicago, University of Missouri–St. Louis, and the Georgetown University Extension in Salzburg, Austria. On September 2, 1967, he married in St. Louis. He also served in the United States Army. In retirement he often lived in near Buckeye, Arizona, and at his summer home near Chautauqua, Illinois, where he died in 2025.
