= Jim Carlson =

Jim Carlson may refer to:

- Jim Carlson (screenwriter) (1932–2007), American film and television writer
- Jim Carlson (Minnesota politician) (born 1947), Minnesota politician and member of the Minnesota Senate
- Jim Carlson (businessman), American businessman and the 2012 Grassroots Party nominee for President of the United States
