= Kim Karlsson =

Swedish ice hockey player

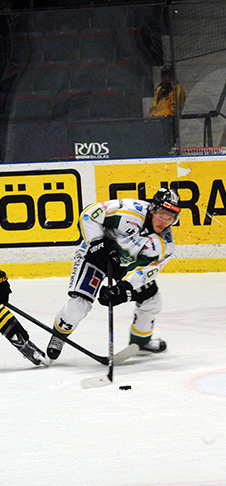
- Born: 31 October 1989 (age 36) Älvsbyn, Sweden
- Height: 5 ft 9 in (175 cm)
- Weight: 165 lb (75 kg; 11 st 11 lb)
- Position: Wing
- Shot: Left
- Played for: Luleå HF
- NHL draft: Undrafted
- Playing career: 2007–2019

Kim Karlsson (born 31 October 1989) is a former Swedish professional ice hockey winger who currently plays for Luleå HF of the Elitserien.

== Career statistics ==
			Regular season					Playoffs
Season	Team	League	GP	G	A	Pts	PIM	GP	G	A	Pts	PIM
2005–06	Luleå HF J18	J18 Elit	—	—	—	—	—	—	—	—	—	—
2006–07	Luleå HF J18	J18 Elit	16	9	7	16	10	—	—	—	—	—
2006–07	Luleå HF J20	J20 SuperElit	31	8	14	22	52	—	—	—	—	—
2007–08	Luleå HF J20	J20 SuperElit	41	11	25	36	48	2	0	0	0	2
2007–08	Luleå HF	Elitserien	3	0	0	0	0	—	—	—	—	—
2008–09	Luleå HF J20	J20 SuperElit	39	10	27	37	67	6	2	3	5	6
2008–09	Luleå HF	Elitserien	5	0	0	0	2	—	—	—	—	—
2008–09	Piteå HC	Division 1	3	0	2	2	2	—	—	—	—	—
2009–10	Comet Halden	Norway	5	3	3	6	4	—	—	—	—	—
2009–10	Almtuna IS	HockeyAllsvenskan	44	8	8	16	8	10	2	1	3	6
2010–11	Luleå HF	Elitserien	55	4	5	9	6	13	0	0	0	4
2011–12	Luleå HF	Elitserien	36	2	1	3	16	3	0	0	0	2
2012–13	Tingsryds AIF	HockeyAllsvenskan	48	13	17	30	16	10	1	5	6	0
2013–14	IF Björklöven	HockeyAllsvenskan	39	3	12	15	16	10	2	6	8	6
2014–15	IF Björklöven	HockeyAllsvenskan	51	9	16	25	20	—	—	—	—	—
2015–16	IF Björklöven	HockeyAllsvenskan	40	9	19	28	12	—	—	—	—	—
2016–17	IF Björklöven	HockeyAllsvenskan	36	7	10	17	8	—	—	—	—	—
2017–18	IF Björklöven	HockeyAllsvenskan	11	0	1	1	4	—	—	—	—	—
2017–18	SC Langenthal	SL	29	13	18	31	20	10	5	4	9	4
2018–19	SC Langenthal	SL	30	2	10	12	34	—	—	—	—	—
2018–19	Esbjerg Energy	Denmark	12	2	7	9	8	2	0	1	1	0
Elitserien totals			99	6	6	12	24	16	0	0	0	6
HockeyAllsvenskan totals			269	49	83	132	84	35	6	12	18	44
SL totals			59	15	28	43	54	10	5	4	9	4
