= Peter Karlsson (ice hockey) =

Swedish ice hockey player

- Born: 17 February 1966 Västerås, Sweden
- Died: 11 March 1995 (aged 29) Västerås, Sweden
- Height: 5 ft 10 in (178 cm)
- Weight: 194 lb (88 kg; 13 st 12 lb)
- Position: Defence
- Shot: Left
- Played for: Västerås IK
- Playing career: 1984–1995

Lars Peter Karlsson (17 February 1966 – 11 March 1995) was a Swedish professional ice hockey player.

== Playing career ==
Karlsson was born in Västerås Lundby, Västmanland. He began his ice hockey career with VIK Västerås HK in the First Division. After five seasons, he then had spells with Surahammars IF and IK Westmannia-Köping before returning to Västerås for his one and only Elitserien season. He returned to Division One for Avesta BK and Örebro IK.

== Death ==
Peter Karlsson was murdered on the night of 11 March 1995 in Västerås by a 19-year-old man he encountered while walking. His attacker, a 19-year-old white power skinhead, claimed that the two men had begun walking in the same direction and at some point, Karlsson made sexual advances towards him. Karlsson was stabbed 64 times in the face, head, neck, chest and back with a knife. A responding police officer who had coached Karlsson in his youth was unable to identify him due to the extent of his injuries. It was later found that Karlsson's attacker possessed anti-LGBT propaganda in his home. After the murder, Karlsson's team played a protest match in support of him. The killer's sentence, which was eight years, outraged some in the Swedish gay community who thought that the murder occurred because of Karlsson's sexuality. Karlsson was not openly gay, but had discussed his homosexuality with attendees of a nightclub the night previously.

== Career statistics ==
			Regular season					Playoffs
Season	Team	League	GP	G	A	Pts	PIM	GP	G	A	Pts	PIM
1983–84	IK VIK Hockey	Div.1	1	0	0	0	0	—	—	—	—	—
1984–85	IK VIK Hockey	Div.1	9	0	0	0	6	2	0	0	0	0
1985–86	IK VIK Hockey	Div.1	25	1	11	12	8	13	0	2	2	0
1986–87	IK VIK Hockey	Div.1	10	0	2	2	8	—	—	—	—	—
1987–88	IK VIK Hockey	Div.1	12	2	1	3	6	—	—	—	—	—
1988–89	Surahammars IF	Div.1	31	7	6	13	14	—	—	—	—	—
1989–90	IK Westmannia	Div.2	29	3	16	19	12	8	2	5	7	2
1990–91	IK Westmannia-Köping	Div.1	32	0	11	11	28	—	—	—	—	—
1991–92	IK Westmannia-Köping	Div.1	32	1	13	14	28	3	0	1	1	0
1992–93	Västerås IK	SEL	15	0	1	1	8	—	—	—	—	—
1992–93	IK Westmannia-Köping	Div.1	18	2	6	8	10	—	—	—	—	—
1993–94	Avesta BK	Div.1	30	2	3	5	28	—	—	—	—	—
1994–95	Örebro IK	Div.1	27	0	3	3	10	—	—	—	—	—
SEL totals			15	0	1	1	8	—	—	—	—	—

== See also ==
- Gay panic defense
- List of ice hockey players who died during their playing career
