= Magnus Karlsson (bandy) =

Swedish bandy player (born 1984)

Magnus Karlsson (born April 7, 1984) is a Swedish bandy player who currently plays for GAIS Bandyklubb as a defender, midfielder or half back.

Magnus has played for three clubs. They are:

Nässjö IF (2001-2005)
Vetlanda BK (2005-2009)
GAIS Bandyklubb (2009-)
