= Dr. Paul Carlson Park =

Park in Culver City

Coordinates: 34.013706°N 118.397942°W

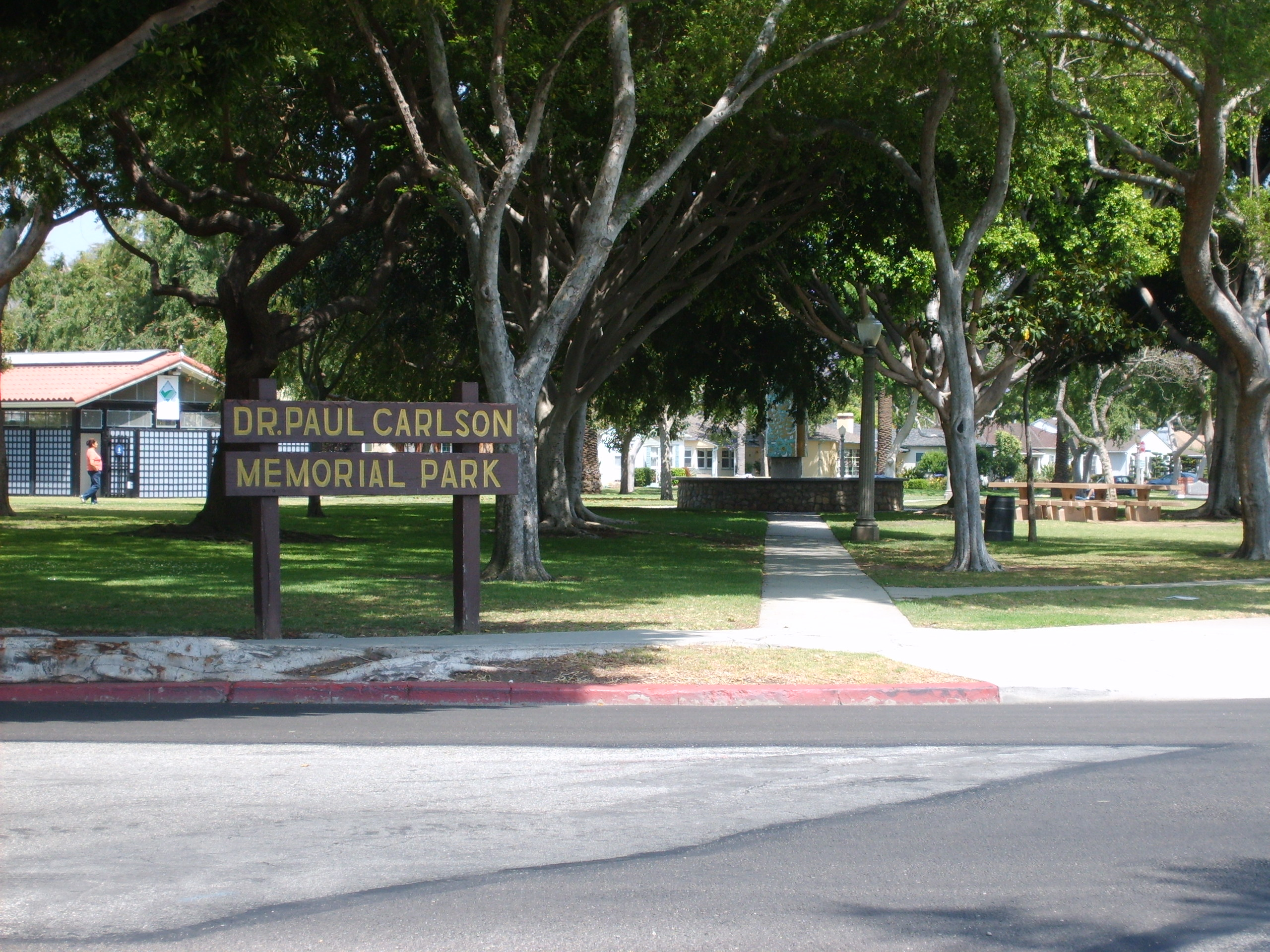
Carlson Park

Dr. Paul Carlson Park, or, more commonly, Carlson Park, is a small park located in the Carlson Park neighborhood of Culver City, California. It is linear in shape and intended for passive recreational use, featuring open grassy spaces as well as picnic and barbecue facilities. It is named for Dr. Paul Carlson, a former resident of Culver City whose martyrdom in the Democratic Republic of the Congo in 1964 attracted national attention.

In the summer, Culver City Public Theater gives free public theatrical performances in the park.

== History ==
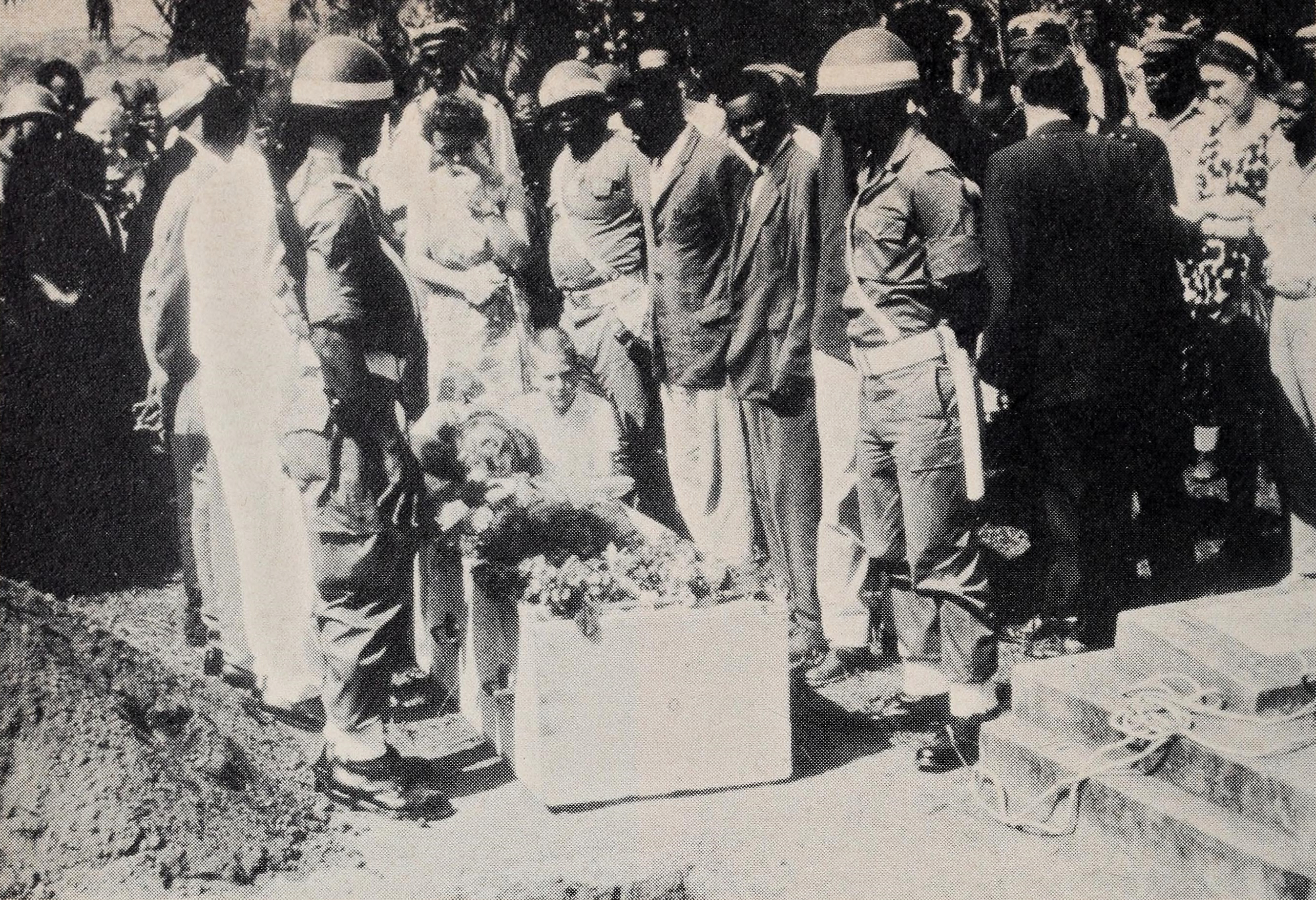
Paul Carlson's funeral service, Congo

Following development as a horse racing track and later as an auto raceway, the City Council of the City of Culver City voted in 1927 to dedicate the space to the development of the first park in Culver City. Initially called Victory Park, so named because the mayor's wife believed "it was a victory to get a park," the park was renamed shortly after Dr. Carlson's death.

Over the years, a number of renovation and modernization projects undertaken by the Culver City Department of Parks, Recreation and Community Services have targeted Carlson Park, including the recent construction of a new bathroom structure.

== Amenities ==
According to the Culver City Department of Parks, Recreation and Community Services Carlson Park webpage, Carlson Park features the following amenities:

- Restroom facilities
- Picnic shelter with 4 sixteen-foot picnic tables
  - Maximum capacity: 50
  - Permits available 9a-6p, 7 days a week
- 4 barbecues
- 2 fireplaces
- Large passive grass area

== Geography ==
Carlson Park covers an area of 2.66 acres in the center of the Carlson Park residential neighborhood. It is bounded by Braddock Drive, Motor Avenue, Le Bourget Avenue, and Park Avenue.

== See also ==
- List of Culver City municipal parks
