= Eric Carlson (architect) =

American architect

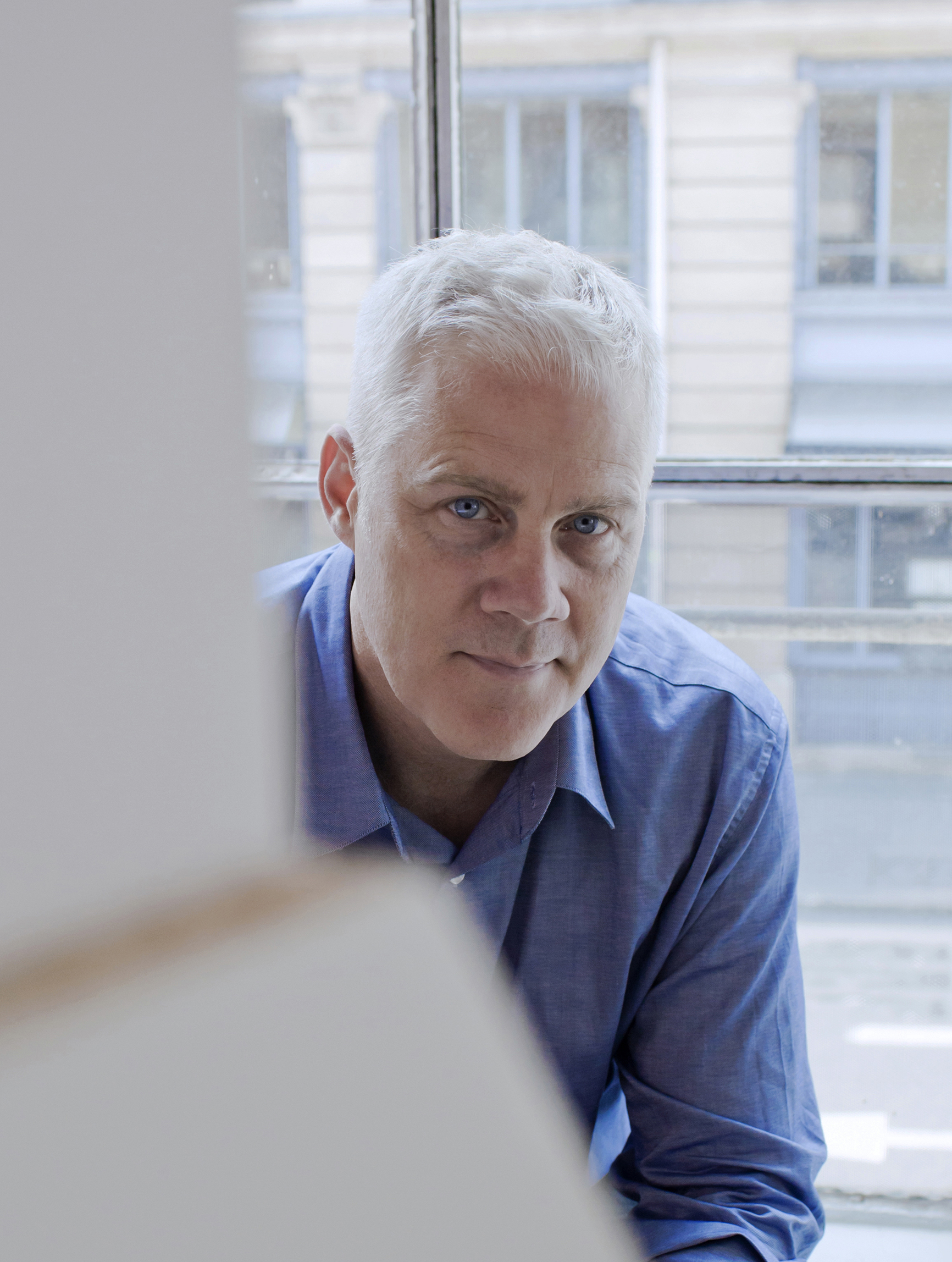
- Born: 1963 (age 62–63); Ann Arbor, Michigan, U.S.
- Occupation: Architect
- Practice: Carbondale, Paris
- Design: Luxury architecture
- Website: www.cbdarch.com/en/

Eric Carlson (born 1963) is an American architect. His practice, Carbondale, is located in Paris, France. He is most recognized for his design, both interior and exterior, of the Louis Vuitton store located on the Champs-Élysées, Paris's 7th most visited destination.

== Life and career ==
Carlson was born in Ann Arbor, Michigan. After receiving his diploma in architecture he moved to San Francisco to work with architects in America's "New Urbanism" movement. His architectural expertise was further refined upon his arrival to Europe, participating as a guest lecturer/critic at DSG Harvard University, the University of California, Tulane University and the Architectural Association School of Architecture in London. In 1997, Carlson co-founded the Louis Vuitton Architecture Department, establishing his own firm, Carbondale, in 2004, joined by Pierre Tortrat in 2006 and Pierre Marescaux in 2015.

A wide variety of projects designed by Carbondale, ranging from urban design, building architectural to interior architecture and furniture design, within settings throughout Europe, the Americas, Asia and Oceania. The office is said to be the first to bring architecture to luxury brands, notably with designs for the prominent Louis Vuitton building on the Champs Elysées in Paris, as well as boutiques for Dolce & Gabbana, Celine, TAG Heuer, Longchamp, H.Stern, Tiffany & Co. and Paspaley pearls. Recent creations include the Galaria Canalejas Interior in Madrid, the Dolce & Gabbana Palazzo Torres in Venice and the Iguatemi Plaza Atrium and Piselli Restaurant in São Paulo.

== Principle designs ==
- Dolce & Gabbana Rome, Italy 2019
- Palazzo Dolce & Gabbana, Venice, Italy 2017
- Dolce & Gabbana Flagship Montecarlo, Monaco, 2017
- Île Saint-Louis Residence, Paris, France, 2017
- Longchamp Paris Maison, Paris France, 2016
- Piselli Sud, São Paulo, Brazil, 2015
- Iguatemi Public Plaza, São Paulo, Brazil, 2015
- Iguatemi Skylight, São Paulo, Brazil, 2015
- BMW Manhattan Showroom, New York, USA, 2014
- Longchamp, New Bond Street, London, Great Britain, 2014
- Paspaley Pearls, Brisbane, Australia, 2014
- Paspaley Pearls, Melbourne, Australia, 2013
- BMW Parklane Showroom, London, UK, 2013
- H Stern Flagship, Seoul, South Korea, 2013
- Tre Bicchieri, São Paulo, Brazil, 2012
- JK Iguatemi Shopping Center, São Paulo, Brazil, 2012
- Longchamp Maison, Canton Road, Kowloon, China, 2012
- H Stern Takashimaya, Shanghai, China, 2012
- BMW Brand Store, Paris, 2012
- Tag Heuer Flagship Store, Las Vegas, US, 2011
- Longchamp Flagship Store, Madison Avenue New York, Düsseldorf, Knokke, 2009–2010
- Escada Headquarters, Munich, Germany, 2008
- Apartment "Stretch", Paris, France, 2008
- Tag Heuer Flagship Store, London, Great Britain, 2008
- Tag Heuer Headquarters, La Chaux De Fonds, Switzerland, 2007
- Tiffany Façade, Tokyo, Japan, 2007
- Museum 360°, La Chaux De Fonds, Switzerland, 2007
- Penthouse Apartments, Aoyama, Tokyo, Japan, 2006
- Riverain Commercial Center, Fukuoka, Japan, 2006
- Marina Luxury Lofts, Ibiza, Espagne, 2005
- Public Plaza and Commercial, Office & Residential spaces, Abu Dhabi, Uae, 2005
- Plaza Ecija, Ecija (Sevilla), Spain, 2005
- Takashimaya Department Store, Shinjuku, Tokyo, Japan, 2005
- Louis Vuitton Maison, Champs Elysees, Paris, France, 2005
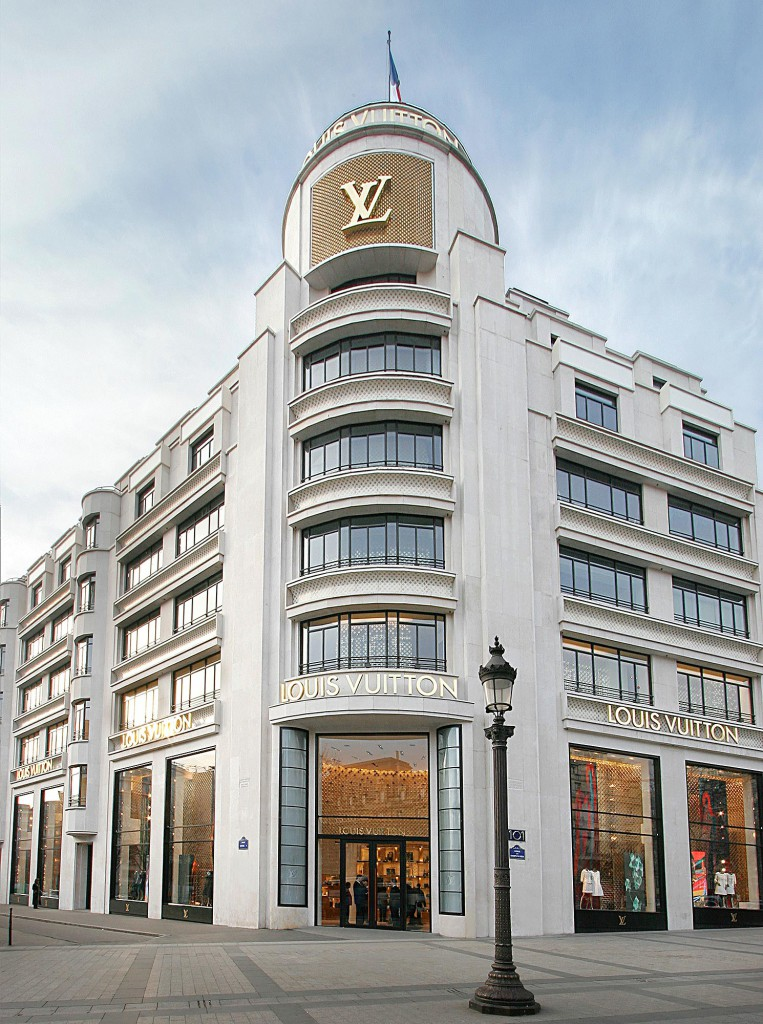
  Louis Vuitton Building - Avenue des Champs Elysees
- Céline, Avenue Montaigne, Paris, France, 2004
- Louis Vuitton, Nagoya, Roppongi Hills Tokyo, Ginza Tokyo, Omotesando Tokyo, LV Building, Seoul, 2002–2007
- Club Celux, Tokyo, Japan, 2003

== Awards and honours ==
- UNESCO's Prix Versailles "Best Retail Interior Design, Worldwide", Palazzo Dolce & Gabbana Venice; 2018
- UNESCO's Prix Versailles "Best Retail Interior Design, Europe", Palazzo Dolce & Gabbana Venice; 2018
- "Best Designers of 2013", Tre Bicchierie Restaurant - São Paulo, Architecture Digest Collector Series; 2013
- "Australian Made Award", ASOFIA, Paspaley Melbourne Flagship store, Australia; 2013
- "Best International Project", Lighting Design Awards, BMW Showroom, Paris; 2013
- "Asia's Top 10 Best Retail Interior Design Projects", La Maison Longchamp, Hong Kong, Perspective magazine's; 2013
- "Interior of the Year 2013" Victoria Australia, ASOFIA, Paspaley Melbourne Flagship store; 2013
- "Best Designers of 2010", Aoyama Residence, Tokyo, Architecture Digest (AD), 2010
- "The Award for Rarity" for achievements in Luxury Design and Architecture from the Centre du Luxe et de la Creation, Paris; 2010
- "The Most Beautiful Creation in Metal" for the Interior design of the Louis Vuitton Champs Elysees Building, from the French Metallic Construction Institute; 2006
- "The Outstanding Design Award" from the Seoul Metropolitan Government for the design of the Cheongdam-Dong building, Seoul, South Korea; 2001

== Exhibitions ==
- Architecture Furniture, 1960-2020. Cité de L'Architecture & du Patrimoine. Exhibition, Paris; 2019
- "DG Evolution", Design Week Milan; 2017
- "10 Furniture Projects", Exhibition, Paris; 2010
- "Inclusive", Exhibition at Aedes Gallery, Berlin & Milk Gallery, New York; 2004
- "Logique / Visuelle", Exhibition, Omotesando, Tokyo; 2003
