= Peter Karlsson (footballer, born 1973) =

Swedish footballer

Personal information
- Date of birth: 11 August 1973 (age 53)
- Position: Midfielder

Senior career*
Years	Team	Apps	(Gls)
1990–2001	Örebro SK		
- * Club domestic league appearances and goals

Peter Karlsson (born 11 August 1973) is a Swedish retired football midfielder.
