= Carl Kline (psychiatrist) =

Canadian psychiatrist (1915–2005)

Carl L. Kline (1915–2005) was an American born Canadian psychiatrist and researcher.

== Early life and education ==
Kline was born in St. Paul, Minnesota, US, and moved to Vancouver, British Columbia, Canada, in 1967 with his family. He studied at Northwestern Medical School, St. Elizabeth's Hospital and Duke University School of Medicine.

== Career ==
Kline served as a lieutenant commander in the United States Navy Medical Corps from 1940 to 1945. Kline's direct exposure to the psychological trauma due to how war inflicted on soldiers led him to become fascinated with psychiatry. In the 1960s, Kline worked as psychiatrist in his private practice in Wisconsin. There he became involved with organizations that embraced social and human rights of individuals. His opposition to the Vietnam War moved him and his family to Canada. In Vancouver, Kline became known as Canada's first Children's Aid Society psychiatrist. Kline became a member of the Canadian Royal College of Physicians and Surgeons, Certified in Psychiatry. He was a clinical professor in the Department of Psychiatry at UBC, and upon retirement he was appointed clinical professor emeritus.

In 1991, Kline and his wife Carolyn were recipients of the Samuel T. Orton Award.

== Publications ==
Kline published works on child psychiatry, adolescent psychiatry, and dyslexia appearing in more than 60 professional journals worldwide.
