= Karlson =

Karlson is a patronymic surname meaning "son of Karl". There are other spelling variations.

== People with surname Karlson or Karlsons ==
- Christian Thomsen Carl, also referred to as Karlson (1676–1713), Danish navy officer
- Ģirts Karlsons (born 1981), Latvian football player
- Patrik Karlson (born 1987), Swedish politician
- Peter Karlson, German chemist, 1974 Feldberg Foundation prize recipient
- Phil Karlson (1908–1982), American film noir director

== See also ==
- Carlsen (disambiguation)
- Carlson (disambiguation)
- Carlsson (disambiguation)
- Karlsson (disambiguation)
- Karlson creek, California
- Jacob Karlzon
- Ģirts Karlsons
