= Carl Garrigus =

American gridiron football player (1931–1975)

Profile
- Position: Quarterback

Personal information
- Born: September 2, 1931; Miami, Florida, U.S.
- Died: November 17, 1975 (aged 44); Miami, Florida, U.S.
- Listed height: 5 ft 10 in (1.78 m)
- Listed weight: 192 lb (87 kg)

Career information
- College: Miami (1951–1954)

Career history
- 1955: Hamilton Tiger-Cats

Carl E. Garrigus (September 2, 1931 – November 17, 1975) was an American professional football quarterback who played one season with the Hamilton Tiger-Cats of the Canadian Football League (CFL). He played college football and baseball at the University of Miami.

== Early life ==
Carl E. Garrigus was born on September 2, 1931, in Miami, Florida. He attended Fort Lauderdale High School in Fort Lauderdale, Florida.

== College career ==
Garrigus was a member of the Miami Hurricanes of the University of Miami from 1951 to 1954. He was a letterman in 1952 and 1954. He completed 27 of 47 passes for 305 yards and two touchdowns as a senior in 1954. Garrigus also played baseball for the Hurricanes.

== Professional career ==
Garrigus played in 11 games for the Hamilton Tiger-Cats of the Canadian Football League in 1955, completing 23 of 37 passes (62.2%) for 308 yards and three interceptions while rushing 35 times for 226 yards and two touchdowns. He also had one defensive interception for 19 yards and one punt return for four yards.

== Personal life ==
Garrigus was a high school football coach after his playing career. He died on November 17, 1975, in Miami due to injuries suffered in a car crash.
