= Carlsen (disambiguation) =

Carlsen may also refer to:

== People ==
- Carlsen, people with the surname

== Places ==
- Carlsen Air Force Base, a United States military facility in Trinidad
- Carlsen Island, part of the Svalbard archipelago

== Organisations ==
- Carlsen Verlag, a Danish publishing house

== See also ==
- Carlson (disambiguation)
