= April 1965 =

Month of 1965

<<	April 1965					>>
Su	Mo	Tu	We	Th	Fr	Sa
				1	2	3
4	5	6	7	8	9	10
11	12	13	14	15	16	17
18	19	20	21	22	23	24
25	26	27	28	29	30

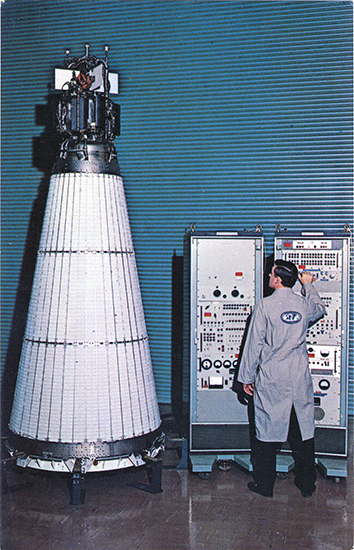
April 3, 1965: U.S. puts a nuclear reactor in orbit

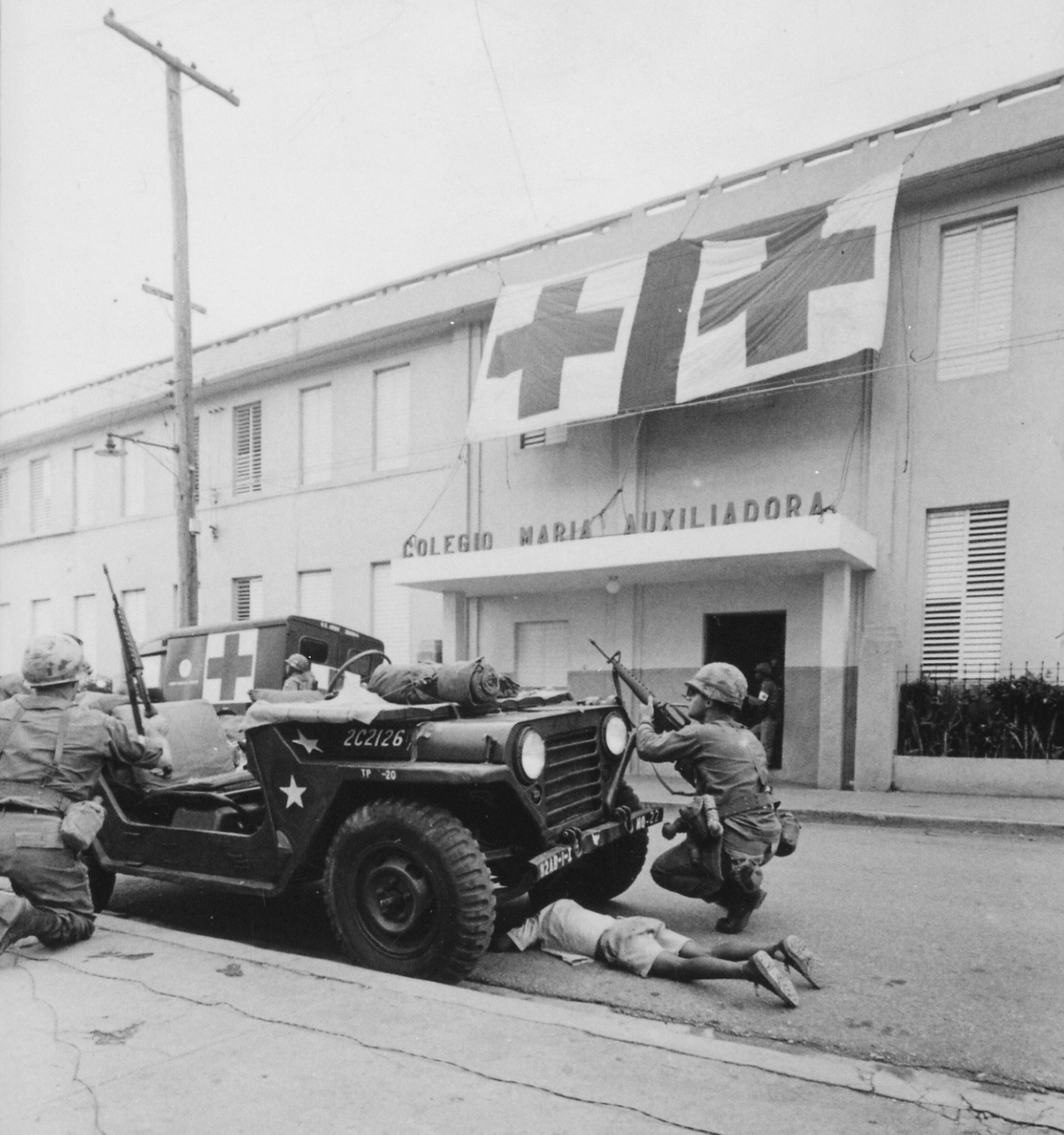
April 30, 1965: U.S. invades Dominican Republic

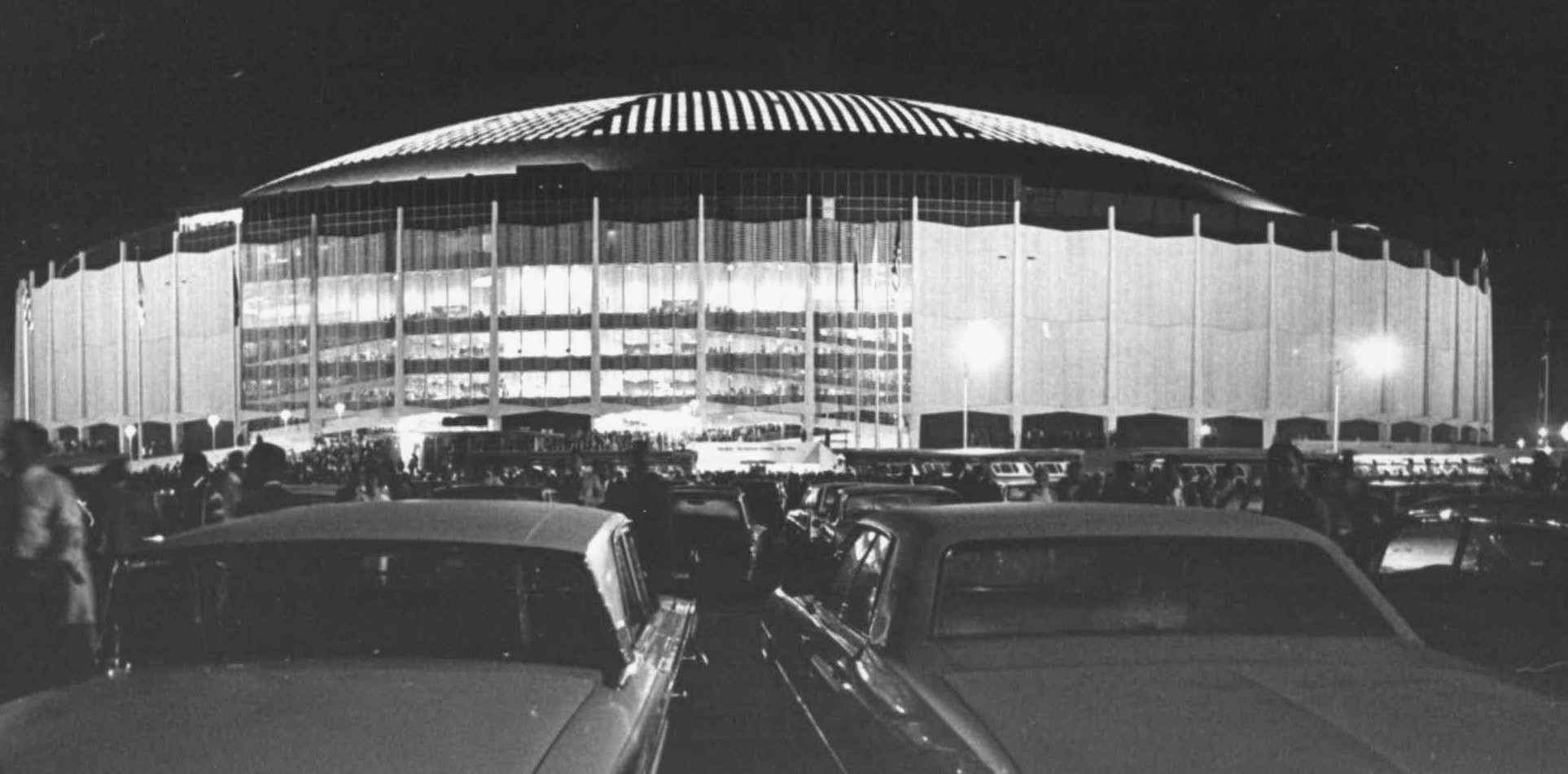
April 9, 1965: First domed stadium opens to the public

The following events occurred in April 1965:

== April 1, 1965 (Thursday) ==
- U.S. President Lyndon Johnson authorized a change in the U.S. Marines' mission in South Vietnam, a month after the first units had been sent to protect installations at Da Nang from attack. For the first time, American ground troops were scheduled to move into the surrounding area and to engage Viet Cong and North Vietnamese forces in combat.
- In the United Kingdom, the Greater London Council came into power, replacing the London County Council and greatly expanding the metropolitan area of the city.
- The Man with the Golden Gun, Ian Fleming's thirteenth James Bond novel, was first published by Jonathan Cape, being published eight months after Ian's death.
- The last of the Titan I intercontinental ballistic missiles were taken off alert, as the United States began reliance on the new Atlas missiles.
- Tasman Empire Airways Limited (TEAL), established on April 26, 1940, changed its name to Air New Zealand.
- Born: Mark Jackson, American basketball player for 17 years in the NBA, for seven teams, and NBA coach for three years; in Brooklyn
- Died: Helena Rubinstein, 92, Polish-American cosmetics entrepreneur and businesswoman

== April 2, 1965 (Friday) ==
- Prime Minister Zhou Enlai of the People's Republic of China met with Pakistan's President, Mohammed Ayub Khan, and presented a four-point statement on the Vietnam War to forward to U.S. President Johnson, in that the U.S. and Communist China had no diplomatic relations. Via Khan, Zhou informed Johnson that his nation would not provoke a war with the United States, but an American ground invasion of North Vietnam would risk war with China. Zhou added that China was ready to provide aid to "any country opposing U.S. aggression"; and that China was prepared to use nuclear weapons to defend its territory. "Once the war breaks out," the statement concluded, "it will have no boundaries."
- The annual private conference of the Bilderberg Group, composed of top bankers and politicians from North America and Europe, began at Villa d'Este, Italy. Because of the secrecy of the proceedings and the importance of the participants, critics of the Group suspect it of promoting a world government. The topics of the 1965 discussions were "Monetary cooperation in the Western world" and "The state of the Atlantic Alliance".
- A musical adaptation of the John Reed book Ten Days That Shook the World, presented by Soviet theatrical producer Yuri Lyubimov, was performed for the first time, at the Taganka Theatre in Moscow. Loosely based on the events of the 1917 Revolution, Desyat' dnei, kotorye potryasli mir was billed as "a popular performance in two parts with mime, circus, buffoonery and shootings".
- Morocco won the five-nation African basketball championship tournament, authorized by FIBA, the Fédération Internationale de Basketball Amateur. Morocco, Tunisia, Algeria, Senegal, and Libya played at Tunis in a round robin format, with Morocco beating those teams, respectively, 70–57, 83–39, 59–44 and 79–45.
- Born: Rodney King, American taxi driver and central figure in the 1992 Los Angeles riots; in Sacramento, California (d. 2012)
- Died: Krishna Kumarsinhji Bhavsinhji, 52, Indian monarch and politician, last Maharaja of the Bhavnagar State and first Governor of Madras State (now Tamil Nadu)

== April 3, 1965 (Saturday) ==
- The first jet-to-jet combat of the Vietnam War took place when four U.S. Navy F-8E Crusaders from the USS Hancock carried out a mission against the Thanh Hóa Bridge, and were engaged by eight MiG-17 fighters from the 921st Sao Do Regiment of the North Vietnamese Air Force. One of the F-8Es, piloted by Lieutenant Commander Spence Thomas, was set on fire by cannons fired from a MiG-17 piloted by NVAF Captain Pham Ngoc Lan, but Thomas was able to land safely at Da Nang. Ngoc Lan ran out of fuel and survived a crash landing. In future years, April 3 would be a Vietnamese public holiday commemorated as "Air Force Day".
- SNAP-10A, the first nuclear reactor launched into space, and the only one ever sent by the United States, was sent aloft from Vandenberg AFB, California, and placed into an orbit 815 miles (1,312 km) above the Earth. "SNAP" was an acronym for Systems for Nuclear Auxiliary Power. The cesium-fueled ion engine would be shut down after 43 days "to permit the radioactive material in the reactor to decay to safe levels... before the spacecraft reenters the atmosphere", according to a spokesman, which was not expected to happen for 3,000 years.
- The longest session of parliament in Canada's history ended at 3:00 in the morning in Ottawa, after holding its 249th and final sitting day since opening on February 18, 1964. Only 50 of the 265 members of the House of Commons, and just 30 Senators, remained at the close, with plans to open a new session on Monday.
- Born: Nazia Hassan, Pakistani singer-songwriter known as the "Queen of South Asian Pop"; in Karachi (died of lung cancer, 2000)
- Died: Ray Enright, 69, American director of 73 films between 1927 and 1953

== April 4, 1965 (Sunday) ==
- The coronation of Palden Thondup Namgyal as the King of Sikkim took place at a Buddhist chapel in Gangtok, the capital of the protectorate of India, as Sikkim's 170,000 citizens were permitted to watch on a special television circuit. Palden, who had succeeded upon the death of his father, Tashi Namgyal, on December 2, 1963, was crowned Chogyal and his wife, the former Miss Hope Cooke of San Francisco, wore the crown of the gyalmo (Queen consort). The monarchy would be abolished almost ten years to the day afterward, on April 10, 1975, and Sikkim would become the 23rd state of India.
- During a U.S. Air Force strike on the Thanh Hóa Bridge, Vietnam People's Air Force MiG-17 fighters attacked a formation of U.S. Air Force F-105 Thunderchief strike aircraft, shooting down two F-105s. Captain James Magnusson and Major Frank Bennett were both killed when their jets, the first aircraft lost in air-to-air combat by either side during the Vietnam War, were downed.
- Born:
  - Elaine Zayak, former U.S. figure skater who overcame the loss of part of her left foot to win the women's world figure skating championship in 1982; in Paramus, New Jersey
  - Robert Downey Jr., American film star best known for his portrayal of Tony Stark as Iron Man; in Manhattan

== April 5, 1965 (Monday) ==
- The FBI arrested former U.S. Army Sergeant James Allen Mintkenbaugh, who had been spying for the Soviet KGB intelligence agency, in Castro Valley, California. In his confession, Mintkenbaugh identified a high-level U.S. Department of Defense employee, Sergeant Robert Lee Johnson, as his partner in espionage since 1953. Later in the day, Johnson was arrested while working at his desk inside The Pentagon. Sergeant Johnson, unhappy in being passed over for a promotion, had supplied his Soviet handlers with details of American nuclear missiles, classified documents and photographs, and a sample of rocket fuel, and received $25,000 in return. On July 30, 1965, he and Mintkenbaugh would be sentenced to 25 years in prison. Johnson would serve only seven years before being stabbed to death in 1972.
- A U.S. Navy RF-8 Crusader reconnaissance aircraft photographed an SA-2 Guideline surface-to-air missile (SAM) site under construction in North Vietnam for the first time. The discovery, 15 miles (24 km) southeast of Hanoi, of an antiaircraft system that could fire the SA-2 guided missile "sent shivers down the spines of task force commanders and line aviators alike", a historian would note later, but official permission to attack a site so close to the capital of North Vietnam would not be given "until the Navy and Air Force lost a few jets to the SA-2s".
- At the 37th Academy Awards, My Fair Lady won eight Academy Awards, including Best Picture and Best Director. Rex Harrison won an Oscar for Best Actor. Mary Poppins took home five Oscars. Julie Andrews won an Academy Award for Best Actress, for her portrayal in the role. The Sherman Brothers received two Oscars including Best Song, "Chim Chim Cher-ee".
- Manned Spacecraft Center announced that Walter M. Schirra, Jr., and Thomas P. Stafford had been selected as command pilot and pilot for Gemini 6, the first Project Gemini rendezvous and docking mission. Virgil I. Grissom and John W. Young would be the backup crew.

== April 6, 1965 (Tuesday) ==
- Early Bird, a communications satellite, was launched as the first offering of the private Intelsat (International Telecommunications Satellite Consortium, initially a group of 11 member nations). "This launch marks the beginning of the global village linked instantaneously by commercial communications satellites", an author would note later. Early Bird would be moved to a stationary geosynchronous orbit, 22,300 miles (35,900 km) above the Atlantic Ocean, on May 2. With 240 available circuits, the satellite could "relay signals in either direction between Europe and the United States virtually on a twenty-four-hour basis"; a satellite TV broadcast would reduce the available capacity for long-distance telephone and telegraph links by 75 percent.
- The United Kingdom enacted its first capital gains tax, a tax upon the profit realized from the sale of assets based on the sale price, minus the BDV (the "Budget Day Value" being the value of the property on April 6, 1965); the law initially applied to real estate and buildings.
- The British government publicly announced cancellation of the BAC TSR-2 nuclear bomber aircraft project.
- Born:
  - Rica Reinisch, East German swimmer who set the world records for the women's 100 meter and 200 meter backstroke at the age of 15; in Seifhennersdorf
  - Black Francis (stage name for Charles Thompson IV), American alternative rock singer and songwriter; in Boston, Massachusetts

== April 7, 1965 (Wednesday) ==
- U.S. President Lyndon Johnson delivered the "Peace Without Conquest" speech at Johns Hopkins University, explaining the reasons for the escalation of the American involvement in the Vietnam War. An author would note later that, "While the speech at Johns Hopkins provided short-term gains, it proved counterproductive in the long run, for it began the erosion of Johnson's credibility, which eventually derailed his presidency." Johnson offered "unconditional discussions" with North Vietnam for peace, emphasizing that there was the condition of keeping South Vietnam independent and non-Communist. He also pledged a one billion dollar investment, the Lower Mekong Basin Project, comparing the endeavor to the Tennessee Valley Authority development.
- Australia's Prime Minister Robert Menzies decided to commit 800 Army troops from the 1st Battalion to the Vietnam War, despite not consulting with the full cabinet. Menzies would not announce the decision in Parliament until April 29, a day after the media broke the story.
- Canada's Prime Minister Lester Pearson and his Liberal Party government won a vote of no confidence brought by the New Democratic Party. The measure failed, 84–129, when 24 members of other parties joined the 105 Liberals voting against the motion.
- In the 1965 parliamentary election for 144 seats in the Dáil Éireann, the first to be covered on television, the ruling Fianna Fáil party obtained an additional two legislators, giving it a majority of exactly one-half, with 72 seats.
- Born: Bill Bellamy, American comedian; in Newark, New Jersey

== April 8, 1965 (Thursday) ==
- A plot to overthrow the leaders of Bulgaria was foiled by the arrest of the commander of the Bulgarian Army garrison in Sofia, Major General Tsvyatko Anev. Ivan Todorov-Gorunia, a member of the Bulgarian Communist Party Central Committee and the leader of the nine-man conspiracy, committed suicide before he could be caught. The plan, co-ordinated by a group of party officials and military leaders, was to force the overthrow of Secretary General Todor Zhivkov and his allies at the April 14 Central Committee meeting. Ultimately, more than 250 military officers were dismissed and 192 members of the Party were imprisoned.
- At the United Nations General Assembly in New York, North Vietnam's Prime Minister Pham Van Dong delivered his nation's "Four Points" plan for ending the Vietnam War, as drafted by a team of foreign relations officials under his leadership and that of President Ho Chi Minh, Communist Party First Secretary Le Duan, and Foreign Minister Nguyen Duy Trinh. The North Vietnamese demands were unacceptable to the United States and South Vietnam, primarily because they were based on the Viet Cong provisions for "the peaceful reunification of Vietnam without foreign intervention".
- A mutiny by 20 young officers ousted Admiral Chung Tấn Cang as commander of the South Vietnamese Navy in an action "that evidently had the government's blessing". The military junta governing South Vietnam did not order a response, and one U.S. official commented that Cang, an associate of recently ousted President Nguyen Khanh, "has been a thorn in our side", because of his lack of cooperation in moving military supplies.
- The Merger Treaty (or "Brussels Treaty"), a European treaty which combined the executive bodies of the European Coal and Steel Community (ECSC), the European Atomic Energy Community (Euratom) and the European Economic Community (EEC) into a single institutional structure, was signed in Brussels. It would enter into force on July 1, 1967, after being ratified by the six member nations.
- The U.S. House of Representatives voted 313–115 to approve the Medicare program, and sent the bill on to the U.S. Senate. The vote came after only one day of debate. With 513 amendments, the bill would pass the U.S. Senate, 70–24, on July 28, and be signed into law on July 30.
- India and Pakistan clashed at the border between their two nations around the disputed Rann of Kutch, with Pakistani troops attacking police posts in the western Indian state of Gujarat, and Indian troops striking at guard posts in the southeastern Pakistani province of Sindh.
- China's President Liu Shaoqi hosted North Vietnam's Le Duan in Beijing, and made a commitment for military and economic aid to Hanoi, including the supply of Chinese pilots to provide defense against U.S. bombing.
- Two U.S. Navy F-4B Phantom fighters flew into Chinese airspace and were tracked by radar flying over the Yulin Naval Base on Hainan Island, but departed before the Chinese military could respond to an alert.
- The Soviet Union and Poland renewed the "Treaty of Friendship, Cooperation, and Mutual Assistance" that they had signed on April 21, 1945.
- Died:
  - Major General John K. Hester, 48, commander of the U.S. 17th Air Force at Ramstein Air Force Base in West Germany, died five days after being seriously injured during a parachute jump.
  - Lars Hanson, 78, Swedish stage and film star

== April 9, 1965 (Friday) ==
- In Houston, the Harris County Domed Stadium (later known as the Astrodome) opened with an exhibition baseball game between the Houston Astros and the New York Yankees. The game, the first Major League Baseball contest to be played indoors, took place before a crowd of 47,876 people that included the President and Lady Bird Johnson, and the home team won, 2–1. Fans who watched batting practice during the daylight hours saw the flaw in the indoor stadium design: the transparent panels and the pattern of interconnecting girders on the dome created glare when the sun was out, and the outfielders lost track of fly balls. "The players shagging fly balls in left and center field particularly stumbled, hesitated, covered their heads in self defense or threw up both hands in despair," a UPI report noted the next day, often missing the path of the ball "by yards and yards". Daytime exhibition games on Saturday and Sunday were not affected by the glare because of cloudy skies, but the Astros' owner was prepared to cancel a game "if... it develops into a keystone comedy act with players on both sides unable to follow the flight of a ball". Before the next afternoon home game, the team solved the problem by painting over the clear panels, which would cause a different problem because the natural grass could not grow without sunlight.
- The 100th anniversary of the end of the American Civil War was observed in ceremonies near Appomattox, Virginia. Virginia Governor Albertis S. Harrison, Jr., known for resisting school integration while serving as the state attorney general, told thousands of listeners that "the belief and the principles for which the Confederate forces fought are still with us... All that was really surrendered here a century ago was the idea that these beliefs and the principles could best be served by dividing this nation in two, and that differences between Americans could really be settled by armed conflict." Speakers at the dedication of the reconstructed Appomattox Courthouse included retired Major General Ulysses S. Grant III, and Robert E. Lee IV of San Francisco.
- The day after two F-4B Phantoms had flown over the Yulin Naval Base, two groups of American planes, each with four U.S. Navy F-4Bs, flew over China's Hainan Island. This time, a squadron of four Jian-5 jet fighters from the People's Liberation Army Air Force intercepted them, with instructions not to fire unless fired upon. The American pilots stated that they had believed that they were outside China's airspace, and in an area 36 miles southwest of Hainan, while China accused the U.S. of trying to provoke a war.
- The Beatles' song "Ticket to Ride" was released as a single in the United Kingdom, and reached number one on the British chart of best-selling singles that was published five days later. It would be released in the United States on April 19, and reach number one on Billboard on May 22.
- West Germany's Bundesrat, the upper house of parliament, voted by a show of hands to approve the bill to extend the statute of limitations on prosecution of Nazi war crimes, up to January 1, 1970. The Bundestag had voted its approval on March 25.
- U.S. Navy F-4 Phantom IIs of Fighter Squadron 96 (VF-96) clashed with Chinese MiG-17 fighters over the South China Sea south of Hainan. Each side lost one fighter.
- An explosion killed 19 coal miners in a mine on Iwo Jima, and left another 11 missing.
- Born: Paulina Porizkova, Czech-born American model; in Prostějov

== April 10, 1965 (Saturday) ==
- All 54 people on board a Royal Jordanian Airlines flight were killed when the plane caught fire and crashed into a mountain in Syria near Damascus at an altitude of 4,200 feet (1,300 m). Nearly all of the passengers were from Belgium and were on a vacation tour of the Middle East, and were flying from Beirut to Amman on their way from Lebanon to Jordan. Another 12 members from the tour group had been turned away at the airport because the Herald turboprop only had room for 50 passengers.
- The Shah of Iran, Mohammad Reza Pahlavi, narrowly escaped an assassination attempt made by one of his bodyguards, Reza Shamsabadi, who fired a machine gun at him as he arrived at the Marble Palace in Tehran. The Shah was able to get inside his office and take cover behind his desk, and Shamsabadi was mortally wounded by two other guards, who died from his machine gun fire.
- The Soviet spacecraft Luna E-6 No.8, intended to be the first spacecraft to perform a soft landing on the Moon, was lost in a launch failure when a nitrogen pipeline in the oxidizer tank depressurized, causing a loss of oxidizer flow to the engine and resulting in the engine cutting off. The spacecraft failed to achieve orbit, and disintegrated on re-entry.
- World lightweight boxing champion Carlos Ortiz lost his title in a 15-round bout in Panama City to Panamanian boxer Ismael Laguna. Going into the match, Ortiz had a record of 45 wins and only four losses, but had underestimated Laguna's abilities and had elected not to train as rigorously as usual. Ortiz, a native of Puerto Rico, would regain the title seven months later in a rematch in San Juan.
- The Egyptian-appointed Governor of the Gaza Strip issued the "Liberation Tax Law", assessing a tax on all commercial revenues within the Palestinian territory. Money collected from the tax was used to fund the Palestine Liberation Organization.
- Died: Linda Darnell, 43, American film actress, died from burns in an apartment fire. Darnell had stayed up late with her secretary at her Chicago home after noting that one of her films, Star Dust, was being shown at 12:40 a.m. on The Late Late Show on Channel 2, and fell asleep afterward while smoking a cigarette.

== April 11, 1965 (Sunday) ==
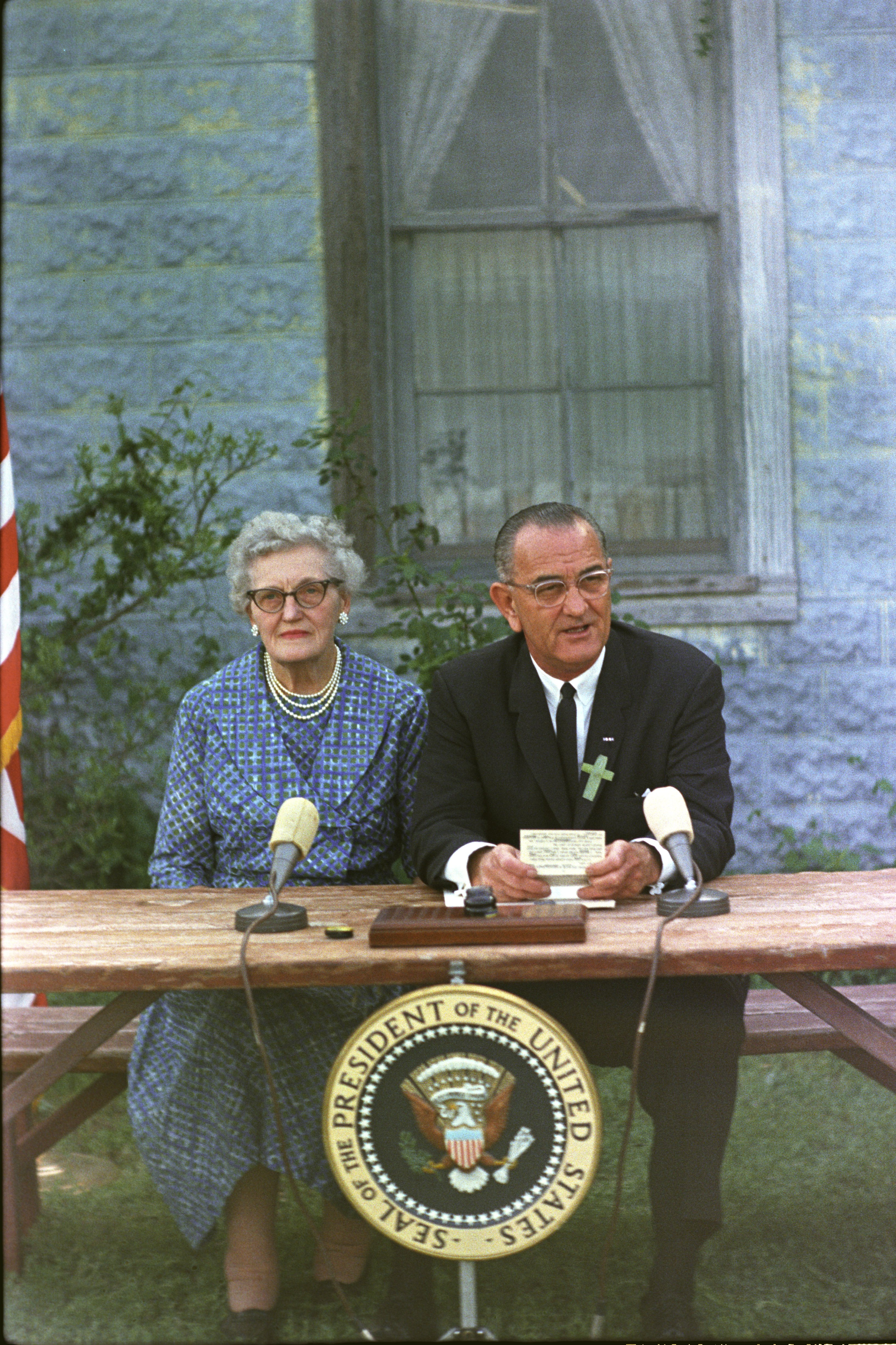
April 11, 1965: Miss Kate and her former student

- President Johnson signed the new $1.3 billion Elementary and Secondary Education Act into law in a ceremony near Stonewall, Texas, conducted in front of the school that he attended as a child. Present as an honored guest was his first schoolteacher, "Miss Kate" (by then, the 72-year-old Kate Deadrich Loney). For the first time, the federal government had power over the operation of American schools, "with the carrot of substantial federal aid now available" to schools that complied with mandates from Washington, and the reality that "the removal of federal aid could now serve as a stick to force compliance."
- At least 55 tornadoes caused destruction in the Midwestern United States, striking Iowa, Wisconsin, Illinois, Indiana, Michigan, and Ohio, killing 271 people, injuring as many as 5,000 and causing more than $250,000,000 in damages. Towns hardest hit were Pittsfield, Ohio, where all 15 homes and two buildings were destroyed, and nine of its 50 residents were killed; Russiaville, Indiana; and Alto, Indiana. The first twister was sighted at 1:30 p.m. in Dubuque, Iowa; flooding from the thunderstorms that followed caused further death and destruction in those states along the Mississippi River.
- Retired Rear Admiral William F. Raborn, Jr., was appointed as the new U.S. Director of Central Intelligence.
- The West German cargo ship Transatlantic sank in the Saint Lawrence River, near Trois Rivieres, Quebec, after colliding with the Dutch ship MV Hermes. One of her 14 crew was killed and two were reported missing.
- Soviet composer Rodion Shchedrin's Second Symphony, noted for its "modernistic score", was performed for the first time.
- Born: Eelco van Asperen, Dutch computer scientist who contributed to the original World Wide Web project; in Rotterdam (d. 2013)

== April 12, 1965 (Monday) ==
- TASS, the Soviet news agency, announced that proof of an extraterrestrial civilization had been discovered by radio astronomers at the Sternberg Astronomical Institute in Moscow, and astronomer Nikolai Kardashev was quoted as saying, "A new supercivilization has been discovered." The conclusions were based on observations by Kardashev and Iosif Shklovsky of a variable pattern of signals from the quasar CTA-102. The next day, Shklovsky held a press conference in Moscow and conceded that "to speak now about the artificial origin of the signals would be premature", and criticized TASS for "the distorted version" of his remarks and for causing "unhealthy sensationalism".

== April 13, 1965 (Tuesday) ==
- Dick Wantz, a relief pitcher, played his first (and only) major league baseball game, coming in during the 8th inning for the Los Angeles Angels during their 7–1 loss on Opening Day to the visiting Cleveland Indians. During his time on the mound, Wantz struck out two players and allowed 3 hits and 2 runs. Wantz was suffering from regular headaches; after being placed on the disabled list on May 8 in Los Angeles, he was diagnosed with a brain tumor and died on May 13, the night after surgery and exactly a month after his major league appearance.
- The U.S. House of Representatives voted 367 to 29 to approve the proposed 25th Amendment to the Constitution, dealing with procedures for filling a vacancy in the office of the Vice President, and for allowing an acting president if the President was under a disability. The U.S. Senate had approved a similar motion, 72–0. Opposing the amendment were 21 Democrats and eight Republicans. Nevada would, on February 10, 1967, become the 38th state to ratify the amendment, which would be certified on February 23.
- Lawrence Bradford, Jr., a 16-year-old high school student from New York, broke an unwritten rule that had prevailed for 176 years, becoming the first African-American to serve as a page boy in the United States Congress. Bradford was appointed by Republican U.S. Senator Jacob K. Javits of New York, with the backing of Senate Republican Leader Everett Dirksen.
- The last resident of the remote village of Colette di Usseux, located in the Piedmontese Alps of Italy, was found dead. Battista Jannin, 50, had watched all of the residents move away from the location because of its bitter winter cold, impoverished farmlands and the threat of avalanches, and had committed suicide with a gunshot.
- The government of Prime Minister Wilson survived the latest vote of no confidence in the British House of Commons, by a vote of 290 for and 316 against, a slimmer majority than the previous attempt.
- Needing to come up with a song to reflect the new title of their upcoming film, formerly called "Eight Arms To Hold You", The Beatles recorded the song "Help!".
- Born: Patricio Pouchulu, Argentine architect; in Buenos Aires

== April 14, 1965 (Wednesday) ==
- The crash of British United Airways Flight 1030X, killed 26 of the 27 people on board. After aborting its first landing attempt at Jersey Airport in the Channel Islands, the Douglas C-47B, struck the outermost pole of the approach lighting system with its right wing on its second attempt, and the aircraft rolled upside down. The lone survivor, 23-year-old flight attendant Dominique Silliere, had both legs broken.
- The United States and South Vietnam began "Operation Fact Sheet", a psychological warfare aerial mission, dropping over two million notices on those cities in North Vietnam with military facilities. The paper leaflets carried different types of messages written in the Vietnamese language. Some of them warned civilians to stay away from the areas that were to be bombed, and others suggested that civilians "could end the bombings by turning against their government", or advocated the benefits of moving to South Vietnam. During April, May, June, and March, nearly 25 million papers were dropped. "The leaflets had no effect on North Vietnamese strategy", an author would note later, "but they did result in a few civilians moving away from military facilities."
- Born: Khalid Sheikh Mohammed, al-Qaeda terrorist and organizer of the September 11 terror attacks; in Balochistan, Pakistan
- Died: Richard Hickock, 33, and Perry Smith, 36, whose murder of four members of the Clutter family would become the subject of the bestselling book In Cold Blood, were hanged at the Kansas State Penitentiary for Men in Lansing, Kansas. Hickock was hanged first, at 12:19 a.m.; at his request, the book's author Truman Capote appeared as an official witness. Smith was hanged less than 45 minutes later, at 1:02 a.m.

== April 15, 1965 (Thursday) ==
- West Germany paid Israel $75 million in cash and goods, the 13th and final installment of three billion deutschemarks ($882,000,000) in reparations for the costs associated with the relocation of 500,000 Holocaust survivors from Germany to Israel and their subsequent support by the Israeli government. Payments had commenced in 1952, and most were in the form of the fair market value of West German products and services as requested by a purchasing office in Köln. The last head of the Israeli purchasing mission, Dr. Felix Shinnar, told the press that the reparations "paid for construction of 49 Israeli merchant ships and equipment and machinery for 500 Israeli industrial enterprises".
- The first prototype of the Aérospatiale SA 330 Puma helicopter made its maiden flight.
- Production of the play The Amen Corner opened at the Ethel Barrymore Theatre in New York City.
- Born: Linda Perry, American songwriter and singer; in Springfield, Massachusetts

== April 16, 1965 (Friday) ==
- In Huntsville, Alabama, scientists made the first test of the most powerful rocket engine system ever developed, the first stage of the three-stage Saturn rocket, composed of five engines that could combine for 7.5 million pounds of thrust. "The thunderous sound of the first static test of this stage," an author would later note, "brought home to many observers that the Kennedy goal" (of sending a man to the Moon before the end of the decade) "was within technological grasp."
- Dr. Alan Frank Guttmacher, the President of Planned Parenthood, told a gathering of the American Academy of General Practice in San Francisco that if the birth rate was not decreased, the world's population would be 150 billion people by the year 2050. By 2015, the United Nations' prediction for the world's population for 2050 was 9.6 billion people.
- Born:
  - Martin Lawrence, American film and television comedian; at a U.S. military base in Frankfurt, Hesse, West Germany
  - Jon Cryer, American film and television comedian; in New York City
- Died: Sydney Chaplin, 80, English actor and half-brother and business manager for Charlie Chaplin

== April 17, 1965 (Saturday) ==
- The first major demonstration against the Vietnam War was carried out by the organization Students for a Democratic Society (SDS), a march that included between 14,000 and 25,000 protesters in Washington, D.C., with participants carrying picket signs in front of the White House. Among the slogans noted by the press was "War on Poverty, Not People". President Johnson was out of town at the time. At the same time, a counter-protest of about 100 people took place across the street, and a group of students representing the University of Wisconsin presented National Security Advisor McGeorge Bundy with a petition of support for the war, signed by 6,000 faculty and students.

== April 18, 1965 (Sunday) ==
- The Indian Army withdrew from the disputed Great Rann of Kutch area where it had clashed with the Pakistan Army, after military leaders concluded that the troops were at risk of being cut off from the rest of India if the Rann flooded during the rainy season. "Upon their withdrawal," an author would note later, "morale soared in Rawalpindi and slumped in New Delhi. It was one thing for the Indian army to be drubbed by the Chinese in the Himalayas, but quite another to receive a bloody nose from the Pakistanis."
- Supporters of the former Crown Prince Muhammad al-Badr of Yemen seized control of the region around the Sarawat Mountains in the successful Wadi Humeidat military operation in conjunction with neighboring Saudi Arabia, in a setback for the Yemen Arab Republic in the ongoing North Yemen Civil War.
- African-American contralto singer Marian Anderson gave her farewell performance, ending a fifty-city tour with a concert at Carnegie Hall.
- Born: Steven Stayner, American kidnapping victim and the younger brother of serial killer Cary Stayner; in Merced, California (died in a hit-and-run, 1989)
- Died: Guillermo González Camarena, 48, Mexican inventor who pioneered the introduction of color television to Mexico, was killed in a car accident at Puebla, while returning from inspecting a television transmitter in Las Lajas, Veracruz

== April 19, 1965 (Monday) ==
- What would become known as "Moore's Law", that computing power would double every two years, was first suggested by Gordon Moore in an article in Electronics magazine, titled "Cramming More Components onto Integrated Circuits". "The complexity for minimum component costs has increased at a rate of roughly a factor of two per year," he wrote. "Certainly over the short term this rate can be expected to continue, if not to increase. That means by 1975, the number of components per integrated circuit for minimum cost will be 65,000. I believe that such a large circuit can be built on a single wafer." Within three years, Moore would become co-founder of the transistor and microprocessor manufacturer Intel, and as transistors became smaller, the size of a transistor would decrease over 40 years from 0.5 inches (13 mm) by 0.25 inches (6.4 mm) to a size where they were "so small that millions of them could fit on the head of a pin."
- Six American pilots, none of them astronauts, completed a 34-day experiment by NASA to study the effects of a month-long confinement during a space mission. The volunteers, officers drawn from the U.S. Navy and the U.S. Marines, "ate, worked, and slept in pressure suits" while inside a cylindrical chamber that was pressurized with an atmosphere of pure oxygen rather than normal air, and ate dehydrated food. One important discovery made from the test, which took place within the Philadelphia Navy Yard, was that the floor was covered with dust from dead skin cells because the men had been unable to bathe, which would be dangerous in a weightless environment. By the time of the launch of the first space station missions, provisions would be made to allow bathing.
- New York City AM radio station WINS played its final pop music record, "Out in the Streets" by The Shangri-Las, then switched formats at 8:00 p.m., becoming an all-news radio station, setting a trend toward "talk radio" that would be picked up by other AM stations.
- The 1965 Australian One and a Half Litre Championship motor race was held at Mount Panorama Circuit and won by Bib Stillwell.
- The 1st Sunday Mirror Trophy motor race (formerly the Glover Trophy) was held at Goodwood Circuit, UK, and won by Jim Clark.
- Adolph P. Hugo's home-built Hu-Go Craft made its first flight.
- Born: Suge Knight (Marion Hugh Knight, Jr.), American rap record producer and co-founder and former CEO of Death Row Records; in Compton, California

== April 20, 1965 (Tuesday) ==
- At a meeting of American military and political leaders in Honolulu, U.S. Ambassador to South Vietnam Maxwell D. Taylor successfully proposed that the U.S. adopt what he called the "enclave strategy" in its conduct of the Vietnam War. Defense Secretary Robert S. McNamara and Assistant Secretary John McNaughton, CIA analyst William Bundy, U.S. Army General William C. Westmoreland, U.S. Navy Admiral U. S. Grant Sharp Jr., and the Joint Chiefs of Staff Chairman, General Earle G. Wheeler, concurred in the proposal, which was adopted by President Johnson. Taylor's idea was to limit U.S. ground operations to within a 50-mile (80 km) radius of important areas in important coastal areas, and to conduct counterinsurgency operations with the South Vietnamese Army in the surrounding territory. The strategy would prove unsuccessful, leading to Taylor's resignation and a switch to a "search and destroy" operation in June.
- The first legislative elections took place in the 15 Cook Islands, a semi-independent dependency of New Zealand, and were won by the Cook Islands Party (CIP), led by Albert Henry. Since Henry was ineligible for elective office because he had not resided on the islands for at least three years, his sister, Marguerite Story, would serve as the nation's acting premier until the CIP could amend the constitution.
- King Hassan II of Morocco announced reforms that included the redistribution of government-owned land to farmers, and the creation of the "Common Fund for Agrarian Reform"; some land grants would be made in 1969 and 1970, but the reforms would prove to be modest.

== April 21, 1965 (Wednesday) ==
- Habib Bourguiba, the President of Tunisia, outraged the other leaders within the Arab League after he proposed that the Arab nations should give recognition to Israel, albeit within the boundaries that had been proposed in the 1947 United Nations Partition Plan for Palestine. Borguiba's proposal was based on his position that Israel would never agree to the borders that the UN had voted on in Resolution 181, and that "If Israel refuses to apply the UN decisions, the legality of the UN will be on our side, which will strengthen our position in approaching a solution by force," but the strategy was viewed by the other Arab states as a betrayal of the Palestinian people.
- The songwriting team of Andrew Lloyd Webber and Tim Rice was created when musician Webber, attending Oxford University, received a letter from lyricist Rice, that said, "I've been told you're looking for a 'with it' writer of lyrics for your songs... I wonder if you consider it worth your while meeting me." The two would team up on numerous rock musicals, starting with the unsuccessful The Likes of Us, followed by the hits Joseph and the Amazing Technicolor Dreamcoat, Jesus Christ Superstar, and Evita.
- The 1964 New York World's Fair in Flushing Meadows, New York, reopened for its second six-month season. The fair had operated from April 22 to October 19, 1964, then closed for six months, before reopening for 1965. It would close permanently on October 17, 1965.
- The second round of municipal elections was held in France. The Communist party made gains, and began co-operating with other parties of the parliamentary left.
- Parliamentary elections were held within those parts of Sudan that were not disrupted by the civil war in Southern Sudan.
- Born: Fiona Kelleghan, American academic and critic specializing in science fiction and fantasy; in West Palm Beach, Florida
- Died:
  - Paul Jung, 64, billed as "The King of Clown Alley" by the Ringling Brothers and Barnum & Bailey Circus, was found beaten to death in Room 1211 at the Hotel Forrest in New York City, near the circus venue at Madison Square Garden. On June 5, police would arrest a man and woman and charge them with robbery and murder. Marian De Barry would later testify against her boyfriend, Allen Jones, in return for reduced charges. Jones would be convicted of first-degree murder and sentenced to life imprisonment.
  - Sir Edward Victor Appleton, 72, English physicist and 1947 Nobel Prize laureate known for his work proving the existence of Earth's ionosphere
  - Pedro Albizu Campos, 73, advocate for Puerto Rican independence from the United States

== April 22, 1965 (Thursday) ==
- U.S. Defense Secretary Robert S. McNamara told reporters that he would not rule out the use of nuclear weapons in the Vietnam War, during a press conference given under the condition that the reporters not attribute his remarks to him, nor quote him verbatim. Tom Wicker of The New York Times took notes and paraphrased the statement, in which McNamara said, "We are not following a strategy that recognizes any sanctuary or any weapons restriction. But we would use nuclear weapons only after fully applying non-nuclear arsenal. In other words, if 100 planes couldn't take out a target... we would try 200 planes, and so on. But 'inhibitions' on using nuclear weapons are not overwhelming." Wicker's report in the Sunday Times noted that "High officials" in the Johnson administration "emphasize that it is 'inconceivable' that nuclear weapons would be used in the present circumstances of the war. They do not rule out the possibility that circumstances might arise in which nuclear weapons have to be used." Nikolai T. Fedorenko, the Soviet Ambassador to the United Nations, sharply criticized McNamara and the U.S. in a speech the day after the report, commenting, "See the statement made today by Mr. McNamara... The United States is not averse to utilizing — this time perhaps as tactical weapons— nuclear warheads against the people of an Asian country as they have done once before, covering themselves with indelible shame for centuries to come. Mr. McNamara clearly reserved the right to unleash nuclear war in Viet Nam."
- NASA's "Abort Panel" met to review abort criteria for Gemini 4, and decided that rules followed by Gemini 3 would suffice.
- The Transavia PL-12 Airtruk, a new Australian aircraft, made its maiden flight.

== April 23, 1965 (Friday) ==
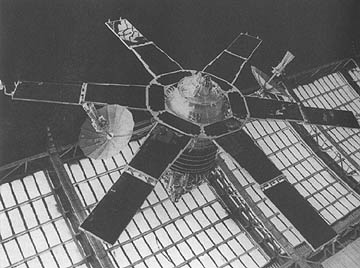
Molniya 1

- The Soviet Union launched its first communications satellite, Molniya 1, which relayed the signal to show "a documentary film of the life of Pacific fishermen", for about three hours. The Moscow reporter for The New York Times noted the next day that the telecast began at 9:00 in the morning Moscow time (4:00 in the afternoon in Vladivostok) and that, since television programming was normally not shown until the afternoon, "virtually no home television viewer" in Moscow had a set turned on to see the first broadcast. The satellite was put into an elliptical polar orbit, reaching its apogee of 24,000 miles (39,000 km) above Earth twice a day, over Soviet territory and over North America; 16 more of the Molniya series would be launched into polar orbit over the next six years, until the implementation of the Molniya II series in 1971.
- Lockheed delivered its first C-141A Starlifter cargo aircraft after nearly two years of testing and certification. The first of the massive cargo planes was deployed at Travis Air Force Base in California for the 44th Air Transport Squadron of the U.S. Air Force Military Airlift Command.
- Born: Leni Robredo, Vice President of the Philippines from 2016 to 2022; in Naga, Camarines Sur
- Died: George Adamski, 74, bestselling American author of Flying Saucers Have Landed and Flying Saucers Farewell

== April 24, 1965 (Saturday) ==
- The Dominican Civil War began when Colonel Francisco Caamaño Deñó and Manuel Ramon Montes Arache led more than 1,000 supporters of deposed Dominican Republic President Juan Bosch, in a mutiny against the right-wing junta led by Donald Reid Cabral. General Marco Rivera Cuesta, the Army Chief of Staff and Caamano's commander, was seized by the rebels, along with key military installations. Jose Franco Pena Gomez, the civilian leader of the Dominican Revolutionary Party (the PRD) called for a popular uprising, and thousands of people surged into the streets of Santo Domingo. General Elias Wessin y Wessin would say later that he had warned President Reid for three weeks of a conspiracy within the Dominican Army "but he did not pay any attention to me". Although he was aware that a coup was imminent, the U.S. Ambassador, William Tapley Bennett, Jr., had left the country the day before, and "other members of the embassy were either off on assignment or vacation".
- A group of 100,000 Armenians gathered in the Armenian SSR capital of Erevan, after the Soviet government had given a permit for official commemoration of the 50th anniversary of the 1915 Armenian genocide. What started as a peaceful gathering in the Armenian capital's Lenin Square quickly turned into a protest for recovery of Armenian lands from neighboring Turkey, and independence from the Soviet Union, giving the team of Leonid Brezhnev and Alexei Kosygin their first test of managing the various nationalities. When the protests threatened to become a riot, the city's firemen were ordered to break out fire hoses and drive the demonstrators away, and militia volunteers then moved in to clear the streets, but the Soviet Army was ordered by Moscow not to intervene.
- Two children were killed, and three others seriously injured, at a shopping center in Taylor, Michigan when a carnival ride collapsed and threw them to the ground. Sharon Hawks and her brother Grant Hawks had been among the kids who climbed aboard the "Flying Comet", a spinning ride using centrifugal force to rotate ride vehicles at a height of 10 feet (3.0 m) above the ground.
- The Pennine Way, a 267-mile (430 km) long walking trail along the Pennine hills, was officially opened, as the first National Trail in the United Kingdom. Tom Stephenson, a reporter for the Daily Herald, had suggested the walkway in 1935 after being inspired by the Appalachian Trail in the United States, and was present for the dedication.
- The bodies of Portuguese opposition politician Humberto Delgado and his secretary Arajaryr Moreira de Campos were found in a forest near Villanueva del Fresno, Spain. Both had been kidnapped and killed on February 12.
- President Sukarno announced the nationalization of all foreign companies in Indonesia.
- Died: Owney Madden, 73, British-born American mobster, boxing promoter, and operator of the Cotton Club nightclub in Harlem

== April 25, 1965 (Sunday) ==
- Dominican Republic President Cabral and the other two members of his junta resigned after they were arrested at the National Palace by the Constitutionalists, who set up a provisional government headed by Dr. José Rafael Molina Ureña, pending the return of Juan Bosch from exile in Puerto Rico.

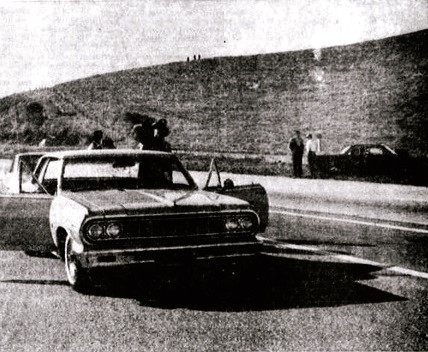
Police attempting to stop the sniper who shot 14 random people on Highway 101

- Sixteen-year-old Michael Andrew Clark killed three people and wounded 11 others by shooting at cars from a hilltop along Highway 101 just south of Orcutt, California. Clark killed himself as police rushed the hilltop.
- The Boston Celtics beat the Los Angeles Lakers, 129 to 96, to win Game 5 of the 1965 NBA Finals and clinched their seventh National Basketball Association championship.
- A week after the defeat of the YAR army by royalist forces, Ahmad Muhammad Numan replaced Hassan al-Amri as Prime Minister of the Yemen Arab Republic.
- The 1965 World Table Tennis Championships concluded at Hala Tivoli, Ljubljana, SR Slovenia, SFR Yugoslavia.
- Born: John Paul Henson, American puppeteer and son of Muppets creator Jim Henson; in Saugerties, New York (d. 2014)

== April 26, 1965 (Monday) ==
- Manchester United clinched England's soccer football championship, breaking a standings tie with Leeds United with a better goal difference. Leeds United had a record of 26–8–7 (60 points) going into its final game, while Manchester United was at 25–9–6 (59 points) with two games left. Leeds was held to a 3–3 tie in a must-win game with Birmingham, however, while Manchester beat Arsenal, 3–1, giving both teams 26 wins and nine ties and 61 points. However, Manchester had 51 more goals in its favor than against it (88 vs. 37) while the goal difference for Leeds was only 31 (83 vs. 52), eliminating it from the title.
- Thousands of anti-war protesters attacked the U.S. embassies in Cambodia and Japan.
- The first complete performance of American composer Charles Ives' Symphony No. 4, conducted by Leopold Stokowski with the American Symphony Orchestra at Carnegie Hall in New York City, was presented 11 years after the composer's death and around 40 years since he last worked on it.
- The Brazilian television station Rede Globo began broadcasting.

Logo of Rede Globo (1965-1966)

- Born: Kevin James (stage name for Kevin George Knipfing), American comedian best known as the star of the television comedy The King of Queens and in film for Paul Blart: Mall Cop; in Mineola, New York

== April 27, 1965 (Tuesday) ==
- The Ryan XV-5 Vertifan, a prototype vertical take-off jet aircraft, crashed on its test flight in front of 500 U.S. Army and U.S. Marine Corps generals and U.S. Navy admirals, accompanied by members of the press. Test pilot Lou Everett lifted the jet from Edwards Air Force Base, and was returning for a landing when the plane failed while switching from normal horizontal flight to a straight descent. At an altitude of 800 feet (240 m), Everett was on the fifth of eight steps in the conversion process when he radioed "I've got to get out!" As the observers watched from 2 miles (3.2 km) away, the Vertifan jet plunged to the ground and exploded. Everett was able to eject while less than 300 feet (91 m) from the ground, but his parachute failed to open and he was killed on impact.
- The Indonesia–Malaysia Confrontation began on the island of Borneo, where Malaysia and Indonesia had territory, as the Indonesian Army crossed the border into the Malaysian state of Sarawak and attacked the British Army Parachute Regiment, based at the border village of Plaman Mapu. Company Sergeant Major John Williams of the 2nd Battalion would win the DCM for gallantry for his role in what was known as the Battle of Plaman Mapu. Williams, who would later be a Lieutenant-Colonel, lost an eye in the battle and gained the nickname "Patch".
- After three days, a coup attempt to restore Juan Bosch as President of the Dominican Republic was thwarted by a counterattack by military forces loyal to President Donald Reid Cabral. President Molina was forced from office only two days after he had been installed by the pro-Bosch rebels, and was replaced by Colonel Pedro Bartolome Benoit of the Dominican Air Force.
- By voice vote, the United States Senate voted to approve an emergency appropriation of $2.2 billion to bail out government agencies that had already exhausted $17.5 billion allotted to them. What made the vote unusual was that by the time that the "brief and apathetic debate" ended, only seven of the 100 U.S. Senators remained present to vote.
- Born: Anna Chancellor, English actress; in Richmond, London
- Died: Edward R. Murrow, 57, pioneering American broadcast journalist, and later the director of the United States Information Agency, died from lung cancer

== April 28, 1965 (Wednesday) ==
- The U.S. began a military occupation of the Dominican Republic. Forces loyal to the deposed military-imposed government staged a countercoup, supported by U.S. troops sent by President Lyndon B. Johnson, ostensibly to protect U.S. citizens, but primarily to prevent "another Cuba", the Communist takeover of a second nation in Latin America. The 6th U.S. Marine Expeditionary Unit, with 400 Marines under the command of Colonel G.W.E. Daughtry, came ashore from the USS Boxer, and began a mission to evacuate 1,300 American citizens who were caught in the area where fighting was taking place. José Rafael Molina Ureña, installed by the military as the nation's Acting President, was removed from his post, and would be replaced three days later by Pedro Bartolomé Benoit. Helicopters brought 150 U.S. nationals to the Boxer, while two U.S. Navy transports evacuated 640 people, most of them Americans. Eventually, there would be 23,000 U.S. troops in place, the last of whom would be removed in 1966; the event marked an end to the "Good Neighbor policy" that had been in place between the United States and Latin America after more than 30 years without an American invasion of a Western Hemisphere nation.
- Lindsey Nelson, the radio broadcaster for the New York Mets, became the first and only person to call a baseball game from directly over the field, and the only person to broadcast from the ceiling of a domed stadium. At the Houston Astrodome for the Mets' game against the Astros, Nelson agreed to be hoisted in a gondola to a point 208 feet (63 m) above second base, and was afraid to stand up until the 7th inning, after initially getting game reports by walkie-talkie from his producer. When Nelson did stand up, he realized that it was impossible to tell the players apart and that "You couldn't tell a line drive from a pop fly." The Mets lost, 12–9, and Nelson declined to repeat the stunt.
- In a meeting with his military advisers in the People's Republic of China, Chairman Mao Zedong ordered the Central Military Commission to prepare for a landing of U.S. (or U.S.-sponsored) paratroopers within the Guangxi and Yunnan Provinces that bordered North Vietnam, warning that "In all interior regions, we should build caves in mountains. If no mountain is around, hills should be created to construct defense works. We should be on guard against enemy paratroops deep inside our country and prevent the enemy from marching unstopped into China."
- President Johnson met with FBI Director J. Edgar Hoover and noted that, according to U.S. intelligence reports, American protests against the Vietnam War were part of a strategy of China, North Vietnam, and the American members of the "New Left"; with the goal that "intensified antiwar agitation in the United States would eventually create a traumatic domestic crisis leading to a complete breakdown in law and order" and that "U.S. troops would have to be withdrawn from Vietnam in order to restore domestic tranquility."
- The U.S. House of Representatives voted unanimously (358–0) to approve its version of the Clean Water Act, which was different from the U.S. Senate version that had passed 68–8.
- William Raborn succeeded John A. McCone as director of the Central Intelligence Agency after being confirmed by voice vote in the U.S. Senate.

== April 29, 1965 (Thursday) ==
- Shortly after 8:00 p.m., Australia's Prime Minister Robert Menzies confirmed to Parliament in Canberra that he was sending the 1st Battalion of the Royal Australian Regiment to fight in the Vietnam War, supposedly at the request of the Premier of South Vietnam. Journalists had broken the news the day before. Prime Minister Menzies had decided to substantially increase its number of troops in South Vietnam, supposedly at the request of the Saigon government. It would later be revealed that Menzies had, at the behest of the U.S., asked the South Vietnamese to formally make the request. The day before, after the news of the Menzies government's plans had been published to the press, Menzies cabled the Australian Embassy in Saigon to stress the urgent need for South Vietnam to actually send a request, and during Thursday, Ambassador H. D. Anderson and his staff had to speak to the Vietnamese Premier, Phan Huy Quát, to ask him to invite Australia to enter the war. The cablegram from Premier Quát was not received by Menzies until 5:36 p.m., two and a half hours before Menzies was scheduled to speak to Parliament.
- A 6.7 magnitude earthquake killed seven people in the northwestern U.S. and caused about US$12.5 million in damage in the area around Olympia, Washington. The quake struck at 8:29 a.m. and of the seven fatalities, four were women who died of heart attacks, and three were men who were killed by falling debris.

== April 30, 1965 (Friday) ==
- At 2:16 in the morning local time, the 3rd Brigade of the U.S. Army's 82nd Airborne Division invaded the Dominican Republic to intervene in the ongoing Dominican Civil War. The group, first of 1,700 troops, landed at the San Isidro Air Base about 15 miles (24 km) east of the capital, Santo Domingo, on orders of U.S. President Johnson on the pretext of protecting American citizens from a rebellion against the Dominican government.
- Clifford R. Benware, Jr. of Malone, New York, a 19-year-old private first class in the United States Marines, became the first U.S. serviceman to die in combat during the invasion of the Dominican Republic, after moving out from the Ambassador Hotel in Santo Domingo into the surrounding streets. By coincidence, the tiny New York village of less than 12,000 turned out to be the home of the sister-in-law of Francisco Caamaño, the rebel leader, and the home of one of the American families waiting to be evacuated by the U.S. Marines.
- Robert C. Ruark published his last newspaper column, after having penned almost 4,000 separate installments over 20 years, distributed by the United Feature Syndicate to American newspapers. Ruark, whose column was usually referred to only by his name, was dying of cirrhosis of the liver. He died two months later, on July 1, two months after his farewell column. "Quite frankly," he wrote, "after 30 years in the newspaper business, I suddenly realize that I am nearly 50 and am weary of deadlines... My feet hurt. My fingers hurt. My brain is still sharp, I trust. But I am less and less willing to punish it on a daily schedule... Until the next dispatch floats back in a bottle, my deepest thanks to you all for being so kind and tolerant of a typewriter which seems determined not to write this last, sad piece."
- The FBI discontinued the wiretapping of Martin Luther King Jr.'s home telephone after almost a year and a half of eavesdropping on his conversations. Listening devices had been installed on November 8, 1963, and remained until he moved to a new home in Atlanta.
- I. W. Abel was declared winner of the contentious United Steelworkers of America election that had concluded on February 9. The final count showed 308,910 votes for Abel, and 298,768 for incumbent David J. McDonald, whose term would expire on June 1.
- Born: Adrian Pasdar, Iranian-American TV actor and film director; in Pittsfield, Massachusetts
