= March 1965 =

Month of 1965

<<	March 1965					>>
Su	Mo	Tu	We	Th	Fr	Sa
	1	2	3	4	5	6
7	8	9	10	11	12	13
14	15	16	17	18	19	20
21	22	23	24	25	26	27
28	29	30	31

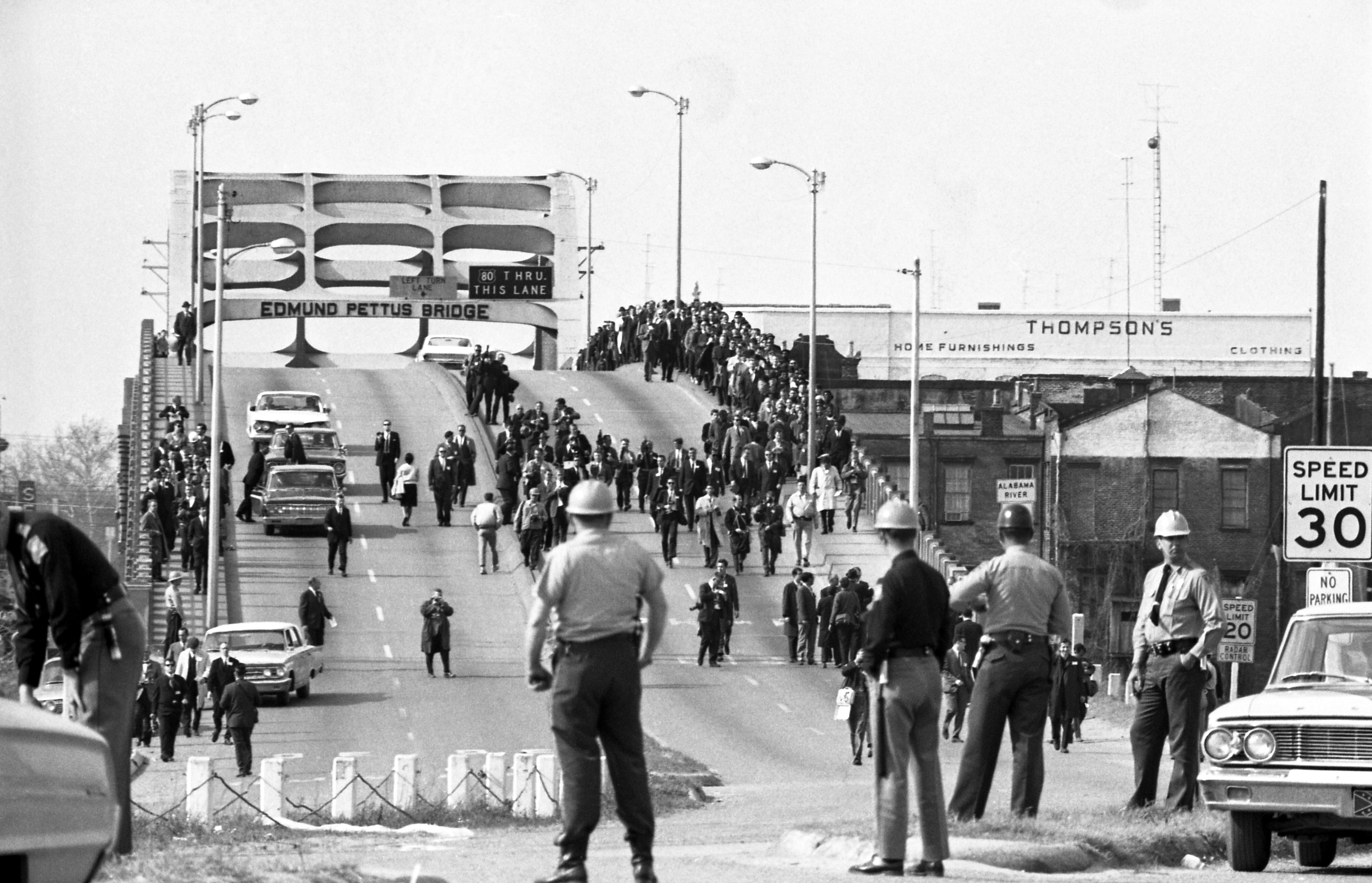
March 7, 1965: A civil rights movement attempt to march from Selma to Montgomery to discuss voting rights begins

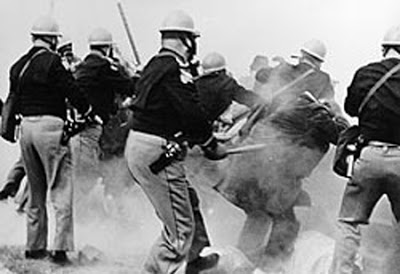
March 7, 1965: Civil rights marchers are beaten by police while trying to march from Selma to Montgomery

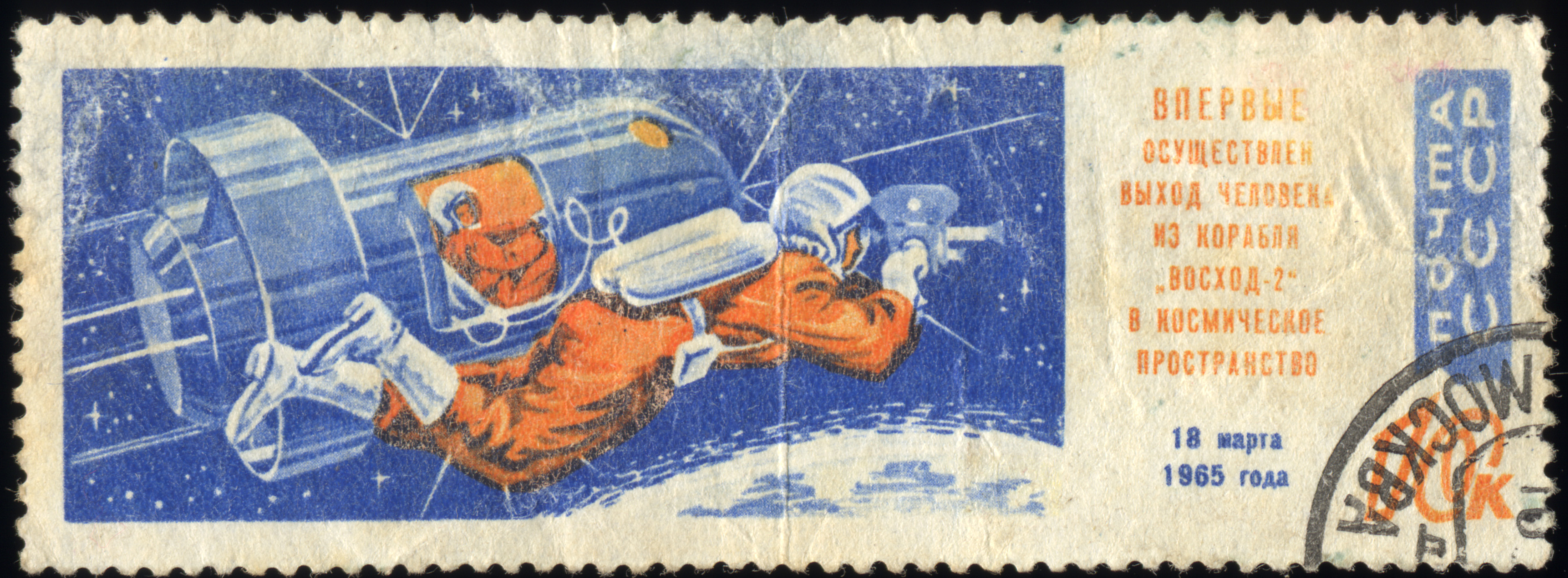
March 18, 1965: Alexei Leonov becomes the first person to "walk in space"

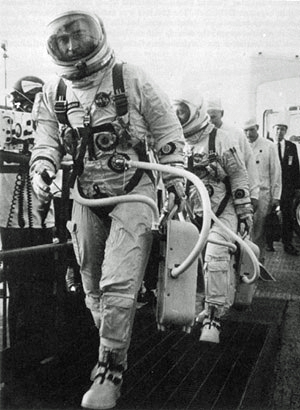
March 23, 1965: John Young and Gus Grissom before being launched on the first two-astronaut mission

The following events occurred in March 1965:

== March 1, 1965 (Monday) ==
- The first general election in the Bechuanaland Protectorate to feature universal suffrage took place throughout the former British colony and African protectorate. The Bechuanaland Democratic Party won 28 of the 31 seats in the new parliament, and the BDP leader, Sir Seretse Khama, became the first prime minister. Bechuanaland would be granted independence from the United Kingdom in 1966 as Botswana. Khama, who had been destined to become the Chief Khama IV of the Bamangwato tribe, had been ostracized for his interracial marriage to a white British woman, Ruth Williams, and exiled from his homeland until 1956, then returned to even greater popularity.
- The United States Supreme Court rendered its opinion in Freedman v. Maryland, unanimously striking down a Maryland censorship law that had given the state censor the authority to ban the showing of a film and putting the burden on the film exhibitor to file a lawsuit in order to appeal. Under the new rule, it would become the burden of the censor to prove that a film content was not protected by the U.S. Constitution, and the censor would now have the burden of filing for an injunction against the showing of a film. The guidelines of the ruling would apply to all state censorship laws.
- Olympic swimming champion and 1964 Australian of the Year Dawn Fraser was banned from competition for ten years by the Australian Amateur Swimming Union, in apparent disapproval of her partying lifestyle and for her behavior during the 1964 Summer Olympics.
- At 8:12 a.m., A natural gas explosion killed 28 people at the La Salle Heights Apartments in La Salle, Quebec . Eighteen of the apartment units in the three-story building at Bergevin and Jean Milot Streets were destroyed, and most of the dead were children.
- Bruce McLaren won the 100-mile (160 km) 1965 Australian Grand Prix, held at the Longford Circuit at Launceston, Tasmania, but the race was marred by a crash that killed driver Rocky Tresise and a cameraman, Robin Babera.
- The U.S. made its first underground silo launch of the new Minuteman intercontinental ballistic missile. The test took place at Ellsworth Air Force Base near Rapid City, South Dakota.
- East African members of the British Commonwealth began negotiations with the "Common Market" (European Economic Community).
- NASA's Office of Manned Space Flight began two days of Project Gemini design certification review. Gemini 3 was ready for launch as soon as the planned test and checkout procedures at Cape Kennedy were completed.
- Born:
  - Booker T, American professional wrestling champion and promoter; as Robert Brooker Tio Huffman in Plain Dealing, Bossier, Louisiana
  - Mike Dean, American record producer, audio engineer and multi-instrumentalist; in Houston
  - Stewart Elliott, Canadian-born American thoroughbred racing jockey; in Toronto

== March 2, 1965 (Tuesday) ==
- Canadian drug lord and mobster Lucien Rivard escaped from the Bourdeaux Jail in Montreal, where he had been held for ten months while fighting extradition to the United States to face charges of drug trafficking. At about 6:20 p.m., Rivard and a fellow inmate, Andre Durocher, asked one of the guards for permission to get a hose "so they could flood the jail's hockey rink". After a guard escorted them to the storage room, Durocher pointed a gun (which was actually a carved piece of wood covered with black shoe polish) at the guard, tied him and two maintenance workers up with wire, overpowered another guard and took his shotgun, scaled the 20-foot (6.1 m) high wall around the jail with a ladder, used the hose to slide to the ground, hijacked a car that was stopped at a traffic light, and made their escape. The incident would lead to a scandal in which the members of the cabinet of Prime Minister Lester Pearson were accused of complicity in the escape, and which would ultimately lead to the resignation of Canada's Minister of Justice, Guy Favreau. Rivard would be recaptured on July 16 at a cottage 15 miles (24 km) southwest of the jail.
- Operation Rolling Thunder, the daily bombing of North Vietnam by the United States, began as the 8th and the 13th Bomber Squadrons set off from the Biên Hòa Airfield with eight B-57 Canberra bombers and the protection of F-100 Super Sabres. The first raid was on an ammunition dump at Xom Bong, in North Vietnamese territory 35 miles (56 km) north of the Demilitarized Zone (DMZ), and did serious damage, but at the cost of three F-105 and two F-100 fighters, and the capture of the one surviving pilot of the five. A historian would later note, "America was shocked that its large, high-tech, expensive air force, in combat for the first time since the Korean War, had been humbled by a third world country, a communist one at that." The operation would have 700,000 sorties until its halt on October 31, 1968, without bringing any visible end to the Vietnam War. "Rolling Thunder's ultimate failure came as a result of an inappropriate strategy that dictated a conventional air war against North Vietnam to affect what was basically an unconventional war in South Vietnam."

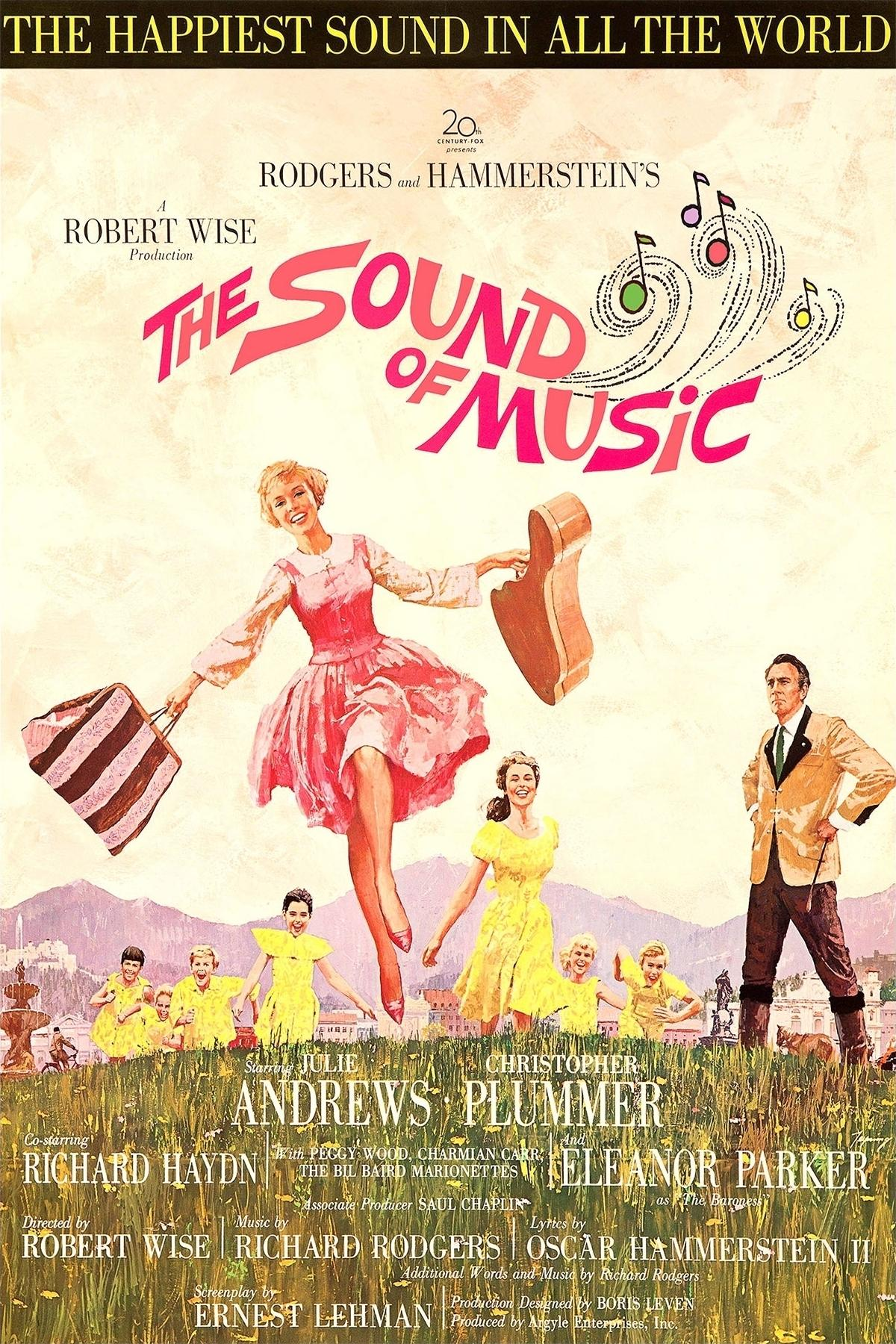
The most popular film of 1965

- The Sound of Music, starring Julie Andrews and Christopher Plummer in 20th Century Fox's film adaptation of the Rodgers & Hammerstein musical, premiered at the Rivoli Theater in New York City. It would be released in Los Angeles on March 10, and elsewhere in the U.S. on the Wednesdays that followed. "Sneak" previews had also been held on January 15 at the Mann Theatre in Minneapolis, Minnesota, and in Tulsa, Oklahoma the next day.
- In the U.S. city of Philadelphia, four men were driving past the Fidelity Philadelphia Trust Company bank when they spotted a bag that had been accidentally dropped by a Brink's armored car, and picked up what turned out to be $40,000 in cash (worth more than $300,000 fifty years later). They were arrested four days later after one of the group used some of his newfound wealth to buy a 1963 Cadillac automobile.
- An avalanche in the Austrian Alps killed 14 college students from Sweden. The students were passengers on a bus that was taking them to the ski resort at Obertauern, and were on the Radstadt Tauern road. They died after falling rocks swept the vehicle down into a valley 150 feet (46 m) below.
- The U.S. space program suffered a setback when a $12,000,000 Atlas-Centaur rocket exploded during an attempted uncrewed launch. The rocket "rose about three feet from its pad, lost power from two of its three engines, crashed back to the ground and erupted into a brilliant orange ball of fire".

== March 3, 1965 (Wednesday) ==
- Wilbur Mills, the Chairman of the House Ways and Means Committee, "pulled a 'legislative coup' that would forever change the nation's health care system" with the surprise recommendation that all three of the alternative proposals for health care should be combined. The result would be that the Social Security Amendments of 1965 would have the Democrats' King-Anderson Bill as "Medicare Part A", the Republicans' "Bettercare" bill would become "Medicare Part B", and the "Eldercare" bill would become Medicaid.
- Congress voted to repeal a requirement that one-fourth of bank deposit liabilities of the Federal Reserve System had to be matched by an equivalent amount of gold. The rule had been in effect for 52 years since the passage of the original Federal Reserve Act in 1913. President Johnson signed the bill into the law the next day. The requirement of gold backing for one-fourth of bank notes on deposit in the 12 Federal Reserve System would continue until March 18, 1968.
- The U.S. House of Representatives voted 257–165 to approve the Appalachian Regional Development Act, the first of the War on Poverty bills, a month after the U.S. Senate had given 62–22 approval. President Lyndon Johnson would sign the one-billion-dollar measure, which provided $1,092,200,000 toward highway construction and other projects, on March 9.
- The bombing raids by the United States against North Vietnam were not a "war", according to a U.S. State Department release. The bombing "does not bring about the existence of a state of war, which is a legal characterization rather than an actual description," a spokesman wrote. Instead, there was "armed aggression from the north against the Republic of Viet Nam" and "Pursuant to South Viet Nam's request and consultations between our two governments, the Republic of Viet Nam and the United States are engaged in collective defense against that armed aggression."
- Lincoln City, Oregon was created by the merger of five towns (Cutler City, Delake, Nelscott, Oceanlake and Taft). The name, suggested by a group of schoolchildren, was selected in a contest.
- Born: Dragan Stojković, Serbian footballer and football manager; in Niš, Yugoslavia
- Died: Renato Biasutti, 76, Italian geographer and physical anthropologist who wrote The Races and People of the World, classifying homo sapiens into "five subspecies, sixteen primary races, and fifty-two secondary races".

== March 4, 1965 (Thursday) ==
- At 6:04 a.m., 17 people were killed by the explosion of a natural gas pipeline that destroyed a neighborhood in Natchitoches, Louisiana. The blast left a 15-foot (4.6 m) deep crater where seven homes had stood. The disaster was later traced to high pressure that had ruptured the pipe. An area of 13.8 acres (5.6 ha) of land was incinerated, and pieces of metal weighing hundreds of pounds were hurled as far as 351 feet (107 m) by the explosion.
- An angry mob assembled at the U.S. Embassy in Moscow to protest the bombing of North Vietnam, before finally being driven away by police on horseback and soldiers. The next day, the Soviet Union formally apologized to the U.S. government and began replacement of 310 broken windows in the ten-story high embassy building, and the removal of stains from more than 200 inkpots that had been shattered against the walls.
- The government of British Prime Minister Harold Wilson survived a censure motion in the House of Commons by a margin of only five votes, with 293 in favor of the condemnation of his national defense policy, and 298 against.
- The U.S. formally requested New Zealand to participate in the Vietnam War. Prime Minister Keith Holyoake did not respond initially, and a second request would be sent eight days later.
- Born: Khaled Hosseini, Afghan novelist, UNHCR Ambassador, and former physician; in Kabul (official birth date)
- Died: Willard Motley, 55, African-American novelist and author of Knock on Any Door, later adapted for film, died of a gangrene infection contracted while living in Mexico City.

== March 5, 1965 (Friday) ==
- After stripping Muhammad Ali of his World Boxing Association heavyweight title, the WBA staged a bout in Chicago for a new "world champion" to replace Ali. Ernie Terrell defeated Eddie Machen in a unanimous decision by the fight judges. "To the man in the street, Ali may have been a Black Muslim... he may have come across as a brash young pain-in-the-ass. He may have been all these of these things," an author would later note, "but until he lost, retired or died, he was the champion. Consequently, when Terrell outpointed Machen, few cared."
- The Bahrain Petroleum Company (BAPCO) announced that it was laying off hundreds of Bahraini workers, an event that triggered what is now referred to as the March Intifada. On March 9, the rest of the Bahraini employees of BAPCO went out on strike, and were joined by student protesters who soon took out their frustrations on cars owned by Europeans in the British protectorate on the Arabian peninsula.
- The Kilauea volcano in Hawaii erupted at 9:43 a.m., through a series of fissures that extended for nearly eight miles from the Makaaopuhi Crater to the Napau Crater. Within the first eight hours, 15 million cubic meters of lava would pour out of the ground.
- Edward R. Murrow, director of the United States Information Agency, was named an Honorary Knight Commander of the Most Excellent Order of the British Empire by Queen Elizabeth II, less than two months before his death.
- ONGC Videsh Limited, India's entry into the field of international oil exploration, was incorporated as Hydrocarbons India Ltd. Within 50 years, it would be participating in 39 projects in 15 nations.
- Guitarist Jeff Beck performed his first major concert, after being hired by The Yardbirds to replace Eric Clapton. Beck's introduction came at Fairfield Halls in Croydon.
- Died:
  - Chen Cheng, 68, Chinese political and military leader
  - Helen Waddell, 75, Irish poet and playwright

== March 6, 1965 (Saturday) ==
- Tunisia's President Habib Bourguiba broke with the leaders of the rest of the Arab nations in North Africa and the Middle East, and called for the recognition of Israel, within the borders that had been set by the United Nations, in 1947, for separate Jewish and Arab states, though "all it earned him was a violent campaign of hate and vilification".
- Fayzulla Khodzhayev, who had served as the leader of the Uzbek Soviet Socialist Republic until his arrest in 1937 on orders of Soviet premier Joseph Stalin, was rehabilitated posthumously by the Soviet government, almost 27 years after he had been among the people executed after the "Trial of the Trotskyite and Rightist Bloc of 21".
- Indonesia hosted the first Africa-Asia Islamic Conference (KIAA, Konferensi Islam Afrika-Asia), with 107 delegates from 33 nations traveling to Bandung.
- Chinese students protested at the Soviet Embassy in Beijing, criticizing the USSR's use of force in breaking up the March 4 demonstration in Moscow.
- Red Army General Nikolai F. Vatutin, leader of the Ukrainian Front, was declared a Hero of the Soviet Union, 21 years after his death.
- Died:
  - Herbert Morrison, 77, former Deputy Prime Minister of the United Kingdom (1945–51)
  - Margaret Dumont, 82, American film actress best known as the foil for Groucho Marx

== March 7, 1965 (Sunday) ==
- A march of 550 civil rights demonstrators was broken up violently by 200 members of the Alabama Highway Patrol, as the protesters began their march from Selma, Alabama, to the state capital at Montgomery. In response to the killing of Jimmie Lee Jackson, Hosea Williams and John Lewis started from the Brown Chapel AME Church and proceeded over the Edmund Pettus Bridge on U.S. Route 80 with a petition for Alabama Governor George C. Wallace. Reverend Frederick D. Reese would recall later that the officer in charge of the troopers told them, "I have orders from the Governor. You cannot march down Highway 80. This is for your protection." When the marchers began kneeling in prayer rather than turning back, "the troopers came forward and began beating the people with billy clubs" then dispersed the crowd with tear gas. When the marchers moved back across the bridge into Dallas County, members of the county sheriff's department began beating the group again. The event would be commemorated in the American civil rights movement as "Bloody Sunday".
- Changes to the Liturgy of the Roman Catholic Mass took place throughout the world, with large parts of the Mass being said in local languages (the vernacular) for the first time, rather than in Latin, as the papal instruction Inter oecumenici became effective on the first Sunday of Lent following the 1964 reform. In Rome, Pope Paul VI conducted services in Italian at the small All Saints Church as part of a plan to substitute for the parish priest in five suburban Rome churches during the Lent season.
- Died: Queen Louise, 75, consort of Sweden and wife of King Gustaf VI Adolf. Born Louise Mountbatten and a great-granddaughter of Britain's Queen Victoria, Louise was beloved by her subjects as "vår drottning" ("our queen") "because she shopped in Stockholm's stores and markets just like any housewife".

== March 8, 1965 (Monday) ==
- At 9:02 a.m. local time, the first American military combat troops arrived in South Vietnam as 1,400 members of the United States Marines in combat gear came ashore at Da Nang Bay. The men of the 9th Marine Expeditionary Brigade were the first of 3,500 troops from the 3rd Marine Regiment of the 3rd Marine Division. The amphibious force ships Mount McKinley, Vancouver, Henrico, and Union delivered two battalions, relocated from Okinawa to guard the American air base at Da Nang. Although there were 23,000 American military personnel in South Vietnam already, the deployment represented "the first body of Americans to go to the embattled southeast Asian nation as a fighting military unit."
- The U.S. Supreme Court invalidated, in Louisiana v. United States, the "interpretation test" clause of the Louisiana state constitution, which provided that a voter had to interpret a random section of either the state or federal constitution "to the satisfaction of the registrar". As Justice Hugo Black noted in the unanimous opinion, less than one percent of African-Americans were registered to vote between 1921 and 1944, and the only 15% were registered at the time the suit was filed. "This is not a test, but a trap," Black wrote, "sufficient to stop even the most brilliant man on his way to the voting booth... The cherished right of people in a country like ours to vote cannot be obliterated by... the passing whim or impulse of a voting registrar."
- On the same day, the U.S. Supreme Court's ruling in United States v. Seeger expanded the allowable grounds for conscientious objection to being drafted.
- Emile Zuckerkandl and Linus Pauling published their groundbreaking paper, "Molecules as Documents of Evolutionary History", in the Journal of Theoretical Biology, applying their 1962 theory of the "molecular clock" to a proof "that genes can be used to determine when different organisms evolutionarily diverge", by comparing molecules of different species to estimate when divergence took place.
- The crash of Aeroflot Flight 513 killed 30 people, including the entire nine-member crew, and left only nine survivors. The Tupolev Tu-124 jet took off from Kuybyshev (now Samara) on a flight toward Rostov and then dropped from an altitude of about 150 feet (46 m).
- Born: Claudia Webbe, British Labour Party politician; in Leicester

== March 9, 1965 (Tuesday) ==
- In their second attempt to march from Selma to Montgomery, Alabama, under the leadership of Martin Luther King Jr., civil rights activists were stopped by state police at the bridge that had been the scene of violence two days earlier. Obeying a court restraining order, the group halted, and King asked State Police Major John Cloud (who said "This march is not conducive to the safety of those using the highways") whether he objected to a prayer being led by religious leaders who were present. "You can have your prayer, and then return to the church," Cloud said. After being led in prayer by Ralph Abernathy, King led the group back and vowed to march again. Later in the day, white supremacists fractured the skull of a young white Unitarian Universalist minister, Reverend James J. Reeb, in Selma. Three men were arrested by Selma city police for the armed assault, released on bail, and immediately re-arrested by the FBI for charges of violating Reeb's civil rights.
- British and South African police detectives in Durban, South Africa, recovered 20 gold bars, valued at $280,000, that had been missing from the ocean liner Capetown Castle for more than a month. The bars, shipped by the South African government and entrusted to the Bank of England, had been reported missing on February 5 when the ship had docked at Southampton. The value was based on the international price of gold at the time of 35 dollars per troy ounce and the weight (400 oz t or 12.4 kg) of each bar. Fifty years later, in March 2015, the price of gold was $1,226.14 per ounce, a gold bar would be worth $490,456 and twenty bars would be worth more than 9.8 million dollars.
- The United States launched OSCAR 3, the third in the Orbiting Satellite Carrying Amateur Radio series, and the first to have a transponder to allow amateur radio operators to communicate with each other. Over the next two weeks, "more than 100 amateurs in 16 countries" were able to talk to each other until the satellite's batteries ceased working.
- U.S. President Johnson authorized the use of a newer, more flammable version of napalm B for the anti-personnel bombs dropped by American bombers in Vietnam.
- Born: Benito Santiago, Puerto Rican American Major League Baseball player, 3-time Gold Glove Award and 4-time Silver Slugger Award winner; in Ponce, Puerto Rico
- Died: Kazys Boruta, 60, Soviet Lithuanian poet

== March 10, 1965 (Wednesday) ==
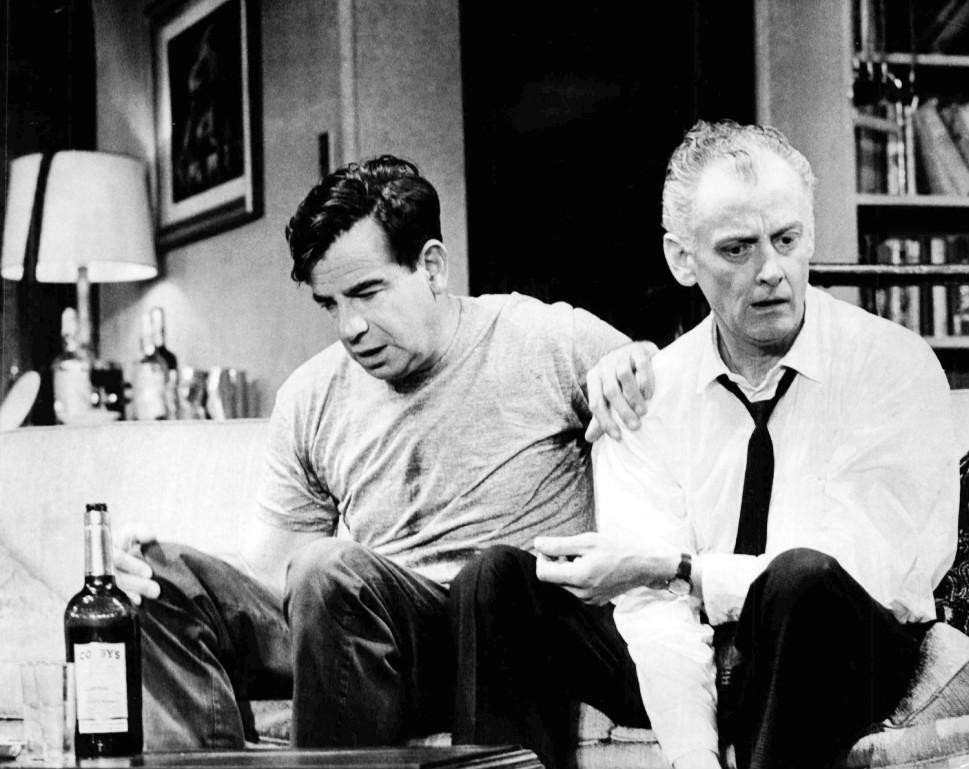
Matthau and Carney as Oscar and Felix

- The Odd Couple, a play by Neil Simon, debuted on Broadway at the Plymouth Theatre, with Walter Matthau as Oscar Madison and Art Carney as Felix Ungar. Simon would say later that he based the characters on a situation involving his meticulously tidy older brother, writer Danny Simon, who had had to share an apartment with a disheveled theatrical agent and friend, Roy Gerber, following a divorce. The characters of Oscar and Felix would be reimagined in many versions over the next half-century, including two films (with Matthau and Jack Lemmon); a 1970s television show (Jack Klugman and Tony Randall); and, more recently, a 2015 TV sitcom with Matthew Perry and Thomas Lennon.
- The first drawings were held under Australia's new birthday lottery system of conscription. At the Department of Labor and National Service in Melbourne, Representative Dan Mackinnon drew marbles from a barrel as part of the "birthday ballot" until there were sufficient eligible men to meet the quota of 4,200 draftees. The results were kept secret, with a policy that "Although pressmen will be able to watch and photograph the drawing of the first marble they will not be allowed to see or photograph the number on it." Young men whose birthdays were selected were "balloted out" and would be notified within four weeks.
- In France, the cabinet of President Charles de Gaulle approved a bill to remove many of the restrictions placed on married women, in what Information Minister Alain Peyrefitte described as "a veritable emancipation of the wife". The new bill, drafted by Justice Minister Jean Foyer, was expected to be passed by the French parliament. At the time, married women were not allowed to take a job, open a bank account, or spend their own earnings without their husband's consent.
- Robert Komer, President Johnson's adviser on the Middle East, met with Israel's Prime Minister Levi Eshkol in Tel Aviv, seeking to get the Israelis to agree to bring their nuclear program under the jurisdiction of the International Atomic Energy Agency. However, the only concession that Eshkol would agree to in the "Memorandum of Understanding" signed between the two nations was a reaffirmation that "Israel will not be the first to introduce nuclear weapons into the Arab-Israeli area."
- The MacDonald House bombing, Indonesia's only successful attack on the Malay peninsula during the Konfrontasi war over Java, killed three people and injured 33 others in Singapore. The two young Indonesian Marine Corps operatives who had carried out the attack, Harun Said and Osman Mohamed Ali, would be executed by hanging in 1968.
- The United Kingdom and Norway signed an agreement on the maritime boundary between the two nations in the North Sea. Rather than the former line based on the Norwegian trench, the British and Norwegian governments agreed that the median line of points equidistant from both mainland coasts would serve as the boundary.
- The engagement was announced by the Naatherlands royal family of Princess Margriet of the Netherlands and Pieter van Vollenhoven, who would become the first commoner and the first Dutchman to marry into the Dutch royal family.
- Goldie, a London Zoo golden eagle, was recaptured 12 days after her escape.
- Born: Rod Woodson, American NFL Hall of Fame cornerback; in Fort Wayne, Indiana
- Died:
  - José "El Piloto" Castro Veiga, 50, Galician guerrilla and terrorist, was executed in Spain
  - Daisy Lampkin, 81, African-American suffragette and civil rights activist

== March 11, 1965 (Thursday) ==
- Operation Market Time, the U.S. Navy complement to the aerial bombing in Operation Rolling Thunder, began off the coast of North and South Vietnam with patrols along the coast, and 40 miles (64 km) and 150 miles (240 km) offcoast, in order to disrupt North Vietnam's supply lines to the Viet Cong in the south. Unlike the strikes against inland supply lines, the naval operation "proved to be very successful" and cut off the sea supply routes during the war. The first attacks would take place on March 15, as fighter-bombers took off from the aircraft carriers USS Ranger (CV-61) and USS Hancock (CV-19) to bomb an ammunition dump at Phu Qui.
- The first sit-in at the White House was carried out by 12 young men and women who were staging a civil rights protest. The group arrived at the U.S. presidential residence as part of a tour group but, once inside the central corridor, dropped to the floor, demanded to meet President Johnson, and refused orders to leave. Three went home voluntarily, but the others stayed for 7 hours until they were forcibly removed under police escort.
- Ireland's Prime Minister Seán Lemass dissolved the Dáil Éireann, the nation's lower house of parliament, and called for new elections, after his Fianna Fáil party lost one seat in a by-election and another to the death of the incumbent. New elections would take place on April 7.
- The city of Inver Grove Heights, Minnesota (with a current population of about 34,000) was created by the merger of Inver Grove and Inver Grove Township.
- Born:
  - Jesse Jackson Jr., African-American Congressman for Illinois; in Greenville, South Carolina
  - Laurence Llewelyn-Bowen, British designer and television presenter; in Kensington, London
- Died: James Reeb, 38, white Unitarian Universalist minister, died two days after receiving severe head injuries received in a beating by white supremacists in Selma, Alabama.

== March 12, 1965 (Friday) ==
- A reporter for the Chicago Daily News, Margery McElheny, broke the story that former Governor of West Virginia William C. Marland had been working for the last two and a half years as a taxicab driver in Chicago. Marland, who had served as a state governor ten years earlier, from 1953 to 1957, told reporters at a press conference the next day that he was a recovering alcoholic, and that after being fired from a job as legal counsel for a coal company, he had been working since August 1962 for the Flash Cab Company. Marland, who had been chauffeured while governor, said that he had been driving passengers in an effort "to compose my character, which had fallen apart" as he rehabilitated himself. Marland would receive job offers after his story was told nationwide, including in his own appearance on The Jack Paar Show on March 26, but would soon be diagnosed with pancreatic cancer, and would die on November 26.
- A longshoreman named Teddy Deegan was found murdered in Chelsea, Massachusetts. It would be noted later that the murder "would not even qualify as a footnote in Boston mob annals except for one crucial outcome; four men were wrongly imprisoned for decades for his murder, and the case became a cause célèbre and a lesson in the miscarriage of justice." In 1967, Joe Barboza would confess to the murder, but would also accuse Joe Salvati, Peter J. Limone, Louis Greco, and Henry Tameleo of being his accomplices. The four men would be sentenced to life in prison, where Tameleo and Greco would die of old age. Salvati and Limone would spend 30 years behind bars before an enterprising investigative reporter, Dan Rea, would find the evidence that led to their release in 1997.
- The third Test of New Zealand's 1964–65 cricket tour of India opened at the Brabourne Stadium, Bombay.
- Born:
  - Steve Finley, American major league outfielder and five time Gold Glove Award winner; in Union City, Tennessee
  - Coleen Nolan, English-Irish singer, television personality, and author; in Blackpool, Lancashire

== March 13, 1965 (Saturday) ==
- A week after a White House meeting with Martin Luther King Jr., President Johnson met with Alabama Governor George Wallace to discuss the recent events in Selma, and to seek Wallace's support for federal efforts toward African-American voting rights and the right of peaceful assembly for all races. After the meeting, Johnson and Wallace appeared at a press conference, and said, "This March week has brought a very deep and painful challenge to the unending search for American freedom... before it is ended, every resource of this government will be directed to insuring justice for all men of all races in Alabama and everywhere in this land." He described the recent Bloody Sunday in Selma as "an American tragedy". Wallace told the press that he would consider Johnson's recommendations and that he recognized the right of peaceful assembly, "but there are limitations."
- Three weeks after the assassination of Malcolm X, his former bodyguard and potential successor, Leon 4X Ameer, was found dead in a room at the Sherry-Biltmore Hotel in Boston. However, a Boston medical examiner concluded that Ameer, 31, had a history of epilepsy, had "died in a coma while peacefully in bed", and police found "no signs of a struggle and no visible marks of violence on the body".
- Thailand and Malaysia signed an agreement at Songkhla, a town on the Thai side of the border of the two nations, to combine operations against guerrilla and terrorist incursions.
- Born: Pamela Andersson, Swedish journalist for Expressen and the magazine Amelia; in Hudiksvall
- Died:
  - Corrado Gini, 80, Italian statistician, demographer, and sociologist, best known for developing the Gini coefficient as a measure of income inequality
  - Fan Noli, 83, founder of the Albanian Orthodox Church and one-time Prime Minister of Albania

== March 14, 1965 (Sunday) ==
- Israel and West Germany established diplomatic relations, one week after an announcement made by German Chancellor Ludwig Erhard and nearly twenty years after the defeat of Nazi Germany. The next day, the Foreign Ministers of 13 Arab nations, already meeting in Cairo, announced that they would sever relations with the West Germans, and ordered the immediate recall of their ambassadors from Bonn. Four nations (Saudi Arabia, Morocco, Libya, and Tunisia) later declined to break with West Germany, while six others (Egypt, Iraq, Yemen, Algeria, Kuwait, and the Sudan) announced that they planned to establish stronger relations with East Germany.
- Former Soviet Union leader Nikita Khrushchev appeared in public for the first time since he had been fired from his positions as First Secretary of the Communist Party and Prime Minister five months earlier. Khrushchev and his wife, Nina, were casting their votes in Moscow's city elections and arrived at the Moscow University Club, where he was applauded by "a cluster of citizens", who let him come to the head of the line. The election monitor who greeted him handed him a ballot without asking him to show his internal passport, and Khrushchev joked, "How come you're trusting me and letting me vote without identification? You used to be stricter in the past."
- Che Guevara returned to Cuba after a three-month tour of the world and found himself in disfavor with the government. Behind closed doors, "Every one of Che's possible political 'offences' were brought up; his flirtation with Beijing, his digs at the economic systems of the 'fraternal' socialist countries, his polemics against Cuba's Communist old guard and his personal criticism of Castro. Above all, though, there was the withering attack he had made on the Soviet Union in Algeria in February 1965." Guevara would soon resign his government position and even renounce his citizenship, then travel elsewhere in the world to foment revolution.
- Experienced American mountain climbers Daniel Doody and Craig Merrihue, both 31 years old, fell over 1,000 feet (300 m) to their deaths while climbing a difficult route on Mount Washington in preparation for an upcoming trip to the Himalayas. Doody, of North Branford, Connecticut, had served as photographer on the 1963 American expedition to Mount Everest, while Merrihue was a physicist at the Smithsonian Astrophysical Observatory in Cambridge, Massachusetts.
- The first round of municipal elections was held for all the cities in France, with almost 950,000 candidates for 470,000 offices. Runoff elections would be held a week later for any office where a candidate had not received a majority, with the top two vote-getters being on the ballot for the second round.
- Born:
  - Kevin Williamson, American TV producer known for creating The Vampire Diaries and Dawson's Creek; in New Bern, North Carolina
  - Aamir Khan, Indian Bollywood film actor, director, and producer; in Bombay (now Mumbai)
  - Kevin Brown, American baseball pitcher; in Milledgeville, Georgia
- Died: Stanko Premrl, 84, Slovenian Roman Catholic priest and composer of the Slovenian national anthem, the Zdravljica

== March 15, 1965 (Monday) ==
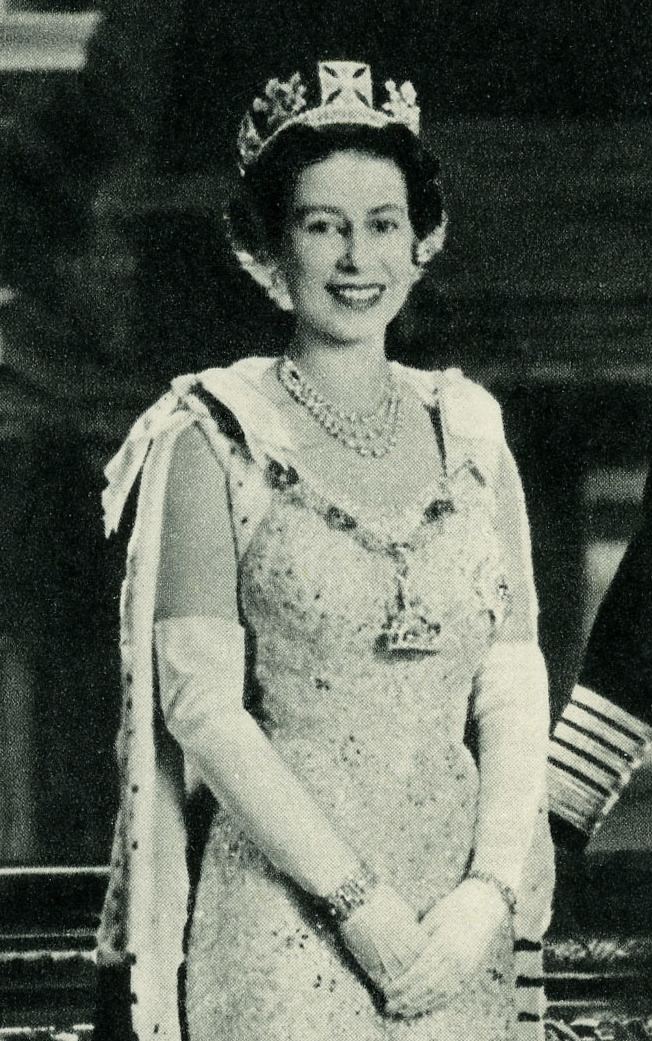
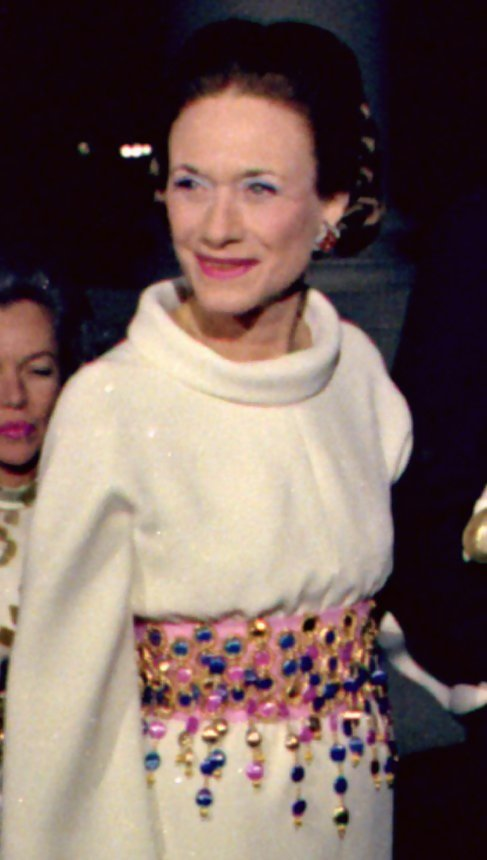
Queen Elizabeth II and Wallis, Duchess of Windsor
- Queen Elizabeth II ended the ostracism of the Duchess of Windsor, the former Mrs. Wallis Warfield Simpson, 28 years after her uncle, formerly King Edward VIII, had abdicated the throne in order to marry the divorced American. The decision was occasioned by Edward's illness and surgery, and the meeting took place at his bedside at The London Clinic. "When the 68-year-old duchess curtsied to the queen," UPI would report, "it ended the bitterness in the royal family over the duke's marriage..."
- President Johnson spoke to a joint session of Congress and a nationwide television audience to call for federal legislation that would become the Voting Rights Act of 1965. The speech would be remembered for his repeated reference to an African-American song, "We Shall Overcome". "Experience has clearly shown that the existing process of law cannot overcome systematic and ingenious discrimination," Johnson said. "No law that we now have on the books—and I have helped to put three of them there—can ensure the right to vote when local officials are determined to deny it.... What happened in Selma is part of a far larger movement which reaches into every section and State of America. It is the effort of American Negroes to secure for themselves the full blessings of American life. Their cause must be our cause too. Because it is not just Negroes, but really it is all of us, who must overcome the crippling legacy of bigotry and injustice. And we shall overcome." The bill would be introduced in the Senate on March 17, pass the House, with amendments, on August 3 by a 328–74 vote, and by 79–18 the next day in the Senate, and would be signed into law on August 6, 1965.
- Frank Bossard, a member of Britain's Secret Intelligence Service who had been selling information to the Soviet Union for four years about British military radar and guidance systems, was arrested by Special Branch agents at the Ivanhoe Hotel in Bloomsbury in London's West End. A Soviet defector, code-named "Top Hat", had alerted British intelligence of Bossard's activities, and when he made reservations for the Ivanhoe on March 12, agents trailed him from the Ministry of Aviation to the hotel. When he emerged from his room after a little more than an hour, two officers searched him and found four classified file folders, photography equipment, and exposed rolls of 35 millimeter film. On May 10, he would be sentenced to 21 years in prison.
- South Africa announced a tougher policy of strict racial segregation of the races in sporting events, going beyond the existing rule of separate sections for white and non-white (black and coloured) spectators. Under the new regulations, non-whites were barred from even attending events at venues in predominantly white districts, and whites could not venture into non-white events. Michiel De Wet Nel, the Minister of African Administration, and Pieter Botha, the Minister of Community Development announced the new policy. On average, 25 percent of the spectators at soccer games had been non-white.
- Gamal Abdel Nasser was re-elected to another term as President of the United Arab Republic (formerly Egypt) and, once again, without opposition in a yes or no vote. The government would report that 6,950,652 out of 6,951,196 voters approved Nasser and that only 65 voted against him. The other 479 ballots were declared void.
- The first TGI Fridays restaurant was founded, by businessman Alan Stillman, who purchased The Good Tavern, located at 63rd Street and First Avenue and named the chain for the expression "Thank God It's Friday".

== March 16, 1965 (Tuesday) ==
- Following the example of Buddhist monks who had performed self-immolation, 82-year old Alice Herz stood at the corner of Grand River Avenue and Oakman Boulevard in Detroit, doused herself with two cans of flammable cleaning fluid, then set herself ablaze. Though she was not a "Holocaust survivor" as reported in some accounts, Mrs. Herz had fled Germany in 1933 after the Nazis took power, and left France in 1940 after the German invasion, and she did stay temporarily in an internment camp for refugees before emigrating to the United States in 1942. She left a note that said, "I choose the illuminating death of a Buddhist to protest against a great country trying to wipe out a small country for no reason." Two bystanders smothered the flames, but Mrs. Herz died of her burns 10 days later.
- Mounted deputies of the Montgomery County Sheriff's Office violently broke up a civil rights demonstration in Montgomery, Alabama, due to an order given by Circuit Solicitor David Crosland, who apologized later for a "mixup in signals". Riding on horseback and swinging clubs and canes, officers rode into a crowd of about 600 marchers of the Student Nonviolent Coordinating Committee; 14 people were injured, and eight of them were hospitalized. A second march of 1,200 people, made after the organizers obtained a parade permit, took place without incident.
- Born: Mark Carney, Canadian economist and politician, Prime Minister of Canada since 2025, in Fort Smith, Northwest Territories

== March 17, 1965 (Wednesday) ==
- Frank M. Johnson, Jr., the federal judge for a U.S. District Court in Montgomery, ruled in favor of the right of civil rights protesters to march along U.S. Highway 60 from Selma to Montgomery, and issued an injunction barring Alabama state and county authorities from interfering with the march, and ordered law enforcement agencies (that had recently attacked previous demonstrators) to protect the marchers.
- Jackie Robinson, who in 1947 had become the first African-American Major League Baseball player in modern times, was hired by the ABC television network as the first African-American broadcaster for nationally televised baseball games. Robinson and Leo Durocher, who was in temporary retirement from managing a team, would handle the commentary on 27 games.
- Tanks from the Israeli Defense Force crossed into Syria in the first of four raids to destroy heavy mechanical equipment to be used in diversion of the Jordan River.
- Died: Amos Alonzo Stagg, 102, American college football coach from 1892 to 1932 for the University of Chicago and, after being forced to retire at age 70, for the College of the Pacific from 1933 to 1946.

== March 18, 1965 (Thursday) ==
- Soviet cosmonaut Alexei Leonov left the airlock on his spacecraft Voskhod 2 for 12 minutes and 9 seconds, becoming the first person to "walk in space". The Voshkod ship was launched into orbit at 1:00 p.m. from Baikonur (10:00 a.m. in Moscow and 3:00 a.m. in Washington), and 90 minutes later, on the second orbit, as the ship was passing over the Soviet Union, Leonov exited the two-man capsule while 307.5 miles (494.9 km) above the Earth, the highest man had ever been into space at that time. Lieutenant Colonel Leonov, secured by a 5-meter (16 ft) long tether and equipped with oxygen, spent 12 minutes floating free during his time outside, while his crewmate, Colonel Pavel Belyayev, remained at the controls. When Leonov tried to re-enter the safety of the Voshkod airlock, he found that he could not bend enough to get through the narrow opening, as a result of the greater stiffness of the pressurized suit, rather than a "ballooning", since the dimensions remained the same in both a vacuum and normal conditions. After a struggle that sent his pulse rate to 168 and consumed most of his remaining oxygen supply, Leonov reduced the pressure from 400 hPa to 270 and "with the urgent desperation of a doomed man, elbowed and fought his way back in to the safety of the airlock."
- Mick Jagger, Brian Jones, and Bill Wyman of The Rolling Stones were cited by police after publicly urinating on the wall of a garage in Stratford, London, following an argument with an attendant who refused to let them use the bathroom because of their long hair. On July 22, the three would be fined five pounds apiece and 15 guineas court costs for "insulting behaviour". The senior court magistrate in West Ham, A.C. Morey, would admonish them: "Just because you have reached extreme heights in your profession, this does not mean you have the right to act like this. You should set a standard of behaviour, a moral pattern for all your very large number of supporters."
- The Convention on the Settlement of Investment Disputes Between States and Nationals of Other States, also known as "The Washington Convention", was opened for signature in Washington, D.C.; it would take effect on October 14, 1966, after 20 nations had ratified it, and it created the International Centre for Settlement of Investment Disputes (ICSID). The Convention provided a neutral investment arbitration mechanism to resolve disputes between signing nations and foreign investors.
- A general election began in the Democratic Republic of the Congo, with balloting to continue through April 3. The Congolese National Convention party, led by Moise Tshombe, won a plurality of 38 of the 167 seats in the Chamber of Deputies.
- Died:
  - King Farouk I of Egypt, 45, who had been dethroned and sent into exile in 1952 when his nation became a republic, collapsed from a heart attack during dinner in Rome. Farouk, who weighed 285 pounds (129 kg) and had lived the playboy life on a vast personal fortune estimated at 250 million dollars, was dining at the Ile de France restaurant with an unidentified female companion when he "collapsed face down into the remains of a meal of oysters, roast lamb, pastry and fruit".
  - John Larry Kelly Jr., 41, American scientist best known for his 1956 work in creating the Kelly criterion formula, died of a stroke

== March 19, 1965 (Friday) ==
- Cosmonauts Pavel Belyayev and Alexei Leonov returned to Earth in the Voskhod 2 capsule, the day after its launch. The capsule was "enveloped in flames" caused by the friction during re-entry into the Earth's atmosphere, but was able to successfully deploy its chutes and made a landing near Perm, more than 800 miles (1,300 km) away from the usual landing site for Soviet missions. For the next two years (including all of 1966), the Soviets would not launch any more crewed space missions. During that time, while the USSR worked on developing its Soyuz program generation of spacecraft, the United States would launch 10 consecutive Project Gemini flights with 16 different astronauts (four participating twice). A commentator would write four years later that "Before the U.S. started flying its Gemini spaceships, Russia's manned space dominance was unquestioned throughout the world. From 1961 through 1965, their Vostok and Voshkod spaceships and cosmonauts flew rings around the U.S. and scored one triumph after another... While this was occurring U.S. spacemen continually were too little and too late.... Then, in classic tortoise-and-hare fashion, the Russians inexplicably stopped launching spaceships in the spring of 1965."
- The wreck of the SS Georgiana, which sank on March 19, 1863, was discovered in 1965 by E. Lee Spence, and may or may not have been found on March 19. In 2008, an unidentified editor to Wikipedia would add the statement that "Spence found the wreck exactly 102 years after the 'Georgiana's' loss", and newspapers began repeating the phrase from Wikipedia for the syndicated "Today in History" column, although there is no indication that Spence himself made any claim that his 1965 discovery came on an anniversary of any sort.
- A team led by American biologist Robert W. Holley published the paper "Structure of a Ribonucleic Acid" in the weekly journal Science, first describing the structure of transfer RNA (tRNA), the molecule that "reads" the genetic code encoded by DNA to bring together the correct sequence of amino acids in cellular proteins. Holley would be awarded the Nobel Prize in Physiology or Medicine in 1968 for his discovery.
- Indonesian President Sukarno announced the nationalization of foreign oil companies Stanvac, Caltex, and Royal Dutch Shell.

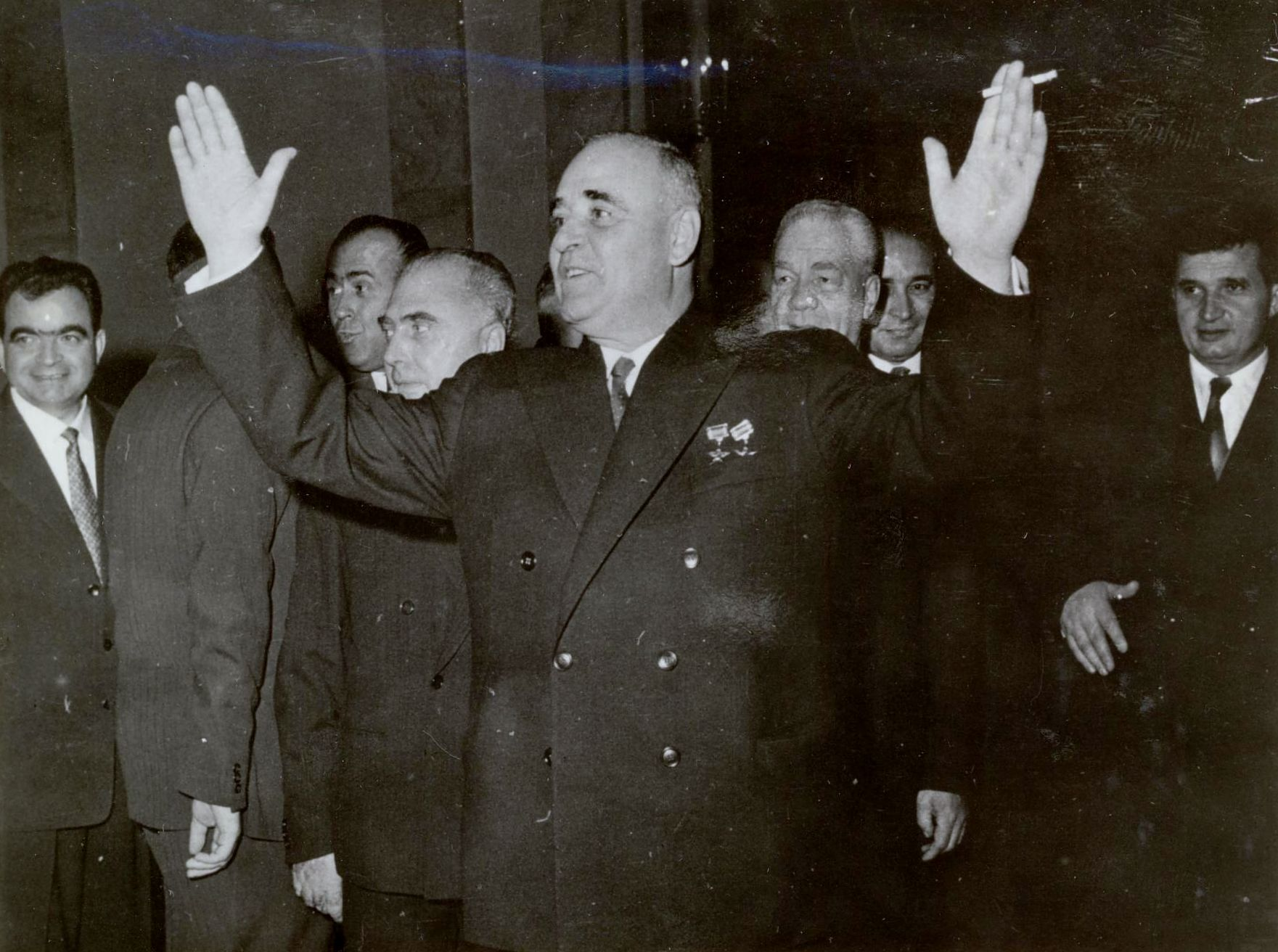
Gheorghe Gheorghiu-Dej (centre) and Nicolae Ceausescu (far right) in 1961

- Died: Gheorghe Gheorgiu-Dej, 63, President of Romania and General Secretary of the Romanian Communist Party, died at 5:43 p.m. in Bucharest from complications of lung cancer and liver cancer that had not been detected by his doctors despite a thorough physical examination less than a year earlier. The Romanian people were not notified of his illness until the day before he died. Nicolae Ceaușescu would become the new General Secretary and de facto leader, while Chivu Stoica would be selected as the new president the following week.

== March 20, 1965 (Saturday) ==
- After hearing from General Harold K. Johnson, the U.S. Army Chief of Staff, that it would take five years of fighting and 500,000 American troops to win the Vietnam War, the Joint Chiefs of Staff recommended to Secretary McNamara to change the American mission from being "not simply to withstand the Viet Cong... but to gain effective operational superiority and assume the offensive", and that two additional divisions of combat troops be transferred to South Vietnam for that purpose. "To turn the tide of war," the memo said, "requires an objective of destroying the Viet Cong, not merely to keep pace with them, or slow their rate of advance."
- At 1:30 in the morning, President Johnson issued an Executive Order from the LBJ Ranch in Texas, federalizing the Alabama National Guard and authorizing U.S. Secretary of Defense Robert McNamara to send U.S. Army troops to protect civil rights marchers between Selma and Montgomery, Alabama. The move came hours after Alabama's Governor Wallace sent Johnson a telegram saying that he was "willing to do whatever is necessary to maintain peace and order", but that he concurred with the state legislature, which had voted against paying the $12 per day wages for each state guard member, that the state was "financially unable to bear this burden."
- President Johnson approved an expansion of Operation Rolling Thunder, to escalate bombing of the "Ho Chi Minh trail" that was the supply line for the Viet Cong.
- An Aeroflot airliner crashed after landing short of the runway at the Khanty-Mansiysk airport at the end of its flight from Tyumen, killing all 42 passengers and one of its five-member crew.
- The UCLA Bruins, coached by John Wooden, defeated the Michigan Wolverines, 91–80, to win the NCAA basketball championship. The finals, played in Portland, Oregon, marked the end of the 23-team tournament. The syndicated broadcast was seen in much of the U.S. on 135 participating television stations. Gail Goodrich scored 42 points to give UCLA its second consecutive title.
- Altitude Chamber Tests of Gemini spacecraft No. 4, involving five simulated flights, began at McDonnell. The first run was uncrewed. In the second run, the prime crew flew a simulated mission, but the chamber was not evacuated. The third run repeated the second, with the backup crew replacing the prime crew. The fourth run put the prime crew through a flight at simulated altitude, and the fifth did the same for the backup crew. Altitude chamber testing ended March 25, and the spacecraft was prepared for shipment to Cape Kennedy.
- "Poupée de cire, poupée de son", sung by France Gall (music and lyrics by Serge Gainsbourg), won the Eurovision Song Contest 1965 for Luxembourg. This is considered to have been the first pop song to win the Eurovision contest.

== March 21, 1965 (Sunday) ==
- The third march from Selma to Montgomery began at 12:48 in the afternoon, as Martin Luther King Jr. and Ralph Bunche led 3,200 marchers from outside the Brown Chapel A.M.E. Church at 410 Sylvan Street, out of town, and to the other side of the Edmund Pettus Bridge, farther than the first two marches were able to get. Protected from white counterdemonstrators by regular army troops and federalized Alabama guardsmen, the group proceeded east along the 54-mile (87 km) stretch of U.S. Highway 80 before stopping for the night. As part of the federal court order permitting the march, all but 300 of the group had to depart after having walked 7 miles (11 km), while the rest got onto a chartered train to return to Selma until they could rejoin the marchers in Montgomery. The ones who remained stayed in large tents set up by organizers on the side of the highway. March 21 had been selected as the new Sunday date because it was the fifth anniversary of the Sharpeville Massacre in South Africa.
- René Barrientos, president of Bolivia, was wounded by a gunman in an assassination attempt while his jeep was being driven past the city of Cochabamba. Barrientos, who had survived seven previous attempts on his life, was on his way back to La Paz from a visit to his hometown of Tarata when an assassin on a motorcycle pulled alongside him and fired with a machine gun. Although wounded in the right hip, Barrientos survived being struck by several bullets that hit his chest, because he was wearing a bulletproof vest.
- Homemade time bombs were found in five locations in African-American neighborhoods in Birmingham, Alabama. The first was located inside a black Roman Catholic church, wired to 30 sticks of dynamite. Others were located at a lawyer's house, a funeral parlor, outside of a high school, and in a home that had once been occupied by the brother of Martin Luther King Jr.; the bombs were all disarmed by demolition experts from the U.S. Army base at Fort McClellan.
- The second round of municipal elections, for those races where no candidate in the first round had attained a majority, took place in France. Candidates of the French Communist Party (Parti communiste français, or PCF) gained a majority in the city councils of Le Havre, Nîmes, and seven other cities, giving the PCF the lead in "34 out of the 159 towns with population of 30,000 or more".
- NASA launched Ranger 9 at 4:37 p.m., the last in a series of uncrewed lunar space probes to scout for potential sites for the first astronaut landings on the Moon.
- King Idris appointed Hussein Maziq as the new prime minister of Libya after the resignation of Mahmud al-Muntasir.

== March 22, 1965 (Monday) ==
The world's three color TV systems in 1965

- Two days before the opening of a European conference in Vienna to discuss a common system of color television, France announced that it had signed an accord with the Soviet Union to adopt the French version, SECAM (Séquentiel couleur avec mémoire), which was competing with West Germany's PAL (Phase Alternating Line) system. The result at the Vienna Conference would be that all of the other Western European nations except France would use PAL, while SECAM would be used in Eastern Europe and France. North America and much of Latin America would use the NTSC (National Television System Committee) standard.
- Quoting Associated Press photographer Horst Faas and unidentified sources, AP reporter Peter Arnett broke the story that U.S. and South Vietnamese forces were using gas warfare in combat. Though he emphasized that these were "non-lethal" gases dispensed by helicopters and bombers, Arnett wrote that "one gas reportedly causes extreme nausea and vomiting, another loosens the bowels". Hours after the story was revealed, a spokesman for the U.S. Department of Defense confirmed for afternoon papers the story about the use of gas, but said that it was only being used by "South Vietnam's armed forces". Two days later, U.S. Secretary of State Dean Rusk would hold a press conference to respond to the controversy saying, "We are not embarking upon gas warfare in Vietnam. There has been no policy decision to engage in gas warfare in Vietnam. We are not talking about agents or weapons that are associated with gas warfare... We are not talking about gas that is prohibited by the Geneva Convention of 1925."
- Nicolae Ceauşescu was unanimously elected the new First Secretary by the Central Committee of the Romanian Communist Party and the nation's de facto leader, three days after the death of Gheorghe Gheorgiu-dej. Of the seven members of the Politburo, three were "ruled out from the post by virtue of their ethnic background" and Ceauşescu and Alexandru Drăghici were the two most powerful men in the Party. However, Ceauşescu had been the Secretary for organization in the Central Committee since 1955 and most of the committee members had owed their positions to him. Drăghici, as Minister of Internal Affairs and in control of the Securitate secret police, was feared by many of the same people. Drăghici would be forced to resign as Minister four months later.
- In Ceylon's parliamentary elections, Prime Minister Sirimavo Bandaranaike, her Sri Lanka Freedom Party, and the Sinhalese ethnic majority suffered a landslide defeat, losing 34 of their 75 seats in the 151-member House of Representatives. The United National Party, led by Dudley Senanayake and supported by the nation's minority, the Tamils, more than doubled its share of seats, from 30 to 66, and combined forces with the 14 seats of another Tamil group, the Illankai Tamil Arasu Kachchi (ITAK), to obtain a majority in the House.
- All 29 people on Avianca Flight 676 from Bogota to Bucaramanga were killed when the Douglas DC-3 crashed into the 7,200-foot (2,200 m) tall Pan de Azucar mountain peak while flying through a storm.
- Born:
  - Rick Harrison, American businessman, reality television personality, and owner of the Gold & Silver Pawn Shop which is featured on the History series Pawn Stars; in Lexington, North Carolina
  - Steve Toussaint, British actor and writer, best known for playing Lord Corlys Velaryon in the HBO fantasy series House of the Dragon; in Birmingham, England

== March 23, 1965 (Tuesday) ==
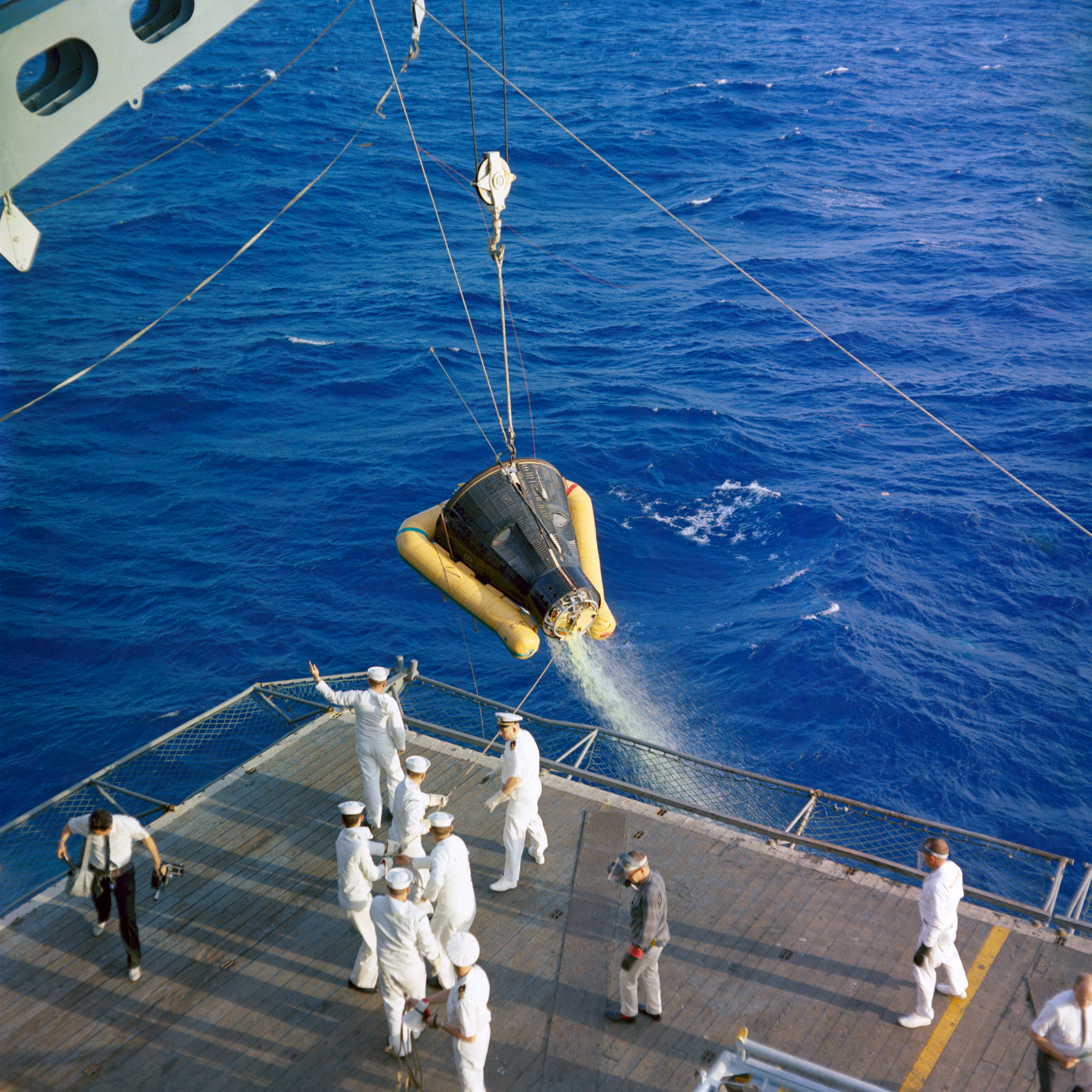
March 23, 1965: Molly Brown with flotation collar after splashdown

- The United States launched Gemini 3, the first crewed mission of the Gemini program, the nation's first space mission with two astronauts, and the first maneuverable spacecraft from any nation, from complex 19 at Cape Kennedy at 9:24 a.m. EST. The crew were command pilot Astronaut Virgil I. Grissom and pilot Astronaut John W. Young. The Gemini capsule (named for the "Unsinkable Molly Brown" by Grissom, who managed to escape his Mercury-Redstone 4 capsule in 1961 before it sank) made three orbits around the Earth. During the flight, Grissom altered the orbit, rotating it 180 degrees on its horizontal axis (yaw) "so the crew faced backward", then aligned it with the horizon so that it was "flying sideways", before slightly changing the direction of its orbit. At 1:45, the Molly Brown was brought in for a landing as it passed over Hawaii, and splashed down in the Atlantic Ocean 33 minutes later at 2:18 p.m. Landing point accuracy was unexpectedly poor. The spacecraft landed about 60 nautical miles (110 km; 69 mi) from its nominal landing point. The crew had to remain afloat until a helicopter could transport them to the prime recovery ship, the aircraft carrier USS Intrepid (CV-11). Seasick and uncomfortably hot after the capsule had rocked during the wait, Grissom would note, "Gemini may be a good spacecraft, but she's a lousy ship." It was discovered after the flight ended that Young, who admitted that he did not eat his dehydrated lunch, had smuggled a corned beef sandwich on board. NASA reprimanded Young and Grissom because of the danger that floating breadcrumbs might have damaged the ship's electronics.
- In Morocco, a declaration by King Hassan II, requiring students to be at least 17 years old to enroll in advanced high school classes, triggered several mass protests, which were violently repressed. Analysts concluded that 103 rioters and six police were killed over two days.
- Died: Mae Murray, 79, American film star of the 1920s. At her height in 1926, she had amassed a fortune of about three million dollars (equivalent to more than $40 million in 2016), before breaking her contract with MGM Studios, but was broke ten years later. She spent her final years at the Motion Picture & Television Country House and Hospital, a retirement community supported by contributions from people in the film and television industry.

== March 24, 1965 (Wednesday) ==
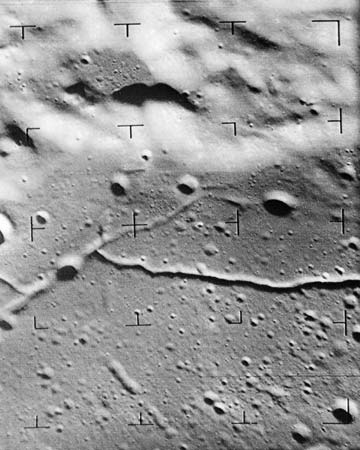
March 24, 1965: The Moon on live television

- Ranger 9 impacted into the Alphonsus crater on the Moon at 9:08 a.m. Eastern Time, after taking 6,150 high resolution photos and transmitting them to Earth. For the first time, viewers were able to watch lunar photos on live television as the digital data from the probe was being assembled.
- U.S. Senator Robert F. Kennedy became the first person to reach the top of the 13,900-foot (4,200 m) tall Mount Kennedy in the Saint Elias Mountains of Canada, located in the Yukon Territory. Kennedy was part of an eight-man team sponsored by the National Geographic Society and the Boston Museum of Science, seven of whom were experienced mountain climbers, including Jim Whittaker, the first American to reach the summit of Mount Everest, and Dee Molenaar. After the peak, never before climbed, was named in honor of the late John F. Kennedy in 1964, his brother Robert was invited to be part of the expedition. The other experts stopped a few feet below the summit to let the Senator plant flags and place a memento at the top.
- The first "teach-in" on the Vietnam War took place at Angell Hall at the University of Michigan, with 49 members of the faculty speaking, and was attended by 2,500 participants in the antiwar movement over the next two days. Because the university would not allow the event on campus during regular class hours, the faculty started at 8:00 in the evening and conducted presentations until 8:00 the next morning. The organizer, the Faculty Committee to Stop the War in Viet Nam, set an event at Columbia University the next night and at 25 other universities over the following three weeks.
- Geneticists Mary Weiss and Boris Ephrussi published the first report of the production of what they described as "the first viable interspecific hybrids", the crossing of genetic material of cells from two different species (in this case, a rat and a mouse). Over a month's time, they had grown a culture of several different cells that had increased with 25 cell divisions.
- India reimposed President's Rule on the state of Kerala, with control of the state being administered by the national government until a stable state government could be restored. Administration from Delhi would continue until 1967.
- Born: The Undertaker (stage name for Mark William Calaway), American professional wrestler; in Houston, Texas

== March 25, 1965 (Thursday) ==
- Martin Luther King Jr. and 25,000 or more civil rights activists successfully ended the 4-day march from Selma, Alabama, to the capitol in Montgomery. While at the capitol, King gave a speech titled "How Long, Not Long" ("I know you are asking today, 'How long will it take?'. Somebody's asking, 'How long will prejudice blind the visions of men...' How long? Not long, because 'no lie can live forever'. How long? Not long, because 'you shall reap what you sow'... How long? Not long, because the arc of the moral universe is long, but it bends toward justice.") About 300 of the group had marched the entire way, stopping each night to camp out. Dr. King missed one of the days in order to travel to Cleveland. After arriving at the State Capitol, a group of marchers tried unsuccessfully to present a petition to Governor Wallace, who declined to meet with them, and sent his executive secretary Cecil Jackson, in his place.
- Hours later, the peaceful events of the day were marred by the murder of Viola Liuzzo, a white, 39-year-old Detroit homemaker with five children. Liuzzo was shot dead by Ku Klux Klan members as she was driving between Selma and Montgomery with Leroy Moton, a 19-year-old African-American. As her car stopped at a red light on U.S. Route 80, another car containing four members of the local Klan (one of them an FBI informant named Gary Rowe) pulled up alongside her. When the Klan saw Liuzzo and Moton in the car together, they began chasing her as she tried to outrun them and as soon as they caught up, they began firing shots at Liuzzo's car. As a result from the gunfire, she was shot twice in the head, causing her to lose control of her car and immediately succumbed from her wounds. On the other hand, Moton survived by playing dead when the Klan went to investigate Liuzzo's car.
- West Germany's Bundestag voted, 344–96, to extend the statute of limitations on Nazi war crimes, set to expire on May 8, 1965, the 20th anniversary of Germany's surrender, for an additional five years up to 1970, and Justice Minister Ewald Bucher resigned the same day, on grounds that the change violated Germany's Constitution. In 1969, the deadline for indicting a war criminal would be extended to 1980, and in 1979, the limitation on prosecution for murder and genocide would be removed completely.
- Born:
  - Sarah Jessica Parker, American stage, film and television actress and TV producer, best known for the Sex and the City TV and film series; in Nelsonville, Ohio
  - Stefka Kostadinova, Bulgarian athlete and holder, since 1987, of the women's world record for the high jump, at 2.09 meters (6 feet, 10 1/4 inches); in Plovdiv
  - Avery Johnson, American NBA and college basketball coach and player; in New Orleans

== March 26, 1965 (Friday) ==
- In Birmingham, Alabama, FBI agents arrested four members of the Ku Klux Klan (Eugene Thomas, William Orville Eaton, Collie LeRoy Wilkins, Jr. and Gary Tommy Rowe, Jr.) and charged them with conspiracy to violate the civil rights in the murder of Viola Liuzzo. In announcing the arrests, President Johnson urged that Congress investigate white supremacist organizations and made an appeal to all such groups and said, "Get out of the Klan now, and return to a decent society, before it is too late." Thomas, Rowe, and Eaton were all released when bonds of $50,000 apiece were posted.
- Indonesia's Information Minister issued "Ministerial Decision No. 29/SK/M/65", titled "Basic Norms for Press Enterprises within the Context of the Promotion of the Indonesian Press". All newspapers were required to identify themselves as being formally linked to a political party, "a functional group" or another type of mass organization. Additionally, the editorial and managerial staff had to be selected by the affiliated political party, so that the Ministry could hold the party responsible for content.
- Harold Pinter's play The Homecoming, which would win a Tony Award for Best Play in 1967, and another in 2008 for Best Revival of a play, was performed for the first time before an audience. The world première took place at the New Theatre, Cardiff, by the Royal Shakespeare Company directed by Peter Hall, prior to opening at the Aldwych Theatre on London's West End on June 3, and at the Music Box Theatre on Broadway on January 3, 1966.
- A Pakistan International Airlines flight from Peshawar to Chitral crashed into a mountain peak at 9,000 feet, killing 22 of the 26 people on board. Four passengers were the only survivors.
- The United Arab Republic offered the United States the Temple of Dendur, which had already been taken apart and prepared for shipment.
- Kirill Mazurov became the new First Deputy Premier of the Soviet Union, second in governmental rank to Prime Minister Alexei Kosygin.
- Died: Alice Herz, 82, who had immolated herself 10 days prior

== March 27, 1965 (Saturday) ==
- Pope Paul VI met with his commission on birth control on the third day of their meeting to determine whether they had reached a conclusion on recommendations about the Roman Catholic policy toward contraception in time for his scheduled pre-Easter speech. The commission, created by the Pope in June 1964, whose work was kept secret, was said to have been composed of "40 to 50 experts from a dozen nations" including moral theologians, physicians, psychiatrists, and population study specialists.
- In Rabat, a Moroccan firing squad executed 14 people who had been convicted of plotting to overthrow King Hassan II.
- The Norwegian tanker SS Nora collided with the Liberian ship MV Otto N. Miller off the coast of Eastbourne in the English Channel. Both ships caught fire and there was a large oil spill. Trygve Tyse, the captain of the Nora, ordered his crew to abandon ship, then remained on board to fight the fire.

== March 28, 1965 (Sunday) ==
- An estimated 470 people were killed in the El Cobre dam burst and landslide that followed a 7.1 magnitude earthquake in central Chile. The 220-foot (67 m) high El Cobre Dam broke and water and debris poured down into the valley below, where employees of the El Soldado copper mine and their families lived. The town of El Cobre, near La Calera, was swept away along with more than 60 homes. The earthquake struck at 12:38 p.m. on a Sunday, when public places and churches were filled, and shook the area for more than 60 seconds.
- Erland Kops of Denmark won the men's singles title at the 1965 All England Open Badminton Championships at Wembley Arena, London.
- Died:
  - Dr. Gordon Seagrave, 68, Burmese surgeon and missionary who built dozens of hospitals and trained hundreds of residents as nurses and surgical aides.
  - Mary, Princess Royal and Countess of Harewood, 67, third child and only daughter of King George V and aunt of Queen Elizabeth II.
  - Jack Hoxie, 80, American Western film star

== March 29, 1965 (Monday) ==
- After a three-year testing period that had started with the beginning of Operation Ranch Hand on December 29, 1961, the United States moved into the second phase of the operation with the heavy use of defoliants and herbicides in combat zones. Initially, four tactical herbicides, codenamed Purple, Pink, Green and Blue, were used, with Purple, a combination of 2,4-dichlorophenoxyacetic acid (2,4-D) and 2,4,5-trichlorophenoxyacetic acid (2,4,5-T) being the used the most. In 1967, heavy usage began of Herbicide White and the most potent of the defoliants, Herbicide Orange, which included 2,3,7,8-Tetrachlorodibenzodioxin (2,3,7,8-TCDD or dioxin) with the 2,4-D and 2,4,5-T and which would be better known as Agent Orange. In all, 208,330 drums or 1,144,722 U.S. gallons (4,333,240 L) of Orange would be used during the war, until January 7, 1971.
- Canada's House of Commons voted 159–12 to approve a bill to create the Canada Pension Plan, starting on January 1, 1966, for persons whose annual wages were $5,000 or less. Under the legislation, 3.6% of annual wages would be payable into the public pension fund and a flat monthly payment (initially $75 Canadian) would be payable to people 70 and older. The age for qualifying would be lowered annually from 70 to 65 by 1970.
- The collision of a commuter train with a derailed freight train killed 19 people and injured 33 in Nova Iguaçu, a suburb of Rio de Janeiro in Brazil.
- NASA administrators discussed extravehicular activity (EVA) on the Gemini missions and the possibility of doing more than the "stand-up" form of EVA. Director Robert R. Gilruth at Manned Spacecraft Center (MSC) and Deputy Director George M. Low met with Richard S. Johnston of Crew Systems Division (CSD) and Warren J. North of Flight Crew Operations Division. Johnston presented a mock-up of an EVA chestpack, as well as a prototype hand-held maneuvering unit. North expressed his division's confidence that an umbilical EVA could be successfully achieved on the Gemini 4 mission. The plans would be approved by NASA Headquarters.

== March 30, 1965 (Tuesday) ==
- Alabama Governor George C. Wallace met with 15 African-American civil rights leaders from the Southern Christian Leadership Conference, led by Reverend James Bevel, and received the petition that they had brought to Montgomery five days earlier. Reverend Joseph Lowery, the delegation's spokesman, said that Wallace received the group "cordially and courteously" and added, "We asked him to give us leadership in building bridges of communication in our state. We told Governor Wallace he is our governor. We are hopeful he will use his great power of leadership to bring peace to our state." A spokesman for Wallace agreed that the governor and the group had a "friendly frank discussion".
- Funeral services were held for Viola Liuzzo, at Immaculate Heart of Mary Catholic church in Detroit. Many prominent members of both the civil rights movement and government were present, including Dr. Martin Luther King Jr.; NAACP Executive Director Roy Wilkins; Congress on Racial Equality national leader James Farmer; Michigan Lieutenant Governor William G. Milliken; Teamsters President Jimmy Hoffa; and United Auto Workers President Walter Reuther.
- Sir Humphrey Gibbs, the British Governor of Rhodesia, dissolved the colonial Legislative Assembly, in hopes of ousting the Rhodesian Front (RF) government led by Prime Minister Ian Smith. New elections were ordered that would end up strengthening the Front's control of the Assembly, and Smith would unilaterally declare Rhodesia's independence as a white-minority ruled republic in November.
- The Soviet Union and the People's Republic of China signed an agreement allowing Soviet trains to travel through China to deliver economic and military aid to North Vietnam. However, Chinese leader Mao Zedong rejected a request by Soviet leader Leonid Brezhnev to allow the Soviets the privilege of overflights through an air corridor for shipments.
- A car bomb exploded in front of the U.S. Embassy in Saigon, killing 20 people and injuring 175. Most of the casualties, including 18 of the dead, were South Vietnamese bystanders. There were 47 Americans hurt, two of them fatally.
- Movie theaters throughout France joined in a protest against a new 24% tax on tickets, by giving free admission to films for everyone.
- Born: Piers Morgan (pen name for Piers Stefan O'Meara), English journalist and television presenter; in Newick, Sussex
- Died: Philip Showalter Hench, 69, American physician who was awarded the Nobel Prize in 1950 for his discoveries on the treatment of rheumatoid arthritis

== March 31, 1965 (Wednesday) ==
- An Iberia airliner crashed into the Mediterranean Sea as it was making its approach to Tangier, Morocco on a flight from Málaga. Fifty of the 53 people on board were killed, but three passengers were rescued. Almost all of the passengers had been Scandinavian tourists who were on vacation. The three survivors, a Danish couple and a Swedish woman, were rescued by a Spanish fishing boat operating eight miles from the Moroccan coast.
- Belgium, the Netherlands and Luxembourg signed a treaty creating the Benelux Court of Justice, to give advisory opinions on "uniform interpretation of common rules of law" within the three nations. Ratification of the treaty by all three was still required, and the Court would not hold its first session until May 11, 1974.
- Born: Jean-Christophe Lafaille, French mountaineer (d. 2006); in Gap, Hautes-Alpes
- Died: Mario Mafai, 63, Italian painter and founder of the Scuola Romana movement

== Date unknown ==
- Assistant Secretary of Labor Daniel Patrick Moynihan submitted a groundbreaking and controversial report for President Johnson, entitled The Negro Family: The Case For National Action, for limited circulation within government. "From December through March," a historian would later write, "Moynihan and his staff put together the document and in the process worked out a strategy of placement and presentation. At the same time, he laid the groundwork for the reception of the report by speaking from time to time to those he wished in the end to persuade. In March, the document was formally cleared by Secretary of Labor Wirtz and one hundred nicely printed and bound copies run off in the basement of the Department of Labor." After a reference by President Johnson to Moynihan's statistics and commentary concerning the roots of African-American poverty in a speech on June 4, interest in what would become known simply as "The Moynihan Report", would lead to its mass publication.
