= Eelco van Asperen =

Dutch computer scientist (1965–2013)

Eelco van Asperen (11 April 1965 – 31 May 2013) was a Dutch computer scientist. and associate professor at the School of Economicsof the Erasmus University Rotterdam, in his home city of Rotterdam.

On the first webpages created by Tim Berners-Lee, Van Asperen was credited as having contributed to the "WWW project". Van Asperen "ported the line-mode browser [to] the PC under PC-NFS; developed a curses version."

Van Asperen published several articles in scientific journals, mostly in the field of computer simulation and logistics. In 2009, he obtained his PhD at Erasmus University with the dissertation Essays on Port, Container, and Bulk Chemical Logistics Optimization.
