= 1965 French municipal elections =

The 1965 French municipal elections were held in France on 14 and 21 March 1965. As in 1959, the UDR realized deceiving results (although they did moderately gain). The Communists gained, but they also came out of their isolation and started co-operating with other parties of the parliamentary left.

== Sources ==
- History of French Local Elections
