= Charlton (surname) =

Charlton is a surname. Notable people with the surname include:

- Alethea Charlton (1931–1976), British actress
- Anthaya Charlton (born 2003), Bahamian long jumper
- Alex Charlton (born 1980), American politician
- Betty Jo Charlton (1923–2014), American politician
- Bobby Charlton (1937–2023), English footballer
- Brian Charlton (born 1947), Canadian politician
- Chris Charlton (born 1963), Canadian politician
- Conrad Charlton (1888–1976), Australian radio personality
- Daphne Charlton (1909–1991), English artist
- Dave Charlton (1936–2013), South African Formula One driver
- Devynne Charlton (born 1995), Bahamian athlete
- Eddie Charlton (1929–2004), Australian snooker player
- Edward Colquhoun Charlton (1920–1945), English soldier and recipient of the Victoria Cross
- Evan Charlton (1904–1984), British artist
- Felicity Charlton (1913–2009), British artist
- Hall Charlton (born 1979), English rugby union footballer
- Jack Charlton (1935–2020), English footballer and manager
- James Charlton (disambiguation), multiple people
- John Charlton (disambiguation), multiple people
- Joseph Charlton (born 1997), American football player
- Ken Charlton, multiple people
- Lionel Charlton (1879–1958), air commodore, senior RAF commander
- Manny Charlton (1941–2022), Spanish-born Scottish guitarist
- Margaret Ridley Charlton (1858–1931), Canadian medical librarian
- Matthew Charlton (1866–1948), Australian politician
- Meg Charlton, American writer
- Michael Charlton (journalist) (1927–2025), Australian TV journalist
- Neville Charlton (1928–2014), Australian rugby league footballer
- Norm Charlton (born 1963), American baseball player
- Percie Charlton (1867–1954), Australian cricketer
- R. Charlton (poet/songwriter) (c. 1800), of Tyneside, England
- Randy Charlton (born 1999), American football player
- Richard Charlton (1791–1852), British Consul to Kingdom of Hawaii
- Robert M. Charlton (1807–1854), American politician
- Sam Charlton (born 1991), New Zealand field hockey player
- Simon Charlton (born 1971), English footballer
- Stan Charlton (1929–2012), English footballer with Arsenal and Leyton Orient
- Stan Charlton Sr. (1900–1971), English footballer with Exeter City and Crystal Palace
- Suzanne Charlton (born 1962), BBC Weather forecaster
- Taco Charlton (born 1994), American football player
- Thomas Charlton (disambiguation), multiple people
- Tony Charlton (1929–2012), Australian TV sportscaster
- William Charlton (disambiguation), multiple people

== See also ==
- Charlton (given name)
- Charlton (disambiguation)
- Charleton (name)
- Charleston (disambiguation)
