= Thomas Jackson Charlton =

Thomas Jackson Charlton may refer to:

- Thomas Jackson Charlton (physician) (1833–1886), American physician
- Thomas Charlton (rower) (born 1934), American Olympic rower

== See also ==
- Thomas Charlton (disambiguation)
