= May 1965 =

Month of 1965

<<	May 1965					>>
Su	Mo	Tu	We	Th	Fr	Sa
						1
2	3	4	5	6	7	8
9	10	11	12	13	14	15
16	17	18	19	20	21	22
23	24	25	26	27	28	29
30	31

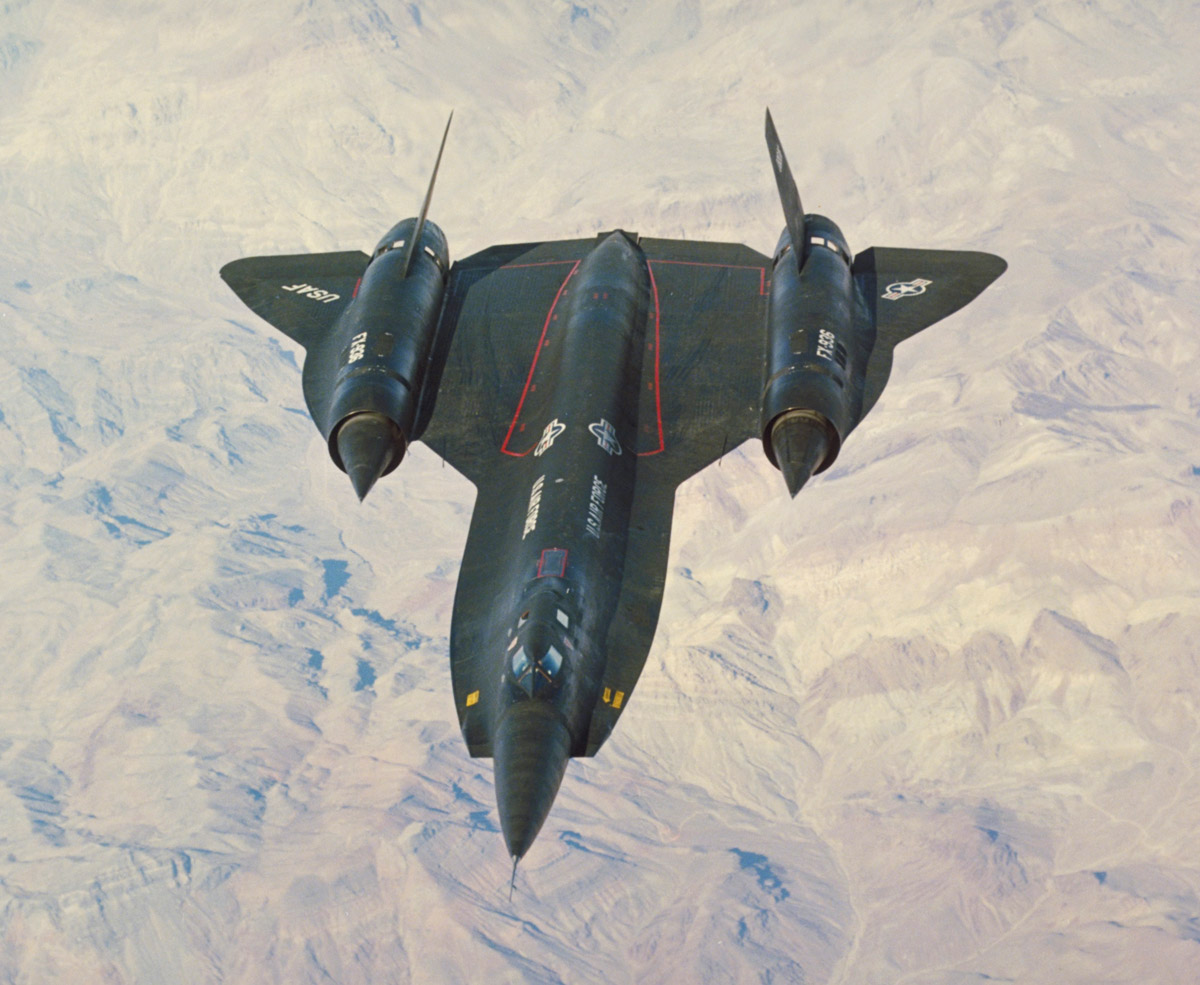
May 1, 1965: The YF-12 flies faster than any previous airplane

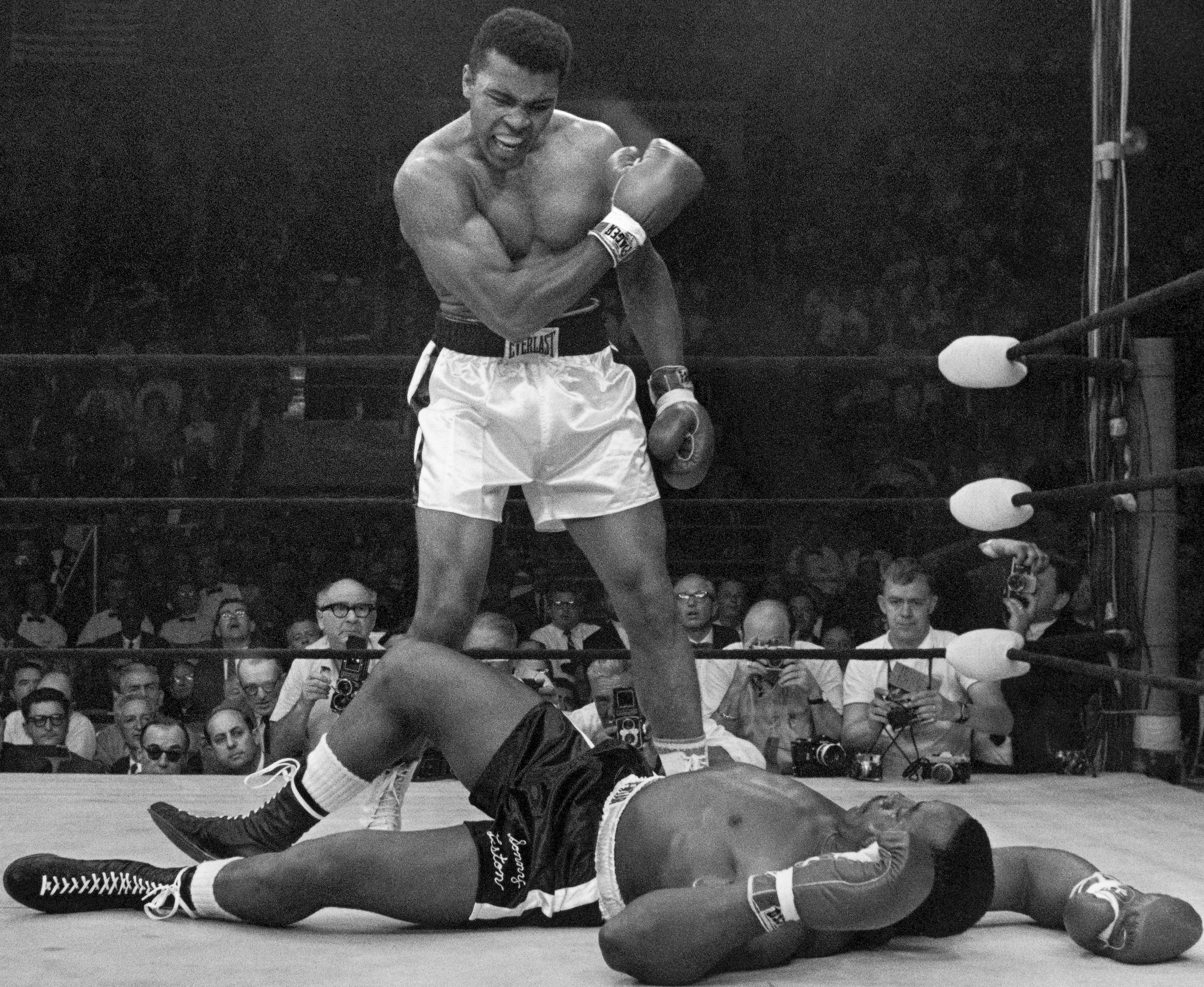
May 25, 1965: Muhammad Ali, formerly Cassius Clay, defeats former champion Sonny Liston in rematch at Lewiston, Maine

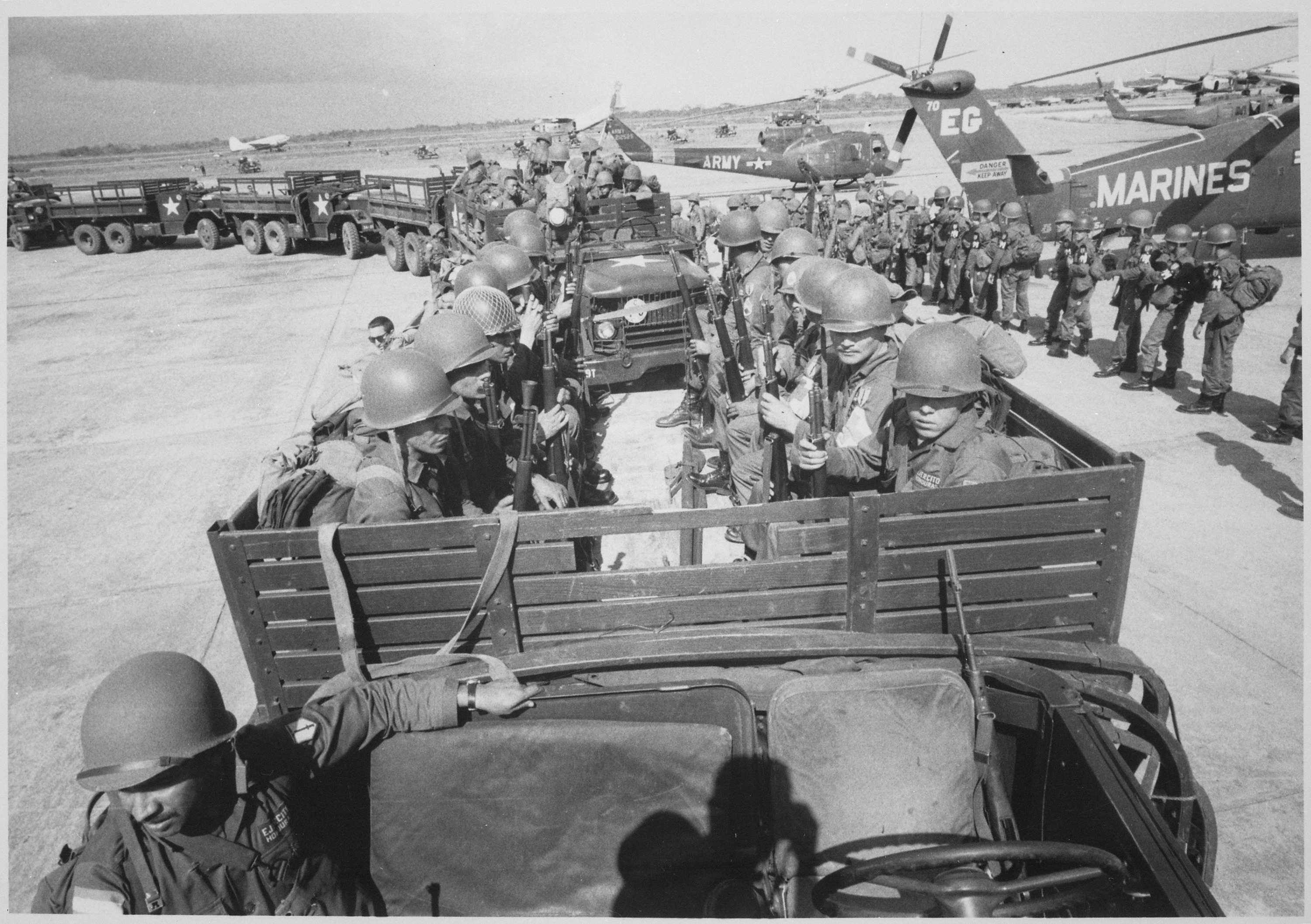
May 14, 1965: Inter-American Peace Force arrives in Dominican Republic to replace U.S. troops

The following events occurred in May 1965:

== May 1, 1965 (Saturday) ==
- Two new world records for flight speed were set by a Lockheed YF-12A jet interceptor on the same day by two different crews. On one flight, the crew broke the 2,000 mph barrier, flying at 2,070.102 miles per hour (Mach 3.27) and shattering the previous speed record of 1,665.8 miles per hour that had been set on July 7, 1962, by a Soviet Ye-166. The YF-12A also broke the record for a closed course flight (from one point to another and then back again) averaging 2,715.5 miles (4,370.2 km) per hour by flying 1,000 kilometres (620 miles) in 22 minutes, and breaking the record set by the Soviets in the Ye-166 the previous month. A new record was also set for highest sustained altitude, as the YF-12A flew for several minutes at 80,258 feet.
- The Battle of Dong-Yin took place between Taiwan and mainland China. A Republic of China Navy destroyer was patrolling the Taiwan Strait near Dongyin Island on its side of the border, when it encountered eight gunboats from the Navy of the People's Republic of China, and two sides exchanged fire as the PRC combatants attempted to encircle the ROC ship. Four of the gunboats were sunk, and two others damaged, while the destroyer returned to Taiwan with minimal damage. The news, announced from Taipei by the ROC Navy, "did not identify the Nationalist ship further".
- Liverpool won the FA Cup in extra time, beating Leeds United 2–1 before a crowd of 100,000 at Wembley Stadium. Neither side had been able to score in the 90 minutes of regulation time; three minutes into the extra time, Liverpool's Roger Hunt headed the ball in after a cross from Gerry Byrne (who had broken his collarbone early in the match); Billy Bremner equalised the score to 1–1 ten minutes later. After 113 minutes of play, Ian St John headed in the game-winner on a pass from Ian Callaghan for Liverpool's first FA cup ever.
- The Montreal Canadiens won the Stanley Cup in the seventh and deciding game of the National Hockey League best-of-seven series, beating the Chicago Black Hawks, 4–0. All seven of the series games were won by the home team; only 14 seconds after the final started, Jean Béliveau scored the first goal, and before the first 20 minutes were completed, three more were added.
- Died: Spike Jones, 53, American comedian, musician, and bandleader, died from emphysema.

== May 2, 1965 (Sunday) ==
- U.S. president Lyndon Johnson made a nationally televised speech to explain the invasion of the Dominican Republic by American troops, and said that "There are time in the affairs of nations when great principles are tested in an ordeal of conflict and danger. This is such a time for the American nations. At stake are the lives of thousands, the liberty of a nation, and the principles and the values of all the American Republics." He added that the Dominican revolution had "taken a tragic turn" and that "what began as a popular democratic revolution" was "seized and placed into the hands of a band of Communist conspirators." Johnson announced that he had ordered "2,000 extra men" to the Dominican Republic and for an additional 4,500 men to be deployed "at the earliest possible moment." "The American nations cannot, must not, and will not permit the establishment of another Communist government in the Western Hemisphere.... This is what our beloved President John F. Kennedy meant when, less than a week before his death, he told us: 'We in this hemisphere must also use every resource at our command to prevent the establishment of another Cuba in this hemisphere.'"
- South Korea President Park Chung Hee gave a speech chastising student protesters. "Dear students!" he said, "Whenever the politicians wrangle over a big issue in the National Assembly, you, without knowing the real point of the issue, take to the streets or hold discussion meetings on the campus with placards saying 'Down with the Government'... But I say this to you frankly, that you are the future masters of the nation, but you must train yourself for the job 10 or 20 more years. Then comes the time for your generation, not now..."
- Wagon Train, the popular television Western drama ended after eight seasons with the broadcast of its 272nd and final original episode. The series closer was also a television pilot with Frank McGrath's character (Charlie Wooster) telling Terry Wilson's Bill Hawks about Charlie's days working at a trading post. The pilot, Bend of the River, would not be picked up by any of the networks.
- The Intelsat I communications satellite (nicknamed "Early Bird"), launched on April 6, was moved to a stationary geosynchronous orbit, 22,300 miles above the Atlantic Ocean and began regular operations.
- The Soviet Union lost all contact with Zond 2, the interplanetary probe that it had launched toward Mars on November 30, 1964.

== May 3, 1965 (Monday) ==
- An earthquake measuring 7.5 on the Mercalli scale struck El Salvador at dawn. Heaviest damage was in the Cisneros district of the capital, San Salvador, and the neighboring cities of Delgado and Mejicanos. The official death toll was 120 people; more than 1,500 would die in a second earthquake on October 10, 1986, and "a significant number of the victims" would be "killed by the collapse of engineered structures that had been weakened in the 1965 event", most notably the 300 people dying in a five-story building that had been condemned after the 1965 earthquake.
- An article in Newsweek magazine prompted the breaking of diplomatic relations by Cambodia with the United States. Prince Norodom Sihanouk cited a report about his mother, Queen Kossamak, that had accused her of involvement in "various money-making schemes".
- President Sukarno of Indonesia called for volunteers to "dissolve the puppet state of Malaysia", both on the island of Java and on the Malay peninsula.
- The 1965 Cannes Film Festival opened.
- Born:
  - Red Rum, Irish champion Thoroughbred racehorse; in Kells, County Kilkenny (d. 1995)
  - Gary Mitchell, Northern Irish playwright; in Rathcoole
- Died:
  - Árpád Szakasits, 76, President of Hungary (1948–1949), and chairman of the Presidential Council (1949–1950) after the post of president was abolished.
  - Howard Spring, 76, British novelist and journalist

== May 4, 1965 (Tuesday) ==
- Pope Paul VI literally gave his blessing to the Italian space program, granting an audience to Luigi Broglio and a group of technicians and managers at the Vatican to discuss Broglio's successful effort in making Italy the third nation (in 1964, after the Soviet Union and the United States) to place an artificial satellite into orbit. The Pontiff of the Roman Catholic Church praised the San Marco project, saying, "You do have this deep faith; your presence here, with the humble Vicar of Jesus Christ, tells us that. The name San Marco tells us that, the name you gave your project as well as both satellites you produced, destined to carry into sidereal spaces, together with the presence of Italy, a sincere expression of complete and joyous confidence in heavenly protection too."
- Colonel Francisco Caamaño was sworn in as President of the Dominican Republic at the presidential palace in Santo Domingo, after rebel forces convened a constitutional congress and voted to have him govern until the return of exiled ex-President Juan Bosch. Addressing a crowd of 2,500 supporters in Independence Plaza, Caamaño called for the immediate withdrawal of the 14,000 American troops that had arrived in the Caribbean nation during the past week.
- The split capital investment trust, a form of investment that allows investors to choose between two or more classes of shares of stock, was introduced. The New York City offices of the British firm Samuel Montagu & Co. launched the program as the Dualvest Limited Fund.
- The American version of That Was the Week That Was, hosted by David Frost on the NBC television network, was shown for the last time.

== May 5, 1965 (Wednesday) ==
- Forty male students at the University of California, Berkeley stood in front of the city's draft board office and burned their draft cards, introducing what would become a common form of antiwar protest and a refusal to join the war effort. The 40 UC students were among hundreds who marched to the draft board after a noon rally on the Berkeley campus. "While Berkeley police photographers snapped their photos," an Associated Press report noted, "the students squatted in a huddle like a football team and placed their burning cards in a small pile." Although future draft-card burnings would be made in opposition to the Vietnam War, the initial protest was against the U.S. invasion of the Dominican Republic. A spokesman for the Selective Service System noted that U.S. law required "that a registrant must have his draft card with him at all times" and that the general practice when a registrant was unable to produce his draft card was to have him "reported to his local draft board, which sometimes treats me as a delinquent and speeds up his induction."
- "Boss Radio", a music programming format that relied on less talking by the disc jockeys, shorter commercials, and more frequent play of the most popular songs of the week, was introduced by a Los Angeles radio station, KHJ-AM. The concept, developed by Bill Drake and Gene Chenault, along with Gary Mack and Les Turpin, relied on playing of the same 33 songs throughout the day, punctuated occasionally by older records. The planned debut had actually been for May 19, but a disgruntled news announcer at KHJ revealed the plan to rival radio station KFWB, so KHJ disc jockey Don Steele rushed the Boss Radio format on the air the same afternoon; KFWB retreated from stealing the KHJ idea. The "more music, less talk" format would quickly be adopted by other radio stations in the United States.
- Iberia Airlines Flight 401 from Madrid crashed while attempting to land at the airport at Tenerife in the Canary Islands, killing 30 of the 49 people on board. The Super Constellation plane had aborted one landing attempt in heavy fog, and on the second approach, it struck farm equipment located about 150 feet (46 m) from the edge of the runway.
- The Organization of American States (OAS) voted 14 to 5 to create an "Inter-American Peace Force" to occupy the Dominican Republic until order could be restored. Opposing the measure were Chile, Ecuador, Mexico, Peru and Uruguay.

== May 6, 1965 (Thursday) ==
- By a margin of only four votes, Prime Minister Harold Wilson's plan for nationalization of the majority of the British steel industry was approved by the House of Commons. At 10:00 p.m., voting began and the measure barely passed, 310–306, with Wilson's Labour Party in support, and ten members of the Liberal Party joining with the Conservative Party in opposition. Six Labour MPs who were unwell did not appear for the vote. One Labour MP, Leslie Spriggs, was brought in because he was recovering from a heart attack, and announced his vote while lying in an ambulance parked in a courtyard, and Labourite Barbara Castle checked out of a hospital so that she could be present. The Labour Party had to make a compromise to its plans for a total nationalization of the industry in order to obtain the votes of two of its members, Woodrow Wyatt and Desmond Donnelly.
- By day's end, the Labour Party's four vote majority in Commons was cut to only three as Conservative Party member Reginald Eyre overwhelmingly defeated his two opponents to win the by-election to fill the vacancy left when Labour's Aubrey Jones resigned to serve on the Prices and Incomes Board.
- Earlier in the day, the winds tore the roof off the elementary school in Shell Lake, Wisconsin at 9:40 in the morning while 307 students and teachers were in the ten classrooms, but there were no injuries.
- A tornado outbreak near the Twin Cities (Minneapolis and St. Paul) in Minnesota killed 13 people and injured 683. Spring Lake Park and Mound, Minnesota were hardest hit, with four fatalities apiece.
- Died: Una Marson, 60, Jamaican-born British feminist, died from a heart attack.

== May 7, 1965 (Friday) ==
- The Rhodesian Front political party, led by Prime Minister Ian Smith, retained its majority in the general election for the House of Assembly. The election was held using two rolls, an "A" roll, which was largely white (getting votes from 95,208 whites and 2,256 blacks) for the 50 seats set aside for white candidates, and a "B" roll, mostly African, for 15 seats reserved for colony's African majority population.
- The limestone carrier freighter SS Cedarville collided with a Norwegian freighter, SS Topdalsfjord, while both were traveling in the Straits of Mackinac that separate the Upper Peninsula of Michigan and the rest of the state, and connect Lake Michigan and Lake Huron. Twenty-five members of the crew of 35 were rescued, but two died while floating in the cold waters, and eight others went down with the ship.
- President Johnson signed legislation providing an additional $700,000,000 toward fighting the Vietnam War. The resolution had passed the U.S. Senate by a vote of 88 to 3, and the U.S. House of Representatives by a vote of 408 to 7. At the ceremony, Johnson said, "America keeps her promises. And we will back up those promises with all the resources that we need."
- Brigadier General Antonio Imbert Barrera of the Dominican Air Force was named as the president of the Dominican Republic by the military regime, replacing Colonel Pedro Bartolomé Benoit, who had been installed ten days earlier. Meanwhile, the rebels opposing the government claimed Colonel Francisco Caamaño as the president.
- The 173rd Airborne Brigade, the first major ground combat unit of the United States Army to be deployed in the Vietnam War, arrived in South Vietnam, with two infantry battalions landing at the Bien Hoa Air Base. In all, the "Sky Soldiers" of the 173rd Airborne had 3,500 men and the brigade would remain until August 25, 1971.
- Born:
  - Owen Hart, Canadian-born American professional wrestler known as "The Blue Blazer", who was killed when he fell 78 feet (24 m) while being lowered to a match during a pay television event; in Calgary (d. 1999)
  - Norman Whiteside, Northern Ireland soccer football player and the youngest player (in 1982 at age 17) to appear in the World Cup; in Belfast
- Died:
  - Alf Bjørnskau Bastiansen, 81, Norwegian priest and politician
  - Charles Sheeler, 81, American photographer

== May 8, 1965 (Saturday) ==
- Randy Matson became the first person to hurl a standard shot put more than 70 feet (21 m). Matson, competing at an athletic meet at Texas A&M University in College Station, Texas, threw the 16-pound (7.3 kg) sphere 70 feet, 7 1/4 inches (21.52 meters). The current record, set in 1990, is 75 feet, 10 inches (23.12 meters).
- The Association for the Advancement of Creative Musicians (AACM) was founded in Chicago.

== May 9, 1965 (Sunday) ==
- Construction began on what would become the Chu Lai Air Base in South Vietnam, as a unit of the U.S. Naval Mobile Construction Battalion, NMCB-10, began the task of putting in the first combat zone "Short Airfield for Tactical Support" (SATS). The team would have a 4,000-foot (1,200 m) runway in place within 23 days and the first airplanes would land on June 1.
- A passenger bus with 40 people on board ran off of the road near Ixtapan de la Sal in Mexico, and plunged into the 450-foot (140 m) deep Calderón River Ravine, killing most of the people on board.
- Luna 5 was launched toward the Moon by the Soviet Union on a multi-stage rocket. The probe's attitude control system would fail on several occasions along the way.
- Pianist Vladimir Horowitz returned to the stage after a 12-year absence, performing a legendary concert in Carnegie Hall in New York.
- Born: Steve Yzerman, Canadian National Hockey League player and later general manager for the Detroit Red Wings, winner of the 1989 Lester B. Pearson award for most valuable player in the regular season, the Conn Smythe Trophy in 1998 for most valuable player in the NHL playoff, inductee to the Hockey Hall of Fame, and named in 2017 to the NHL's list of 100 Greatest NHL Players league history; in Cranbrook, British Columbia
- Died:
  - Ernesto de Martino, 56, Italian anthropologist, historian, and philosopher.
  - Leopold Figl, 62, Chancellor of Austria from 1945 to 1953, died from kidney cancer.Thomas Chorherr, Große Österreicher (Great Austrians) (Vienna: Carl Ueberreuter, 1985)

== May 10, 1965 (Monday) ==
- Warren Buffett, an investor from Omaha, Nebraska and a recent millionaire, completed three years of purchasing stock in the Berkshire Hathaway Company, a financially ailing textile manufacturer, achieved a controlling interest, and fired the former president, Seabury Stanton. Buffet's initial motivation was revenge against Stanton for an insult that arose when Stanton verbally offered to buy Berkshire's existing stock at the rate of $11.50 per share, but then sent a written agreement changing the terms to $11.375 per share. Over the next decades, Buffet would transform Berkshire Hathaway into a $500 billion conglomerate that now owns GEICO Insurance, Dairy Queen restaurants, Helzberg Diamonds, the Fruit of the Loom company and large shares of other corporations.
- The Rolling Stones began recording their signature song, "(I Can't Get No) Satisfaction" at Chess Studios in Chicago.
- Born:
  - Linda Evangelista, Canadian model; in St. Catharines, Ontario
  - Kiyoyuki Yanada, Japanese voice actor; in Tokyo (d. 2022)
- Died:
  - I. T. A. Wallace-Johnson, 71, Sierra Leonean workers' leader, journalist, activist, and founder of the United National People's Party, was killed in an auto accident while in Ghana.
  - Hubertus van Mook, 70, Governor-General of the Dutch East Indies from 1942 to 1948, prior to its independence as Indonesia

== May 11, 1965 (Tuesday) ==
- More than 10,000 people were killed over a nine-hour period as a powerful cyclone swept across East Pakistan (now Bangladesh). The 100-mile-per-hour winds affected an area of 20,000 square miles, and caused its greatest damage in the Barisal District. East Pakistan governor Abdul Monem Khan announced on May 19 that the death toll was 12,003 people.
- The National Trust officially launched Enterprise Neptune, its long-term project to acquire or put under covenant a substantial part of the Welsh, English and Northern Irish coastline.
- Born: Monsour del Rosario, Philippine taekwondo champion, action film star, and politician; in Manila

== May 12, 1965 (Wednesday) ==
- Luna 5 impacted the Moon at 10:08 p.m. Moscow time, three days after it was launched by the Soviet Union on a multi-stage rocket. However, a failure of its attitude control system only 40 kilometres (25 miles) from the Moon caused Luna 5 to land more than 700 kilometres (430 miles) from its intended target.
- West Germany formally established diplomatic relations with Israel. Even before government spokesman Karl Gunther von Hase announced the agreement in Bonn, three Arab nations (Saudi Arabia, Syria, and Iraq) announced that they were severing their ties to West Germany.
- Born:
  - Renée Simonsen, Danish supermodel; in Aarhus
  - Mark Thomas, British sprinter; in Blackburn, Lancashire

== May 13, 1965 (Thursday) ==
- Astronomers Arno Penzias and Robert W. Wilson of Princeton University submitted their paper to The Astrophysical Journal, describing their discovery at the Bell Telephone Laboratories of cosmic microwave background radiation as a confirmation of the "Big Bang" theory of the origin of the universe. As Penzias would describe it later, New York Times science writer Walter Sullivan "apparently had a 'mole' in The Astrophysical Journal editorial office", and on May 21, a Sullivan story with the headline "Signals Imply a 'Big Bang' Universe" would appear on the front page of the Times. Penzias and Wilson, who had made their observations from a hilltop station in Holmdel, New Jersey, would share the Nobel Prize in Physics in 1978 for their discovery.
- A West German court of appeals condemned the behavior of ex-defense minister Franz Josef Strauss, and refused to open trial against magazine proprietor Rudolf Augstein and the magazine's military expert Conrad Ahlers, ruling that during the Spiegel affair Strauss had exceeded his authority and committed Freiheitsberaubung (deprivation of personal freedom). However, because it was found that he operated under the "belief of acting lawfully" (Verbotsirrtum), he was exempted from punishment.
- Former First Lady Jacqueline Kennedy made her first public appearances since the funeral of President John F. Kennedy on November 25, 1963. Accompanied by her family in London, Mrs. Kennedy took her daughter and son to witness the changing of the guard at Buckingham Palace in London.
- The Wet Mock Simulated Launch of Gemini 4 was completed.
- Born:
  - José Antonio Delgado, Venezuelan mountaineer and paraglider; in Caracas (died of hypothermia, 2006)
  - Tim "Youngblood" Chapman, American bounty hunter and co-star of Dog the Bounty Hunter; in Ventura, California
  - Hikari Ōta, Japanese television comedian; in Kamifukuoka, Saitama Prefecture
- Died: Dick Wantz, 25, American baseball pitcher who had appeared in his first and only major league game (for the California Angels) on April 13 died one day after undergoing surgery for a brain tumor.

== May 14, 1965 (Friday) ==
- The first 270 members of the "Inter-American Peace Force" arrived in the Dominican Republic on behalf of the Organization of American States (OAS). The units consisted of 250 soldiers from the Army of the Honduras, and 20 policemen from Costa Rica, which did not have an army.
- Born: Eoin Colfer, Irish children's author; in Wexford
- Died:
  - Frances Perkins, 85, U.S. secretary of labor for 12 years (1933–1945) and the first woman to serve as a member of the U.S. president's cabinet.
  - Belva Gaertner, 80, American woman who was acquitted of murdering her lover Walter Law in a 1924 trial

== May 15, 1965 (Saturday) ==
- An avalanche came down from West Germany's highest mountain, the Zugspitze, onto the Hotel Schneefernerhaus near Garmisch-Partenkirchen, burying dozens of skiers and tourists. Until missing persons could be located, officials feared that as many as 90 people had been killed; ultimately, the death toll was 10. The resort was in its final week of the 1964–1965 season and temperatures were above 16 °C (61 °F) degrees when melting snow loosened and triggered the disaster.
- President Johnson ordered the United States Mint to resume production of silver dollars for the first time since 1935, with directions that 45 million new coins would be minted and that "they will be distributed in the areas of the country where the silver dollar has traditionally been used as a medium of exchange". However, because of a shortage of silver and uncertainty about the metal composition, dollar coins would not be reintroduced until 1971.
- Qualification of the G4C extravehicular suit was completed. This suit was basically the same as the G3C suit except for modifications which included a redundant zipper closure, two over-visors for visual and physical protection, automatic locking ventilation settings, and a heavier cover layer incorporating thermal and micrometeoroid protection. Six G4C suits would be at the launch site for the Gemini 4 flight crews by the end of May.
- New Zealand's prime minister Keith Holyoake opened the Benmore Dam on South Island.

== May 16, 1965 (Sunday) ==
- While waiting to take off on a mission, a B-57B Canberra jet bomber exploded on the ground at Bien Hoa Air Base, Vietnam. This set off a chain of secondary explosions that destroyed 21 other airplanes at the base, killed 27 U.S. Air Force personnel, and injured 99 people. Among the dead was 34-year-old USAF Major Robert G. Bell, who in 1959 had been one of the 32 finalists for NASA Astronaut Group 1 that eventually was narrowed to the "Mercury Seven". The initial explosion happened at about 8:25 in the morning, and a serviceman at the scene would write later that the series of explosions that followed (many of them from bombs with delayed fuses) "lasted about three hours... Napalm, 500 lb. and 700 lb. demolition bombs, frag bombs and 50 caliber ammunition went off like Chinese fireworks." USAF major general Joseph H. Moore estimated that the disaster destroyed 10 percent of the B-57 bombers that comprised the American nuclear fleet. Sabotage was ruled out, and the accident was eventually traced to a loose turbine on the B-57B hitting the fuse of an armed 500-pound (230 kg) bomb.
- Major General Wladislaw Tykocinski of the Army of Poland, the senior foreign diplomat in West Berlin, asked the United States to grant him political asylum. Tykocinski, who left his wife and child behind in East Berlin, approached an American serviceman, 1st Sgt. Marion H. Tomlinson, at a delicatessen.
- U.S. Army Lt. General Marshall S. Carter, formerly the deputy director of the CIA, became the new director of the National Security Agency, replacing USAF Lt. General Gordon A. Blake.
- Born:
  - Krist Novoselic, American bass guitarist for the grunge rock band Nirvana; in Compton, California
  - Jason (pen name for John Arne Sæterøy), Norwegian cartoonist; in Molde
- Died: Wing Luke, 40, Chinese-American lawyer and politician, was killed in a plane crash.

== May 17, 1965 (Monday) ==
- Gasoline stations affiliated with the Cities Service Company changed their signs to reflect the new name, "CITGO", as well as a new symbol and new colors, as part of a $20,000,000 marketing changeover. Through a spokesman, the Oklahoma-based oil producer (later acquired as a subsidiary of Petróleos de Venezuela) announced that "The distance from which the new CITGO emblem and color scheme can be seen is twice that of the previous green and white Cities Service signs and stations." Stanley D. Breitweiser went on to say that the name had been chosen from "more than 80,000 possible choices" generated by a computer programmed to create new five-letter words that began with "C", and that the logo, colors and name had been developed with the assistance of the design firm of Lippincott and Marguiles. He explained that "Its first portion, CIT, is derived from Cities Service. GO implies the company's power, energy and progressive nature."
- An underground explosion at Cambrian Colliery in Clydach Vale, Wales, killed 31 men and injured another 13. The victims had been laboring 850 feet (260 m) underground, in a space only 32 inches (810 mm) high, and had no chance to evacuate; those who died "were identified by the numbers on their lamps".
- Born:
  - Trent Reznor, American singer and songwriter and founder of the industrial rock band Nine Inch Nails; in New Castle, Pennsylvania
  - Chan Man-lok, Wo Shing Wo triad member who was one of the perpetrators in the infamous Hello Kitty murder case

== May 18, 1965 (Tuesday) ==
- President Johnson formally launched Project Head Start, a $112,000,000 program to give summertime education to more than half a million American preschool age children from underprivileged families. According to the announcement from the White House, "the first 1,676 projects... at 9,508 centers will reach 375,842 boys and girls at a cost of $65,686,741", with the vast majority of the money coming from federal grants.
- Dolby Laboratories was founded in London by American inventor Ray Dolby, who invented the Dolby noise-reduction system and other innovations in audio recording technology.
- Died: Eli Cohen, 40, Israeli spy, was executed in public in Syria. With the verdict of the court attached to his shirt, Cohen was taken to a gallows at the Garden of Martyrs Square in Damascus and hanged. His body remained on display for six hours before it was taken down.

== May 19, 1965 (Wednesday) ==
- American inventor Paul C. Fisher filed for the patent on the "Anti-gravity pen", known also as the "space pen", which used "a pressurized ink supply which enables the pen to write when the force of gravity acts against the flow of ink in the ink cartridge" in order for astronauts to write data observations in a weightless environment. Although there is an urban legend that NASA spent millions of dollars to develop an unnecessary replacement to a pencil, Fisher was privately funded and earned his costs back when both the American and Soviet space programs began purchasing pens, which were necessary because of the hazards of broken pencil tips, graphite dust, and flammable wood; the pens themselves were sold for six dollars apiece. U.S. Patent Number 3,285,228 would be granted on November 15, 1966.
- A single sounding rocket successfully sent aloft a "mother-daughter" experiment to transmit radio signals between two instrument packages that parted in flight and climbed separately through the ionosphere. The experiment, employing a technique developed by scientists of Penn State University, was launched at 4:11 p.m. EDT by a four-stage Jevelin (ARGO D0-4) from the National Aeronautics and Space Administration's Wallops Island Station, Wallops Island, Virginia.

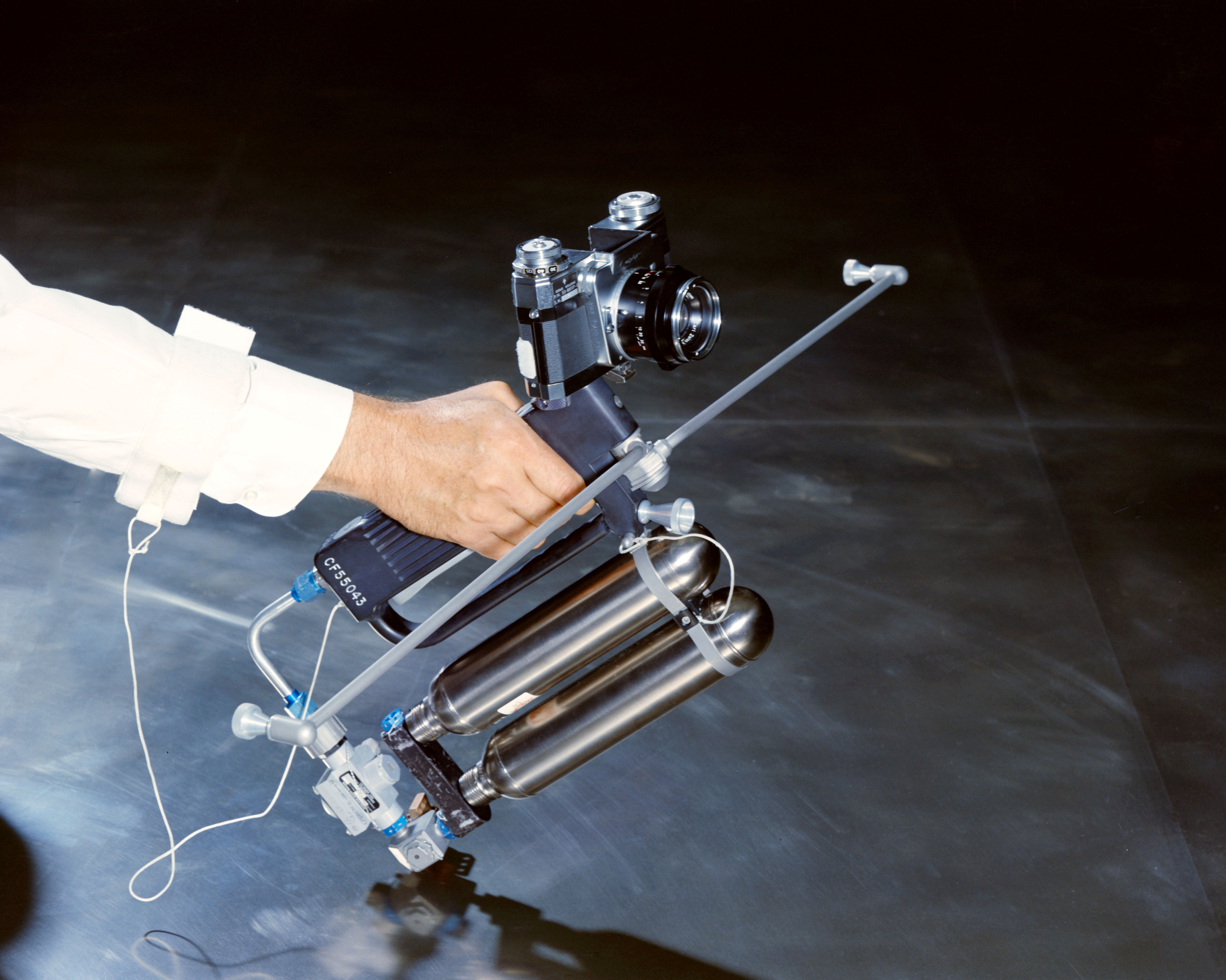
The Hand-Held maneuvering unit

- Qualification of all extravehicular equipment planned for the Gemini 4 mission, including the ventilation control module, the extravehicular umbilical assembly, and the hand-held maneuvering unit, was completed. The flight hardware was at the launch site ready for flight at the end of May.
- The roof of the Key Food Supermarket in Brooklyn, New York, collapsed without warning upon the area closest to the checkout lines, injuring 25 employees and shoppers.

== May 20, 1965 (Thursday) ==
- Pakistan International Airlines Flight 705, a Boeing 720 airliner with 127 people on board, crashed in a desert area in Egypt as it was approaching the Cairo airport on arrival from Dhahran, Saudi Arabia. All 13 members of the crew and 121 of the passengers were killed when the plane came in too low during its approach, and impacted about six miles south of Cairo. The plane was making the inaugural flight in PIA's new service from Karachi to London, and nearly all of the victims had been invited as guests, including 21 members of the Pakistani press who were assigned to cover the story.
- The De Havilland Canada DHC-6 Twin Otter made its first flight.
- Born: Eric Norris, American former stock car racing driver and stuntman; in Redondo Beach, California, son of actor and martial arts champion Chuck Norris

== May 21, 1965 (Friday) ==
- Pitcher Ron Herbel of the San Francisco Giants, described by one author as the player who "deserved to be the poster child for the designated hitter rule", got his first hit in a major league baseball game, after going hitless in his first 54 at bats. Herbel, who pitched the Giants to an 8–1 win over the Houston Astros, was playing his first indoor game, at the Astrodome. He would finish his career in 1971 with the lowest batting average (.029) of any career major leaguer, as well as a career ERA of 3.83.
- The largest ever teach-in began at Berkeley, California, attended by 30,000 people who gathered at the University of California campus for "Vietnam Day". "This brilliantly provocative event”, an historian would observe later, "organized by the Vietnam Day Committee (VDC), a collection of students and protesters disenchanted with liberal America and frightened by the South-East Asian conflict, stunned the University authorities and caused concern in Washington."

== May 22, 1965 (Saturday) ==
- The new sport of skateboarding received its first wide recognition as the First Annual National Skateboard Championships were conducted, in Anaheim, California, and videotaped for nationwide broadcast on ABC's Wide World of Sports the following Saturday. The two-day event, which attracted contestants "from as far away as Japan, Mexico, New York, Texas and Washington" featured a downhill and a flatland slalom, trick performances, and a figure-eight skating event, and took place at La Palma Stadium in Anaheim.
- Born: Venus Xtravaganza (stage name for Venus Pellagatti), American transgender performer; in Jersey City, New Jersey (murdered, 1988)
- Died:
  - Frans-Henri van den Dungen, 66, Belgian physicist and co-author, in 1926, with Ernest De Donder, of findings that "the gravitational interaction in general relativity might be described by an integral equation of the Fredholm type (in a generalized space due to the number of degrees of freedom of the system of particles considered), whose solution seemed to imply a periodic phenomenon that exhibited similarity to the undulatory behaviour of microscopic particles in Schrödinger's wave mechanics."
  - Christopher Stone, 72, British broadcaster who, in 1927, became the first disc jockey when he hosted a program for BBC radio for introducing and playing songs on the air.

== May 23, 1965 (Sunday) ==
- In Belgium's parliamentary election, Prime Minister Theo Lefevre's coalition of Christian Socialists and Belgian Socialists lost 39 seats in the 212 seat Chamber of Representatives. Formerly holding 180 seats, the coalition dropped to 141 seats, one fewer than the 142 necessary for a two-thirds majority in the Chamber that would be required for any constitutional changes. Lefebvre presented his resignation to King Baudouin the next day.
- Franz Jonas won a narrow victory in a bitter race for the new president of Austria, defeating former chancellor Alfons Gorbach by a margin of 2,324,474 to 2,260,992. Mayor of Vienna since 1951, Jonas was notable for having dropped out of school to become an apprentice typesetter, and for his fluency in the artificial language of Esperanto. As with his predecessor, Adolf Schärf, Jonas would pass away in his second term.
- The Space Science Board of the National Academy of Sciences recommended to NASA that future astronauts who walked on the Moon should be kept under quarantine for at least three weeks after their return, just in case there were germs present on the lunar surface. The period was picked "because it exceeded the incubation of most terrestrial germs", and as "a compromise between those who thought a quarantine was unnecessary and those who argued for many months". The crew of Apollo 11, lunar astronauts would be kept under a quarantine upon their return and until August 10, 1969.
- Eight members of the crew of the Norwegian tanker MV Heimvard were killed, as 22 injured, when the vessel exploded and burned at Muroran in Japan's Hokkaido Prefecture, after it rammed into a pier. The force of the collision caused a kerosene stove to tip over, causing a fire that spread to the tanker's cargo of oil. Two men from a Japanese tugboat adjacent to the Heimvard were missing after the accident. As the ship burned, other Japanese tugboats pulled the tanker out to sea and prevented the flames from spreading to the 65 oil storage tanks on the coast.
- The Inter-American Peacekeeping Force was deployed in the Dominican Republic to replace the American troops that had been in the country since April 30. The force, sent by the OAS, would reach as many as 8,200 people and begin withdrawing on June 28, 1966, completing its mission by October. During the occupation, the 270 troops already sent by Honduras and Costa Rica would be joined by 1,130 from Brazil, 184 from Paraguay, 160 from Nicaragua, and three staff officers from El Salvador.
- Born:
  - Manolo Sanchís, Spanish soccer football player for Real Madrid and for Spain National Team; in Madrid
  - Melissa McBride, American television and film actress known for The Walking Dead and its sequels; in Lexington, Kentucky
  - Kappei Yamaguchi, Japanese voice actor; in Fukuoka
- Died:
  - David Smith, 59, American abstract sculptor, was killed in an auto accident in Shaftsbury, Vermont, while on his way to attend the opening of an art exhibit at Bennington College.
  - Earl Webb, 67, American baseball player whose record for most doubles in a season — 67 in 1931 — remains a Major League Baseball record.

== May 24, 1965 (Monday) ==
- Subandrio, the foreign minister of Indonesia and chief of its Intelligence Bureau, told a political rally that there was a "Council of Generals" that was plotting to overthrow President Sukarno and the Indonesian government as part of a conspiracy jointly funded by the United States and the United Kingdom. In response to the allegations of the conspiracy, which Subandrio accepted as true without investigation, Subandrio persuaded the government to mobilize "progressive and revolutionary" officers against the fictitious Council.
- The United Kingdom officially adopted the metric system of weights and measures, to be phased in over a ten-year period. Douglas Jay, the president of the Board of Trade, made the announcement to the press, and said that it would aid British companies trading with the rest of Europe.
- Born:
  - Shinichirō Watanabe, Japanese film director, producer, and screenwriter; in Kyoto
  - John C. Reilly, American actor and comedian; in Chicago
- Died:
  - Sonny Boy Williamson II (stage name for Aleck Miller), 52, American blues musician, was found dead from a heart attack at his home in Helena, Arkansas.
  - Hans Jüttner, 71, German former SS leader

== May 25, 1965 (Tuesday) ==
- World heavyweight boxing champion Muhammad Ali and the man whom he had beaten for the title in 1964, former champion Sonny Liston, faced each other in a much-anticipated rematch in Lewiston, Maine. The match, seen by 4,280 in the small Central Maine Youth Center, started at 9:30 p.m. and was shown in theaters on closed-circuit television, and heard on the radio by millions of people. Despite all the hype, the fight was over in only 60 seconds into the first round. Ali struck Liston with what would become known as the "Phantom Punch", which few of the people watching saw on television because of the camera angle; "For many", a reporter would write the next day, "Liston seemed to fall without being hit." As Liston lay on the canvas, the referee, former boxing champion Jersey Joe Walcott, forgot to begin counting, and admitted later, "I did not count out Liston. I was told that he was on the floor 12 seconds. Then I awarded the knockout." Liston got back up, Ali and Liston began fighting again, and Walcott separated the two men and stopped the bout.
- Born: Yahya Jammeh, President of the Gambia from 1994 to 2017; in Kanilai
- Died: Ethel du Pont, 49, American heiress, hanged herself.

== May 26, 1965 (Wednesday) ==
- The United States Senate passed an amended version of the Voting Rights Act of 1965, by a 77–19 margin. Voting against the bill were 17 Democrats and two Republicans, all from the southern United States. An amendment was added in order to get the bill to pass, avoiding a prohibition of the poll tax; as one author would note later "The compromise amendment... stated that Congress was against the use of poll taxes as a condition for voting, but it did not actually ban the use of the taxes."
- After a week of civil warfare arising from a strike of tin miners, the offices of co-presidents of Bolivia were created, with President René Barrientos sharing power equally with General Alfredo Ovando Candía until new civilian presidential elections could be arranged. Barrientos would resign on January 2 to run in the campaign.
- The new SOLAS Convention (International Convention for the Safety of Life at Sea), opened for signing in 1960, entered into force worldwide.

== May 27, 1965 (Thursday) ==
- New Zealand Prime Minister Keith Holyoake announced in Parliament that 120 troops from the 16th Field Regiment, Royal New Zealand Artillery would become the first of that nation's troops to be committed to the Vietnam War. "Nothing will give Australian soldiers more satisfaction than to be in company with troops from New Zealand”, Holyoake told the opening session of Parliament in Wellington.
- Playing on its home field, Inter Milan of Italy defeated S.L. Benfica of Portugal, 1–0, before a crowd of 80,000 fans at the San Siro stadium to win its second consecutive European Cup in soccer football. Because of heavy rains that fell before the game, the field was slippery. The lone goal was made by Jair da Costa.
- The first Australian troops in the Vietnam War departed on HMAS Sydney, with the 1st Battalion, Royal Australian Regiment being in the original group.
- The Konfrontasi between Indonesia and Malaysia continued with the start of the Battle of Sungei Koemba, an ambush launched by the 3rd Battalion, Royal Australian Regiment (3 RAR), along the Sungei Koemba river in Kalimantan, the Indonesian side of the island of Borneo.
- Born: Todd Bridges, American television actor best known for Diff'rent Strokes; in San Francisco
- Died: Antonio Ligabue, 65, Italian Naïve artist

== May 28, 1965 (Friday) ==
- In India, An explosion in a coal mine killed 375 miners in Dhanbad in the Bihar state. The cause was later attributed to an excess of coal dust from blasting an ignition by an electrical spark, which caused a tremendous explosion that killed hundreds of people underground, and more than 100 who were on the surface.
- Japan's House of Councillors voted 121 to 69 to pass the Farmland Reward Bill that had already cleared the House of Representatives, to compensate former landowners who had lost their property in the reforms that followed World War II. Law 121, 1965 would take effect on June 3.
- Born: Mary Coughlan, Irish Fianna Fáil politician who was Tánaiste (deputy prime minister) from 2008 to 2011; in Donegal
- Died: P. R. Stephensen, 63, Australian left-wing and later right-wing political activist, former Communist Party member who co-founded the Fascist Australia First Movement in 1941

== May 29, 1965 (Saturday) ==
- The Samotlor oil field, the sixth largest in the world, was discovered in the Soviet Union when drillers struck oil for the first time there. Located in the Tyumen Oblast in Western Siberia in the Russian SFSR, near the border with the Kazakh SSR, the Samotlor field would become the largest in the USSR, and later in Russia.
- The Captain Cook Bridge across the Georges River in Sydney opened for traffic, with seven spans to make it 1,660 feet (510 m) long.
- Born: Bakhtyar Khudojnazarov, Tajikistan film director (d. 2015); in Dushanbe, Tadzhik SSR, Soviet Union

== May 30, 1965 (Sunday) ==
- In the Battle of Ba Gia, the 1st Regiment of the Viet Cong ambushed the 1st Battalion of the South Vietnamese Army (ARVN)'s 51st Regiment. The defeat was so overwhelming that, even with air support from the United States, the ARVN battalion lost 392 men, along with 446 rifles and 90 crew-served weapons. Although South Vietnam claimed that it killed 556 Viet Cong, the ARVN soldiers captured only 20 weapons.
- A total eclipse of the sun took place, with a path entirely over the sparsely inhabited area of the South Pacific Ocean east of New Zealand and west of South America.
- In Canada, Jewish activists disrupted a Neo-Nazi rally at Allan Gardens.
- Died: Louis Hjelmslev, 65, Danish linguist

== May 31, 1965 (Monday) ==
- Scotland's Jim Clark won the Indianapolis 500 and set a new record for the fastest speed in the race's history, averaging 150.686 m.p.h. and finishing two laps (and five miles) ahead of second place Parnelli Jones. Clark's auto, a Ford Lotus 38-Cosworth was the first rear-engine design car to win at Indianapolis. Minutes after Clark's win, Jones ran out of gas in the final lap and had to push his car across the finish line.
- The Brunei Malay Regiment became the Royal Brunei Armed Forces.
- Born:
  - Brooke Shields, American film and television actress; in New York City
  - DJ Casper (stage name for William Perry Jr.), American disc jockey (d. 2023); in Chicago, Illinois
