= June 1965 =

Month of 1965

<<	June 1965					>>
Su	Mo	Tu	We	Th	Fr	Sa
		1	2	3	4	5
6	7	8	9	10	11	12
13	14	15	16	17	18	19
20	21	22	23	24	25	26
27	28	29	30

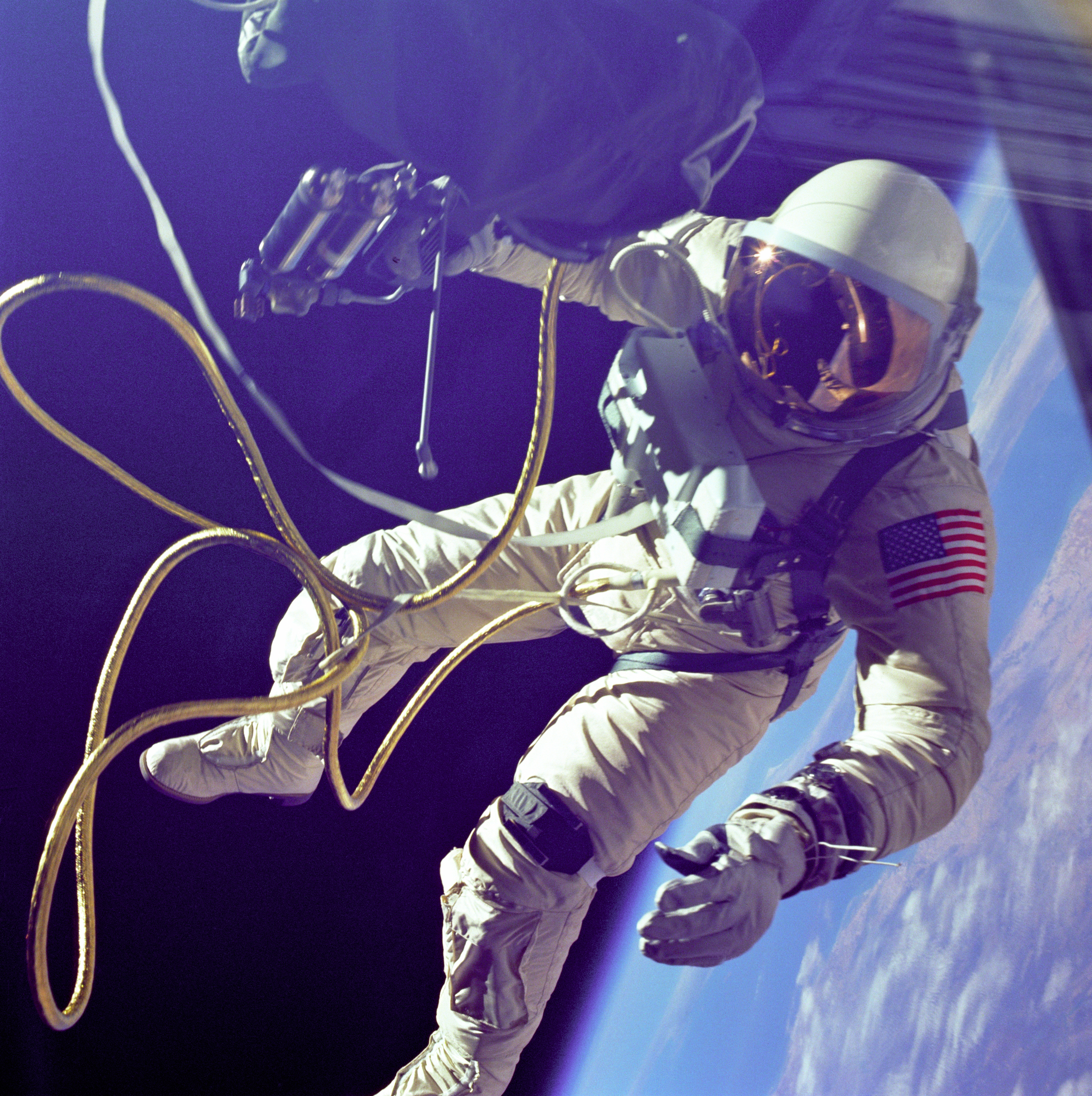
June 3, 1965: Ed White performs first "space walk" by an American astronaut

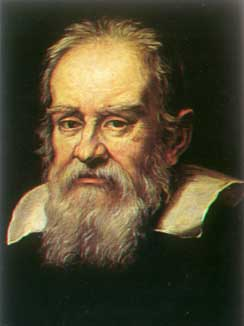
June 10, 1965: Galileo is praised by Pope Paul VI, 332 years after inquisition

The following events occurred in June 1965:

== June 1, 1965 (Tuesday) ==
- An explosion at the coal mine in Fukuoka, Japan, killed 237 people. Another 280 miners were able to get out uninjured, while 36 were brought alive to the surface.
- Marina Oswald, the widow of accused presidential assassin Lee Harvey Oswald, remarried a little more than 18 months after her husband's slaying. Eluding reporters who had learned of their engagement, she and an electronics worker, Kenneth Porter, got a license in the Dallas suburb of Sherman, Texas, drove to Durant, Oklahoma, to get a blood test, then were wed by a justice of the peace in Fate, Texas.
- The Molten-Salt Reactor Experiment (MSRE) reactor in Oak Ridge, Tennessee, first achieved criticality, with its uranium-235 fuel able to sustain a chain reaction on its own, marking the first time that the inherently safer MSR was proved to be practical. It would reach full power by May 23, 1966. It would continue to operate until March 26, 1968.
- Elliott Roosevelt, the son of former President Franklin Delano Roosevelt, won his first, and only, political office, defeating incumbent Melvin J. Richard for the office of Mayor of Miami Beach, Florida.
- Florida International University was founded in Miami.
- Born:
  - Larisa Lazutina, Russian cross-country skier, Olympic gold medalist in 1992, 1994, and 1998, and gold medalist in six world championships between 1987 and 2001; in Kondopoga, Karelian ASSR, Soviet Union
  - Nigel Short, British chess grandmaster who lost to Garry Kasparov in the 1993 World Chess Championship; in Leigh
- Died: Earl "Curly" Lambeau, 67, American pro football player, coach and co-founder of the Green Bay Packers

== June 2, 1965 (Wednesday) ==
- The first contingent of Australian combat troops to fight in the Vietnam War arrived in South Vietnam.
- Deputy Sheriffs Oneal Moore and Creed Rogers, the first African-American deputies with the Washington Parish, Louisiana Sheriff's Office, were shot by the occupant of the bed of a pickup truck that pulled up alongside their patrol car. Moore was killed and Rogers was blinded in one eye. The FBI would continue investigating the shooting, believed to be racially motivated, into the 21st century, although the prime suspect, Ernest Ray McElveen, would die in 2003.
- A two-day-long series of storms, with winds as high as 100 miles per hour (160 km/h), dissipated after devastating the Barisal Division of East Pakistan (now Bangladesh). According to the investigation performed by the Pakistani government, the death toll from the second cyclone in less than a month was 12,047 after storm surges swept across the settlements near sea level.
- Born: Steve Waugh and Mark Waugh, Australian cricketers; in Campsie, New South Wales

== June 3, 1965 (Thursday) ==
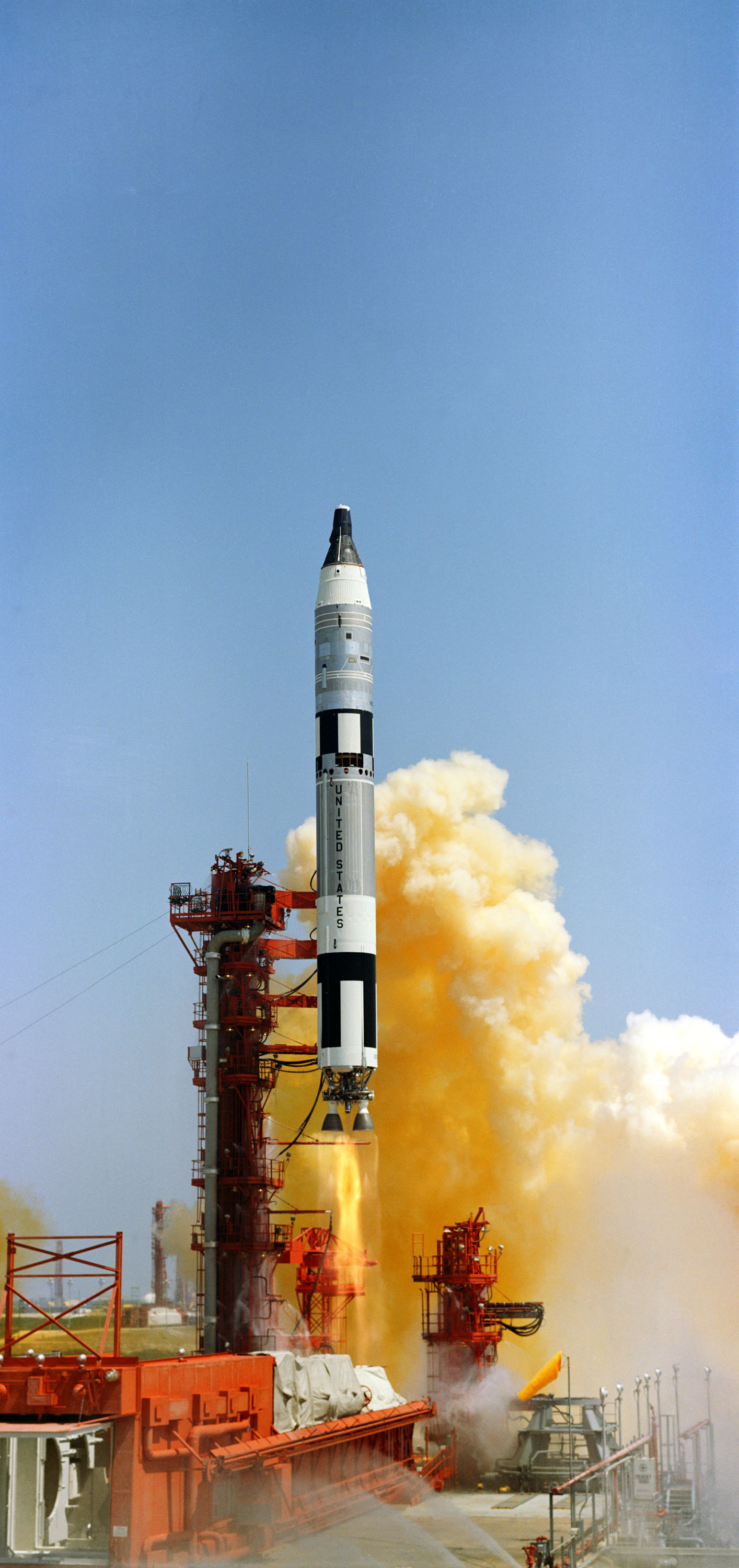
June 3, 1965: Launch of Gemini 4

- Gemini 4, the second crewed and first long-duration mission in the Gemini program, was launched from complex 19 at Cape Kennedy at 11:16 a.m. Command pilot Astronaut James A. McDivitt and pilot Astronaut Edward H. White II were the crew. At 3:45 p.m., when the craft was making its third orbit and passing at an altitude of 135 miles (217 km) above the southern United States, White, using a hand-held maneuvering gun, became the first U.S. astronaut (and only the second person, after Soviet cosmonaut Alexei Leonov had ventured outside Voskhod 2 on March 18) to walk in space. White stayed outside the capsule for 20 minutes as the ship moved at 17,500 miles per hour (28,200 km/h) over the nation. Gemini 4 was the first mission to be controlled from the mission control center in Houston.
- In Japan, the Farmland Reward Bill took effect as 1965 Law 121, to compensate former landowners who had lost their property in the land reforms that had followed World War II. The bill authorized a fund of ¥145.6 billion Japanese yen ($400,000,000 US dollars) for payments over a ten-year period to 1,670,000 people who had owned land prior to 1945, or to their heirs.

== June 4, 1965 (Friday) ==
- Duane Earl Pope, a 22-year-old man who had graduated from McPherson College only a week earlier, committed what was called "the modern era's bloodiest bank robbery", murdering three people and critically wounding another. Pope, a resident of Salina, Kansas, drove to Big Springs, Nebraska, and walked into the Farmers State Bank at noon. There were no customers in the bank, but one of the four employees, a teller, pressed the button for the bank alarm. Pope then ordered the bank president, the teller, a bookkeeper, and another employee to lie face down on the floor, then shot all four in the back before escaping with $1,500. After a nationwide search that lasted a week, Pope called police in Kansas City, Missouri, and surrendered because he was "tired of running".
- London Records released The Rolling Stones single "(I Can't Get No) Satisfaction" to the U.S. for the first time, it would be followed by a UK release on August 20 by Decca Records. The single become an instant hit in both countries and is the band's best-selling song.
- Born: Mick Doohan, Australian motorcycle racer and five time 500cc World Champion; in Gold Coast, Queensland

== June 5, 1965 (Saturday) ==
- The Italian tanker SS Luisa exploded and caught fire at Bandar-e Mahshahr, Iran, killing 30 of her 41 crew, and two others onshore.
- The first report of the discovery of a human coronavirus was published in the British Medical Journal by Dr. David A. Tyrell and Dr. Malcolm L. Bynoe, who had made microscopic study of a specimen collected on February 17, 1961, of a highly infectious respiratory virus which they labeled the B814 strain of the common cold virus. In their article, "Cultivation of a Novel Type of Common-cold Virus in Organ Cultures", they wrote "we now believe that the B814 strain is a virus virtually unrelated to any other known virus of the human respiratory tract, although, since it is ether-labile, it may be a myxovirus."
- Joseph Francis Shea, NASA's manager of the Apollo program, told reporters that the ongoing Gemini 4 mission had resolved five important issues for a crewed mission to the Moon, and that "If everything goes as well as the Gemini-4 shot today, then we can get everything done for the Moon shot by mid-1968", at least one and a half years ahead of the projected 1970 date.
- The U.S. Navy aircraft carrier presence in the Gulf of Tonkin off Vietnam reached five ships with the full-time staffing of Dixie Station off South Vietnam by one aircraft carrier.
- Born: Sandrine Piau, French operatic soprano; in Issy-les-Moulineaux, Hauts-de-Seine département
- Died:
  - Thornton W. Burgess, 91, American children's book author who wrote 70 books and 15,000 short stories in his career
  - Prince Wilhelm, Duke of Södermanland, 81, author and second son of King Gustav V of Sweden
  - Eleanor Farjeon, 84, English children's author and poet who wrote the hymn "Morning Has Broken"

== June 6, 1965 (Sunday) ==
- A centuries-old tradition, of no business on Sundays on the Isle of Skye, came to an end as British Rail began operating its ferry from mainland Scotland seven days a week. A group from Kyleakin's Free Church of Scotland, commonly called the "Wee Frees", organized a campaign of non-violent resistance. When the first car drove off of the ferry, the Reverend Angus Smith sat down in the road to block traffic. After he was arrested, 11 other members of his congregation stepped forward, one by one, to block traffic and get arrested. The last person to block the road was Alan MacDonald, a 6.5 feet (2.0 m), 280 pounds (130 kg) farmer, and after six policemen were unable to move him, reinforcements came in and hauled him to jail. Afterward, Chuck Sheldon, an American tourist visiting from Denver, became the first Sabbath day visitor to Skye.
- Born: Cam Neely, Canadian ice hockey player and inductee of Hockey Hall of Fame; in Comox, British Columbia

== June 7, 1965 (Monday) ==
- Chemist Norman H. Stingley filed the original patent application for the Wham-O Super Ball, made of a polybutadiene compound which he called "Zectron". The toy was capable of bouncing three times as high as other elastic and rubber balls. The rights had been sold to the Wham-O Toy Company, which would begin selling the toys as early as July 29. U.S. Patent No. 3,241,834 would be granted on March 22, 1966.
- A methane gas explosion in the Yugoslav city of Kakanj, Bosnia and Herzegovina, killed 128 coal miners.

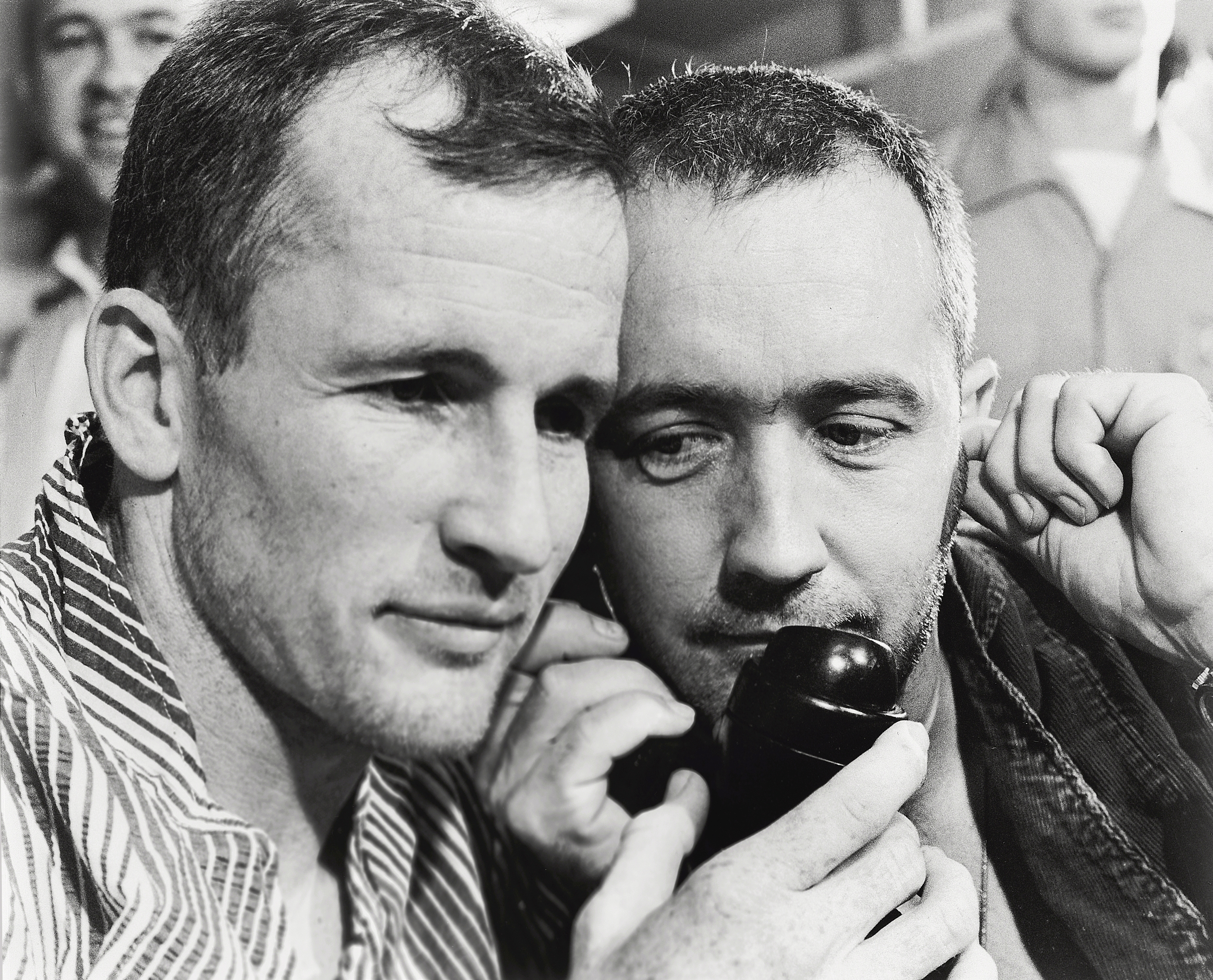
June 7, 1965: Astronauts White (left) and McDivitt speak with President Johnson after their return to Earth

- Gemini 4 made a safe return to Earth at 1:13 p.m., after completing 62 orbits and four days in outer space. The crew decided to handle reentry manually because of problems with the on-board computer, and fired a reentry rocket one second too soon, causing the capsule to land short of the target area in the Atlantic Ocean, 40 miles (64 km) from the prime recovery ship, the aircraft carrier USS Wasp.
- Born:
  - Mick Foley, American professional wrestler; in Bloomington, Indiana
  - Damien Hirst, English artist; in Bristol
- Died: Judy Holliday, 43, American stage and film actress; from breast cancer

== June 8, 1965 (Tuesday) ==
- A U.S. State Department spokesman, Robert J. McCloskey told a press conference "more or less offhandedly", that General William C. Westmoreland had been given presidential authorization to commit American ground troops to combat in support of South Vietnamese army missions. McCloskey specifically said that "I'm sure it's been made clear... that American forces would be available for combat support together with Vietnamese forces as and when necessary." The White House issued a carefully worded denial the next day, but American troops would be used in offensive combat later in the summer.
- Physicists at Johns Hopkins University reported that the mythical "four corners of the Earth" actually existed, in the form of giant bulges on the Earth's surface, confirmed by satellite radar measurements of the pull of gravity. The locations of the four sites where the pull of gravity was 0.002% greater than expected were in an area centered on Ireland; one centered in the Pacific Ocean between New Guinea and Japan; an area between Africa and Antarctica; and a fourth corner off the coast of Peru.
- The very first Major League Baseball draft was held at an owners' meeting in the Hotel Commodore in New York City. The Kansas City Athletics, who had finished the 1964 season with a 57–105 record and last place in the American League, got the first pick and selected outfielder Rick Monday of Arizona State University.

== June 9, 1965 (Wednesday) ==
- The Soviet lunar probe Luna 6 failed after the control to its engine jammed after ground control transmitted a signal for a mid-course correction to guide it to a planned landing on the Moon. Rather than shutting off, the rockets continued to burn and "by accidentally expending all of its fuel, Luna 6 literally leaped off course like a jack rabbit and missed the moon" by 160,935 kilometres (100,000 mi).
- The Dhofar Rebellion which would go from a state of unrest to a civil war against the oil-rich Sultanate of Muscat and Oman began as the Dhofar Liberation Front attacked a set of trucks belonging to an oil company, ramping up general unrest that had existed since 1962. The Sultan dispatched the national army to permanently occupy the Dhofar Province.
- About 1,500 Viet Cong guerrillas mounted a mortar attack on the village of Đồng Xoài, overrunning its military headquarters and the adjoining militia compound.
- Muhammad Ahmad Mahgoub was elected Prime Minister of the Sudan by the Sudanese parliament.

== June 10, 1965 (Thursday) ==
- The Finance Ministers of Tanzania, Uganda and Kenya announced that they were giving up the East African shilling, the common monetary unit that had been established by the East African Currency Board nearly 50 years earlier, in favor of issuing their own currency. These would be replaced in the three nations by the Tanzanian shilling, the Ugandan shilling and the Kenyan shilling, issued by the national banks set up by the three nations to replace the ECAB.
- Pope Paul VI praised astronomer Galileo Galilei during a visit to Pisa, almost 350 years after Pope Paul V had ordered an inquisition that rejected Galileo's idea that the Earth moves around the Sun. Although Galileo was not rehabilitated from charges of heresy (which still had not happened as of 2017), the Pontiff's praise of the "great mind" of Galileo was the first from the Roman Catholic Church since Galileo's death in 1642.
- British European Airways Flight 343 became the first civilian jetliner to make an almost completely automatic landing. Technically, the landing was auto-flare, because the pilot continued to control the yaw and the roll of the Trident 1C jet, while a computer guided the pitch during the descent to London's Heathrow Airport.
- Ismail al-Azhari, a member of the Presidential Council that had guided Sudan since the overthrow of President Ibrahim Abboud on November 15, 1964, was named as the President of Sudan upon his election to Chairman of the Council. Abboud would rule until his overthrow by General Gaafar Nimeiry on May 25, 1969.
- Born:
  - Elizabeth Hurley, English actress and model; in Basingstoke, Hampshire
  - Veronica Ferres, German actress; in Solingen, West Germany

== June 11, 1965 (Friday) ==
- The government of Prime Minister Suat Hayri Ürgüplü of Turkey promulgated Law Number 633 to establish the Presidency of Religious Affairs, an agency of the Diyanet, which regulated religious practice in Turkey. Under the new law, anyone wishing to be employed full-time as a Muslim clergyman had to be a graduate of one of the state-operated İmam Hatip schools. Previously, an applicant only had to pass an examination given by the Diyanet.
- U.S. President Johnson declared that the promotion of learning the English language should be a major policy in American foreign aid, and directed the Peace Corps, the United States Agency for International Development, and other organizations to encourage such study, in what was viewed as elevating "the status of English as an international language."
- A flash flood drowned 24 people in the small town of Sanderson, Texas, as a 15-foot high wall of water poured through the town, built inside a canyon. At 7:05 in the morning, the wave from Sanderson Creek and Three Mile Draw swept through the town at about 10 miles an hour (14.7 feet per second) and peaked within 15 minutes.
- Allen Ginsberg, William S. Burroughs, Lawrence Ferlinghetti, Harry Fainlight, Gregory Corso, and Andrei Voznesensky were among the readers at the International Poetry Incarnation (billed as "Poets of the World, Poets of Our Time"), a one-off event held in the Royal Albert Hall, London, in front of 7,000 people.
- A gang of robbers in Canada seized five gold bars worth $164,000 in a raid on a railroad station in Virginiatown, Ontario.
- Born: Manuel Uribe, Mexican electronics repairman who attained fame as The World's Heaviest Man on television, and attained a weight of 1,316 pounds at his peak (d. 2014); in Monterrey, Nuevo León, Mexico
- Died:
  - Vernon Johns, 73, American civil rights leader and predecessor of Martin Luther King Jr., as pastor of the Dexter Avenue Baptist Church in Montgomery, Alabama
  - USAF Major Alexander Kratz Rupp, 34, one of the 34 finalists for NASA Astronaut Group 3, was killed in the explosion of an F-102A jet interceptor during a test flight at Wright-Patterson Air Force Base in Ohio. Investigation showed that the left wing had been reused from another aircraft, and that material failure caused the recycled wing to break off.

== June 12, 1965 (Saturday) ==
- The Beatles were appointed Members of the British Empire (MBE) in the Queen's Birthday Honours. The honour was among the 1,800 nominations made by Prime Minister Harold Wilson. Since it was unusual for popular musicians to be appointed as MBEs, a number of previous recipients complained and protested: MP Hector Dupuis commented, "British royalty has put me on the same level as a bunch of vulgar numbskulls". In the list of thousands of honorees, they were listed as "John W. Lennon", "James P. McCartney", George Harrison, and "Richard Starkey". A columnist for the Daily Mail wrote that the award "sets the state's most formal stamp of approval on the mindless ephemeral rubbish which the Beatles' music is."
- In the Soviet Union, six members of the "Kolokol Group" were arrested in the Soviet Union for their criticism of the Communist government and their unauthorized publications. Most were alumni of the Leningrad Technological Institute. The leaders, Valery Ronkin and Sergei Khakhaev would be sentenced to seven years of corrective labor and a three-year exile, while Vladimir Gaenko, Valery Smolkin, Sergei Moshkov and Veniamin Iofe would receive three-year sentences. All would be sent to the Dubravlag Labor Camp in the Mordovian Autonomous Soviet Socialist Republic.
- South Vietnam's President Phan Khắc Sửu and Prime Minister Phan Huy Quát announced their resignations, less than eight months after they had formed a civilian government that worked within the oversight of the military leaders. Major General Nguyễn Văn Thiệu was named as the President, chairing the "Supreme Military Council", and Vice Air Marshal Nguyễn Cao Kỳ became prime minister.
- An Australian patrol ambushed an Indonesian force on the Sungei Koemba river in Kalimantan (Indonesian Borneo). At the end of the 20-minute action, the Australians had suffered no casualties, while eight Indonesians had been killed and one seriously wounded.

== June 13, 1965 (Sunday) ==
- On the final day that the Berlin Wall was open to visitors traveling from West Berlin to East Berlin, 70,000 people came over from West Germany to see their relatives. For two weeks, under an agreement between East Germany and West Germany on September 24, 1964, West Berliners were allowed travel passes to come through five checkpoints at the wall, but the agreement expired at midnight. During the pass period, 600,000 people obtained passes. "The wall technically closed at midnight", a UPI reporter noted, "but actually guards kept crossing points open for stragglers."
- American airplanes bombed and strafed a leprosarium (hospital for persons with leprosy) at Quỳnh Lập in Hoàng Mai, North Vietnam. Over the next eight days, the buildings were destroyed and 140 patients were killed.
- Huge crowds turned out at Drumcliffe Churchyard, County Sligo, Ireland, to celebrate the centenary of the birth of poet W. B. Yeats.
- The 1965 Belgian Grand Prix was held at Spa-Francorchamps and was won by Jim Clark.
- Died: Martin Buber, 87, Austrian-born Israeli Jewish philosopher

== June 14, 1965 (Monday) ==
- For the first time, a facsimile machine (fax) was used to transmit an electrocardiogram from a heart patient to a treating physician, in a test planned jointly by physicians and communications experts in both France and the United States. A passenger on the ocean liner SS France was in the Atlantic Ocean, and the image of the EKG was sent to the Boucicaut Hospital in Paris, by way of Cornell University Hospital, RCA Communications, the Intelsat satellite, and D'Liaisons Radiotelephotographiques de France, and proved to be of sufficient diagnostic quality to lead to further use of the technique.
- "Yesterday", which would go on to become the most covered song in history, with renditions by over 3,000 recording artists in its first forty years, was recorded for the first time. Paul McCartney would say later that he had literally dreamed up the melody in late 1964, reconstructed it on the piano after waking up, but avoided composing lyrics for it because he was certain that it was a subconscious memory of someone else's work. When it became clear that it was unfamiliar to any of the experts that he played it for, he perfected it as an addition to the soundtrack for the Beatles' film Help!.
- The 24-hour clock was introduced in all British Rail timetables.
- Died: H. V. Kaltenborn, 86, American political commentator and radio journalist for NBC

== June 15, 1965 (Tuesday) ==
- East German border guards shot and killed Hermann Döbler of West Germany, and critically wounded his girlfriend Elke Märtens, after their motorboat strayed across the Teltow Canal that flowed between West Berlin and the East German city of Potsdam. The commander who gave the order would write that after crossing into West German waters, Döbler and Märtens had "provoked" the two guards in the tower and that one of the guards "decided to use his weapon to annihilate the border violators". Döbler was hit four times and was dead when the boat reached the opposite shore. After the reunification of Germany, the three guards were put on trial, in 1993, 28 years after the shooting, and the guard who fired the fatal shots would be convicted of premeditated murder and "sentenced to six years in prison, one of the harshest punishments ever handed down to a border guard."
- Lady Clementine Churchill, the widow of Sir Winston Churchill, became a member of the British Parliament for the first time, at the age of 80, when she took a seat in the House of Lords as Baroness Spencer-Churchill of Chartwell. While her husband, the former Prime Minister of the United Kingdom, had served strictly in the House of Commons, he had turned down offers to be made a member of the nobility. After his death, Queen Elizabeth II asked Lady Churchill to accept a peerage and conferred the title of Baroness upon her.
- United States Air Force Lt. Colonel Charles D. Tubbs was killed and two other crewmen injured when their B-58 Hustler bomber crashed at the Paris Air Show. The plane landed short of the runway, striking the "instrument approach beacons", and burst into flames in front of thousands of spectators at Le Bourget air field. Ninety minutes earlier, the Soviet Union unveiled its new transport airplane, the turboprop Antonov An-22, which they named Antaeus, which remains the largest turboprop airplane ever built.
- The collision of two U.S. Army Bell UH-1B "Huey" helicopters over Fort Benning in Georgia killed everyone on board both aircraft, with 18 servicemen dying when the vehicles crashed and burst into flames on impact. The two helicopters were ferrying members of the 38th U.S. Infantry on a training exercise and were at low altitude when their rotors struck each other while flying in close formation.
- The Law Commissions Act 1965 took effect in the United Kingdom, creating two independent bodies to review laws and recommend reforms. Two commissions of five members each were created, the Law Commission (England and Wales) and the Scottish Law Commission.
- In the United Kingdom, the Hughes-Parry Committee submitted its report on the legal status of the Welsh language.
- Born: Adam Smith, American politician, U.S. representative for Washington's 9th congressional district since 1997 and chair of the House Armed Services Committee; in Washington, D.C.
- Died:
  - Steve Cochran, 48, American B-movie, television, and stage actor, died of a lung infection while sailing his yacht off the coast of Guatemala. The three women with him did not know how to operate the boat, which had no radio, and remained on board for 11 days until it drifted ashore at Champerico.
  - E. A. Speiser, 63, Polish-American archaeologist and specialist in the history of Assyria, who rediscovered the ancient site of Tepe Gawra in 1927.
  - Carlton B. Ardery Jr., 41, American test pilot was killed in the crash of a Republic F-105 Thunderchief

== June 16, 1965 (Wednesday) ==
- U.S. Secretary of Defense Robert S. McNamara announced in Washington that 22,000 additional American troops were being sent to South Vietnam, while conceding that the war was going unfavorably for the United States. The additional deployment would raise the number of U.S. soldiers and officers in South Vietnam to 72,000.
- The U.S. Senate voted, 72 to 5, to approve the Federal Cigarette Labeling and Advertising Act, which would require the warning label on all packs of cigarettes, with the statement "Caution: Cigarette smoking may be hazardous to your health".
- A planned anti-war protest at the Pentagon became a teach-in, with demonstrators distributing 50,000 leaflets in and around the building.
- Gemini astronaut James McDivitt, who was touring the nation following his successful space mission, became the first and only celebrity to be awarded a "gold windshield wiper" for his service to the nation. The gift, presented in Jackson, Michigan, where he was in a parade before 150,000 people, was based on a joking remark that he made while Edward White was on his spacewalk, when he accused White of smearing the window of the Gemini capsule.
- The U.S. House of Representatives voted 217–104 to create a cabinet level U.S. Department of Housing and Urban Development (HUD).
- Died: Henry J. Hemingway, 60, former President of the American-Marietta Corporation before its 1961 merger to create Martin Marietta, accidentally fell 47 floors to his death while leaning against his office window in Chicago. Hemingway, "who often relaxed by watching the demolition of the old Morrison Hotel.... apparently leaned against a cracked window vent, which gave way" and lost his footing on the waxed floor of his office."

== June 17, 1965 (Thursday) ==
- Commander Louis C. Page and Lieutenant John C. Smith, of the USS Midway and the VF-21 Freelancers fighter squadron, became the first U.S. Navy pilots to down an enemy plane in the Vietnam War, when they shot down a North Vietnamese MiG-17 while flying in an F-4B Phantom. In all, the U.S. downed four MiG planes that day.
- The 1965 Commonwealth Prime Ministers' Conference opened in London, hosted by British Prime Minister Harold Wilson, who invited the premiers of 20 other nations within the British Commonwealth to 10 Downing Street.
- Born:
  - Dan Jansen, American speed-skater who held the world's record for the fastest 500-meter race, and won the 1994 Olympic gold medal in breaking the 1000 meter world record, then retired; in West Allis, Milwaukee County, Wisconsin
  - Arabian Prince (stage name for Kim Nazel), American rapper, record producer, and founding member of the gangsta rap group N.W.A.; in Compton, California
  - José Herrera, Uruguay national soccer football team defender with 57 caps from 1988 to 1997; in Tala
  - Dara O'Kearney, Irish ultramarathon runner and professional poker player; in Ennis

== June 18, 1965 (Friday) ==
- The last of the "Garabandal apparitions" was witnessed in the rural village of San Sebastián de Garabandal in Spain, bringing an end to a reported series of messages that had started exactly four years earlier, on June 18, 1961. Conchita González, a 16-year-old girl, said that she had been provided a message from the archangel Saint Michael, who passed along a warning from the Virgin Mary in the form of prophecies that could be avoided if believers asked "forgiveness with sincere hearts". According to Conchita, she was told that "As my message of October 18, 1961, has not been complied with and has not been made known to the world, I am advising you that this is the last one. Before, the cup was filling up. Now it is flowing over. Many cardinals, many bishops, and many priests are on the road to perdition and are taking many souls with them."
- At a rodeo in Gladewater, Texas, 24 spectators were wounded when a rodeo clown fired into the stands as part of the entertainment. The shotgun that he used had inadvertently been loaded with birdshot rather than the usual blank cartridge shells. Eleven of the 24 were hospitalized, including three with eye injuries, but none were critically injured. On July 14, a grand jury would decline to indict the gunman, a 41-year-old Baptist minister who supplemented his income with the clown act, concluding that "there was no evidence of guilt" and that the mix-up was an unfortunate accident.
- Operation Arc Light began as 27 B-52 Stratofortress heavy bombers took off from Andersen Air Force Base on the island of Guam to begin regular bombing of North Vietnamese and Viet Cong strongholds. The distance traveled in each direction was 4,000 kilometers or a little less than 2,500 miles, as the planes flew their missions, then returned to base. By the end of 1965, 1,500 missions would be flown, with 20,000 overall during the war.
- The most powerful rocket in history, the U.S. Air Force's Titan IIIC, made its debut and set a new record by lifting a 21,000-pound (9,500 kg) payload into orbit around the Earth. "[P]roving its ability to establish trailer-size military bases in space", the 127-foot (39 m) tall, 30-foot (9.1 m) wide rocket was praised for "advancing America's military capability."
- Boxer Nino Benvenuti of Italy, who already had a professional boxing record of 65 wins and 0 losses (after an amateur tally of 119–1) became the new world light middleweight champion when he knocked out Sandro Mazzinghi in the sixth round of a bout in Milan.
- Langley Research Center (LaRC) awarded Douglas Aircraft Company a follow-on study contract for the Manned Orbital Research Laboratory (MORL), emphasizing use of the Apollo Extension System (AES) program as a prerequisite to the MORL.
- The original scheduled launch date of the "station that never was", WDV-11 in Warrnambool, Victoria, Australia, came and went. The city government had decreed in November 1963 that television could never be introduced in Warrnambool.

== June 19, 1965 (Saturday) ==
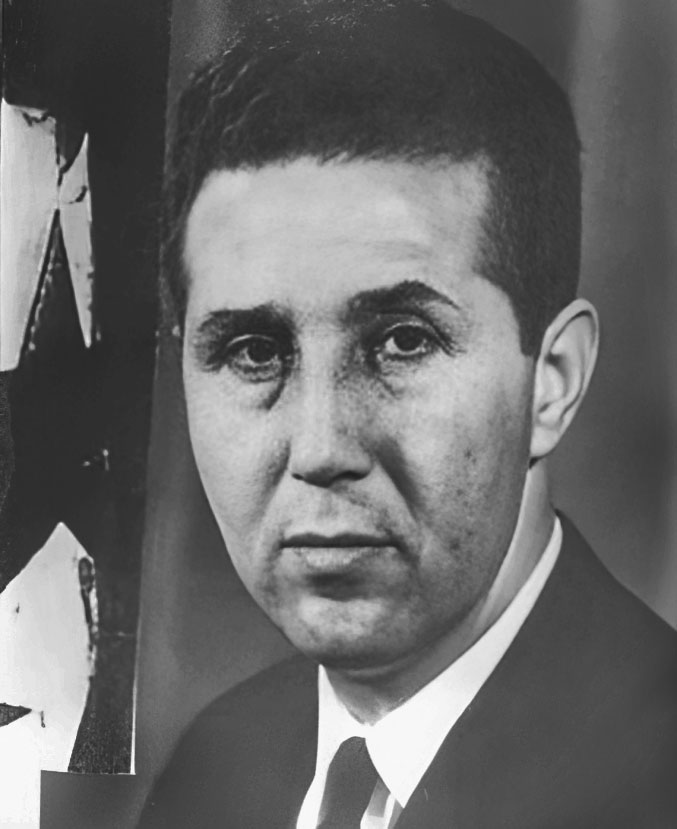
Ben Bella

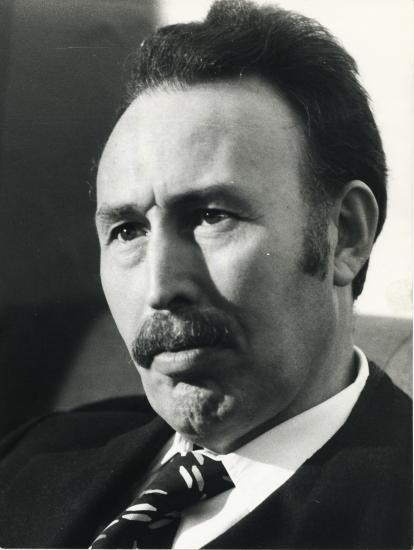
Boumédiène

- President Ahmed Ben Bella of Algeria was overthrown in a bloodless coup led by his Minister of Defense, Colonel Houari Boumédiène . The move came ten days before Ben Bella was scheduled to host a summit conference of 50 non-aligned African and Asian nations in Algiers. Ben Bella had already fired the men who had served as prime minister, Minister of the Interior, Minister of Finance, and Minister of Information and assumed those offices for himself. Boumédienne had gotten word that he would be replaced prior to the summit conference; Ben Bella would be kept under house arrest in "a small prison apartment" in Algiers for the next 14 years, and allowed to go into exile in Switzerland in 1980 after Boumédienne's death. In 1990, Ben Bella would be allowed to return to Algeria, where he would live until his death on April 11, 2012.
- Astronomers Gordon H. Pettengill and Rolf B. Dyce published their paper, "A Radar Determination of the Rotation of the Planet Mercury", in the British scientific journal Nature, disproving the belief that the rotation of the planet Mercury was 87.96 days and equal to its revolution around the sun. Using radar observations at various points of the planet's surface, the two scientists concluded that the planet's rotation was roughly 59 days (later refined to 59.65 days), so that its "day" was roughly two-thirds as long as its "year", rather than being exactly the same.
- Following the 44th annual Laconia Motorcycle Race, an estimated 2,000 fans rioted in the resort town of Laconia, New Hampshire, throwing rocks and setting fire to buildings, after members of the Hell's Angels began fighting with opposing motorcycle gangs. A group of 600 state troopers, policemen, and members of the New Hampshire National Guard converged on the scene after having been called up in anticipation of trouble, and 80 people were injured. One hundred people were arrested.
- Air Marshal Nguyễn Cao Kỳ, head of the South Vietnamese Air Force, was appointed prime minister by a special joint meeting of military leaders following the voluntary resignation of civilian president Phan Khắc Sửu and Prime Minister Phan Huy Quát, who had been installed by the military. South Vietnam's system of government shifted to that of a strong prime minister, with General Nguyễn Văn Thiệu becoming a figurehead president, ending two years of short-lived military juntas.
- An Italian Fiat G.91 jet crashed into the Le Bourget Airport parking lot during the Paris Air Show, killing at least 10 people who were preparing to depart early. The jet reportedly stalled as it was approaching a landing strip after performing stunts, then spun down into the parking lot, bouncing six times as it rolled over automobiles and their occupants. The pilot safely ejected from the plane, but fell onto a parked truck and died.
- Sandown Racecourse, in Melbourne, Australia, was opened before 50,000 spectators as the first major horse racing track to be built since Australia had become independent in 1901. The Victoria Amateur Turf Club billed the opening card of races as "the century's most historic race meeting". A horse named Amphion won the first race on opening day, the Port Phillip Hurdle.

== June 20, 1965 (Sunday) ==
- Two young underwater divers, 19-year-old Paul Giancontieri and 20-year-old David Rose, disappeared after plunging into the 200-foot (61 m) deep Devils Hole, a geothermal pool in Nye County, Nevada. Accompanied by two other adventurers, the two men went into the 90 °F (32 °C) hot waters to explore an underwater cavern that led to a subterranean river. When Giacontieri did not return, Rose went to his rescue and vanished as well. The only trace ever found by rescuers was a flashlight that had been strapped at the main shaft of the cavern opening. The search would be abandoned on June 30, and their bodies would never be recovered.
- Police in Algiers broke up demonstrations by people who had taken to the streets chanting slogans in support of deposed President Ben Bella.
- The North American Racing Team (NART), consisting of Masten Gregory, Ed Hugus, and Jochen Rindt, won the 1965 24 Hours of Le Mans.
- Died:
  - Bernard Baruch, 94, American financier and adviser to eight U.S. Presidents
  - Ira Louvin, 41, American country music singer, was killed when the car in which he was riding collided with another automobile near Williamsburg, Missouri. The UPI news agency noted that Louvin was "the seventh hillbilly musician to die in accidents in the last three years," and that "All seven had been artists in the tragedy-plagued Grand Ole Opry troupe

== June 21, 1965 (Monday) ==
- U.S. President Johnson signed a bill substantially lowering federal excise taxes on the manufacturers of many popular consumer products, including cars and trucks, televisions and radios, refrigerators and freezers, air conditioners, cameras, film, sporting goods, musical instruments, pens, playing cards, and matches for 1965. Tax cuts on air conditioners and automobiles were made retroactive to May 15. Rebates were sent by Ford, Chrysler, General Motors and AMC to customers who had bought vehicles in the previous 37 days, as the tax on autos was decreased from 10% to 7% (and to only 1% by the end of 1968). Further excise tax cuts would be made on January 1, 1966; the tax on telephones would be phased out entirely by January 1, 1969.
- The Premier of Tasmania, Eric Reece, announced that the Gordon Power scheme would "result in some modification to the Lake Pedder National Park"; no further details were revealed.
- Born:
  - Lana Wachowski (formerly known as Larry Wachowski), American transgender film and television director, writer, and producer known for creating The Matrix franchise with her sister Lilly Wachowski; in Chicago
  - Yang Liwei, Chinese scientist who, in 2003, was launched into orbit on China's first space traveler, a "taikonaut", on Shenzhou 5; in Suizhong, Liaoning province
  - Sonique (stage name for Sonia Marina Clarke), British singer and musician; in Crouch End, London

== June 22, 1965 (Tuesday) ==
Japan

South Korea

- The Treaty on Basic Relations between Japan and the Republic of Korea was signed in Tokyo, almost twenty years after South Korea's liberation from being ruled by the Japanese Empire. Among the provisions in the treaty was the clause that "all the treaties or agreements concluded between the Empire of Japan and the Empire of Korea on or before August 22, 1910 are already null and void". Besides establishing formal diplomatic and commercial relations between Japan and South Korea, it also included an "expression of apology" from Japan for its treatment of the Korean people, which "was met with widespread hostile reaction in both countries", as either not enough remorse, or too much. The treaty would enter into force on December 18, 1965.
- Shipwreck divers lifted the first treasure from one of Spain's galleon ships that had been part of the "1715 Treasure Fleet", almost 250 years after the ships had gone down in a hurricane on July 31, 1715. Located 1,000 feet (300 m) off the Florida coast, near the Sebastian Inlet and Vero Beach, Florida, the sunken ship carried a large cargo of silver and was rediscovered in an expedition by the Real 8 Corporation. On July 2, reporters would be shown 3,000 pounds of silver disks, ingots, and pieces of eight, as well as some ingots of gold. The ship had sunk in 25-foot (7.6 m) deep water but was 4 feet (1.2 m) beneath the ocean floor when it was discovered.
- Died:
  - George York and James Latham, aged 22 and 23 respectively, were hanged at the Lansing Correctional Facility in Lansing, Kansas. During a two-week period in 1961, the two men, who had both been privates in the U.S. Army, murdered seven people in a killing spree that took them from Florida to Colorado. When they were sentenced to death in Kansas for the murder of Otto Ziegler, one of them told the court "We killed together, so we expect to die together." Their executions were the last in the state of Kansas, which no longer has capital punishment. York's last statement was "I've nothing to say except I'm going to be going home to heaven, and I hope to meet you people up there. I know it won't do much good to say I'm sorry, but I know God has forgiven me and I hope you people can see fit to do the same."
  - David O. Selznick, 63, American film producer and winner of Academy Awards for Gone With the Wind and Rebecca

== June 23, 1965 (Wednesday) ==
- In Butler County, Pennsylvania, four golfers were killed and six injured after a bolt of lightning struck the roof of a shed where the 10 men had taken refuge.
- The Soviet Union rejected a proposal by British Prime Minister Harold Wilson to come to Moscow, along with the leaders of three other British Commonwealth states (the United Kingdom, Ghana, Nigeria, and Trinidad and Tobago), on a peace mission to end the Vietnam War. Denying that the Soviet Union would have any influence over the Communist regime in North Vietnam, Soviet Premier Alexei Kosygin said that the USSR "has not been authorized by anybody to conduct talks on a settlement in Viet Nam and the Soviet Government does not intend to conduct such negotiations."
- The seventh Inter-Cities Fairs Cup championship, a predecessor to the UEFA Cup was played before 40,000 people at the Stadio Comunale at Turin in Italy, and was won by Ferencvárosi TC of Hungary over Juventus FC of Italy, 1 to 0.
- Born:
  - Bonehead (stage name for Paul Arthurs), English rock guitarist for the band Oasis; in Burnage
  - Hans Vestberg, Swedish businessman, CEO of Verizon Communications; in Hudiksvall
- Died: Mary Boland, 83, American stage and film actress

== June 24, 1965 (Thursday) ==
- The U.S. Department of State and the UK office of the Secretary of State for Commonwealth Relations reached a secret agreement for the United States to pay Britain for half of the costs of relocating residents of the Chagos Islands to places elsewhere in the British Indian Ocean Territory. In order to avoid informing either the U.S. Congress or the British Parliament of the deal, it was agreed that the British would receive a $14,000,000 discount on the amount that they had been required to contribute for research and development of the joint Polaris nuclear missile program.
- The Canberra Theatre in Australia, opened with a gala performance by The Australian Ballet.
- Born: Mum Jokmok, Thai comedian, actor, and film director; as Petchtai Wongkamlao in Yasothon province

== June 25, 1965 (Friday) ==
- All 85 people on board a U.S. Air Force C-135 Stratolifter were killed when their plane crashed into a mountainside, shortly after taking off from the El Toro Marine Air Station in California. The flight was bound for Okinawa.
- Two bombs went off at the My Canh, a "floating restaurant" in Saigon, killing 38 people and wounding 75.
- In Poland, the Fourth Cabinet of Prime Minister Józef Cyrankiewicz took office. Its members included future prime minister Piotr Jaroszewicz.
- Died: Burr Shafer, 65, American cartoonist and historian, author of the Through History with J. Wesley Smith series

== June 26, 1965 (Saturday) ==
- NASA announced the selection of six "scientist-astronauts" to begin specialized training at MSC for future crewed space missions to the Moon. The group, chosen by NASA from a group of 16 nominated by the National Academy of Sciences, included two physicians, Dr. Joseph P. Kerwin, a Navy flight surgeon, and Dr. Duane E. Graveline, a flight surgeon at MSC; two physicists, F. Curtis Michel of Rice University and Edward G. Gibson of the Aeronutronic division of Philco; one astrogeologist, Harrison H. Schmitt of the U.S. Geological Survey; and one electronics engineer, Owen K. Garriott of Stanford University. Schmitt would be the only one who would go on a lunar mission (Apollo 17), and one of only 12 people to walk on the Moon. Kerwin, Garriott and Gibson would travel on Skylab missions 2, 3 and 4, respectively, while Graveline and Michel would resign from the space program.
- Sixteen European missionaries, along with a woman and her two children, were rescued from captivity after being held hostage in the dense jungle near the city of Buta in the Democratic Republic of the Congo. Mercenary soldiers affiliated with the Congolese Army invaded the northern Congo town and saved the 19 people, the only survivors of about 50 Europeans who had been taken captive. After the group arrived safely in Leopoldville, Margaret Hayes, a 41-year-old British missionary nurse, told reporters later that she had survived two massacres, one at the end of May 1964, when 31 Dutch and Belgian priests were executed by the rebels, and another on November 25, when the rebels killed 16 foreigners, including five children.
- Mao Zedong, the Chairman of the Communist Party of the People's Republic of China, issued what would be called the "June 26th Directive", criticizing China's Ministry for Health and then ordering drastic reforms. "The Health Ministry renders service to only 15 percent of the nation's population", he wrote, and said that it should "be renamed the Urban Health Ministry or the 'Lords' Health Ministry'... in medical and health work, put the stress on the rural areas!" Changes made were to limit medical school to three years, followed by practice in rural villages, and to concentration on "the prevention and improved treatment of common diseases" rather than on complicated or hard-to-cure illnesses.
- General William C. Westmoreland, commanding the U.S. Army in South Vietnam, was granted authority by the Department of Defense "to commit U.S. ground forces anywhere in the country when, in his judgment, they were needed to strengthen South Vietnamese forces." By the end of 1965, there would be 184,000 American troops in Vietnam, more than eight times as many as had been there at the start of the year.

== June 27, 1965 (Sunday) ==
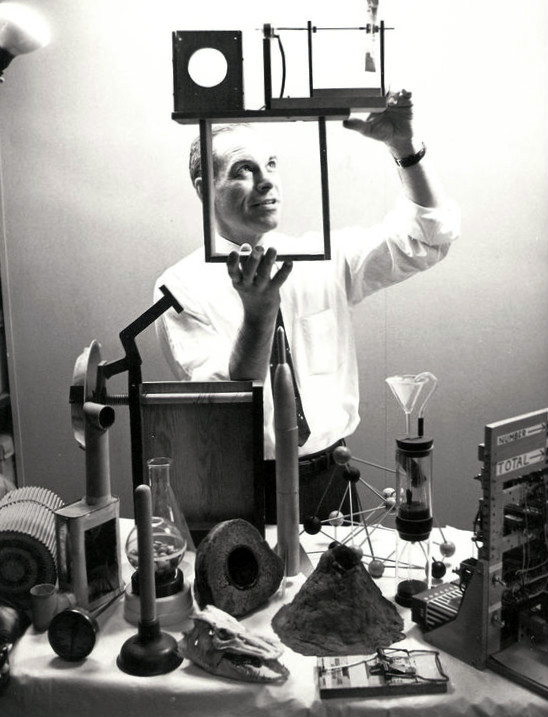
Mr. Wizard

- Watch Mr. Wizard, the first American science television show for children, ended a 14-year run on NBC. Donald Herbert Kemske, billed as Don Herbert, had been demonstrating and explaining science experiments on Sunday mornings since March 3, 1951.
- The Vietnam War's largest airmobile operation up to that point took place as 150 helicopters airlifted the U.S. Army's 173rd Airborne Brigade and two South Vietnamese Army airborne battalions to attack a Viet Cong stronghold just north of Biên Hòa, South Vietnam.
- Théo Lefèvre announced his resignation as Prime Minister of Belgium after being unable to form a coalition government following the loss of numerous seats in the May 23 elections.
- The 1965 French Grand Prix was held at Clermont-Ferrand and was won by Jim Clark.
- Born: Ashley Richardson, American model; in Sudbury, Massachusetts

== June 28, 1965 (Monday) ==
- Commercial telephone service by satellite was inaugurated between North America and Europe, with a conference call among leaders of the NATO member nations. President Lyndon Johnson of the United States spoke into a telephone at the White House cabinet room in Washington, and the signal was relayed by the Intelsat communications satellite to ground stations in Europe and was transmitted to British Prime Minister Harold Wilson and Canadian Prime Minister Lester Pearson (both in London); West German Chancellor Ludwig Erhard in Bonn; French Prime Minister Georges Pompidou in Paris; Switzerland's President Hans-Peter Tschudi in Berne; and Italy's Telecommunications Secretary, Ramon Gaspari, in Rome. The satellite, nicknamed "Early Bird", had been launched on April 6 and was made operational nearly three months later.
- Captain C. H. Kimes and his crew were able to safely land Pan Am Flight 843 even though the Boeing 707 jetliner had lost an engine, one-third of its right wing, and was on fire. With 143 passengers and a crew of ten on board, the plane had taken off from San Francisco on a flight to Honolulu, and the wing caught on fire after he cleared the runway. For the next 19 minutes, Kimes flew the plane in a circular course over the Pacific Ocean at an altitude of 1,400 feet until he could guide it inland again to Travis Air Force Base, 45 miles north of the San Francisco airport. Along the way, burning debris fell from the plane, and the engine fell through the roof of a cabinet shop in San Bruno, narrowly missing workers inside. Kimes was able to lower the landing gear manually after it failed to deploy on his first try, and the plane glided in smoothly.
- In a live speech on television, Queen Juliana of the Netherlands announced the engagement of her daughter, the Crown Princess Beatrix, to West German diplomat Claus von Amsberg, who had served in the German Army during World War II. After her mother was finished, Beatrix told viewers that "We realize there are people who have genuine rights to be unhappy about our engagement", given the brutality of the Nazi German occupation of Holland during the war, but asked for "time, peace and confidence to overcome our adversities." By law, the Dutch government had to give approval to the marriage in order for Beatrix to retain her right to become Queen.
- The DeFeo family moved from Brooklyn, New York, to 112 Ocean Avenue in Amityville, Long Island, New York, in the United States. The murder of all but one of the DeFeos nine years later, on November 13, 1974, by the oldest son, "Butch" DeFeo, and the subsequent claims of a haunting at 112 Ocean Avenue by the Lutz family, would lead to The Amityville Horror franchise of books and movies.
- János Kádár resigned his position as Prime Minister of Hungary and was succeeded by his deputy, Gyula Kállai. Kádár retained the more powerful position of General Secretary of the Hungarian Communist Party, continuing as the de facto leader of Hungary.
- The Indonesian newspaper Kompas was launched.
- Born: Belayneh Densamo, Ethiopian long-distance runner who held the world record for fastest marathon from 1988 to 1998; in Diramo Afarrara, Sidamo Province
- Died: Red Nichols (Ernest Loring Nichols), 60, American jazz musician; from a heart attack

== June 29, 1965 (Tuesday) ==
India

Pakistan

- India and Pakistan signed a cease-fire agreement bringing a halt to the fighting between the two nations over the disputed Rann of Kutch on the border between the two nations, bringing an end to fighting that had broken out in April. In New Delhi, the Pakistan High Commissioner, Arshad Hussain, signed the agreement along with Azim Hussain (no relation), a senior Secretary in India's Ministry of External Affairs, while another Indian government official signed an agreement with the Pakistan government at the same time in Karachi.
- The World Baptist Alliance held its convention at the Convention Hall in Miami Beach, Florida. The 12,000 delegates, most of whom were Baptists from the southeastern United States, voted to select a black man to be the organization's president, marking the first time that the voluntary alliance of Baptist Christian churches had picked a man of color. William R. Tolbert, Jr., who would later become President of Liberia, had served as the organization's vice-president since 1960. Dr. Porter Ruth, the Executive Director of the Southern Baptist Convention, the largest Baptist group in the United States, hailed Tolbert's election and described it as "tangible evidence of what we have long said, that people should be judged solely by their individual merits."
- U.S. Air Force Captain Joe Engle qualified to become the youngest American astronaut up to that time when he flew a North American X-15 high speed jet to an altitude of 85,527 metres (280,600 ft), or over 53 miles. He was 32 at the time, and would be selected for astronaut training the following year, though he would not be sent into outer space until 1981, when he would command the second flight of the Space Shuttle Columbia.
- Born:
  - Ignacio Provencio, German-born American neuroscientist who discovered the protein melanopsin; in Bitburg, West Germany
  - Matthew Weiner, American television producer known for creating Mad Men; in Baltimore

== June 30, 1965 (Wednesday) ==
- The "Empty Chair Crisis" began when President Charles de Gaulle withdrew France's representatives from the European Council of Ministers, after a failure to agree on the financing of the Common Agricultural Policy and the use of qualified majority voting in the European Economic Community (the EEC, or "Common Market"). On July 5, France would withdraw its people from committees on agriculture, foreign relations, and negotiations with Nigeria, and would boycott a July 6 meeting of EEC representatives in Geneva. The situation would eventually be resolved with the Luxembourg Compromise six months later. France's absence from Brussels would continue for seven months, and bring active negotiations in Geneva to a halt, until the Luxembourg compromise could be reached on January 29, 1966.
- New York became the first state in the United States to require apartment building landlords to provide a peephole for all entrance doors for apartment units. The bill, prompted by an increase in crime and signed by Governor Nelson Rockefeller, gave landlords six months to make the necessary installation so that tenants could see outside without opening the door. A separate bill, signed into law the same day, required building owners to install "at least two lights of no less than 50 watts each at the outside entrance to every building" and to have them operate from sunset to sunrise. The two new laws affected 150,000 apartments in New York City alone.
- The city of Roscoe, Illinois, was created, with fewer than 1,000 residents; by 2010, it would have a population of 10,785.
- Born: Zurmang Gharwang Rinpoche, monk and teacher in Tibetan Buddhism; in Gangtok, Sikkim principality
- Died: Bessie Barriscale, 80, American silent film and stage actress
