= Flight 843 =

Flight 843 may refer to

- Pan Am Flight 843, uncontained engine failure on 28 June 1965
- TWA Flight 843, crashed on 30 July 1992
- EgyptAir Flight 843, crashed on 7 May 2002
