= Edward Charlton =

Edward or Eddie Charlton may refer to:

- Edward Charlton, 5th Baron Charlton (1370–1421), 5th and last Baron Cherleton of Powys
- Sir Edward Charlton, 1st Baronet (died 1674)–see Charlton baronets
- Edward Charlton (historian) (1814–1874), English physician, writer and historian
- Edward Charlton (Royal Navy officer) (1865–1937), Royal Navy officer, Commander-in-Chief, Cape of Good Hope Station
- Edward Charlton (British Army officer) (1871–1961), British Army officer
- Edward Colquhoun Charlton (1920–1945), British Army soldier and recipient of the Victoria Cross
- Eddie Charlton (1929–2004), Australian snooker player
- Eddie Charlton (squash player) (born 1988), English squash player

== See also ==
- Charlton (surname)
