= James Charlton =

James Charlton may refer to:

- James Charlton (activist), American author and disability rights activist
- James Charlton (poet) (born 1947), Australian poet
- James Martin Charlton (born 1966), English playwright and theatre director
- Jim Charlton (1911–2013), Canadian coin dealer and numismatic publisher
