= John Charlton =

John Charlton may refer to:

- John Charlton (artist) (1849–1917), English painter and illustrator
- John Charlton (historian) (born 1938), British historian working in the Marxist tradition
- John Charlton (jockey) (1829–1862), English Derby-winning jockey
- John Charlton (MP), Member of Parliament (MP) for Malmesbury
- John A. Charlton (1907–1977), Canadian Member of Parliament (Brant, et al.)
- John M. Charlton (1829–1910), Canadian Member of Parliament (Norfolk North)
- John P. Charlton, American printer and postcard publisher
- John Robert Charlton, arrested in connection with the death of Ingrid Lyne
- John Thompson Charlton (1826–1878), politician in colonial Victoria (Australia)
- Jack Charlton (John Charlton, born 1935), English footballer

== See also ==
- John Chardon (died 1601), Bishop of Down and Connor
- John Charleton (disambiguation), the name of four Barons Cherleton in the 13th and 14th century
- John Charlton Fisher (1794–1849), Canadian author and journalist
- John Chorlton (1666–1705), English Presbyterian minister and tutor
