= Luna 5 =

Space probe

- Mission type: Lunar lander
- Operator: Soviet space program
- COSPAR ID: 1965-036A
- SATCAT no.: 01366
- Mission duration: 3 days (launch to impact)

Spacecraft properties
- Spacecraft type: Ye-6
- Manufacturer: OKB-1
- Launch mass: 1,476 kilograms (3,254 lb)

Start of mission
- Launch date: 9 May 1965, 07:49:37 UTC
- Rocket: Molniya-M 8K78M
- Launch site: Baikonur 1/5

Lunar impact (failed landing)
- Impact date: 12 May 1965, 19:10 UTC
- Impact site: 8°N 23°W

Luna 5, or E-6 No.10 (Ye-6 series), was an uncrewed Soviet spacecraft intended to land on the Moon as part of the Luna programme. It was intended to become the first spacecraft to achieve a soft landing on the Moon, however its retrorockets failed, and the spacecraft impacted the lunar surface.

== Launch ==
Luna 5 was launched by a Molniya-M carrier rocket, flying from Site 1/5 at the Baikonur Cosmodrome. Liftoff occurred at 07:49:37 UTC on 9 May 1965. The spacecraft and Blok L upper stage entered a low Earth parking orbit, before the Blok L fired to propel Luna 5 towards the Moon.

Luna 5 became the first Soviet probe to be successfully launched towards the Moon in two years. Between it and the previous mission to be launched successfully, Luna 4, there were three launch failures: E-6 No.6 and No.5 in 1964 and Kosmos 60 in 1965.

== Failure ==
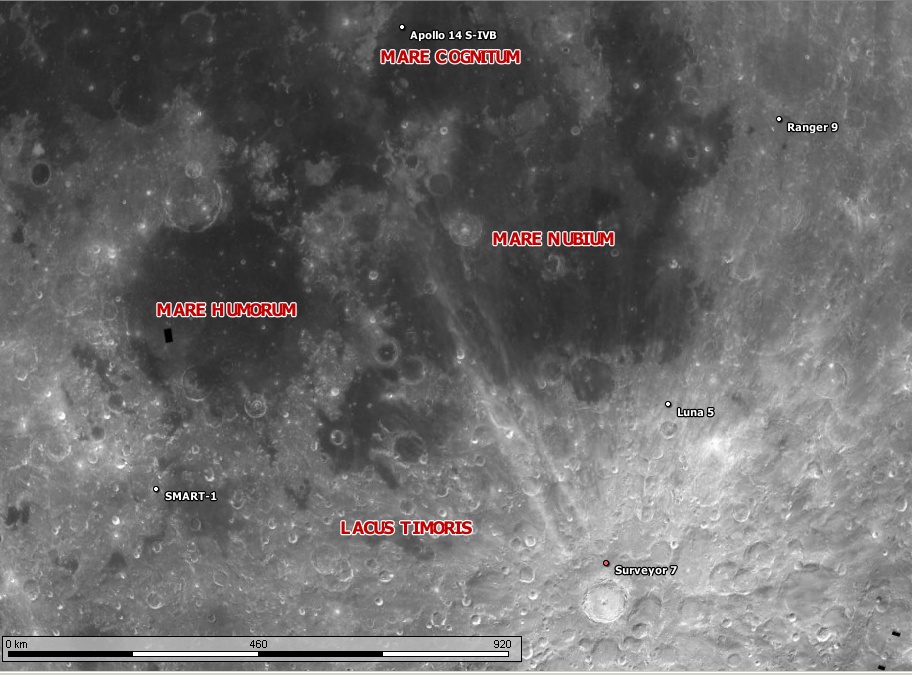
First announced location of the Luna 5 impact (lower right), in relation to other lunar probes and landing sites.

Following the mid-course correction on 10 May, the spacecraft began spinning around its main axis due to a problem in a flotation gyroscope in the I-100 guidance system unit. A subsequent attempt to fire the main engine failed because of ground control error, and the engine never fired. As a result of these failures, the soft landing attempt failed, and Luna 5 impacted the Moon. The place of impact was first announced as 31°S 8°W (coast of Mare Nubium), but later it was estimated as 8°N 23°W (near crater Copernicus). It was the second Soviet spacecraft to reach the surface of the Moon, following Luna 2 in 1959. The Abastumani Astrophysical Observatory registered television images of the failed landing noted that shown it produced a 220-by-80-kilometre (137 by 50 mi) plume which was visible for ten minutes. A 2017 analysis of the reprocessed images allowed to refine the impact coordinates, provide an altitude estimate of 3.7−3.9 km for the generated gas cloud and corroborate estimations published for the 2009 LCROSS impact.

== See also ==
- List of artificial objects on the Moon
- List of missions to the Moon
