= John Charlton (historian) =

British historian

John Charlton (born 1938 in Newcastle upon Tyne, United Kingdom), is a British historian working in the Marxist tradition. He was a founding member (1961) of the Newcastle Branch of the International Socialists (IS) and has been a member of the IS and Socialist Workers Party in York, Leeds and Newcastle. He is a visiting fellow in history at the University of Newcastle.

He was educated at Heaton Grammar School, Newcastle upon Tyne followed by Dudley College of Education. He is a graduate of York and Leeds universities and worked as a school teacher in Newcastle (1959–1964). Charlton lectured in History and Politics, Leeds Polytechnic (1970–1989) and Leeds University (1990–1999).

He is closely involved in the North East Labour History Society and has been Secretary and Editor of the Society's journal, North East History.

In 2010–11 he was leader of a Heritage Lottery Funded project, Mapping Popular Politics in the north east of England and he was working on a Peoples’ History of North East England.

== Publications ==
- The Chartists: The First National Workers' Movement (Pluto Press, 1997).
- It Just Went Like Tinder: The Mass Movement and New Unionism in Britain (Redwords, 1999).
- Anti-Capitalism: A Guide to the Movement (editor with Emma Bircham) (Bookmarks, 2001).
- Hidden Chains: the slavery business and north east England (Tyne Bridge Publishing, 2008).
- '1819: Waterloo, Peterloo and Newcastle Town Moor', North East History, 39, 2008.
- Don’t you hear the H-Bomb’s Thunder? Youth and Politics on Tyneside in the Late 'Fifties and Early 'Sixties (Merlin Press, 2009).
- Making Middle England, History and Social Action, 2017
