= Thomas Charlton =

Thomas or Tom Charlton may refer to:

- Thomas de Charlton, Archdeacon of Totnes in 1302
- Thomas Charlton (bishop) (died 1344), Bishop of Hereford, Lord High Treasurer of England, Lord Privy Seal, and Lord Chancellor of Ireland
- Thomas Charlton (MP) for Middlesex (died 1410)
- Thomas Charlton (speaker) (1417–1465), Speaker of the House of Commons of England in 1454
- Thomas U. P. Charlton (1779–1835), American writer and politician
- Thomas Charlton (cricketer) (1815–1886), English cricketer
- Tommy Charlton, English footballer (born circa 1887)
- Thomas Malcolm Charlton (1923–1997), British civil engineer and historian
- Thomas Charlton (rower) (Thomas Jackson Charlton, born 1934), American Olympic rower
- Thomas Jackson Charlton (physician) (1833–1886), American physician
- Thomas F. Charlton, representative elect for the Vermont House of Representatives

== See also ==
- Thomas Carlton (disambiguation)
