= James Charlton (poet) =

Australian poet and writer

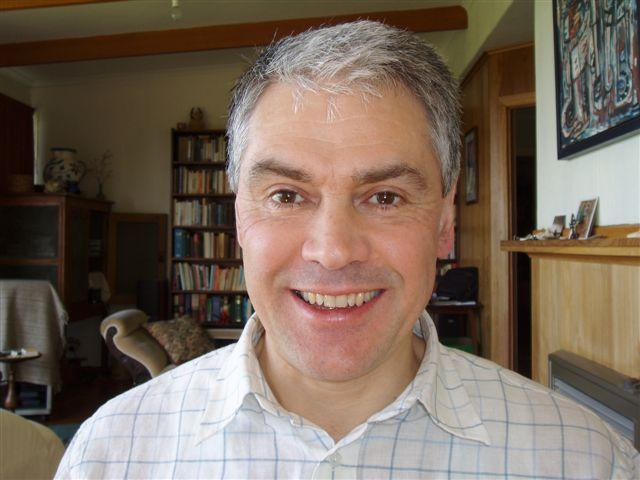
James Charlton

James Charlton (born 1947) is an Australian poet and writer in the area of interfaith and interreligious studies. Born in Melbourne, Australia, Charlton has lived mostly in Tasmania. He completed an MA at the University of Cambridge, where he was at Fitzwilliam College, and a PhD at the University of Tasmania. Poetry editor of the Australian literary quarterly Island from 2002 to 2008, he delivered the inaugural Gwen Harwood Memorial Lecture in 2008.

== Works ==
Charlton's Luminous Bodies was published in 2001 by Montpelier Press and tied for second place for the 2002 Anne Elder Award. So Much Light was published in 2007 by Pardalote Press.

Numerous poems of his have been published in anthologies, in literary journals (Australian, American and British) and in newspapers. Various poems have been broadcast. "Transgressive Saints", shortlisted for the 2006 Broadway Poetry Prize, was published in The Broadway Poetry Prize Winners 2006 by Picaro Press.

"Letter to Walt Whitman re: Iraq" was published in The Best Australian Poems 2006 by Black Inc.

Charlton's study of three European mystical poet-theologians, Non-dualism in Eckhart, Julian of Norwich and Traherne: A Theopoetic Reflection, was published by Bloomsbury in January 2013.

== Bibliography ==
=== Poetry ===
Collections

- Charlton, James (2002). Luminous Bodies. Montpelier Press. ISBN 1876597089.
- Charlton, James (2007). So much light. Pardalote Press. ISBN 9780980329711.

=== Non-fiction ===
- Charlton, James (2013). Non-dualism in Eckhart, Julian of Norwich and Traherne : a theopoetic reflection. Bloomsbury.

=== Selected critical studies and reviews of Charlton's work ===
So much light

- Leves, Kerry (Autumn 2009). "Caught in the melee we look for signals : new poetry". Overland. 194: 89–92.
