= William Charlton =

William Charlton may refer to:

== Politicians ==
- William Andrew Charlton (1841–1930), Canadian politician
- William Charlton (died 1567), MP for Shropshire
- William Charlton (Wisconsin politician) (1831–1908), American farmer and politician

== Sportsmen ==
- Billy Charlton (1900–1981), English footballer
- Bill Charlton (1912–1998), English footballer

== Others ==
- William Browell Charlton (1855–1932), British trade union leader
- William Charlton, musician in The Strange Death of Liberal England
- Bill Charlton (businessman), on This Is the Law
