= Ken Charlton =

Ken Charlton may refer to:

- Ken Charlton (basketball) (1941–2024), All-American basketball player at the University of Colorado
- Ken Charlton (Canadian football) (1920–2004), running back for the Saskatchewan Roughriders
- Ken Charlton (rugby league) (1923–2012), rugby league player for the Canterbury Bulldogs
