= Thomas Jackson Charlton (physician) =

American physician, 1833–1886

Thomas Jackson Charlton Jr.
- Born: March 5, 1833; Bryan County, Georgia, U.S.
- Died: December 8, 1886 (aged 53); Savannah, Georgia, U.S.
- Resting place: Bonaventure Cemetery, Savannah, Georgia, U.S.
- Occupation: Physician
- Spouse(s): Julia Catherine Crane (1860–1882; her death); Julia Turner Johnston (1883–1886; his death)
- Parent(s): Thomas Jackson Charlton Sr. Sarah Margaret Waters

Thomas Jackson Charlton Jr. (March 5, 1833 – December 8, 1886) was a 19th-century American medical doctor. He was assistant surgeon in both the Confederate States Navy and the United States Navy.

== Life and career ==
Charlton was the son of Thomas Charlton Sr. and Sarah Margaret Waters.

He graduated from Savannah Medical College in 1855 or 1856.

In 1857, he was appointed assistant surgeon in the United States Navy. He remained in the role for three years, then took a similar role in the Georgia Navy.

In 1860, he married Julia Catherine Crane, daughter of Heman Averill Crane.

He became assistant surgeon in the Confederate States Navy in 1862. He was captured by the USS Wachusett while aboard the CSS Florida in the harbor of Bahia, Brazil, in September 1864, and held prisoner in Fort Warren in Boston harbor. Upon release, early in 1865, he was told to leave the United States within ten days and not return south. As such, he travelled to England, then Halifax, Nova Scotia, before returning to Savannah after the war.

He was a member of the faculty of Savannah Medical College in 1869, five years before he set up his own practice in the city.

He became the attending physician at Savannah Hospital in 1876.

His first wife died in 1882; he remarried the following year, to Julia Turner Johnston, daughter of George H. Johnston.

One of his children was Thomas Jackson Charlton III, another noted physician.

== Death ==
Charlton died at his 145 Perry Street home in Savannah on December 8, 1886, aged 53. He was interred in Savannah's Bonaventure Cemetery, alongside his first wife. His second wife, who survived him by 39 years, was also buried in the same plot.
