= Pan Am Flight 843 =

1965 aviation accident over California

- The damage to the right wing

Accident
- Date: June 28, 1965
- Summary: Uncontained engine failure leading to partial structural failure
- Site: On climb-out from takeoff at San Francisco International Airport; 37°37′5.57″N 122°22′20.33″W

Aircraft
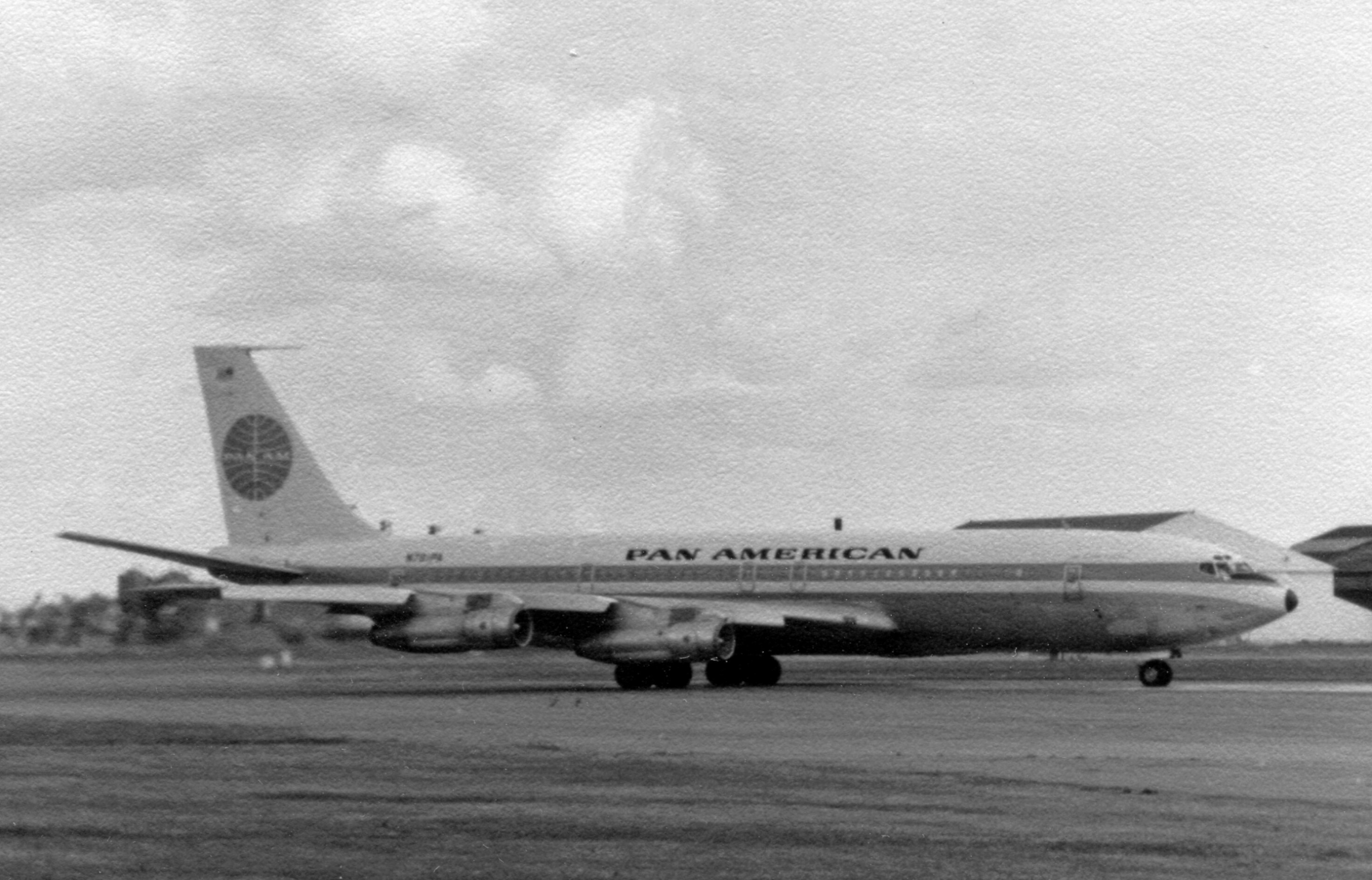
- N761PA, the aircraft involved in the accident, pictured in 1968
- Aircraft type: Boeing 707-321B
- Aircraft name: Clipper Friendship
- Operator: Pan American World Airways
- IATA flight No.: PA843
- ICAO flight No.: PAA843
- Call sign: CLIPPER 843
- Registration: N761PA
- Flight origin: San Francisco International Airport, Millbrae, California
- Destination: Honolulu International Airport, Honolulu, Hawaii
- Occupants: 153
- Passengers: 143
- Crew: 10
- Fatalities: 0
- Survivors: 153

Pan Am Flight 843 was a scheduled domestic commercial flight from San Francisco, California, to Honolulu, Hawaii. On Monday, June 28, 1965, Clipper Friendship, the Boeing 707 operating this route, experienced an uncontained engine failure shortly after take-off, but was successfully able to make an emergency landing at nearby Travis Air Force Base. The engine failure had been caused by faulty installation and maintenance procedures. The accident was filmed by a passenger.

== Accident ==
Flight 843, carrying 143 passengers and 10 crew members, departed from San Francisco International Airport around 2:00 pm PST (18:00 UTC). After going through the pre-flight checklist, Captain Charles Kimes, 44, let his co-pilot, Fred Miller, 48, handle the take-off. As the aircraft climbed to an altitude around 800 feet (244 m), the number-4 (outer-right) engine exploded, rupturing the right outboard fuel tank and igniting the fuel inside. The explosion and resulting fire caused the last 25 feet (8 m) of the right wing, along with the damaged engine, to break off from the rest of the aircraft. Captain Kimes radioed the tower, "I don't know whether I can keep it in the air or not."

The pilots were able to extinguish the fire, after which they headed for Travis Air Force Base for an emergency landing. During this time, passenger William Richmond and his wife recorded footage of the burning wing with their camera. Finally, about 34 minutes after taking off, and with the landing gear lowered by emergency means, Flight 843 landed safely at Travis, with all 153 people on board surviving unharmed. The success of the landing under the circumstances was described as a "miracle" by the news press.

== Investigation ==
Three days before the accident on 25 June, the number-4 engine was overhauled and seemed to work perfectly for 39 flight hours. The cause of the explosion was revealed to be a catastrophic failure of the engine's third-stage turbine disc, resulting from a loss of operating clearance between the disc and the third-stage inner sealing ring. Improper positioning of the turbine rotor, use of the wrong type of tool, and worn parts included in the engine assembly process were blamed for that loss of clearance. The Civil Aeronautics Board (CAB) accident report states that the inspector on duty during the reinstallation of the turbine rotor "signed off on work he had not inspected".

== Aftermath ==
The number-4 engine ripped through the roof of a cabinet shop in San Bruno. Slashing through a wooden beam, the jet engine then penetrated an 8-inch (20 cm) thick concrete wall, damaging equipment outside, and came to rest on a mound of soil. A large section of wing came down on Grand Avenue in South San Francisco, starting a grass fire. A 6-foot (1.8 m) section of the wing hit the ground in Holy Cross Cemetery and a charred chunk of the engine exhaust struck the rear of a housing area, also in South San Francisco. No injuries were reported.

While the passengers waited, Pan Am dispatched another 707 to Travis AFB to collect them and continue across the Pacific. This plane's nose gear collapsed on the runway, leaving the passengers dumbstruck. A third aircraft was sent, landing safely. Of the original 143 passengers, all but eight boarded the flight to Hawaii.

== Aircraft history ==
N761PA, Boeing 707-321B, Clipper Friendship, C/N 18336, was delivered to Pan Am on June 13, 1962. The aircraft was rebuilt and returned to service after this accident. It made an appearance in the 1966 film Dimension 5. In December 1976 the aircraft was withdrawn from service and placed in storage at Miami, Florida. Pan Am sold this Boeing 707 on March 10, 1977, to Dolphin Aviation, Inc., which in turn sold it to Air Manila, registered RP-C7075, on May 1, 1977. After several more operators, this Boeing 707 was bought on May 7, 1986, by the Boeing Military Airplane Company, and used as a source of spares for the Boeing KC-135E program. Reportedly, portions of the airframe are still extant at Davis-Monthan Air Force Base, Arizona.
