= Charleston =

Charleston most commonly refers to:

- Charleston, South Carolina, the most populous city in the state
- Charleston, West Virginia, the state capital and most populous city
- Charleston (dance), a type of dance named after the city in South Carolina

Charleston may also refer to:

== Places ==
=== Australia ===
- Charleston, South Australia

=== Canada ===
- Charleston, Newfoundland and Labrador
- Charleston, Nova Scotia

=== New Zealand ===
- Charleston, New Zealand

=== United Kingdom ===
- Charleston Farmhouse, Sussex, artists' house open to the public
- Charleston, Angus, near Dundee, Scotland
- Charleston, Dundee, Scotland
- Charleston, Paisley, Scotland

=== United States ===
- Charleston, Arizona, a ghost town
- Charleston, Arkansas, a city
- Charleston, Illinois, a city
- Charleston, Iowa, an unincorporated community
- Charleston, Kansas, an unincorporated community
- Charleston, Kentucky, an unincorporated community
- Charleston, Maine, a town
- Charleston, Mississippi, a city
- Charleston, Missouri, a city
- Charleston, Nevada, a ghost town
- Charleston, New Jersey, an unincorporated community
- Charleston, New Hampshire, a ghost town
- Charleston, New York, a town
- Charleston, Staten Island, in New York City, New York
- Charleston, North Carolina, a populated place
- Charleston, Oklahoma, a ghost town
- Charleston, Oregon, an unincorporated community
- Charleston, Tennessee, a city
- Charleston, Utah, a town
- Charleston, Vermont, a town
- Charleston County, South Carolina
- Charleston Township, Coles County, Illinois
- Charleston Township, Kalamazoo County, Michigan
- Charleston Township, Tioga County, Pennsylvania
- Mount Charleston, Nevada, Clark County, a town
- Mount Charleston, Nevada, a mountain
- North Charleston, South Carolina, a city
- South Charleston, Ohio, a village
- South Charleston, West Virginia, a city
- West Charleston, Ohio, an unincorporated community

== Naval history ==
- USS Charleston, several US Navy ships
- Charleston, later Texan schooner Zavala

== Railway stations ==
- Charleston station (West Virginia), US
- North Charleston station, South Carolina, US

== Education ==
- Charleston Collegiate School, South Carolina
- Charleston High School (disambiguation)
- College of Charleston, in South Carolina
  - Charleston Cougars, the school's athletic program
- University of Charleston, West Virginia
  - Charleston Golden Eagles, the school's athletic program
- Charleston Academy, Inverness, Scotland

== Music ==
- "Charleston" (1923 song)
- "Charleston", a song by Brendan James
- Charleston (Den Harrow song)
- "Charleston", a song by Sons of Bill
- "Charleston", a track on the 1979 Mike Oldfield album Platinum

== Other uses ==
- Charleston (name)
- Charleston (novel), a 2002 by John Jakes
- Charleston, a 1981 novel by Alexandra Ripley
- Charleston (1974 film), Italy
- Charleston (1977 film), Italy
- Charleston Open, a tennis tournament that takes place in Charleston, South Carolina
- Charleston, a procedure in American mahjong
- Charleston, a model of the Citroën 2CV car
- Charleston, restaurant in Baltimore, Maryland

== See also ==
- Charleston metropolitan area (disambiguation)
- Charlestown (disambiguation)
- Charlton (disambiguation)
- Charlottetown (disambiguation)
