= Charlestown =

Charlestown or Charles Town may refer to:

== Places ==
=== Australia ===
- Charlestown, New South Wales
  - Electoral district of Charlestown, an electoral district in the New South Wales Legislative Assembly including the area
- Charlestown, Queensland

=== Ireland ===
- Charlestown, County Mayo
  - Charlestown Shopping Centre, Dublin

=== South Africa ===
- Charlestown, KwaZulu-Natal

=== United Kingdom ===
==== England ====
- Charlestown, Cornwall
- Charlestown, Derbyshire
- Charlestown, Dorset
- Charlestown, Manchester, Greater Manchester
  - Charlestown (Manchester ward)
- Charlestown, Salford, Greater Manchester, a location
- Charlestown, Bradford, West Yorkshire, a location
- Charlestown, Calderdale, West Yorkshire, a location

==== Northern Ireland ====
- Bannfoot, County Armagh (also known as Charlestown)

==== Scotland ====
- Charlestown, Aberdeen, a location
- Charlestown, Aberdeenshire, a location
- Charlestown, Fife (also known as Charlestown-on-Forth)
- Charlestown, Black Isle, in the Highland council area
- Charlestown, Wester Ross, part of Gairloch, in the Highland council area
- Charlestown, Moray, a location

=== United States ===
- Charlestown, Indiana
- Charlestown, Maryland
- Charlestown, Boston, Massachusetts, a formerly independent city which is now part of Boston
- Charleston, South Carolina, called Charles Town from its founding in 1680 until 1783
- Charlestown, Nebraska
- Charlestown, New Hampshire
  - Charlestown (CDP), New Hampshire
- Charlestown, New Jersey
- Charlestown Township, Portage County, Ohio
- Charlestown, Pennsylvania
- Charlestown, Rhode Island
  - Charlestown (CDP), Rhode Island
  - Naval Auxiliary Air Station Charlestown
- Charles Town, West Virginia, called Charlestown before West Virginia became a state; renamed to avoid confusion with the state capital, Charleston.
- Charlestown, Wisconsin

=== West Indies ===
- Nassau, Bahamas, formerly Charles Town
- Charles Town, Jamaica
- Charlestown, Nevis
- Charlestown, Saint Vincent and the Grenadines

== Other uses ==
- Charlestown (album), an album by Guy Manning
- Charles Town (cricketer) (1796–1845)
- Charlestown, Pennsylvania, fictional setting of the film Slap Shot

== See also ==
- Charleston (disambiguation)
- Charlton (disambiguation)
- Charles Towne (disambiguation)
