= Charlton Park =

Charlton Park may refer to:

- Charlton Park, Cheltenham, Gloucestershire, a location in England
- Charlton Park, Wiltshire, England, residence of the Earl and Countess of Suffolk
- WOMAD Charlton Park, WOMAD festival in Wiltshire, England
- Historic Charlton Park, Barry County, Michigan, United States
- Charlton Park, Greenwich, a park in south-east London, England
- Charlton Park RFC, a rugby club based in south-east London, England
