= Charlton =

Charlton may refer to:

== People ==
- Charlton (surname)
- Charlton (given name)

== Places ==
=== Australia ===
- Charlton, Queensland
- Charlton, Victoria
- Division of Charlton, an electoral district in the Australian House of Representatives, in New South Wales

=== Canada ===
- Charlton, Ontario
- Charlton Island, Nunavut

=== England ===
- Hundred of Charlton, a hundred in the Wokingham area of Berkshire
- Charlton, Bristol, a village in Gloucestershire near Bristol, demolished in 1949
- Charlton, Hampshire
- Charlton, Hertfordshire
- Charlton, London, formerly a village, now a district
- Charlton, Northamptonshire
- Charlton, Northumberland
- Charlton, Oxfordshire, a location in Wantage
- Charlton, Shropshire
- Charlton, Kilmersdon, Mendip district, Somerset
- Charlton, Shepton Mallet, Mendip district, Somerset
- Charlton, Taunton Deane, Somerset
- Charlton, Surrey (formerly Middlesex)
- Charlton, West Sussex
- Charlton, Brinkworth, Wiltshire
- Charlton, Donhead St Mary, South Wiltshire
- Charlton St Peter, Pewsey Vale, Wiltshire
- Charlton, Worcestershire, near Fladbury
- Charlton, Hartlebury, a location in Worcestershire

=== New Zealand ===
- Charlton, New Zealand

=== United States ===
- Charlton, Massachusetts
- Charlton, New York
- Charlton County, Georgia
- Charlton Township, Michigan

== Buildings in England ==
- Charlton Castle, Shropshire
- Charlton House, London
- Charlton House, Charlton Mackrell, Somerset
- Charlton House, Wraxall, Somerset

== Other uses ==
- Charlton (ship), two ships
- Charlton Athletic F.C., an English football team based in the London district of that name
- Charlton Avenue (Hamilton, Ontario), Canada
- Charlton Comics, American comic book company (1946–1986)
- Charlton Down, a village in Dorset, England
- Charlton Press, a Canadian book publishing company which produces price guides and other books on collectibles
- Charlton School, a coeducational secondary school in Telford, Shropshire, England
- Charlton College of Business, University of Massachusetts Dartmouth

== See also ==
- Carlton Television, a British television franchise
- Charlton-on-Otmoor, Oxfordshire
- Charlton Abbots, Gloucestershire
- Charlton Adam, Somerset
- Charlton Horethorne, Somerset
- Charlton Kings, a suburb of Cheltenham
- Charlton Mackrell, Somerset
- Charlton Musgrove, Somerset
- Queen Charlton, Somerset
- Charlton-All-Saints, near Downton, South Wiltshire
- Charleton, parish, Devon, England
- Charltons, Redcar and Cleveland, North Yorkshire, England
- Charleston (disambiguation)
- Charlestown (disambiguation)
- Carlton (disambiguation)
- Chalton, Bedfordshire, England
- Chalton, Hampshire, England
