= List of United Kingdom locations: Char-Che =

The United Kingdom

This is part of the list of United Kingdom locations: a gazetteer of place names in the United Kingdom showing each place's locality and geographical coordinates.

== Cha (continued) ==
=== Char ===
Location	Locality	Coordinates (links to map & photo sources)	OS grid reference
Charaton Cross	Cornwall	50.49°N 04.39°W	SX3069
Charcott	Kent	51.20°N 00.17°E	TQ5247
Chard	Somerset	50.86°N 02.96°W	ST3208
Chard Junction	Dorset	50.83°N 02.93°W	ST3404
Chardleigh Green	Somerset	50.88°N 02.98°W	ST3110
Chardstock	Devon	50.83°N 02.99°W	ST3004
Charfield	South Gloucestershire	51.62°N 02.40°W	ST7292
Charfield Green	South Gloucestershire	51.62°N 02.40°W	ST7292
Charfield Hill	South Gloucestershire	51.62°N 02.42°W	ST7192
Charford	Worcestershire	52.31°N 02.07°W	SO9569
Chargrove	Gloucestershire	51.86°N 02.11°W	SO9219
Charing	Kent	51.20°N 00.79°E	TQ9549
Charing Heath	Kent	51.20°N 00.74°E	TQ9249
Charing Hill	Kent	51.21°N 00.80°E	TQ9650
Charingworth	Gloucestershire	52.04°N 01.70°W	SP2039
Charlbury	Oxfordshire	51.86°N 01.49°W	SP3519
Charlcombe	Bath and North East Somerset	51.40°N 02.37°W	ST7467
Charlcutt	Wiltshire	51.47°N 02.03°W	ST9875
Charlecote	Warwickshire	52.20°N 01.62°W	SP2656
Charlemont	Sandwell	52.53°N 01.98°W	SP0193
Charles	Devon	51.07°N 03.88°W	SS6832
Charles Bottom	Devon	51.06°N 03.88°W	SS6831
Charlesfield	Scottish Borders	55.55°N 02.66°W	NT5829
Charleshill	Surrey	51.18°N 00.72°W	SU8944
Charleston	Renfrewshire	55.82°N 04.42°W	NS4862
Charleston	Angus	56.59°N 03.01°W	NO3845
Charlestown	Cornwall	50.32°N 04.75°W	SX0451
Charlestown	Dorset	50.60°N 02.51°W	SY6479
Charlestown (Black Isle)	Highland	57.50°N 04.27°W	NH6448
Charlestown (Wester Ross)	Highland	57.71°N 05.69°W	NG8075
Charlestown	Moray	57.68°N 03.46°W	NJ1367
Charlestown	Aberdeenshire	57.65°N 01.91°W	NK0563
Charlestown	Bradford	53.83°N 01.77°W	SE1538
Charlestown	Calderdale	53.73°N 02.04°W	SD9726
Charlestown	Manchester	53.52°N 02.21°W	SD8603
Charlestown	Salford	53.48°N 02.28°W	SJ8199
Charlestown	Derbyshire	53.42°N 01.95°W	SK0392
Charlestown	Fife	56.03°N 03.51°W	NT0683
Charlestown	City of Aberdeen	57.09°N 02.11°W	NJ9300
Charlestown of Aberlour	Moray	57.46°N 03.23°W	NJ2642
Charles Tye	Suffolk	52.12°N 00.95°E	TM0252
Charlesworth	Derbyshire	53.43°N 02.00°W	SK0093
Charlton	Greenwich	51.48°N 00.02°E	TQ4178
Charlton	Hampshire	51.22°N 01.50°W	SU3547
Charlton	Hertfordshire	51.93°N 00.29°W	TL1728
Charlton	Northamptonshire	52.02°N 01.24°W	SP5236
Charlton	Northumberland	55.15°N 02.31°W	NY8085
Charlton	Oxfordshire	51.58°N 01.42°W	SU4088
Charlton	Shropshire	52.69°N 02.60°W	SJ5911
Charlton (Kilmersdon)	Somerset	51.26°N 02.46°W	ST6852
Charlton (Shepton Mallet)	Somerset	51.18°N 02.53°W	ST6343
Charlton (Taunton Deane)	Somerset	51.02°N 03.01°W	ST2926
Charlton	Surrey	51.40°N 00.44°W	TQ0869
Charlton	West Sussex	50.90°N 00.74°W	SU8812
Charlton (Brinkworth)	Wiltshire	51.59°N 02.05°W	ST9688
Charlton (Donhead St Mary)	Wiltshire	50.99°N 02.14°W	ST9022
Charlton (Hartlebury)	Worcestershire	52.33°N 02.25°W	SO8371
Charlton (Fladbury)	Worcestershire	52.10°N 01.98°W	SP0145
Charlton Abbots	Gloucestershire	51.91°N 01.95°W	SP0324
Charlton Adam	Somerset	51.04°N 02.67°W	ST5328
Charlton-All-Saints	Wiltshire	51.00°N 01.75°W	SU1723
Charltonbrook	Sheffield	53.46°N 01.48°W	SK3496
Charlton Horethorne	Somerset	51.00°N 02.48°W	ST6623
Charlton Kings	Gloucestershire	51.87°N 02.05°W	SO9620
Charlton Mackrell	Somerset	51.04°N 02.68°W	ST5228
Charlton Marshall	Dorset	50.82°N 02.14°W	ST9003
Charlton Musgrove	Somerset	51.07°N 02.40°W	ST7231
Charlton-on-Otmoor	Oxfordshire	51.83°N 01.18°W	SP5615
Charlton on the Hill	Dorset	50.82°N 02.15°W	ST8903
Charlton Park	Gloucestershire	51.87°N 02.07°W	SO9520
Charlton Riverside	Greenwich	51.494°N 0.037°E	TQ415792
Charlton St Peter	Wiltshire	51.30°N 01.84°W	SU1156
Charltons	Redcar and Cleveland	54.52°N 01.01°W	NZ6415
Charlwood	Hampshire	51.07°N 01.04°W	SU6731
Charlwood	East Sussex	51.08°N 00.01°W	TQ3934
Charlwood	Surrey	51.15°N 00.22°W	TQ2441
Charlynch	Somerset	51.12°N 03.10°W	ST2337
Charminster	Dorset	50.72°N 02.45°W	SY6892
Charminster	Bournemouth	50.74°N 01.85°W	SZ1094
Charmouth	Dorset	50.73°N 02.90°W	SY3693
Charnage	Wiltshire	51.07°N 02.24°W	ST8331
Charndon	Buckinghamshire	51.91°N 01.02°W	SP6724
Charnes	Staffordshire	52.89°N 02.34°W	SJ7733
Charney Bassett	Oxfordshire	51.64°N 01.45°W	SU3894
Charnock Green	Lancashire	53.63°N 02.68°W	SD5516
Charnock Hall	Sheffield	53.33°N 01.43°W	SK3882
Charnock Richard	Lancashire	53.63°N 02.68°W	SD5515
Charsfield	Suffolk	52.15°N 01.28°E	TM2556
Chart Corner	Kent	51.22°N 00.56°E	TQ7950
Charter Alley	Hampshire	51.30°N 01.15°W	SU5957
Charterhouse	Somerset	51.29°N 02.71°W	ST5055
Chartershall	Stirling	56.08°N 03.94°W	NS7990
Charterville Allotments	Oxfordshire	51.78°N 01.55°W	SP3110
Chartham	Kent	51.24°N 01.00°E	TR1054
Chartham Hatch	Kent	51.26°N 01.00°E	TR1056
Chart Hill	Kent	51.21°N 00.56°E	TQ7949
Chartridge	Buckinghamshire	51.71°N 00.65°W	SP9303
Chart Sutton	Kent	51.22°N 00.56°E	TQ7950
Charvil	Berkshire	51.47°N 00.89°W	SU7776
Charwelton	Northamptonshire	52.19°N 01.22°W	SP5355

=== Chas-Chaz ===
Location	Locality	Coordinates (links to map & photo sources)	OS grid reference
Chase Cross	Havering	51.60°N 00.16°E	TQ5092
Chase End Street	Gloucestershire	52.01°N 02.35°W	SO7635
Chase Hill	South Gloucestershire	51.59°N 02.39°W	ST7388
Chase Terrace	Staffordshire	52.67°N 01.94°W	SK0409
Chasetown	Staffordshire	52.67°N 01.92°W	SK0508
Chastleton	Oxfordshire	51.95°N 01.65°W	SP2429
Chasty	Devon	50.79°N 04.35°W	SS3402
Chatburn	Lancashire	53.89°N 02.36°W	SD7644
Chatcull	Staffordshire	52.90°N 02.31°W	SJ7934
Chatford	Shropshire	52.64°N 02.78°W	SJ4705
Chatham	Caerphilly	51.59°N 03.14°W	ST2189
Chatham	Kent	51.35°N 00.52°E	TQ7665
Chatham Green	Essex	51.80°N 00.47°E	TL7115
Chathill	Northumberland	55.52°N 01.71°W	NU1826
Chat Hill	Bradford	53.78°N 01.83°W	SE1132
Chatley	Worcestershire	52.24°N 02.22°W	SO8561
Chatsworth	Derbyshire	53.22°N 01.61°W	SK2569
Chattenden	Kent	51.41°N 00.51°E	TQ7571
Chatter End	Essex	51.90°N 00.13°E	TL4725
Chatteris	Cambridgeshire	52.44°N 00.04°E	TL3985
Chatterley	Staffordshire	53.05°N 02.24°W	SJ8451
Chattern Hill	Surrey	51.42°N 00.44°W	TQ0871
Chatterton	Lancashire	53.65°N 02.31°W	SD7918
Chatterton Village	Bromley	51.393°N 00.035°W	TQ417680
Chattisham	Suffolk	52.03°N 01.04°E	TM0942
Chattle Hill	Warwickshire	52.50°N 01.72°W	SP1990
Chatto	Scottish Borders	55.44°N 02.36°W	NT7717
Chatton	Northumberland	55.54°N 01.92°W	NU0528
Chaulden	Hertfordshire	51.74°N 00.50°W	TL0306
Chaul End	Bedfordshire	51.87°N 00.47°W	TL0521
Chavel	Shropshire	52.71°N 02.86°W	SJ4213
Chavenage Green	Gloucestershire	51.65°N 02.20°W	ST8695
Chavey Down	Berkshire	51.41°N 00.72°W	SU8969
Chawleigh	Devon	50.89°N 03.83°W	SS7112
Chawley	Oxfordshire	51.73°N 01.32°W	SP4704
Chawson	Worcestershire	52.25°N 02.17°W	SO8862
Chawston	Bedfordshire	52.19°N 00.31°W	TL1556
Chawton	Hampshire	51.12°N 01.00°W	SU7037
Chaxhill	Gloucestershire	51.82°N 02.37°W	SO7414
Chazey Heath	Oxfordshire	51.48°N 01.00°W	SU6977

== Che ==
Location	Locality	Coordinates (links to map & photo sources)	OS grid reference
Cheadle	Stockport	53.38°N 02.21°W	SJ8688
Cheadle	Staffordshire	52.98°N 01.98°W	SK0143
Cheadle Heath	Stockport	53.39°N 02.19°W	SJ8789
Cheadle Hulme	Stockport	53.37°N 02.19°W	SJ8786
Cheadle Park	Staffordshire	52.98°N 02.00°W	SK0043
Cheam	Surrey	51.34°N 00.22°W	TQ2462
Cheapside	Hertfordshire	51.97°N 00.03°E	TL4033
Cheapside	Berkshire	51.41°N 00.64°W	SU9469
Chearsley	Buckinghamshire	51.78°N 00.97°W	SP7110
Chebsey	Staffordshire	52.84°N 02.20°W	SJ8628
Checkendon	Oxfordshire	51.54°N 01.04°W	SU6683
Checkley	Cheshire	53.01°N 02.40°W	SJ7346
Checkley	Herefordshire	52.03°N 02.59°W	SO5938
Checkley	Staffordshire	52.93°N 01.97°W	SK0237
Checkley Green	Cheshire	53.00°N 02.41°W	SJ7245
Chedburgh	Suffolk	52.18°N 00.61°E	TL7957
Cheddar	Somerset	51.27°N 02.78°W	ST4553
Cheddington	Buckinghamshire	51.84°N 00.66°W	SP9217
Cheddleton	Staffordshire	53.06°N 02.04°W	SJ9752
Cheddleton Heath	Staffordshire	53.07°N 02.03°W	SJ9853
Cheddon Fitzpaine	Somerset	51.03°N 03.08°W	ST2427
Chedglow	Wiltshire	51.63°N 02.08°W	ST9493
Chedgrave	Norfolk	52.53°N 01.47°E	TM3699
Chedington	Dorset	50.84°N 02.73°W	ST4805
Chediston	Suffolk	52.34°N 01.44°E	TM3577
Chediston Green	Suffolk	52.34°N 01.44°E	TM3578
Chedworth	Gloucestershire	51.79°N 01.92°W	SP0511
Chedworth Laines	Gloucestershire	51.79°N 01.95°W	SP0311
Chedzoy	Somerset	51.12°N 02.94°W	ST3437
Cheese Bay	Western Isles	57.64°N 07.09°W	NF9673
Cheetham Hill	Manchester	53.49°N 02.24°W	SD8400
Cheglinch	Devon	51.16°N 04.13°W	SS5143
Chegworth	Kent	51.23°N 00.63°E	TQ8452
Cheldon	Devon	50.90°N 03.80°W	SS7313
Chelfham	Devon	51.09°N 03.98°W	SS6135
Chelford	Cheshire	53.26°N 02.28°W	SJ8174
Chellaston	Derbyshire	52.86°N 01.45°W	SK3730
Chell Heath	City of Stoke-on-Trent	53.06°N 02.19°W	SJ8752
Chellington	Bedfordshire	52.18°N 00.61°W	SP9555
Chells	Hertfordshire	51.90°N 00.16°W	TL2625
Chelmarsh	Shropshire	52.48°N 02.41°W	SO7287
Chelmer Village	Essex	51.73°N 00.50°E	TL7307
Chelmick	Shropshire	52.51°N 02.79°W	SO4691
Chelmondiston	Suffolk	51.98°N 01.20°E	TM2037
Chelmorton	Derbyshire	53.21°N 01.83°W	SK1169
Chelmsford	Essex	51.72°N 00.46°E	TL7006
Chelmsine	Somerset	50.95°N 03.15°W	ST1918
Chelmsley Wood	Solihull	52.47°N 01.73°W	SP1886
Chelsea	Kensington and Chelsea	51.47°N 00.17°W	TQ2777
Chelsfield	Bromley	51.35°N 00.09°E	TQ4664
Chelsfield Village	Bromley	51.358°N 00.129°E	TQ483642
Chelsham	Surrey	51.31°N 00.03°W	TQ3759
Chelston	Somerset	50.98°N 03.21°W	ST1521
Chelston	Devon	50.46°N 03.56°W	SX8964
Chelston Heathfield	Somerset	50.98°N 03.19°W	ST1621
Chelsworth	Suffolk	52.08°N 00.88°E	TL9847
Chelsworth Common	Suffolk	52.08°N 00.88°E	TL9847
Cheltenham	Gloucestershire	51.89°N 02.08°W	SO9422
Chelveston	Northamptonshire	52.31°N 00.54°W	SP9969
Chelvey	North Somerset	51.40°N 02.77°W	ST4668
Chelvey Batch	North Somerset	51.39°N 02.76°W	ST4767
Chelwood	Bath and North East Somerset	51.34°N 02.53°W	ST6361
Chelwood Common	East Sussex	51.03°N 00.01°E	TQ4128
Chelwood Gate	East Sussex	51.04°N 00.01°E	TQ4129
Chelworth	Wiltshire	51.64°N 02.04°W	ST9794
Chelworth Lower Green	Wiltshire	51.62°N 01.88°W	SU0892
Chelworth Upper Green	Wiltshire	51.62°N 01.88°W	SU0892
Chelynch	Somerset	51.18°N 02.50°W	ST6543
Chemistry	Shropshire	52.96°N 02.70°W	SJ5341
Cheney Longville	Shropshire	52.45°N 02.85°W	SO4284
Chenhalls	Cornwall	50.16°N 05.43°W	SW5535
Chenies	Buckinghamshire	51.67°N 00.54°W	TQ0198
Chepstow	Monmouthshire	51.63°N 02.68°W	ST5393
Chequerbent	Bolton	53.55°N 02.49°W	SD6706
Chequerfield	Wakefield	53.67°N 01.30°W	SE4620
Chequers Corner	Norfolk	52.64°N 00.20°E	TF4908
Chequertree	Kent	51.09°N 00.89°E	TR0337
Cherhill	Wiltshire	51.42°N 01.95°W	SU0370
Cherington	Gloucestershire	51.68°N 02.14°W	ST9098
Cherington	Warwickshire	52.02°N 01.57°W	SP2936
Cheristow	Devon	50.99°N 04.49°W	SS2525
Cheriton	Devon	51.19°N 03.81°W	SS7346
Cheriton	Hampshire	51.04°N 01.17°W	SU5828
Cheriton	Kent	51.08°N 01.12°E	TR1936
Cheriton (or Stackpole Elidor)	Pembrokeshire	51.63°N 04.92°W	SR9897
Cheriton	Swansea	51.61°N 04.24°W	SS4593
Cheriton Bishop	Devon	50.72°N 03.74°W	SX7793
Cheriton Cross	Devon	50.71°N 03.74°W	SX7792
Cheriton Fitzpaine	Devon	50.84°N 03.62°W	SS8606
Cherrington	Shropshire	52.76°N 02.50°W	SJ6619
Cherrybank	Perth and Kinross	56.38°N 03.45°W	NO1022
Cherry Burton	East Riding of Yorkshire	53.86°N 00.49°W	SE9942
Cherry Green	Essex	51.93°N 00.28°E	TL5729
Cherry Green	Hertfordshire	51.90°N 00.03°W	TL3525
Cherry Hinton	Cambridgeshire	52.18°N 00.16°E	TL4856
Cherry Orchard	Shropshire	52.70°N 02.75°W	SJ4912
Cherry Orchard	Worcestershire	52.17°N 02.22°W	SO8553
Cherry Tree	Lancashire	53.72°N 02.53°W	SD6525
Cherry Tree	Stockport	53.40°N 02.07°W	SJ9590
Cherrytree Hill	City of Derby	52.92°N 01.43°W	SK3836
Cherry Willingham	Lincolnshire	53.23°N 00.45°W	TF0372
Chertsey	Surrey	51.38°N 00.50°W	TQ0466
Chertsey Meads	Surrey	51.38°N 00.49°W	TQ0566
Cheselbourne	Dorset	50.79°N 02.34°W	SY7699
Chesham	Buckinghamshire	51.69°N 00.61°W	SP9601
Chesham	Bury	53.60°N 02.28°W	SD8112
Chesham Bois	Buckinghamshire	51.68°N 00.61°W	SU9699
Cheshunt	Hertfordshire	51.70°N 00.04°W	TL3502
Chesil	Dorset	50.55°N 02.45°W	SY6873
Chesil Beach	Dorset	50.61°N 02.53°W	SY621796
Chesley	Kent	51.33°N 00.65°E	TQ8563
Cheslyn Hay	Staffordshire	52.66°N 02.04°W	SJ9707
Chessetts Wood	Warwickshire	52.35°N 01.73°W	SP1873
Chessington	Kingston upon Thames	51.35°N 00.30°W	TQ1863
Chessmount	Buckinghamshire	51.69°N 00.61°W	SP9601
Chestall	Staffordshire	52.70°N 01.92°W	SK0512
Chester	Cheshire	53.18°N 02.89°W	SJ4066
Chesterblade	Somerset	51.16°N 02.48°W	ST6641
Chesterfield	Derbyshire	53.23°N 01.43°W	SK3871
Chesterfield	Staffordshire	52.64°N 01.85°W	SK1005
Chesterhill (or Edgehead)	Midlothian	55.87°N 03.00°W	NT3765
Chesterhope	Northumberland	55.15°N 02.17°W	NY8985
Chesterknowes	Scottish Borders	55.52°N 02.76°W	NT5226
Chester-le-Street	Durham	54.85°N 01.58°W	NZ2751
Chester Moor	Durham	54.83°N 01.59°W	NZ2649
Chesters	Scottish Borders	55.38°N 02.60°W	NT6210
Chesterton (Huntingdonshire)	Cambridgeshire	52.54°N 00.34°W	TL1295
Chesterton (Cambridge)	Cambridgeshire	52.21°N 00.13°E	TL4660
Chesterton	Shropshire	52.57°N 02.32°W	SO7897
Chesterton	Warwickshire	52.21°N 01.48°W	SP3558
Chesterton	Oxfordshire	51.88°N 01.18°W	SP5621
Chesterton	Gloucestershire	51.69°N 01.98°W	SP0100
Chesterton	Staffordshire	53.03°N 02.25°W	SJ8349
Chesterton Green	Warwickshire	52.21°N 01.50°W	SP3458
Chesterwood	Northumberland	54.97°N 02.28°W	NY8265
Chestfield	Kent	51.34°N 01.05°E	TR1365
Chestnut Hill	Cumbria	54.59°N 03.13°W	NY2723
Chestnut Street	Kent	51.33°N 00.68°E	TQ8763
Cheston	Devon	50.40°N 03.85°W	SX6858
Cheswardine	Shropshire	52.85°N 02.43°W	SJ7129
Cheswell	Shropshire	52.75°N 02.43°W	SJ7117
Cheswick	Northumberland	55.70°N 01.95°W	NU0346
Cheswick Buildings	Northumberland	55.69°N 01.96°W	NU0245
Cheswick Green	Solihull	52.37°N 01.82°W	SP1275
Chetnole	Dorset	50.87°N 02.56°W	ST6008
Chettiscombe	Devon	50.91°N 03.48°W	SS9614
Chettisham	Cambridgeshire	52.42°N 00.26°E	TL5483
Chettle	Dorset	50.91°N 02.07°W	ST9513
Chetton	Shropshire	52.50°N 02.50°W	SO6690
Chetwode	Buckinghamshire	51.95°N 01.06°W	SP6429
Chetwynd Aston	Shropshire	52.75°N 02.37°W	SJ7517
Cheveley	Cambridgeshire	52.21°N 00.45°E	TL6860
Chevening	Kent	51.29°N 00.12°E	TQ4857
Cheverell's Green	Hertfordshire	51.82°N 00.47°W	TL0515
Chevin End	Bradford	53.89°N 01.72°W	SE1844
Chevington	Suffolk	52.20°N 00.60°E	TL7859
Chevithorne	Devon	50.92°N 03.46°W	SS9715
Chew Magna	Bath and North East Somerset	51.36°N 02.61°W	ST5763
Chew Moor	Bolton	53.55°N 02.51°W	SD6607
Chew Stoke	Bath and North East Somerset	51.34°N 02.64°W	ST5561
Chewton Keynsham	Bath and North East Somerset	51.39°N 02.50°W	ST6566
Chewton Mendip	Somerset	51.27°N 02.58°W	ST5953
Cheylesmore	Coventry	52.39°N 01.51°W	SP3377
