= Jurassic Coaster =

Bus service in Dorset, England

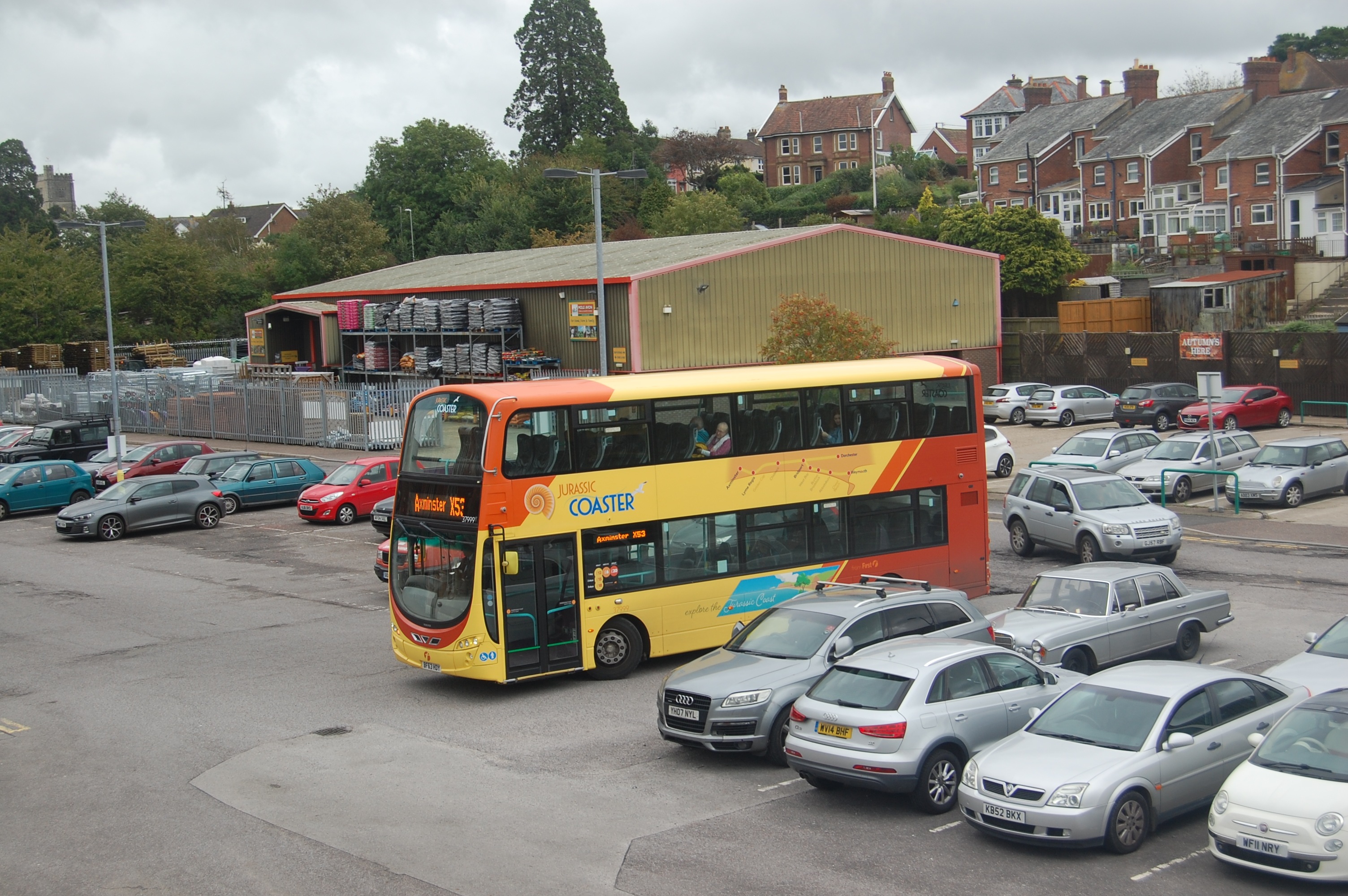
- A First Hampshire & Dorset Volvo B9TL Wright Eclipse Gemini 2 on route X53 at Axminster Station in September 2019

Overview
- Operator: First Hampshire & Dorset
- Vehicle: Closed Top; Volvo B9TL Wright Eclipse Gemini 2 Alexander Dennis Enviro400; Alexander Dennis Enviro400 MMC; Open top Volvo B7TL Wright Eclipse Gemini; Volvo B7TL Alexander ALX400
- Began service: November 1998
- Former operator(s): Southern National

The Jurassic Coaster is a bus service operated by the Weymouth branch of First Hampshire & Dorset, running around the Jurassic coastline of the county of Dorset. It features five routes, stretching from Axminster in the west to Poole in the east, with one of the routes in TripAdvisor's 2018 poll of most scenic bus routes coming in 12th place.

== History ==
The X53 route was introduced in November 1998 by Southern National, and operated at a frequency of one bus every three hours between Exeter and Dorchester via Seaton, Lyme Regis, and Bridport. In May 2001, the route was changed east of Bridport to instead serve Abbotsbury and Weymouth. In May 2003, the frequency of the route was increased to two-hourly, the Sunday service became year-round, and some summer services were extended beyond Weymouth to Wareham.

In April 2004, the route was branded as CoastLinX53. The following month, the route was extended to Poole, with some buses continuing to Bournemouth. While the existing service was council-funded, the extensions to Poole and Bournemouth were operated on a commercial basis. However, the Bournemouth extensions were cut in April 2008.

After fifteen years of financial support from Devon County Council and Dorset County Council, in March 2013 the route began being operated entirely on a commercial basis for the first time. A new livery was launched, together with the Jurassic Coaster branding. By the following year, the route was running at an hourly frequency between Lyme Regis and Weymouth.

=== Split-up of the X53 and rebranding by First Wessex ===
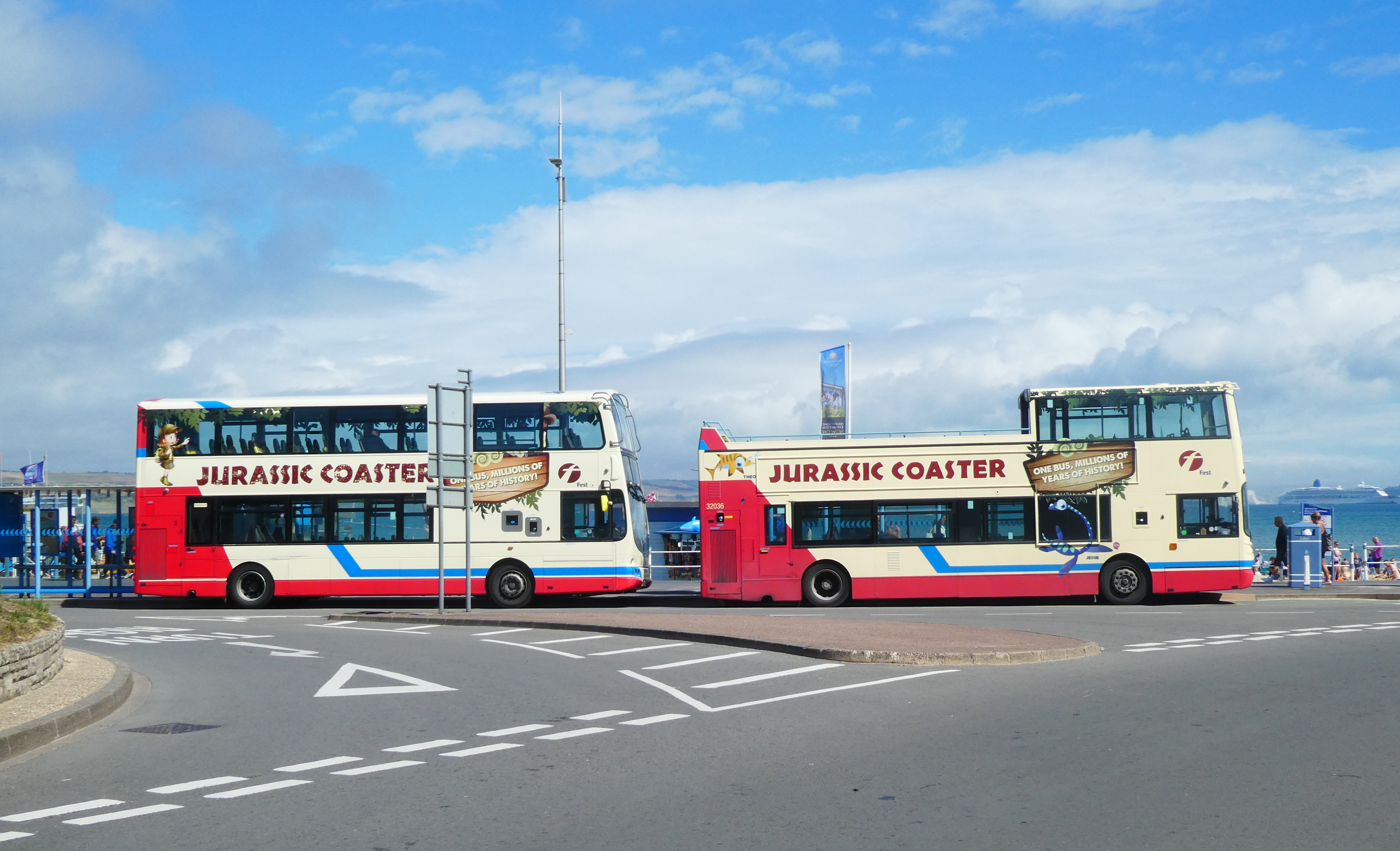
Open and closed top Jurassic Coaster buses parked at Weymouth

In 2016, the X53 was split into multiple routes, with the X53 itself being shortened to only run between Axminster and Weymouth. Two new services were introduced numbered X52 and X54. The X52 ran between Exeter and Lyme Regis, avoiding Axminster, while the X54 ran between Weymouth and Poole. The X52 service was reduced in frequency, and withdrawn in 2018, marking the end of First bus services in Exeter.

=== During the COVID-19 pandemic ===
Sunday services were cancelled during the COVID-19 pandemic, but were reinstated in July 2020. The Sunday service continued to run during the winter, unlike in previous years.

In 2021, the logo and livery for the routes was updated. Route 501 was brought into the network with "Portland Coaster" branded open top buses and the X52 number was relaunched and reworked for a new route running between Bridport and Monkey World.

== Routes ==
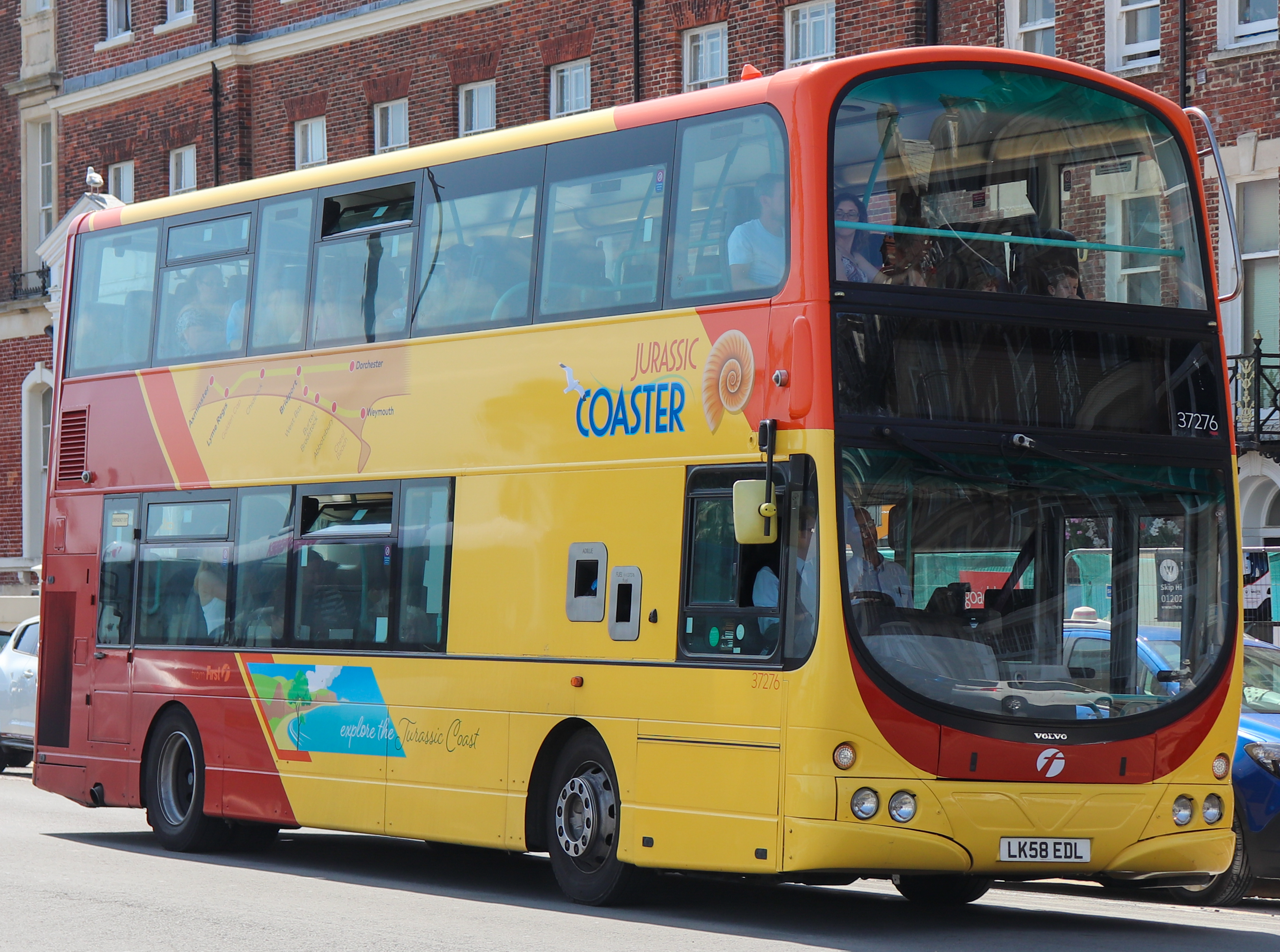
A Jurassic Coaster Volvo B9TL Wright Eclipse Gemini in Weymouth

The Jurassic Coaster network is formed of six routes, stretching from Axminster in the west, through Weymouth to Swanage in the east. Each of the six routes generally run to a two-hourly frequency.

=== Route X50 ===
Route X50 operates between Weymouth and Swanage via Preston, Osmington, Lulworth Cove, Wool, Bovington, Wareham and Corfe Castle.

The route is operated using a mixture of Wright Eclipse Gemini and Plaxton President open-top buses. The route operates during the summer months (between May and September) only.

=== Route X51 ===
Route X51 operates between Weymouth and Axminster via Dorchester, Poundbury, Winterbourne Abbas, Bridport, Charmouth and Lyme Regis.

The route is operated using a mixture of Wright Eclipse Gemini 2, Alexander Dennis Enviro400 and Alexander Dennis Enviro400 MMC closed top buses. The route runs throughout the year, although the Sunday service does not operate during the winter months.

=== Route X52 ===
Route X52 operates between Weymouth and Bridport via Chickerell, Abbotsbury, Swyre, Burton Bradstock and West Bay.

The route is operated using a mixture of Wright Eclipse Gemini and Plaxton President open-top buses. The route operates during the summer months (between May and September) only.

=== Route X53 ===
Route X53 is the original Jurassic Coaster service and operates between Weymouth and Bridport via Chickerell, Abbotsbury, Swyre, Burton Bradstock, West Bay, Bridport, Charmouth and Lyme Regis.

The route is operated using a mixture of Wright Eclipse Gemini 2, Alexander Dennis Enviro400 and Alexander Dennis Enviro400 MMC closed top buses. The route runs daily throughout the year.

=== Route X54 ===
Route X54 operates between Weymouth and Wareham via Preston, Osmington, Lulworth Cove and Wool.

The route is operated using a mixture of Wright Eclipse Gemini 2, Alexander Dennis Enviro400 and Alexander Dennis Enviro400 MMC closed top buses. The route runs throughout the year, although the weekend service does not operate during the winter months.

=== Route 501 ===
"Portland Coaster" logo branding for route 501

Route 501 is branded as The Portland Coaster and operates between Weymouth and Portland Bill via Wyke Regis, Fortuneswell, Easton and Southwell.

The route is operated using open-top Alexander ALX400 buses. The route operates during the summer months (between May and September) only.

== Vehicles ==
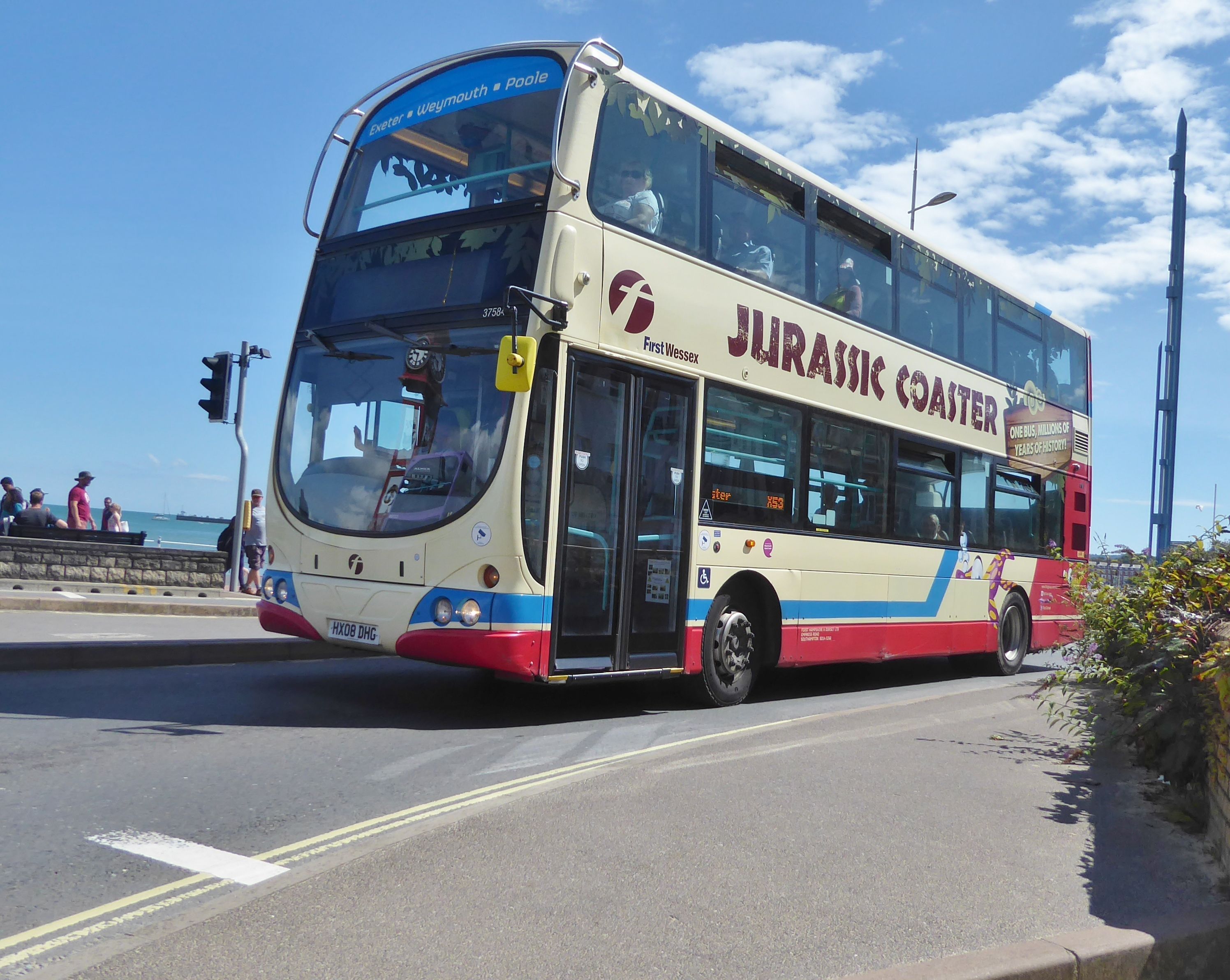
Jurassic Coaster X53 service in 2017

When the original X53 was introduced in November 1998 by Southern National, the route was operated with three Plaxton Paramount coaches.

After the takeover of the company the same year and the rebranding of the route in 2004, the route was served with Wright Eclipse Gemini bodied Volvos for the Coastlinx53. In May 2021, the route network and livery was revised and modified open top Transbus ALX400s and Wright Eclipse Geminis as well as closed top Enviro400s were put into its colours and used on the network.

== See also ==
- List of bus operators of the United Kingdom
