= Chalton =

Chalton may refer to:

- Chalton, Bedfordshire, England
- Chalton, Hampshire, England

== See also ==
- Charlton (disambiguation)
