= Charleston metropolitan area =

Charleston metropolitan area may refer to:

- Charleston, Illinois micropolitan area, United States
- Charleston, South Carolina metropolitan area, United States
- Charleston, West Virginia metropolitan area, United States

== See also ==
- Charleston (disambiguation)
