= Charles Towne =

Charles Towne may refer to:

- Charles Towne (artist) (1763–1840), English landscape and animal painter
- Charles A. Towne (1858–1928), American politician
- Charles Hanson Towne (1877–1949), American author, poet and editor, who wrote "The Harvest of the Sea" about the RMS Titanic
- Charles Towne, North Carolina, early North Carolina colony in the 1660s

== See also ==
- Charles H. Townes (1915–2015), American physicist and educator
- Charles Towne Landing
- Charles Town (disambiguation)
- Charlestown (disambiguation)
