= Bennetts Water Gardens =

Garden in Dorset, England

Coordinates: 50.6171°N 2.4962°W

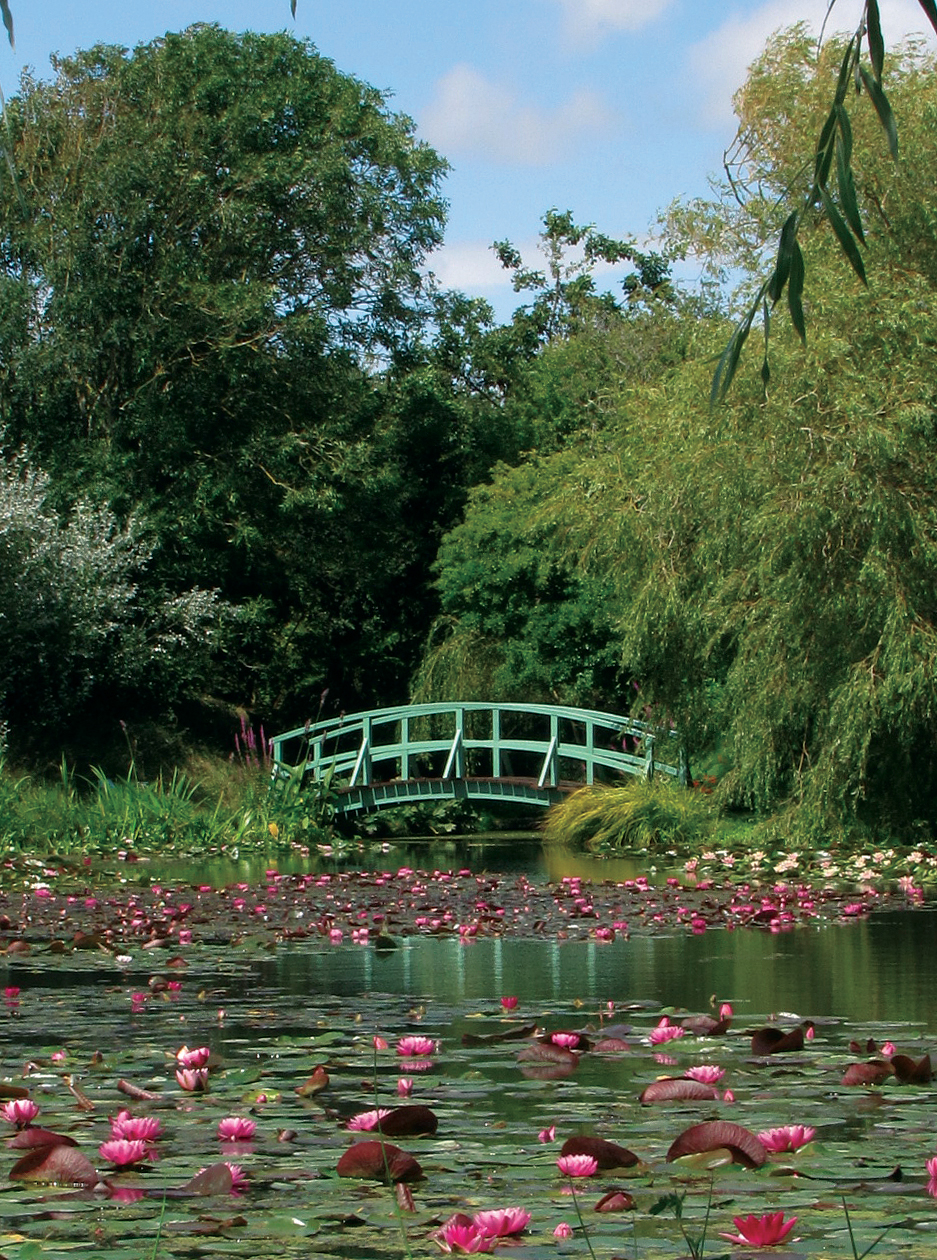
The Monet Bridge at Bennetts Water Gardens

Bennetts Water Gardens is an 8-acre (32,000 m^{2}) garden in Chickerell, near Weymouth, Dorset, in southern England. It holds national and international collections of water lilies which flower from late May through to September. The plants are displayed in a series of ponds and lakes. A feature of the garden is a blue Japanese bridge built in 1999 to celebrate 100 years since Claude Monet painted his famous piece Water Lily Pond 1899.

The garden was created by the Bennett family who still run it today. The site was originally a clay pit as far back as 1859; Oxford Clay was dug by hand from the ground for brickmaking. Today a museum on the site details this local history, including Chickerell village, which is mentioned in the Domesday Book; Chesil Beach; and The Fleet lagoon.

The collection of Nymphaea (Water Lily) is accredited with Plant Heritage as a National Plant Collection.https://youtu.be/yi_ZTqA_Tt8

== In media ==
- Gardeners' World. Episode 19, 2012, BBC2. First broadcast 17 Aug 2012
