= Burton Bradstock =

Village in Dorset, England

Coordinates: 50.7034°N 2.7268°W

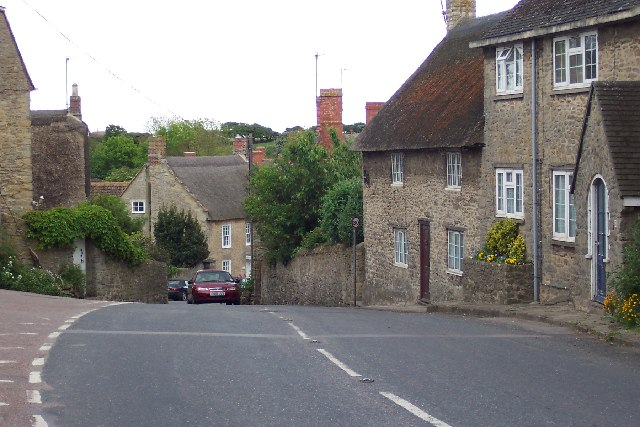
- High Street, Burton Bradstock

- Location within Dorset
- Population: 948 (2011)
- OS grid reference: SY4889
  - London: 145 miles (233 km) ENE
- Civil parish: Burton Bradstock
- Unitary authority: Dorset
- Ceremonial county: Dorset
- Region: South West
- Country: England
- Sovereign state: United Kingdom
- Post town: Bridport
- Postcode district: DT6
- Dialling code: 01308
- Police: Dorset
- Fire: Dorset and Wiltshire
- Ambulance: South Western
- UK Parliament: West Dorset
- Website: Village website

Burton Bradstock is a village and civil parish in Dorset, England, approximately 2 1/2 miles (4 km) southeast of Bridport and 1/2 mile (0.8 km) inland from the English Channel at Chesil Beach. In the 2011 census the parish had a population of 948. The village lies in the Bride Valley, close to the mouth of the small River Bride. It comprises 16th- and 17th-century thatched cottages, a parish church (dedicated to St Mary the Virgin), two pubs, a primary school, shop, post office stores, beach café, hotel, garage, village hall, reading room a library. The parish has a National Coastwatch Institution station, Lyme Bay Station.

== History ==
The place was first recorded in the Domesday Book of 1086 as Bridetone, it had 28 households and the lord of the manor was the Abbey of Saint-Wandrille. The toponym means the place (Old English tūn) on the River Bride, and therefore has a different origin from most places named "Burton", including Burton, Dorset.

In 1286 land in the village was acquired by Bradenstoke Priory in Wiltshire. Bradenstoke, sometimes pronounced Bradstock, gave its name to the suffix "Bradstock".

The local parish church of St Mary dates largely from the late 14th or early 15th century, though a Victorian restoration in 1897 made significant alterations. 950 yards south-east of the church is the Bronze Age burial mound of Bind Barrow, it is 64 feet (19.5 m) in diameter and 5 feet (1.52 m) high, it was scheduled as an ancient monument in 1959.

The cliffs were used for training before the Normandy landings in 1943.

== Geography ==
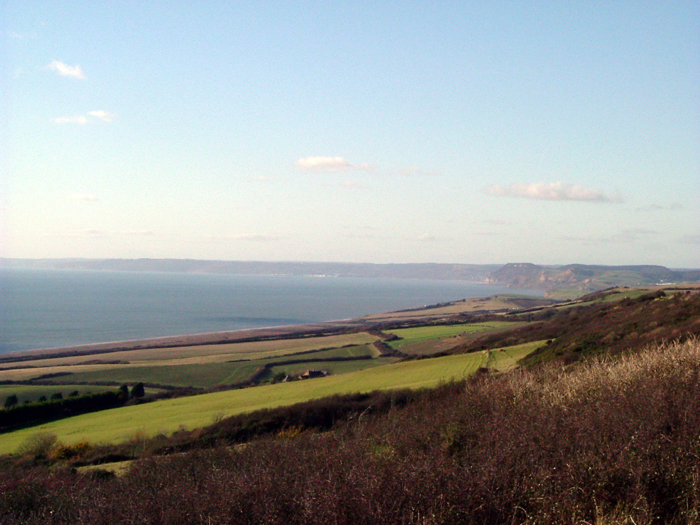
Lyme Bay from the parish: including the Golden Cap and parts of East Devon

Burton Bradstock lies on Dorset's Jurassic Coast, which in the vicinity of the village comprises vertical cliffs up to 150 feet (45 m) high. Near the top of these cliffs is a layer of Inferior Oolite, which contains large ammonites. Rockfalls result in these being accessible to fossil hunters on the beach beneath. At Hive Beach there is a gap in the cliffs; the National Trust owns the land here and provide a car park. There is a yearly Spring Tide Festival on the beach.

== Governance ==
For elections to Dorset Council, the village is in Chesil Bank ward. For elections to parliament, it is in West Dorset constituency.

== Transport ==
The village has a frequent local bus service to Bridport via West Bay, and is also served by the X53 coastal bus service which runs east to Weymouth, Wareham and Poole and west to Bridport, Lyme Regis, Seaton and Exeter. The village has several local footpaths including one to the beach and the coastpath to West Bay.

== Famous residents ==
The musician Billy Bragg lived in the village from 1999 until 2021.
