= Charlottetown (disambiguation) =

Charlottetown is the capital city of Prince Edward Island in Canada.

Charlottetown may also refer to:

== Communities ==
In Canada

- Charlottetown, Labrador, Newfoundland and Labrador, a town in Labrador
- Charlottetown, Newfoundland, Newfoundland and Labrador, an unincorporated community in Newfoundland

== Electoral districts ==
In Canada

- Charlottetown (electoral district), a federal electoral district in Prince Edward Island
- Charlottetown-Brighton, a provincial electoral district in Prince Edward Island
- Charlottetown-Victoria Park, a provincial electoral district in Prince Edward Island

== Other uses ==
- Hotel Charlottetown, one of Canada's railway hotels
- Charlottetown Mall in Charlotte, North Carolina, the first enclosed mall in the southern United States
- HMCS Charlottetown, the name used for three different Canadian warships
- Charlottetown Conference, 1864 gathering marking the beginning of the Canadian confederation
- Charlottetown Accord, a package of constitutional amendments, proposed by the Canadian federal and provincial governments in 1992
- Charlottetown (soil series), a deep fine sandy loam soil

== See also ==
- Charlotte (disambiguation)
