= Charleston (restaurant) =

Restaurant in Baltimore, Maryland

Coordinates: 39°16′57.2″N 76°35′59.8″W

Charleston is a restaurant located in Baltimore, Maryland serving Low Country cuisine.

== History ==
Co-owners Cindy Wolf and Tony Foreman opened Charleston in 1997; it is located on Lancaster St. in Baltimore's waterfront Harbor East district. In 2005 they renovated the restaurant, revamped the menu and changed to a pay-by-the-course system.

== Menu ==
The restaurant focusses on a tasting menu of three to six courses selected by diners from the dozens on offer in a prix-fixe format. The menu changes depending on availability and seasonality. The prix-fixe format includes optional wine pairings; Wolf is known for her expertise. Seafood in Lowcountry preparations is a focus. A curried lobster bisque is the restaurant's most popular dish.

== Ownership ==
The restaurant is co-owned by Wolf and Foreman, her former husband. Wolf, a native of North Carolina who spent time living in Charleston, South Carolina, is the executive chef.

== Recognition ==
Wolf is a nine times nominated James Beard Award for Best Chef in the Mid-Atlantic, as of 2021 a tie for the record of a chef who hasn't won. The Washington Post's Tom Sietsema said her offerings were "some of the finest cooking in the Mid-Atlantic" and named the restaurant to his Hall of Fame. Forbes named it to their list of 100 best restaurants in the United States. According to the New York Times Wolf and Charleston "helped spur the explosion of innovative New Southern cooking in the 2000s".
