= Charleston High School =

Charleston High School may refer to:

- Charleston High School (Missouri)
- Charleston High School (Mississippi)
- Charleston High School (West Virginia), a high school in West Virginia's capital city that closed in 1989
- Charleston High School (Illinois)
- Charleston High School (Arkansas)
- Charleston High School, a former high school in Charleston, Tennessee, replaced by Walker Valley High School.

== See also ==
- Charlestown High School, Charlestown, Boston, Massachusetts
