= Historic Charlton Park =

Historically oriented local facility and museum in Barry County, Michigan

Coordinates: 42.621°N 85.2033°W

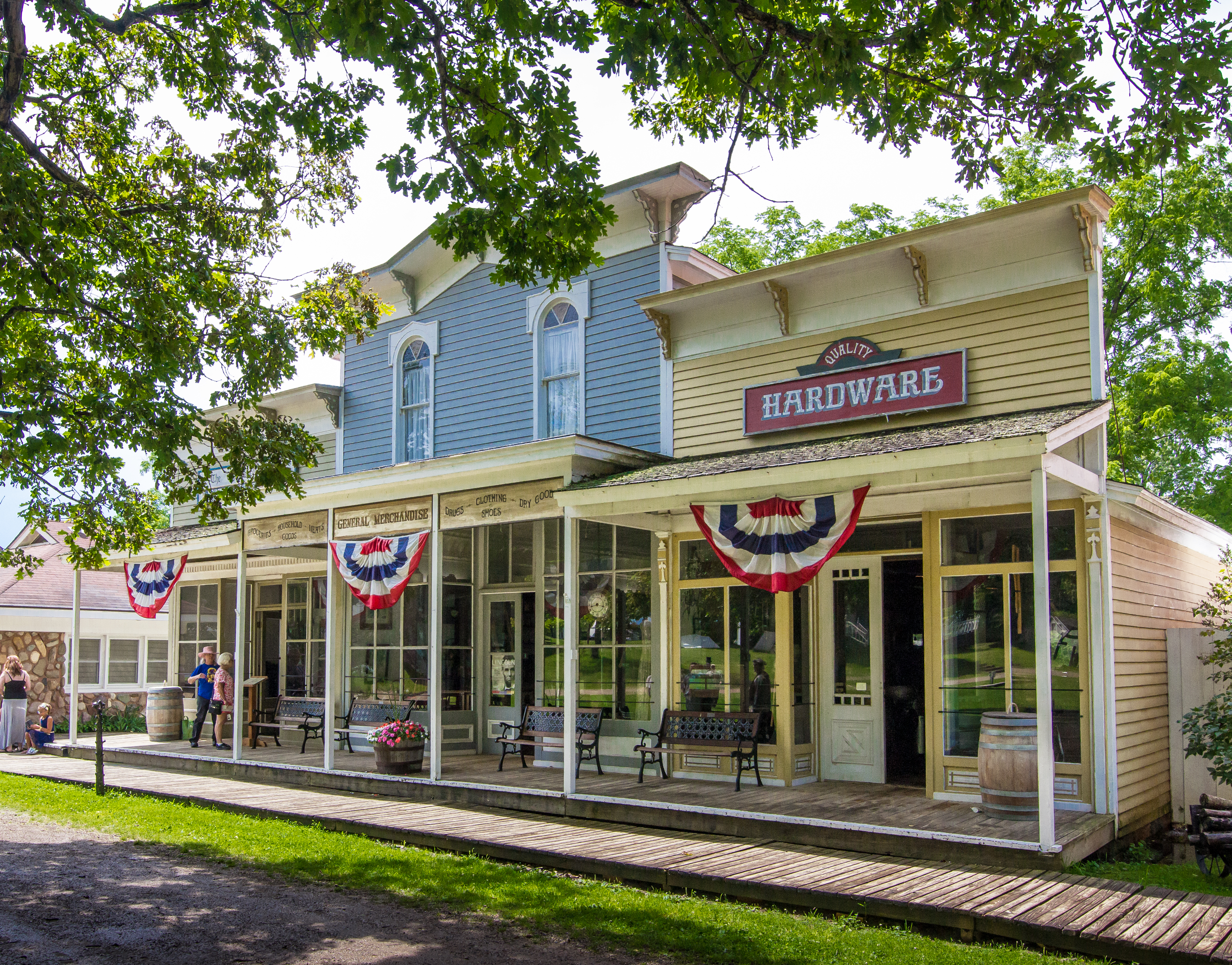
Main Street at Charlton Park

Historic Charlton Park is a historically oriented local facility and museum in Barry County, Michigan that sits on 310 acres (1.3 km^{2}) along the Thornapple River.

The village is made up of a number of nineteenth and early-twentieth century structures brought together from around the county to recreate a Michigan village from the turn of the 20th century. Buildings include a lawyer's home, blacksmith shop, bank and insurance office, barber shop, inn and stagecoach stop, Church, carpenter/cooper shop, carriage house, general store, hardware store, school, printshop, cabin, sawmill, and the Hastings Town Hall.

Besides the historic village and museum, there is a swimming beach on the Thornapple River, along which the park is located.

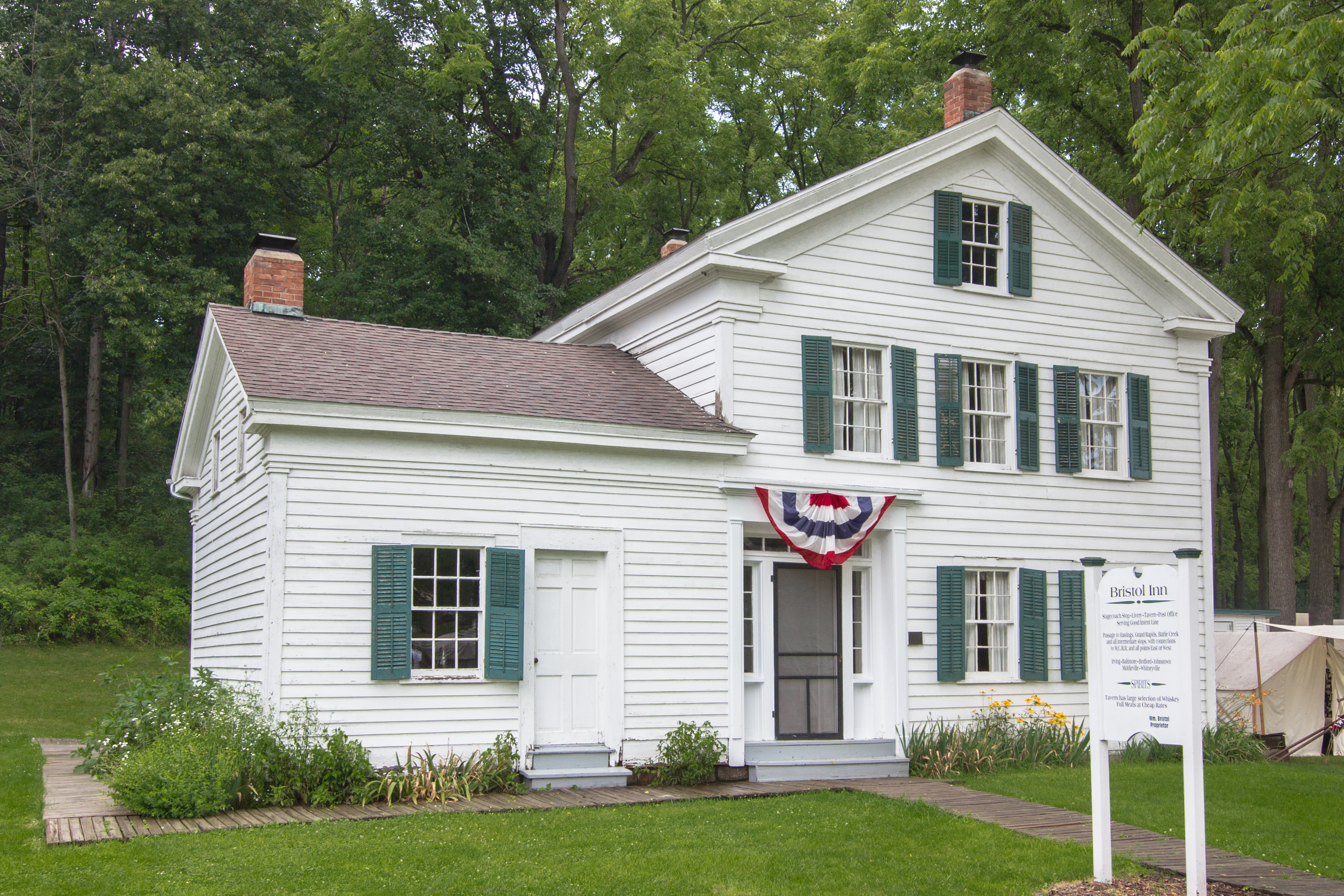
Built in 1848. Was used as a stagecoach stop.

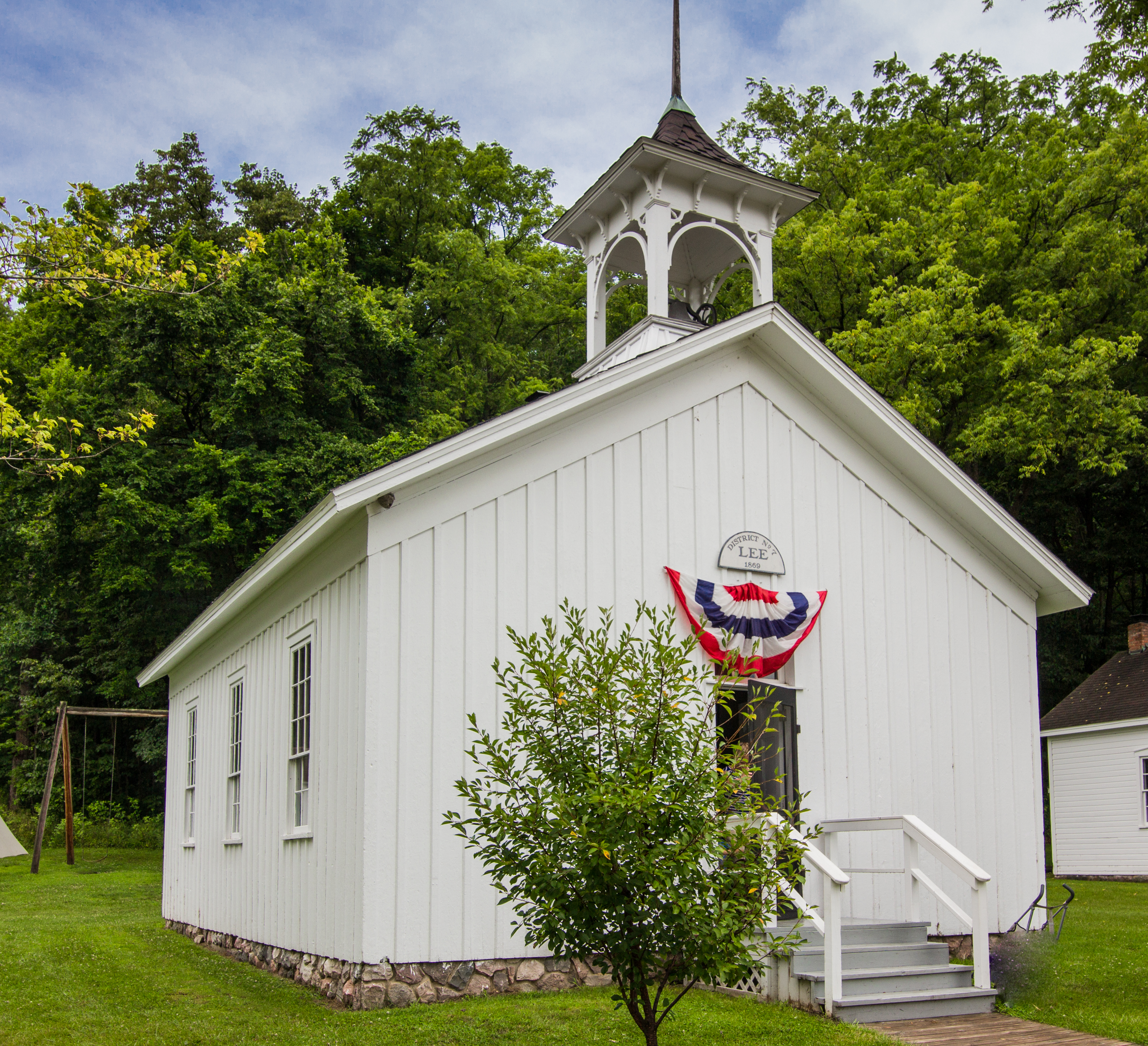
Built in 1869. Children attended the Lee School until 1923.

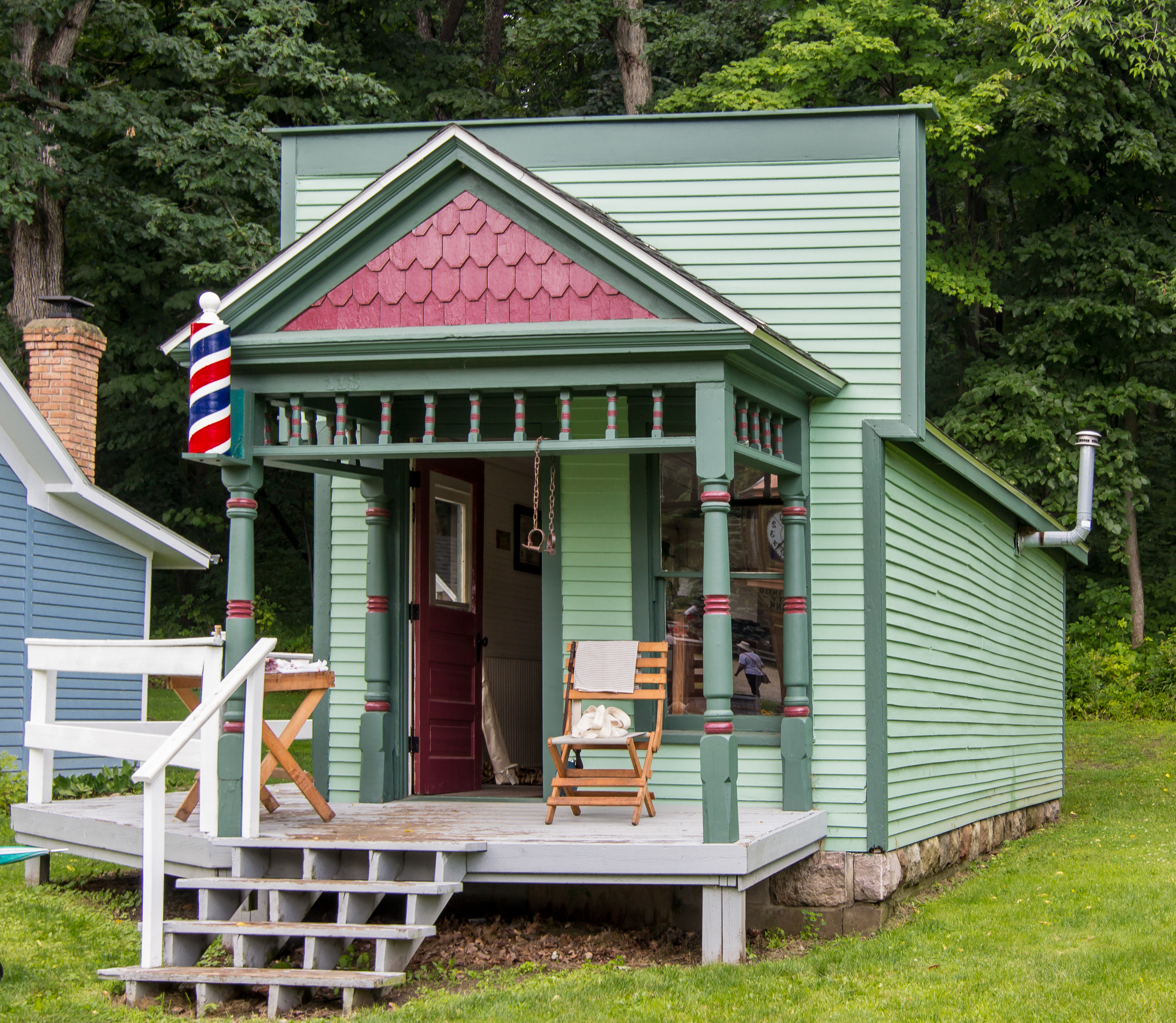
Barber Shop built between 1889-1907.

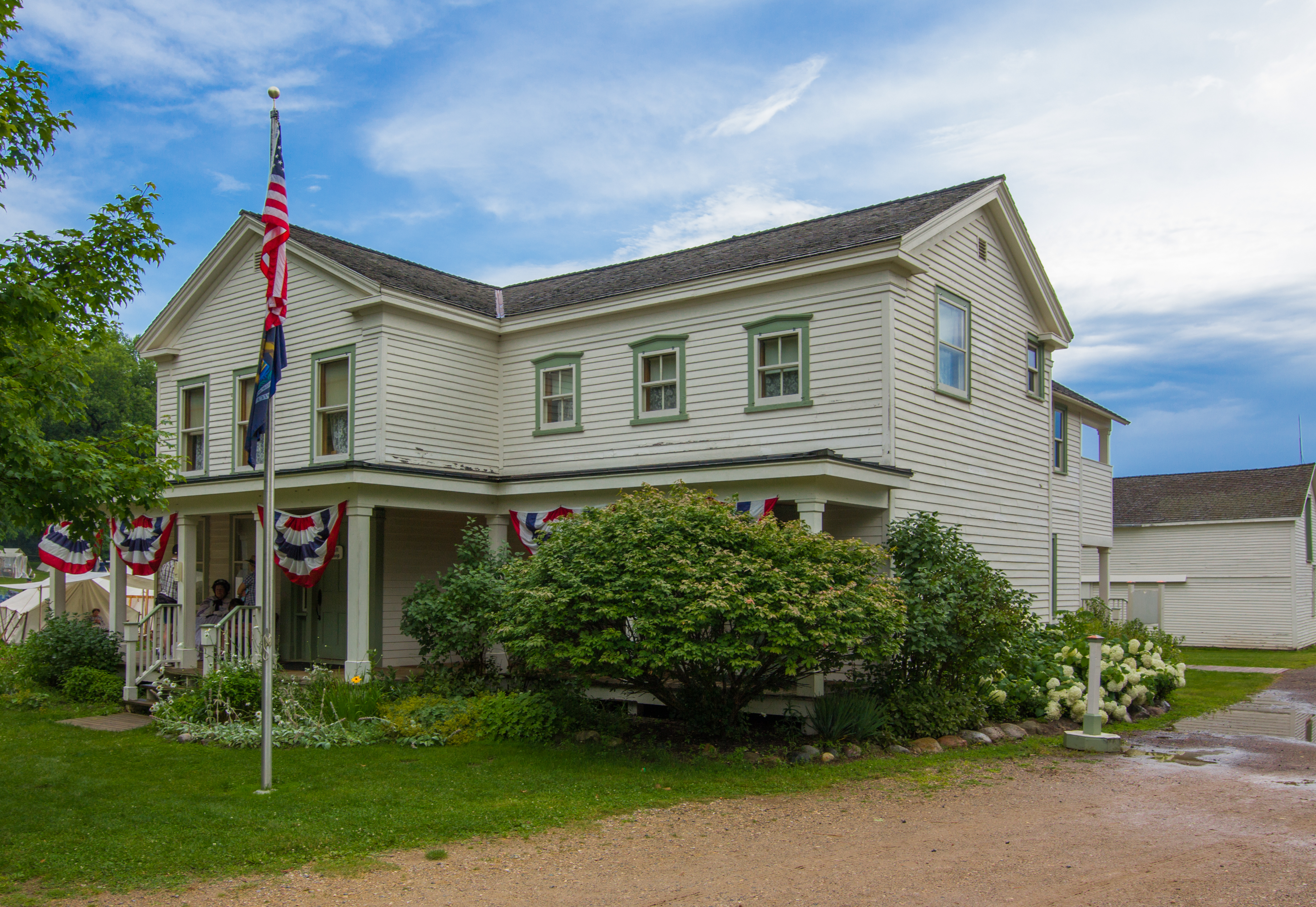
Constructed in 1852. William E. Upjohn started the Upjohn Pharmaceutical Co.

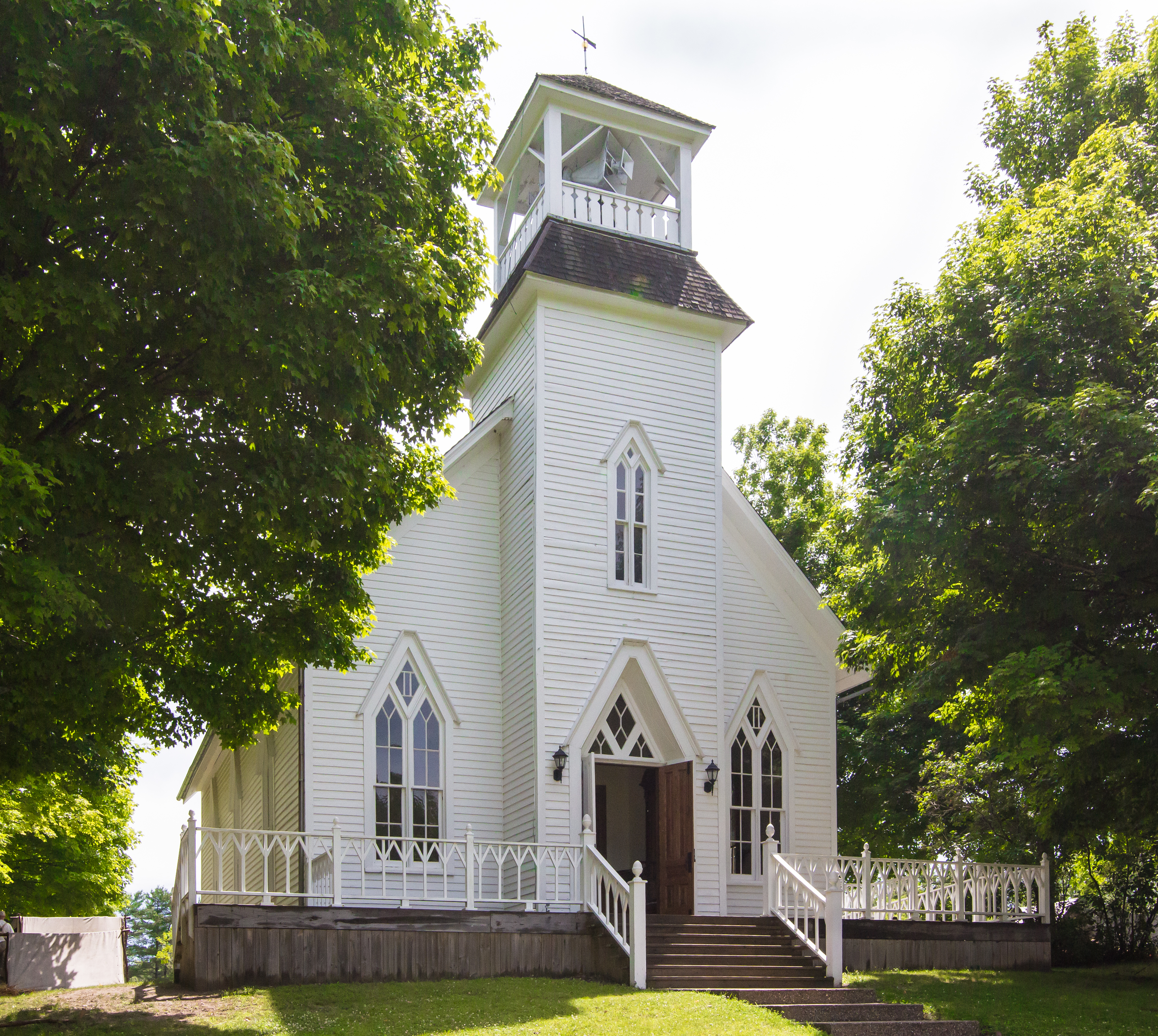
Carlton Center Church built in 1885.

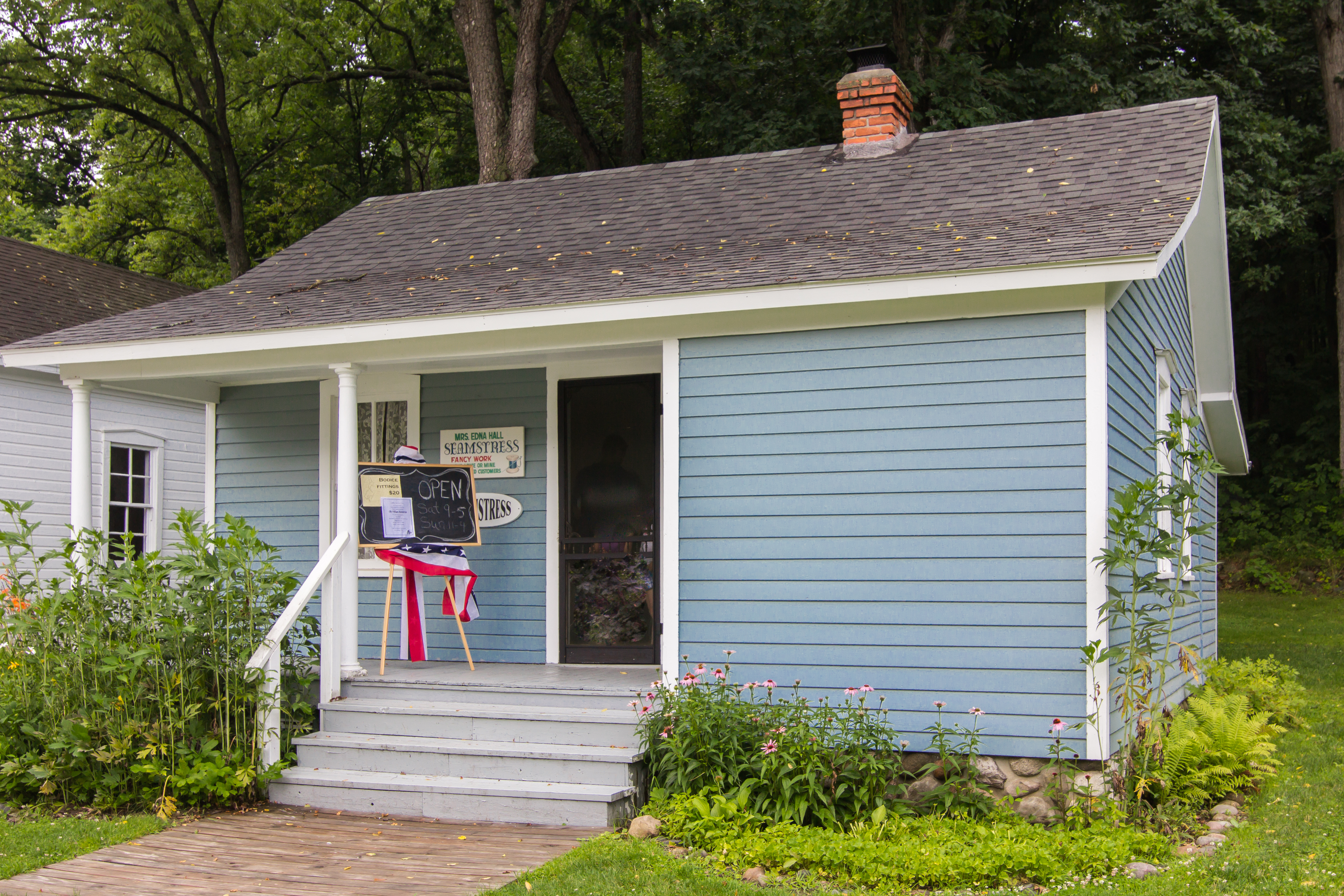
Built in the late 1880s. This house is the home of the village seamstress.

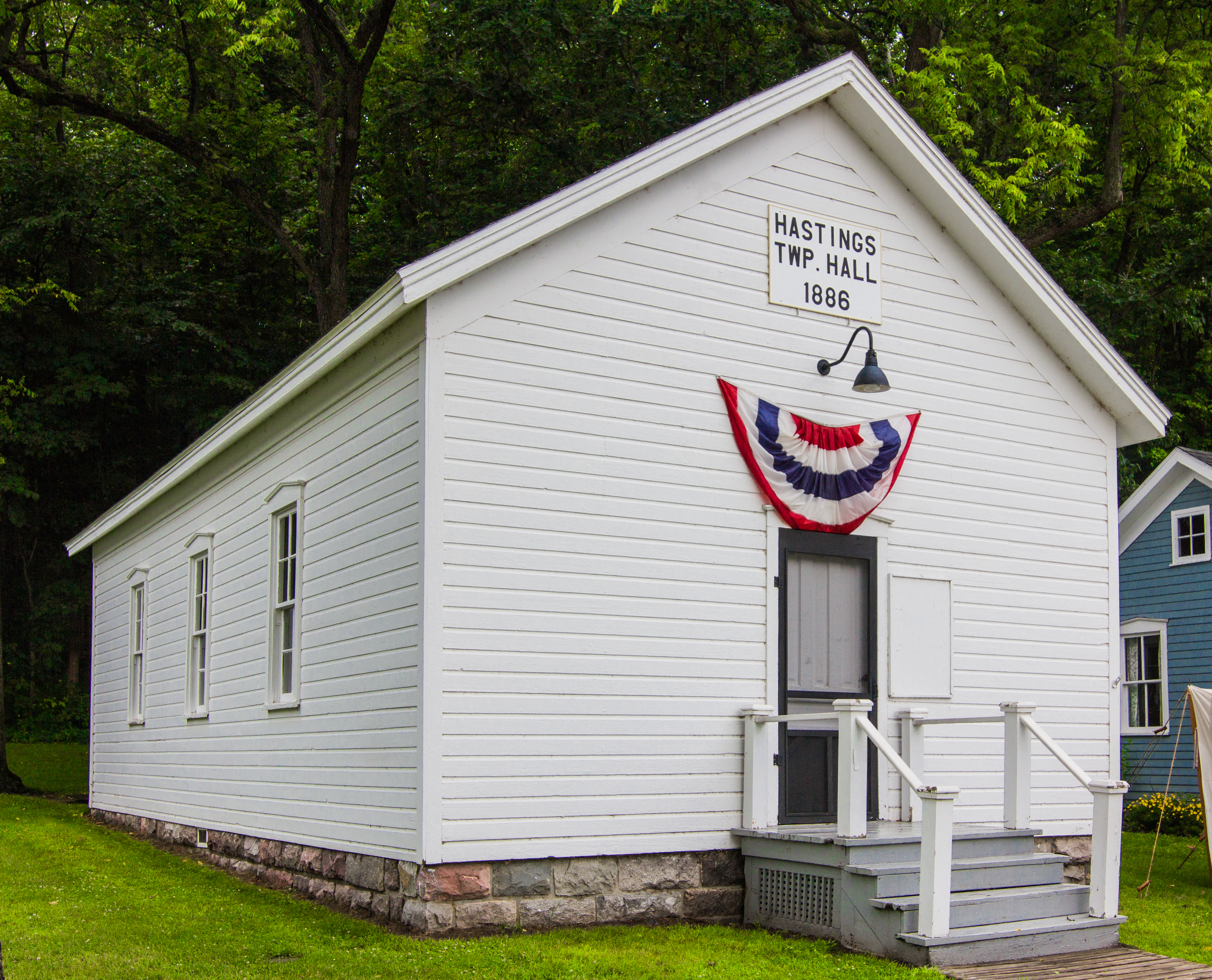
Hastings Township Hall in use until 1988.

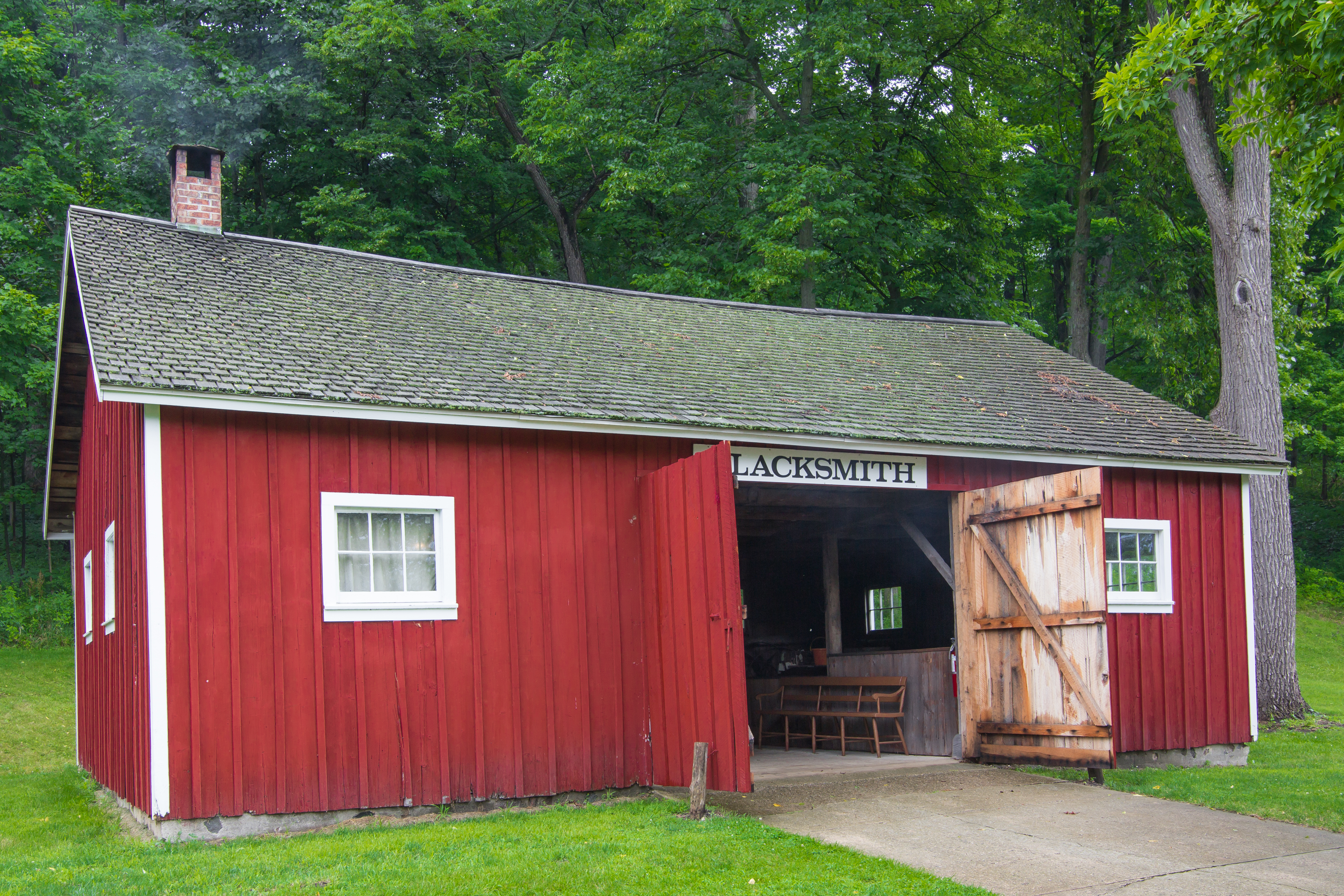
Blacksmith Shop donated in 1968.

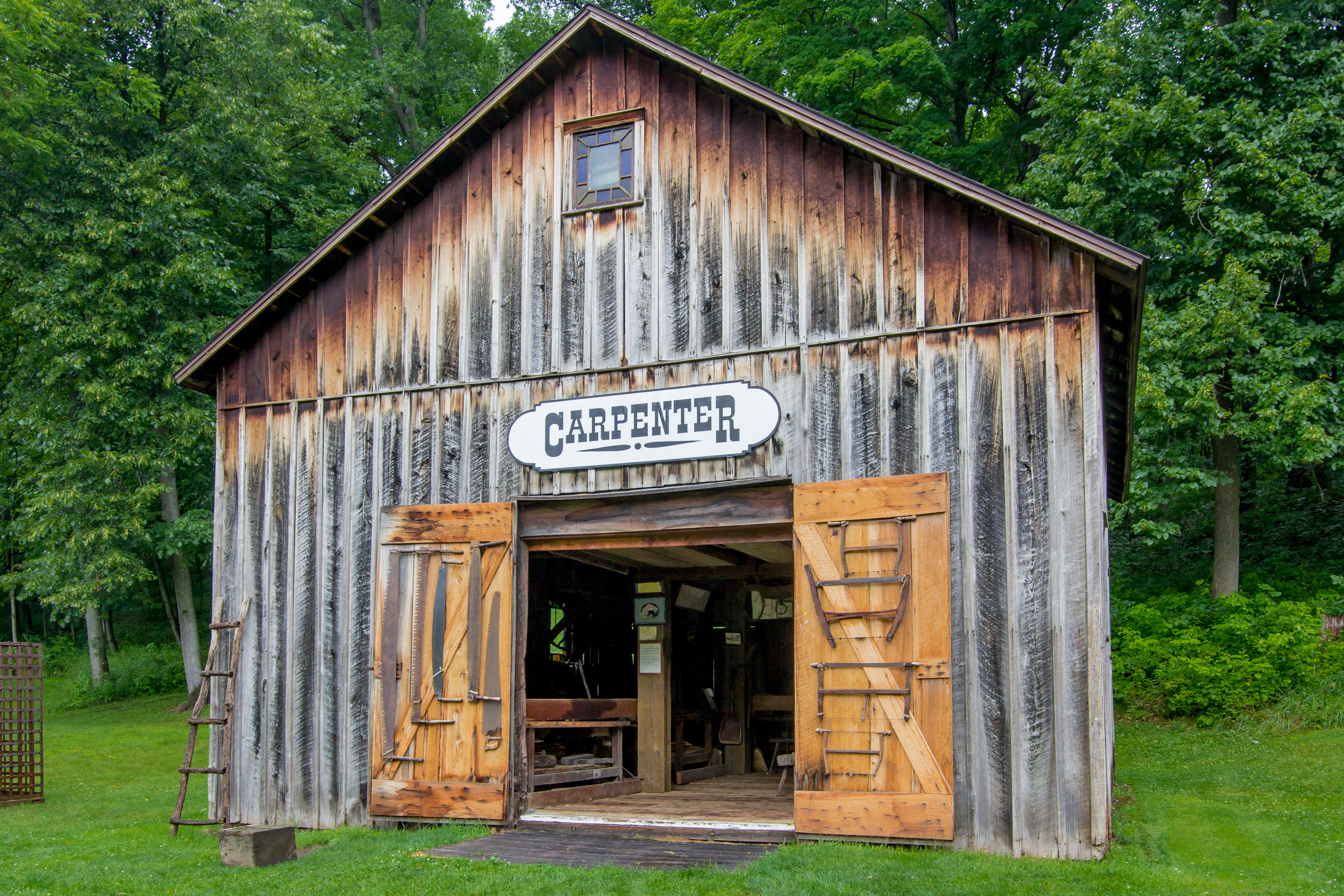
Carpenter Shop

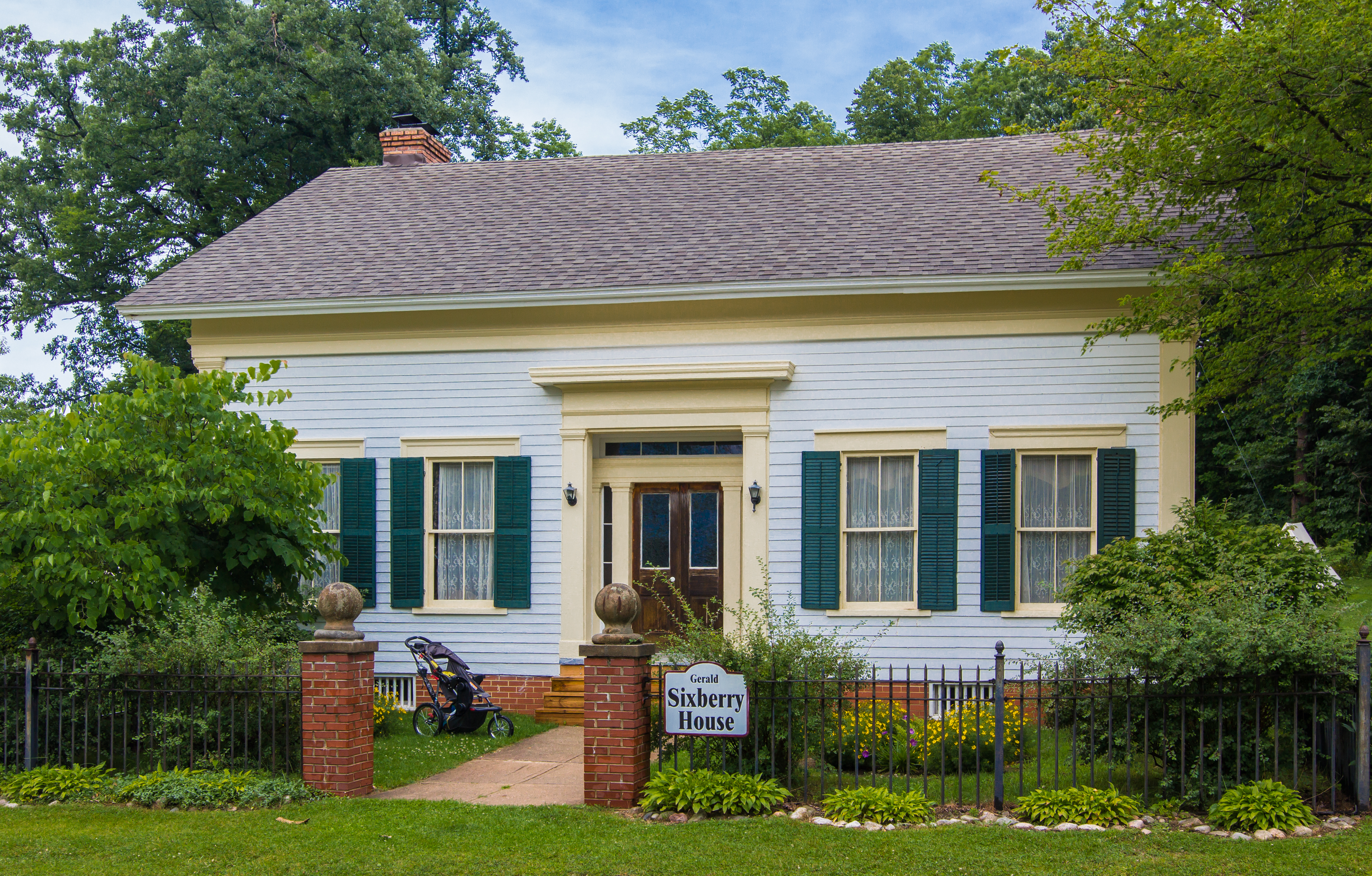
Built by John and Rachel Dillon in Maple Grove in 1858.

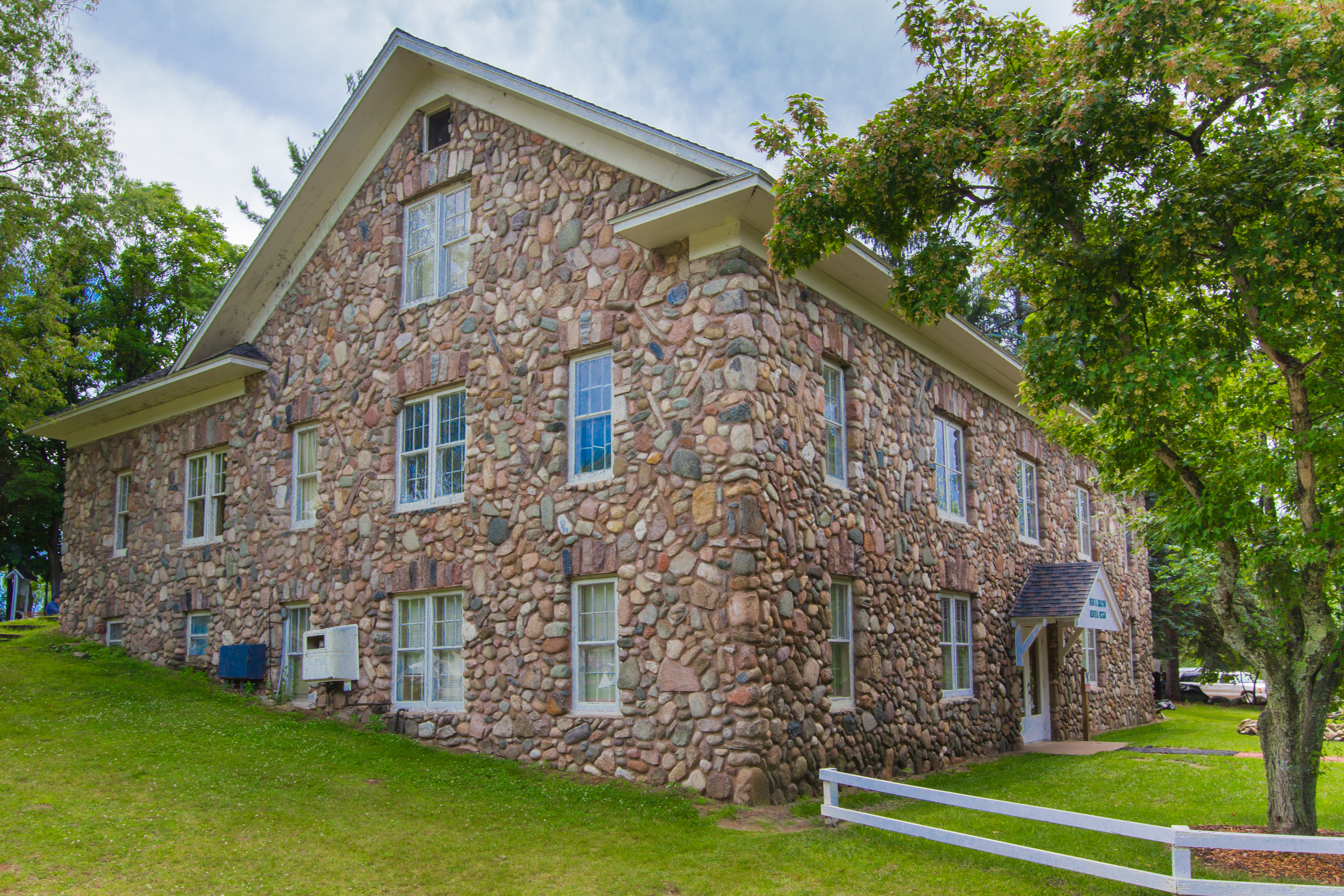
Built by Irving Charlton in 1950.

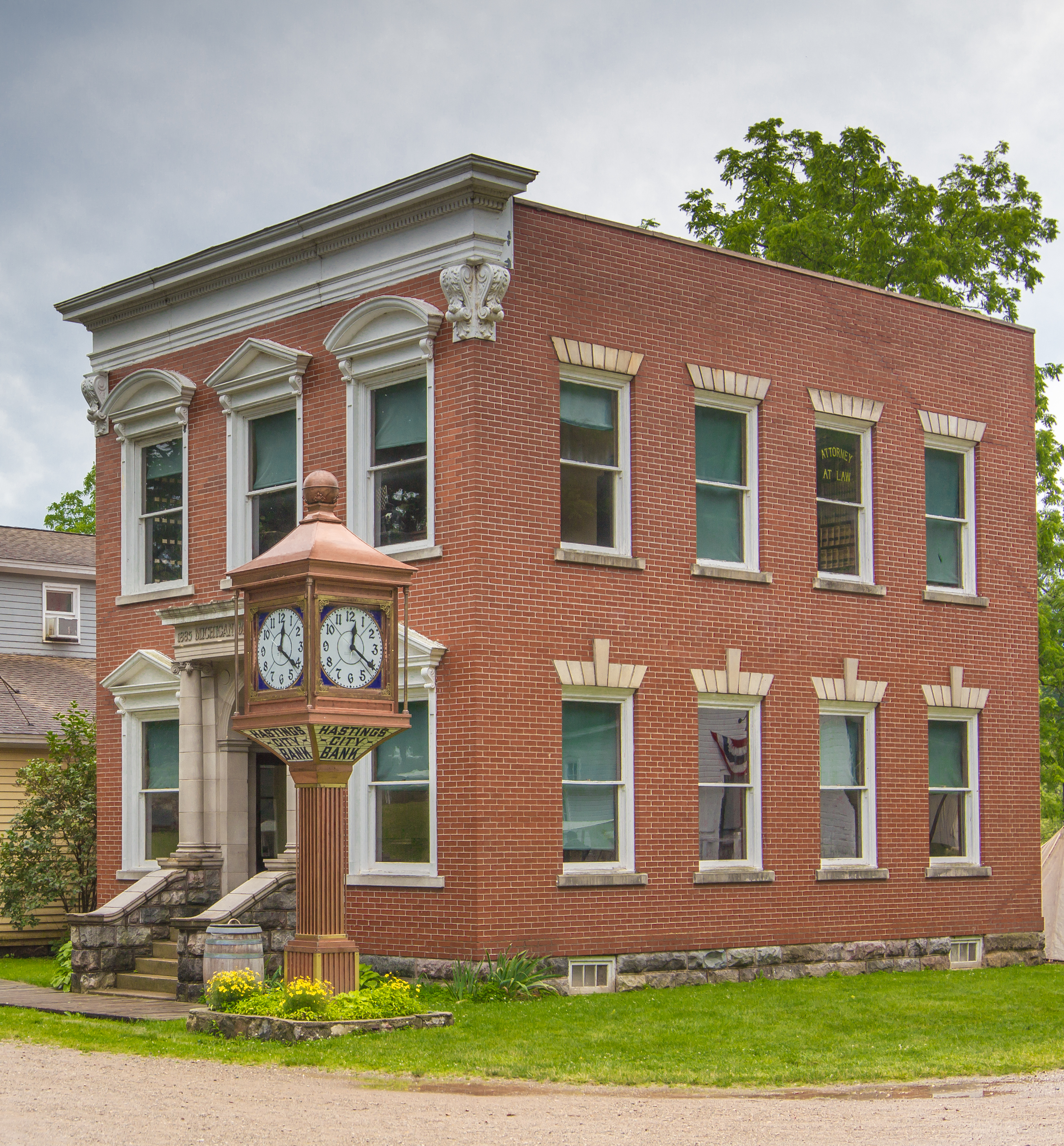
Hastings Mutual Insurance Co. operated in this building from 1908-1924.
