= Charles Town (cricketer) =

English cricketer

Charles Town (born 1796 at Sutton Valence, Kent; died 31 July 1845 at Sandgate, Folkestone, Kent) was an English amateur cricketer who played from 1815 to 1823. Mainly associated with Kent, he made three known appearances in important matches.

== Bibliography ==
- Carlaw, Derek (2020). Kent County Cricketers, A to Z: Part One (1806–1914) (PDF). Cardiff: ACS.
