= Charter Alley =

Village in Hampshire, England

Coordinates: 51.3133°N 1.1467°W

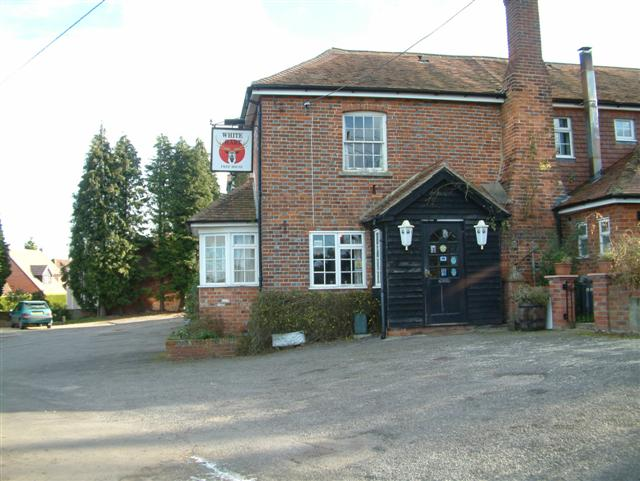
- The White Hart, Charter Alley.

- Location within Hampshire
- District: Basingstoke and Deane
- Shire county: Hampshire
- Region: South East
- Country: England
- Sovereign state: United Kingdom
- Police: Hampshire and Isle of Wight
- Fire: Hampshire and Isle of Wight
- Ambulance: South Central
- UK Parliament: North West Hampshire

Charter Alley is a village in north east Hampshire, England. According to the Post Office the majority of the population at the 2011 Census was included in the civil parish of Wootton St Lawrence. The village was originally known as West Sherbourne and then Charter Ley before becoming Charter Alley.
