= Charleston, New Hampshire =

Mining settlement in Piermont and Warren, New Hampshire

Charleston was a small mining and farming village north and east of Lake Tarleton between Warren and Piermont, New Hampshire. It was abandoned in 1874 and its factory was sold to the Pike Whetstone Company a decade later.

== History ==
In 1791, the town of Warren constructed a road on the east side of Lake Tarleton, and the community gained a school in 1795. The village grew to support two mills along Eastman Brook, and a bobbin mill. The Cross Iron Mine was located in Charleston. The village of Charleston is mentioned in two state-conducted geological surveys: one by Charles Jackson in 1844, and the other by C.H. Hitchcock in 1874.

Charles Jackson remarked that 100 tons of iron ore had been extracted from the Cross Iron Mine. In 1874, when Hitchcock conducted his survey, Charleston had seemingly been abandoned. Charleston not only supported mills and an iron mine, but also a factory and a whetstone quarry. The factory supplied the Pile Whetstone Company with raw materials. The company purchased the factory in 1884, which in 1874 had been operated by Charles Dodge. Today, only a cemetery and cellar holes remain in Charleston.

== Geography ==
Charleston was located north and east of Lake Tarleton, on the border between Piermont and Warren. It was situated along Lake Tarleton Road, which today runs along the west shore of the lake. The Charlestown Road Snowmobile Trail on the lake's east side is presumably named for the historic village. Nearby areas include Wachipauka Pond, Lake Katherine, Lake Armington, and Piermont Mountain The Appalachian Trail runs along the ridge to the east of the village site.

== Notes ==
• Charleston is not to be confused with Charlestown, a thriving town in Sullivan County along the Connecticut River.
