= Charleston (Den Harrow song) =

1986 single by Den Harrow

Single by Den Harrow

from the album Overpower
- B-side: "Broken Radio"; "Bad Boy"
- Released: 1986
- Genre: Italo disco
- Length: 4:49 (album version); 4:10 (single version)
- Label: Baby
- Songwriter(s): Roberto Turatti; Miki Chieregato; H.T. Beecher
- Producer(s): Roberto Turatti; Miki Chieregato

Den Harrow singles chronology
"Overpower" (1986)	"Charleston" (1986)	"Catch the Fox" (1986)

Audio
- "Charleston" on YouTube

"Charleston" is a song by Italian singer Den Harrow from his debut studio album, Overpower (1985).

== Track listing and formats ==
- Italian 7-inch single

A. "Charleston" – 4:00
B. "Broken Radio" – 4:10

- Italian 12-inch single

A. "Charleston" – 7:11
B. "Bad Boy" (Remix) – 9:18

== Charts ==
Weekly chart performance for "Charleston"
Chart (1986)	Peak position
France (SNEP)	27
Italy (Musica e dischi)	22
Switzerland (Schweizer Hitparade)	17
West Germany (GfK)	18
