= Charlottetown (soil series) =

Type of loam soil

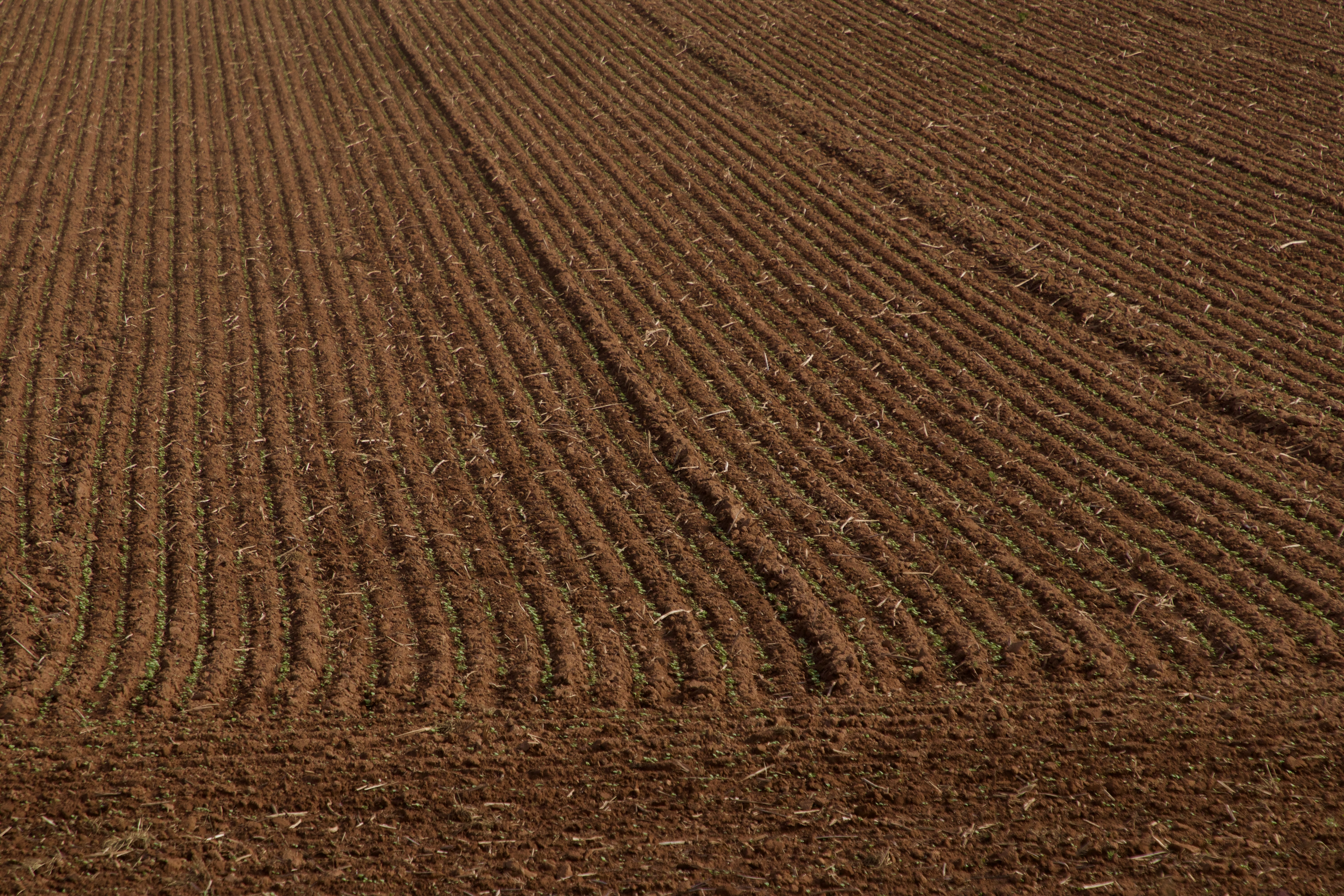
Typical red Charlottetown soil in cultivated rows, Prince Edward Island

Charlottetown soil series is the name given to a deep fine sandy loam soil which has developed under forest vegetation on glacial till which is derived from red beds dominated by arkosic sandstone. This series occurs only on Prince Edward Island, where it is widespread and so important for agriculture that it has been designated as the Provincial Soil.

This soil is an Orthic Humo-Ferric Podzol in the Canadian soil classification system. It has good moisture-holding capacity and is well drained. It warms quickly in the spring; this is an important virtue in a region where spring comes late. It is easy to work and is not excessively stony. Few other Podzols, or other Prince Edward Island soils, have the same desirable traits as the Charlottetown.

Like all Podzols, the Charlottetown is strongly acidic unless it is limed. It is largely used to grow potatoes, which depend on the Charlottetown's natural acidity to produce scab-free yields. It is also noted for its vivid red color for which Prince Edward Island is famous.
