= Chenhalls =

Coordinates: 50.169°N 5.431°W

Chenhalls: Cornish: Chi an Als
- Location within Cornwall
- OS grid reference: SW551356
- Unitary authority: Cornwall
- Ceremonial county: Cornwall
- Region: South West
- Country: England
- Sovereign state: United Kingdom
- Post town: HAYLE
- Postcode district: TR27
- Dialling code: 01736
- UK Parliament: St Ives

Chenhalls (Cornish: Chi an Als, meaning house of the cliff) is a hamlet in the parish of St Erth, Cornwall, England. It is situated about 0.5 miles (0.80 km) north-east of the village of St Erth. Chenhalls lies on the east bank of the river Hayle at about 3 metres (9.8 ft) above sea level.
