= Charlton (ship) =

Several ships have been named Charlton:

- Charlton (1803 ship) (or Charleton) was built in America. She first appeared in British-origin online records in 1803. She made three complete voyages as a whaler. She was on her fourth voyage when the U.S. Navy captured her. After her captors released her she returned to England and then disappears from easily accessible online records.
- Charlton (1798 EIC ship) was launched in Liverpool as an East Indiaman for the British East India Company (EIC). She made five voyages to India for the EIC. A French naval squadron captured her in 1809 on her sixth voyage and she became a prison ship at Mauritius until the Royal Navy recaptured her at the end of 1810. She became a country ship, trading east of the Cape of Good Hope, but was lost in the Red Sea in 1812.
