= USS Charleston =

USS Charleston may refer to:

- USS Charleston (1798), a galley in commission from 1798 to 1802
- USS Charleston (C-2), a protected cruiser commissioned in 1889 and wrecked in 1899
- USS Charleston (C-22), a protected cruiser in commission from 1905 to 1923
- USS Charleston (PG-51), a gunboat in commission from 1936 to 1946
- USS Charleston (LKA-113), an amphibious cargo ship in commission from 1968 to 1992
- USS Charleston (LCS-18), a littoral combat ship commissioned on March 2, 2019

== In fiction ==
- On the Beach (2000 film)
