= Charlton, New Zealand =

Locality on New Zealand's South Island

Coordinates: 46°9′S 168°55′E

Charlton is a locality in the eastern Southland region of New Zealand's South Island.

The population was 687 in the 2013 census. This was an increase of 99 people since the 2006 Census.
