= Charcott =

Village in Kent, England

Coordinates: 51.2032°N 0.1778°E

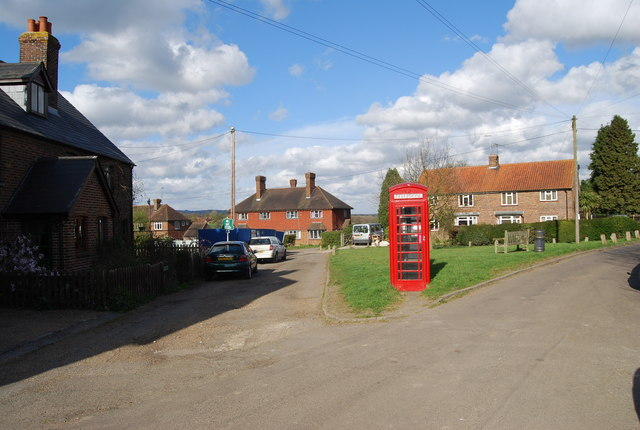

- Location within Kent
- Civil parish: Leigh
- District: Sevenoaks
- Shire county: Kent
- Region: South East
- Country: England
- Sovereign state: United Kingdom
- Post town: Tonbridge
- Postcode district: TN11
- Police: Kent
- Fire: Kent
- Ambulance: South East Coast
- UK Parliament: Tonbridge

Charcott is a hamlet in the civil parish of Leigh, in the Sevenoaks district, in the county of Kent, England. It is located within the River Medway valley. It is four miles west of the town of Tonbridge, 16 miles west of the county town of Maidstone, and 25 miles south-east of London.

== History ==
Charcott's origins trace back to the 11th century, with its earliest recorded mention in the Domesday Book. The village once served as a crossroads between ancient trackways, earning it a reputation as a minor hub of local activity. By 1841, Charcott consisted of a forge and just nine houses, gradually expanding in the decades that followed.

Local historian John Stevens spent three years researching Charcott, describing it as “almost the Spaghetti Junction of its day” due to its network of paths and connections.
