= Cheswick Buildings =

Village in Northumberland, England

Coordinates: 55.703°N 1.962°W

- Location within Northumberland
- OS grid reference: NU025455
- Unitary authority: Northumberland
- Ceremonial county: Northumberland
- Region: North East
- Country: England
- Sovereign state: United Kingdom
- Post town: BERWICK UPON TWEED
- Postcode district: TD15
- Police: Northumbria
- Fire: Northumberland
- Ambulance: North East
- UK Parliament: Berwick-upon-Tweed

Cheswick Buildings is a small village in Northumberland, in England. It is situated on the A1, approximately 10 km (6.2 mi) to the south-east of Berwick-upon-Tweed, a short distance inland from the North Sea coast, and close to Cheswick, Northumberland.

== Governance ==
Cheswick Buildings is in the parliamentary constituency of Berwick-upon-Tweed.
