= Chickerell =

Town in Dorset, England

Coordinates: 50.624°N 2.5047°W

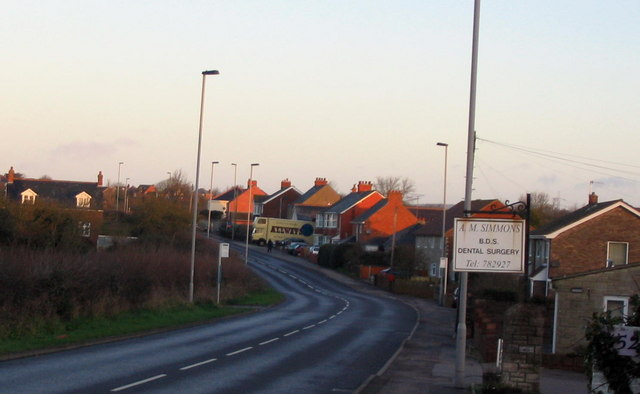
- B3157 road at Chickerell

- Location within Dorset
- Population: 6,283 (2021 census)
- OS grid reference: SY643804
- Unitary authority: Dorset
- Ceremonial county: Dorset
- Region: South West
- Country: England
- Sovereign state: United Kingdom
- Post town: Weymouth
- Postcode district: DT3
- Dialling code: 01305
- Police: Dorset
- Fire: Dorset and Wiltshire
- Ambulance: South Western
- UK Parliament: West Dorset

Chickerell is a town and parish in south Dorset, England, situated 2 miles (3 km) north-west of Weymouth. In the 2021 census the parish had a population of 6,283. The parish includes the Charlestown neighbourhood and Buckland Ripers hamlet.

== History ==
Although Roman remains have been found, indicating that there has been settlement in the area for many years, as a modern town, Chickerell is recent and one of Dorset's newest towns. Chickerell has seen much development over the last twenty years.

== Geography ==
The parish of Chickerell has to the west the Fleet Lagoon, East Fleet and Langton Herring. To the north-west is Portesham, to the east Weymouth, and to the south the Isle of Portland. Chesil Beach runs alongside to the west of the village which is part of the Jurassic Coast World Heritage Site. A major attraction in Chickerell is the Bennetts Water Gardens which is situated next to Chickerell Downs, a Woodland Trust wood. The Chickerell Rifle Range is also located close to the Fleet Lagoon, and is part of the Wyke Regis Training Area.

The Office for National Statistics define a Weymouth Built-up Area which includes Chickerell town.

== Governance ==
At the lower tier of local government, Chickerell is a civil parish. Its parish council is Chickerell Town Council, which has ten councillors elected from two wards.

At the upper tier, Chickerell is in the Dorset unitary authority. Chickerell electoral ward elects 2 members to Dorset Council.

For elections to the UK Parliament, Chickerell is in the South Dorset parliamentary constituency.

Historically, Chickerell was in Culliford Tree Hundred. It was part of Weymouth Rural District from 1894 to 1933, and Dorchester Rural District from 1933 to 1974. From 1974 to 2019, Chickerell was part of West Dorset district and returned three councillors for the district council, and one councillor for the Chickerell & Chesil Bank ward of Dorset County Council.

== Demography ==
At the 2011 census Chickerell's population was 5,515. Most of the residents (97.4%) considered themselves to be of a white, British ethnicity. Some 18% of the population were under 15, 2.8% were 16 or 17, 25.9% were between 18 and 44, 22.3% were 45 to 59, and the largest proportion (32.3%) were over 60 years of age. The birth rate in Chickerell exceeds the death rate and there is a net inward migration resulting in a steady increase of the population. Chickerell's population has grown considerably since 1960. Between 1961 and 1971 it increased by 43% from 2,300 to 3,300 and has continued to grow ever since, although at a slower rate.

Census population of Chickerell parish
Census	Population	Female	Male	Households	Source
1921	1,125				
1931	1,323				
1951	2,454				
1961	2,299				
1971	3,300				
1981	3,680				
1991	4,160				
2001	5,282	2,675	2,607	2,262	
2011	5,515	2,816	2,699	2,386	
2021	6,283	3,219	3,064	2,768	

== Economy ==
There are two industrial estates: Granby Industrial Estate and the Lynch Lane Industrial Estate. Blundell Harling Ltd, KEMET Electronics Corp., ASM Assembly Systems Ltd (formerly DEK Printing Machines Ltd), Tecan Components Ltd, Ultra Electronics, Weymouth Land Registry are some of the area's major employers.

Several sites for camping and motorhomes are located along the coast and inland.

A 45 MW gas power station and a small solar farm is located at the Chickerell Substation, where a 2.4 GWh grid battery is approved for 2028.

== Transport ==
The nearest railway station to Chickerell is Weymouth, 2.0 miles (3.2 km) away from the town. The nearest coach station is at Weymouth, the nearest airport is Bournemouth Airport.

The B3157 Chickerell Road connects Chickerell to Weymouth east bound, and Bridport along the coast to the west. This is the only major road in or near the town.
