= Charlestown, Dorset =

Suburb of Weymouth, Dorset, England

Coordinates: 50°36′43.2″N 2°29′38.4″W

Charlestown
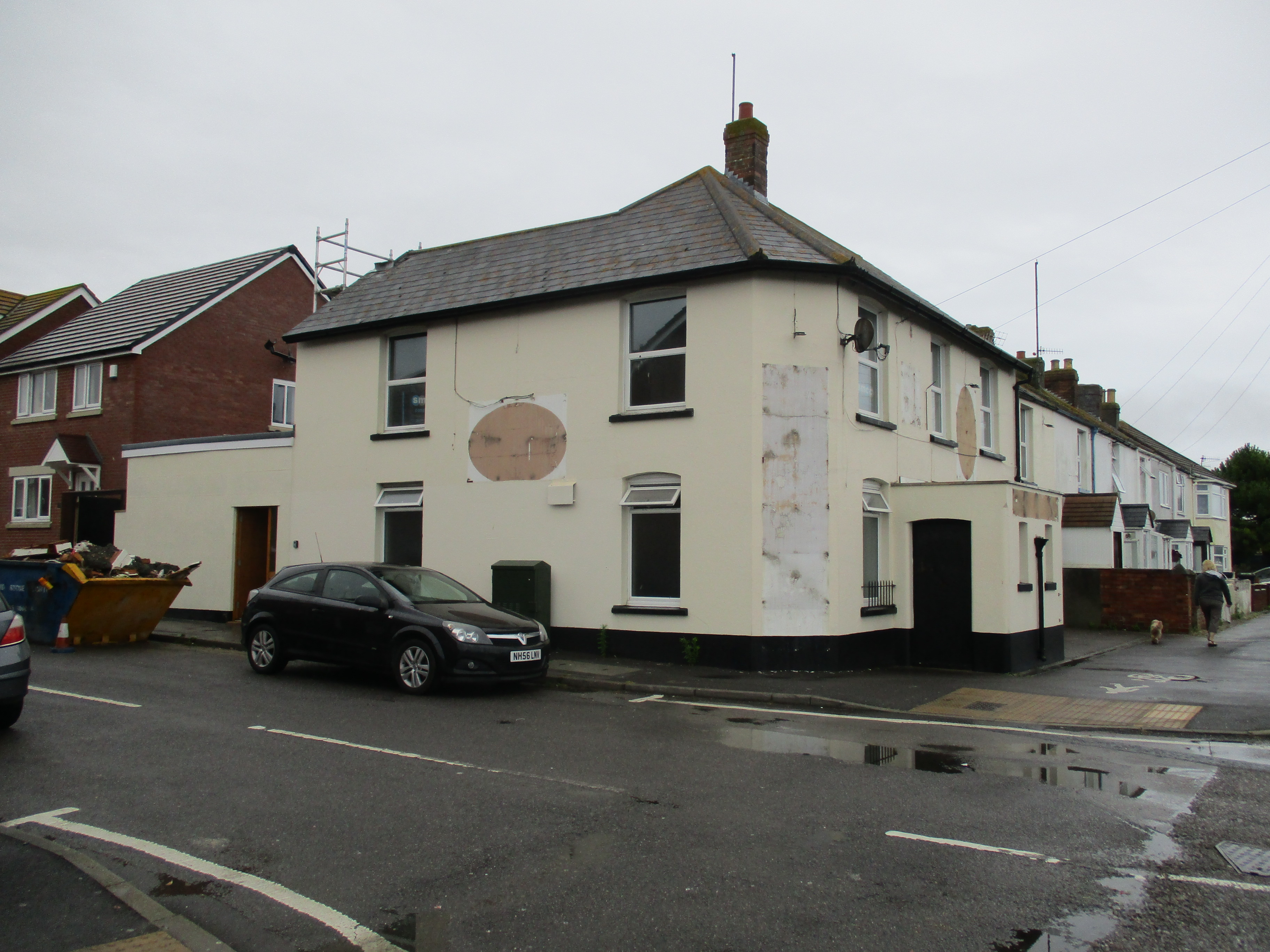
- The Alex, Charlestown

- Location within Dorset
- Civil parish: Chickerell
- Unitary authority: Dorset
- Ceremonial county: Dorset
- Region: South West
- Country: England
- Sovereign state: United Kingdom
- Post town: Weymouth
- Postcode district: DT4
- Police: Dorset
- Fire: Dorset and Wiltshire
- Ambulance: South Western
- UK Parliament: South Dorset

Charlestown is a suburb of Weymouth in Dorset, England, situated in the west of the town beside The Fleet, although it is in Chickerell parish.
