= Little Venice =

District in London, England

Coordinates: 51.52°N 0.18°W

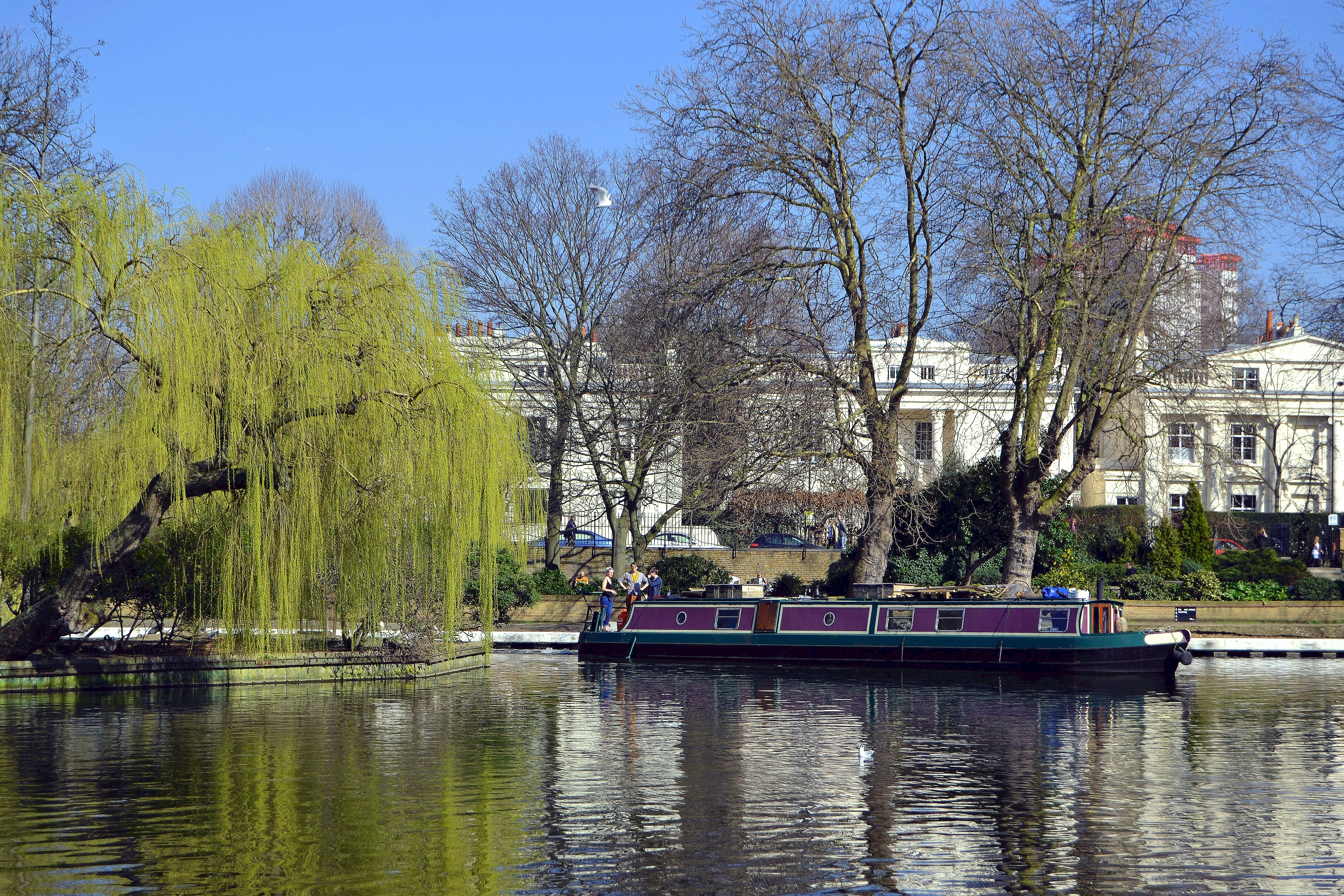
The east side of Little Venice basin (the willow tree is on the island), overlooked by white painted Regency houses

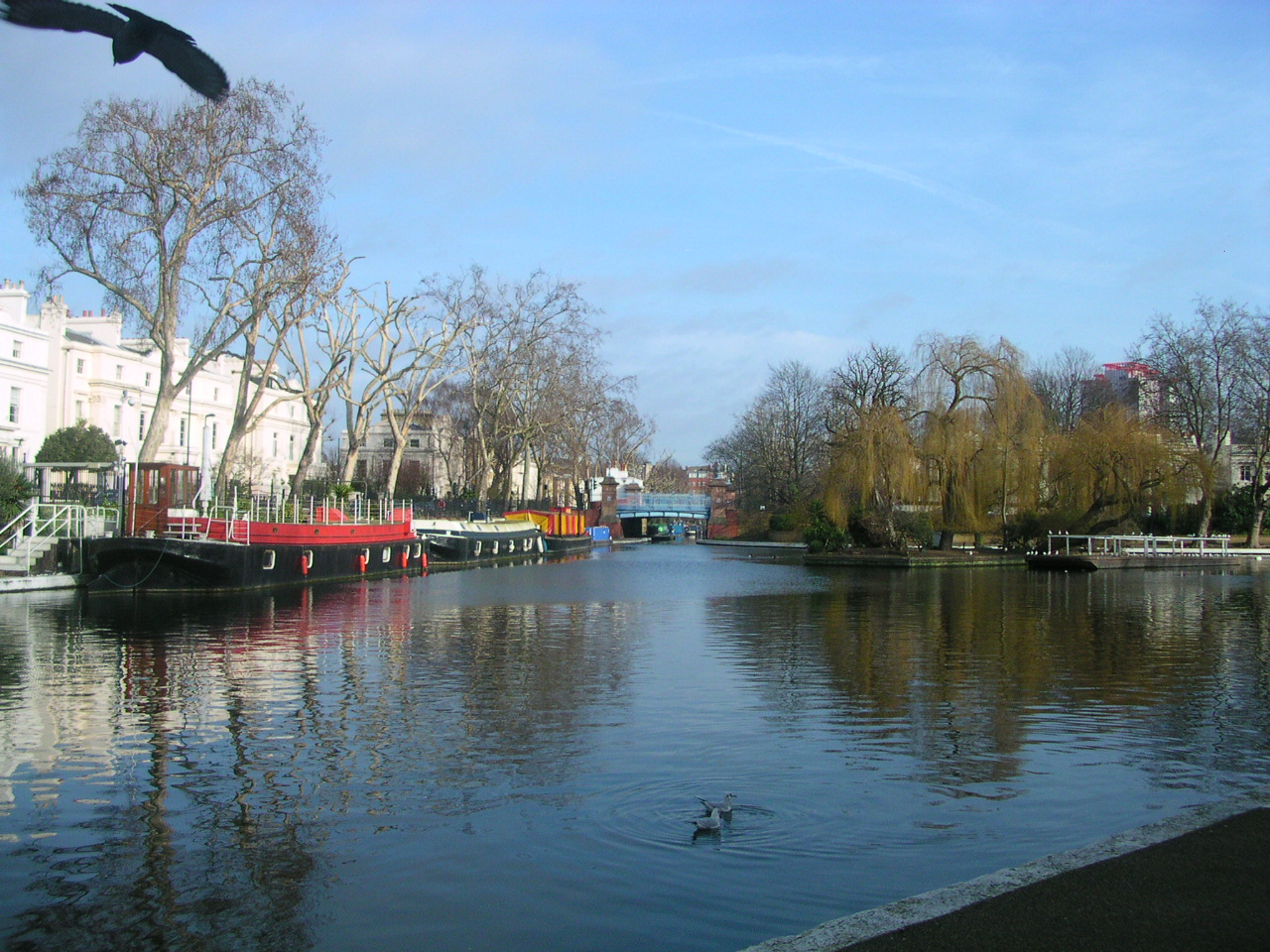
Little Venice basin viewed from the western end looking north-east towards the Regents Canal corner, with the island on the right and white Regency style terraces overlooking the basin

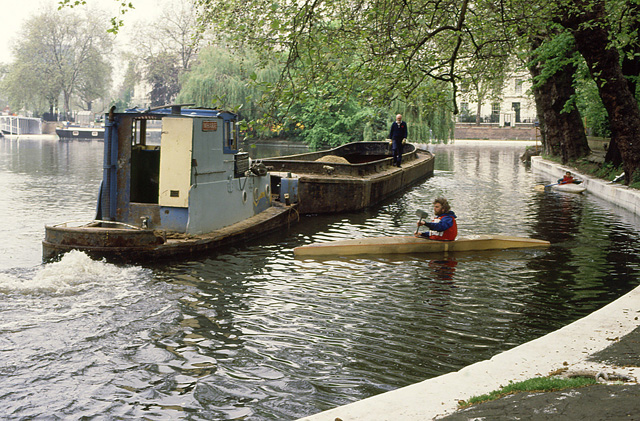
Viewed from the Paddington Basin corner of the Little Venice basin: A British Waterways tug pushes a barge towards the Regent's Canal corner (The island is behind the barge).

Little Venice is an affluent residential district in North West London, England, around the junction of the Paddington Arm of the Grand Union Canal, the Regent's Canal, and the entrance to Paddington Basin. The junction, also known as Little Venice and Browning's Pool, forms a triangular shape basin designed to allow long canal boats to turn around. Many of the buildings in the vicinity are Regency white painted stucco terraced town houses and taller blocks (mansions) in the same style. The area is 2.5 miles (4.0 km) west-north-west of Charing Cross and immediately north-west of Paddington.

The Little Venice ward of the City of Westminster had 11,040 residents in 2015. Warwick Avenue runs through the area, which is also served by a tube station of the same name.

== Name ==
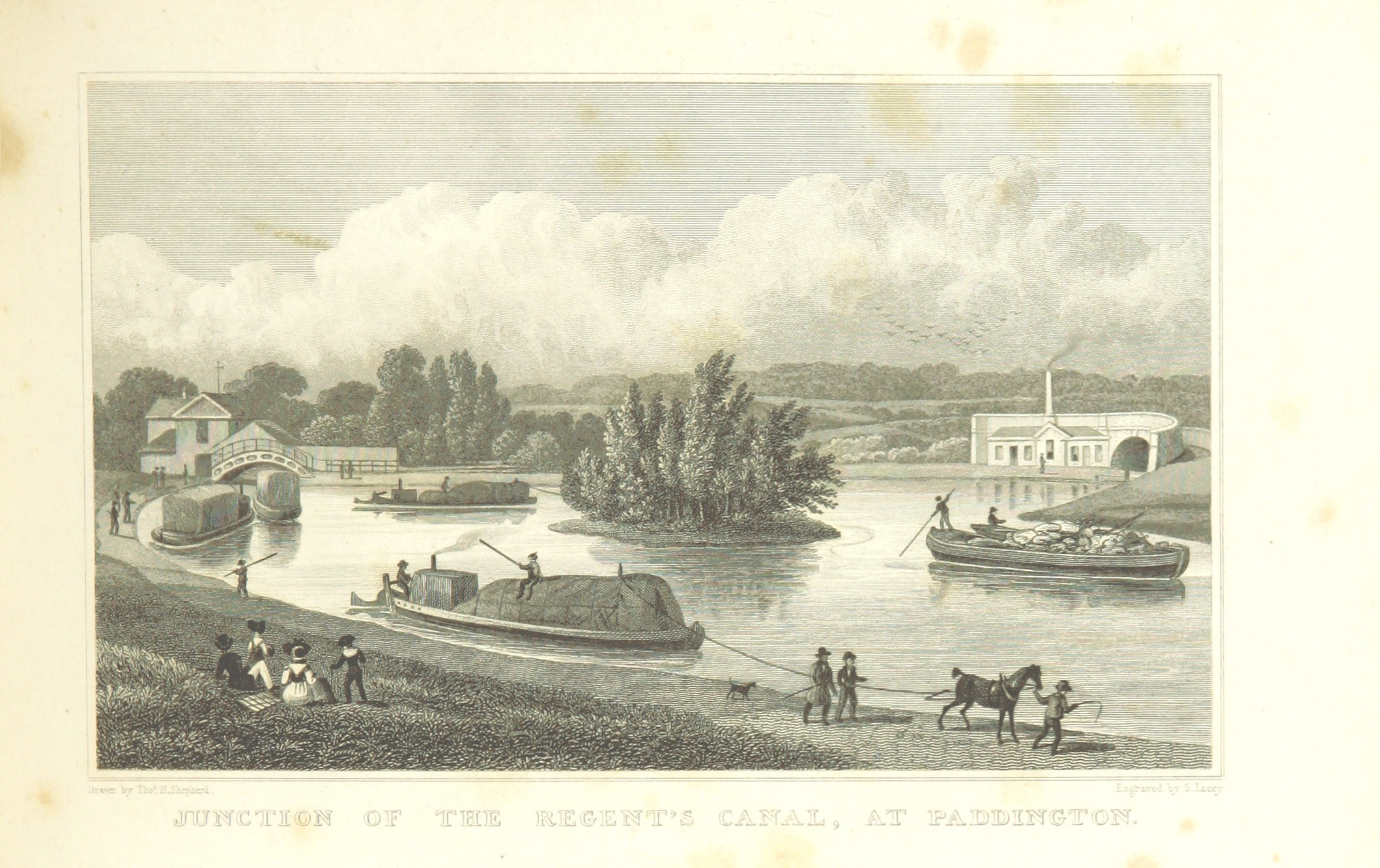
Junction of the Regent's Canal, at Paddington. Engraved by S. Lacey from a drawing by Thomas Hosmer Shepherd. Metropolitan Improvements, 1828

Little Venice is a comparatively recent name for parts of Paddington and Maida Vale in the City of Westminster, which had been referred to as London's "Venice" for a century before "Little" was added. The name was in frequent use by the latter half of the 20th century.

The origin of the name is sometimes attributed to the poet Robert Browning who lived at Beauchamp Lodge, 19 Warwick Crescent, between 1862 and 1887. This was disputed by Lord Kinross in 1966 who asserted that Lord Byron (1788–1824) first humorously compared the locale to Venice. The name "little Venice" was later formally applied to an electoral ward of the City of Westminster.

== Junction of the canals ==
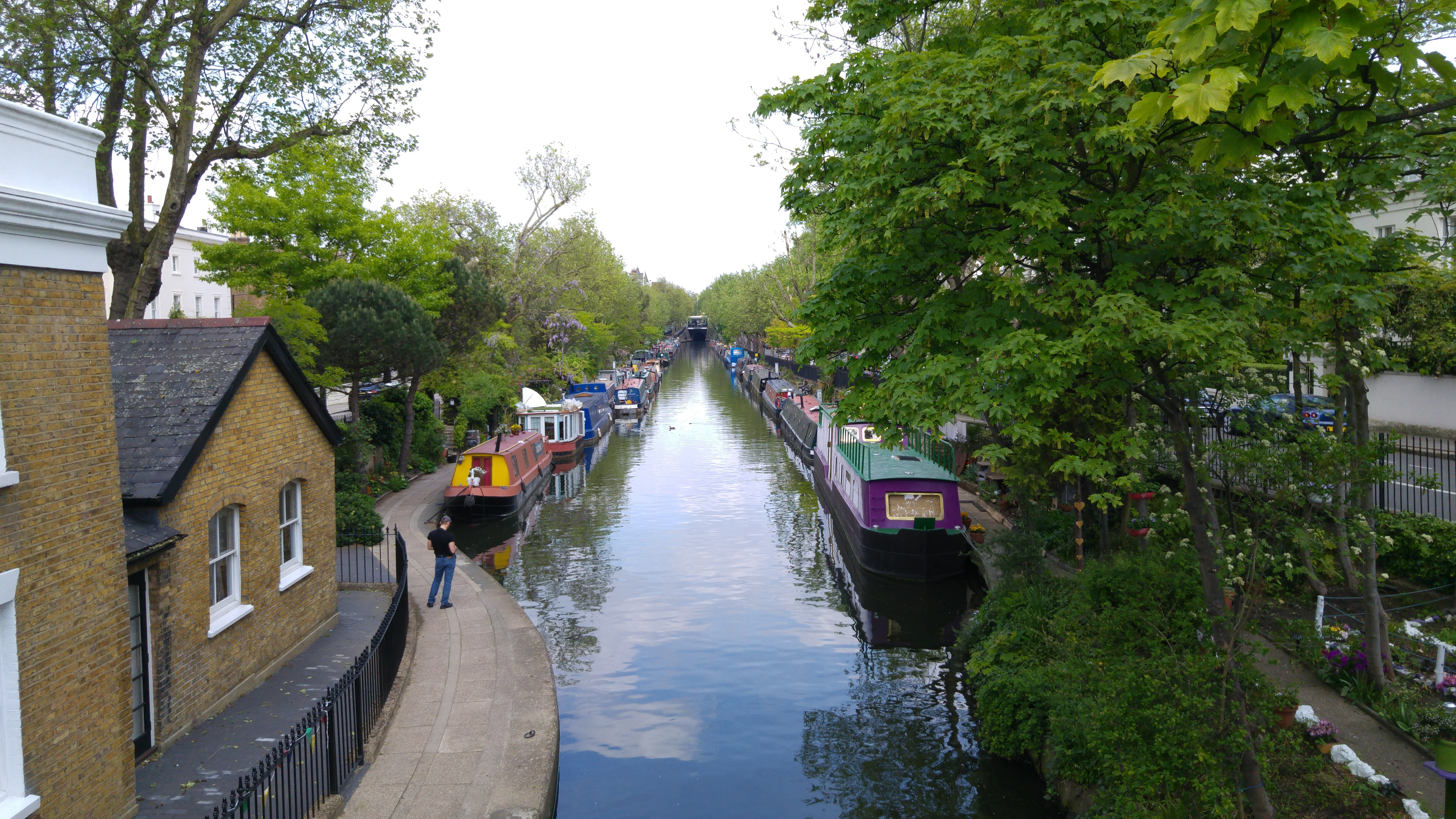
Narrowboats in Little Venice on the Regents Canal looking from the western end of the canal (which starts at the Little Venice basin) towards Maida Hill Tunnel

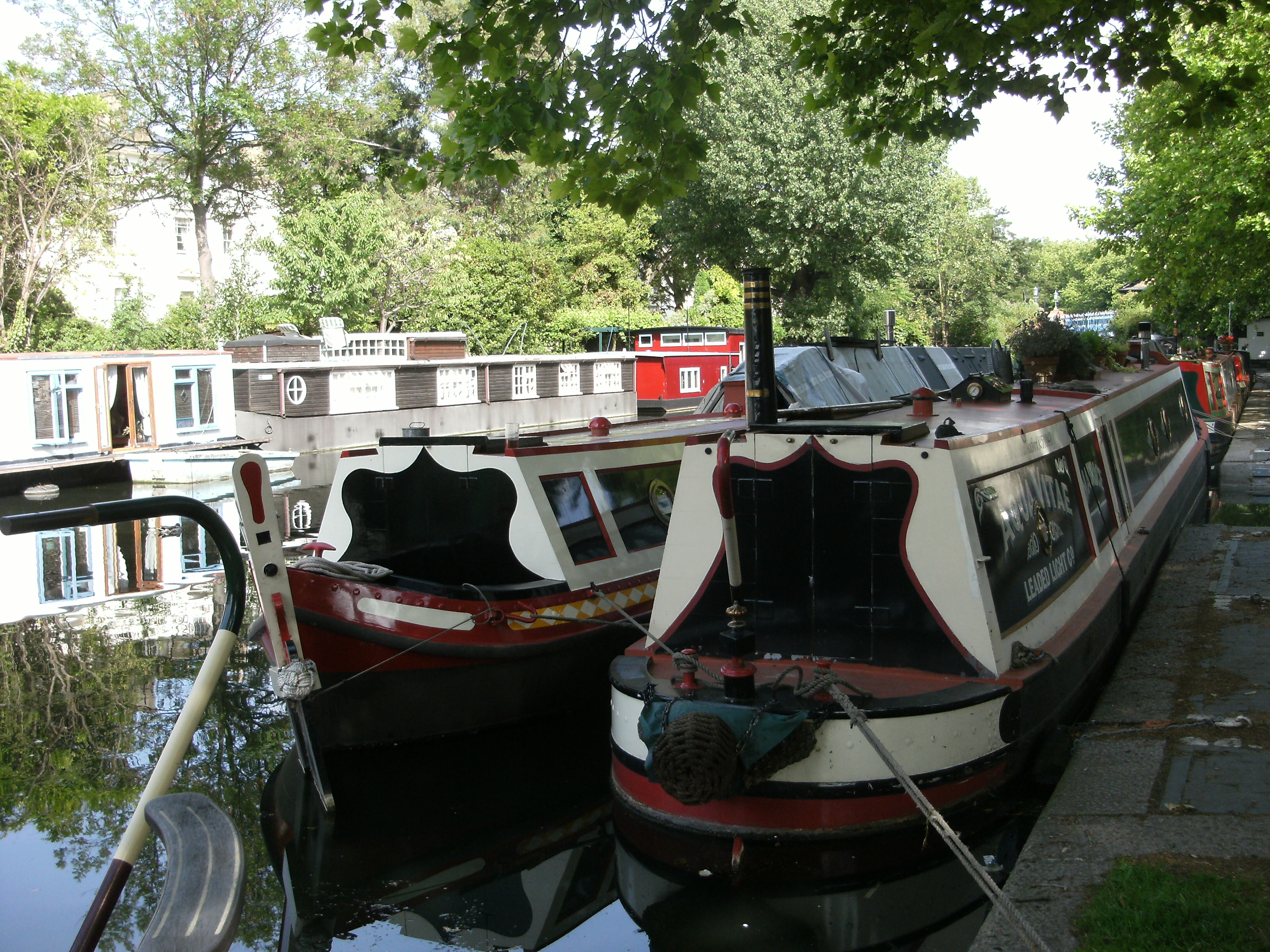
Temporarily moored narrowboats (near bank) and permanently moored houseboats (far bank) on the Grand Union Canal in Little Venice

The junction of the three canals forms a triangular basin within which is a small island. The three canals enter the basin at the corners: the Paddington Arm of the Grand Union Canal is to the west, the Regent's Canal is in the north-east corner and the short connecting canal of the Paddington Basin to the south east. The length of the sides of the basin are about 120 yards (110 m) from the Regents Canal to the other two corners and the length from the Paddington arm to the paddington basin canal is slightly longer at about 170 yards (160 m).

The basin and the Grand Union Canal form the southern boundary of the electoral ward. This means that boats moored along eastern end of the Grand Union Canal from Ha' Penny Bridge to the junction (a distance of 520 yards (480 m)) are moored within Little Venice electoral ward as are the boats moored on the Regents Canal up to the western portal of the Maida Hill Tunnel (a distance of 350 yards (320 m)).

== Extent ==

The boundaries of the neighbourhood of Little Venice are unclear; however, the majority of its buildings have white stucco facades characteristic of Regency architecture. This architectural style and the proximity to the canals defines the area. The name Little Venice is now being used for a wider area than previously to include new developments surrounding Paddington Basin (Merchant Square/Paddington Central). Although the Paddington Basin development is sometimes included as a part of Little Venice, the modern architectural style of Paddington Basin sets it apart from the rest of the area. The name Maida Vale is likewise fairly recent in origin. Most of the area was part of Paddington, a parish of early medieval creation. Land north of Browning's Pool was later referred to as Kilburn Fields, or as its then developed minority part of Kilburn, which by the mid-nineteenth century formed four ecclesiastical chapelries, the local two of which (one of which is relevant) had lain in Hampstead, but Kilburn had for centuries been a major hamlet.

It is generally considered the area is roughly bounded by Delamere Terrace, Warwick Crescent, Howley Place and Maida Avenue at the south, Maida Vale Road at the east, the Lord Hill Road / Formosa Street footbridge at the west and Sutherland Avenue at the north. This is the area surrounding the Little Venice basin and its canals containing the Regency-style white stucco buildings.

== Facilities ==
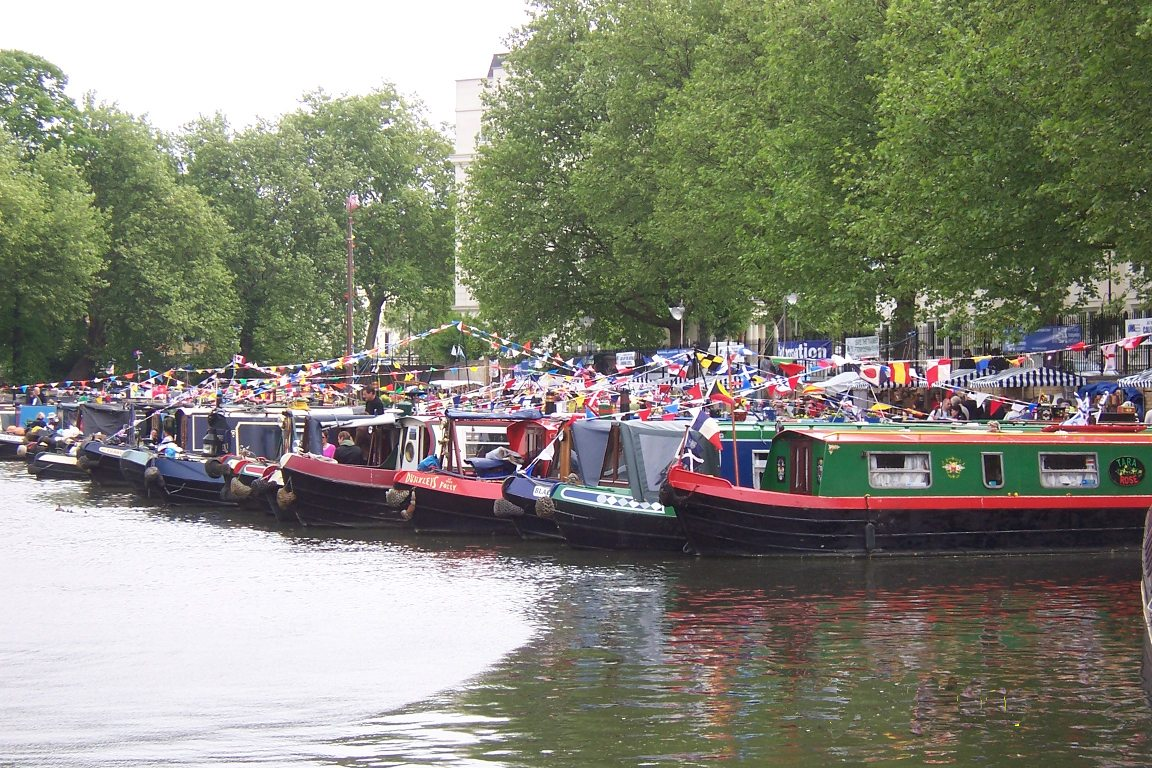
IWA Canalway Calvalcade at Little Venice in 2005

Little Venice is one of London's prime residential areas and contains restaurants, shops, theatres and pubs. Canalside venues include the Canal Cafe Theatre, the Puppet Theatre Barge, the Waterside Café, the Summerhouse Restaurant and Cafe La Ville.

In the north where the area blends into Maida Vale are three Grade II (initial category) listed pubs for their historic interiors and façades: The Warwick Castle, The Warrington, and the Prince Alfred.

Centred on the Little Venice and Paddington basins, the Inland Waterways Association has hosted a Canalway Cavalcade since 1983. It takes place over the early May Bank Holiday weekend, combining a Boat Rally with a trade show, activities and entertainments.

== Notable buildings ==
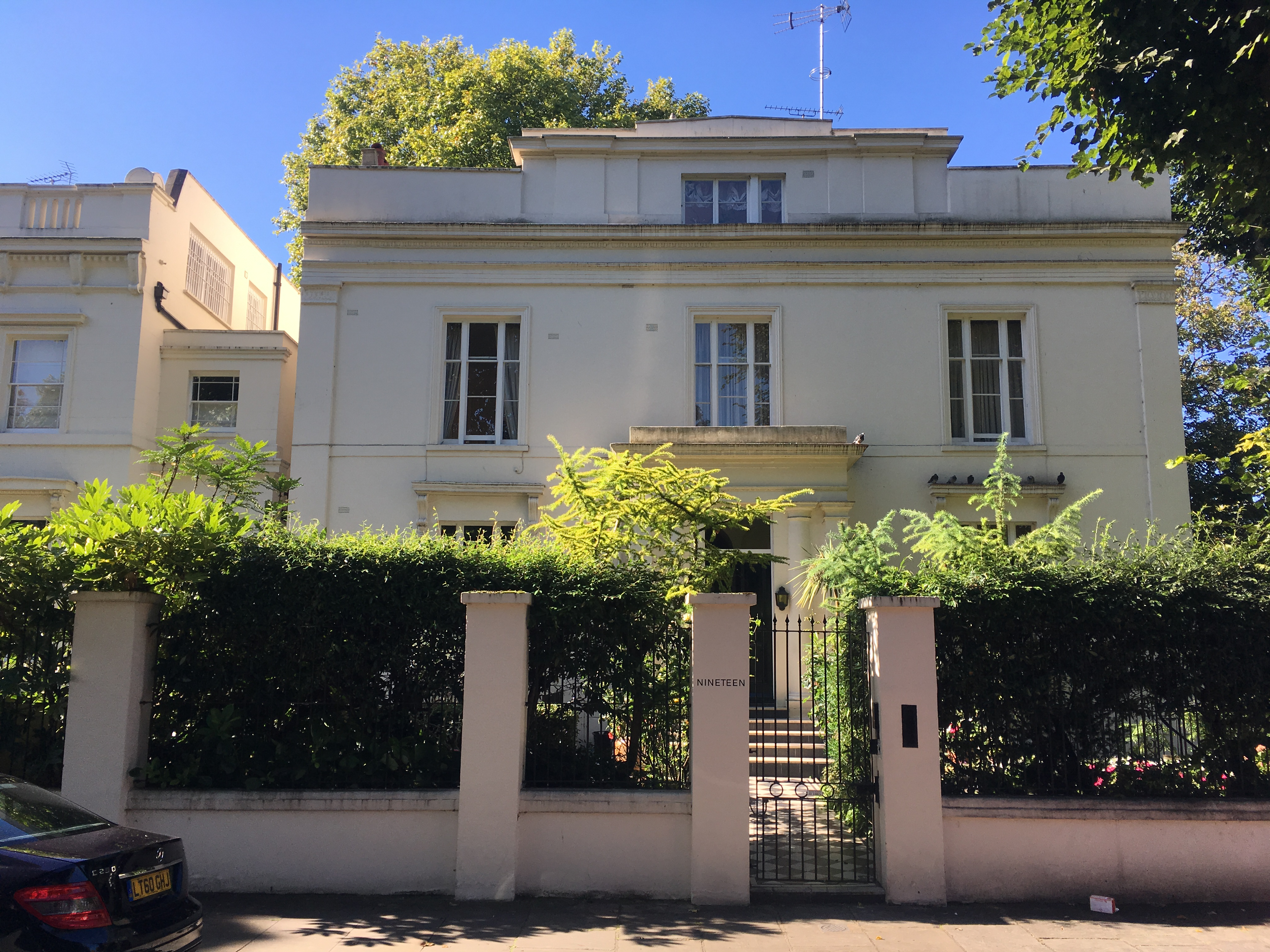
19 Park Place Villas

- The Colonnade Hotel on Warrington Crescent, originally a pair of houses dating from 1863, is particularly ornate, with mouldings and a continuous first-floor balustrade. The building has historical associations with both Alan Turing and Sigmund Freud, and there are blue plaques on the exterior attesting to this.
- Pondfield House on Clifton Gardens was formerly a Metropolitan Police section house until the 1980s.

== Notable residents ==
- The writer Katherine Mansfield stayed as a music student at Beauchamp Lodge (No. 2 Warwick Crescent) in 1908–9.
- Lennox Berkeley (1900–1989), composer, lived at 8 Warwick Avenue.
- The actor John Inman lived in a mews house in the area for 30 years.
- The psychoanalyst Sigmund Freud lived briefly in what is now the Colonnade Hotel, situated where Warrington Crescent meets Clifton Road and Warwick Avenue.
- The code-breaker and mathematician Alan Turing was born in 1912 in a maternity home in Warrington Crescent; the building later became what is now called the Colonnade Hotel (see above).
- Australian former international cricketer Shane Warne
- John Julius Norwich, historian
- Paul Weller, musician, former frontman of The Jam and The Style Council

== Transport ==
The Regent's Canal waterbus service operates from Little Venice eastward around Regent's Park, calling at London Zoo and continuing towards Camden Town. Little Venice is served by one London Underground station, Warwick Avenue on the Bakerloo line, and by the Nos. 6, 46 and 187 bus services. Paddington Station, (a main line train and underground station) is within a short walk of the area.
