= Michael Graham Cox =

English actor

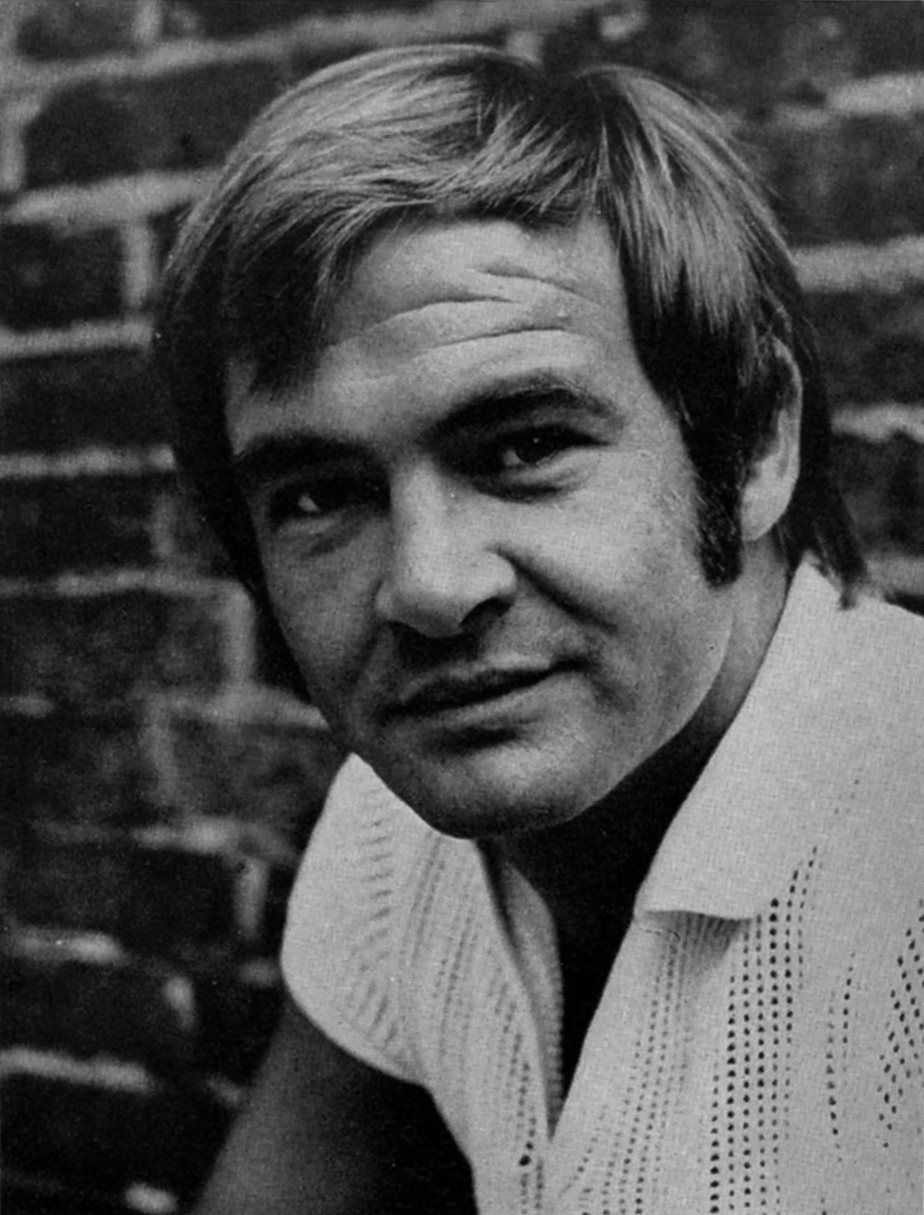
- Michael Graham Cox
- Born: 6 January 1938; Wolverhampton, England
- Died: 30 April 1995 (aged 57); London, England
- Occupation: Actor
- Years active: 1960–1995
- Height: 5ft 10in (1.78 m)

Michael Graham Cox (6 January 1938 – 30 April 1995) was an English actor.

== Career ==
Born at Wolverhampton, and educated at Wolverhampton Grammar School, Cox moved to London after graduating in music with German from Bristol University in the 1960s. First living at a flat in Oxford Street, he soon settled at Randolph Crescent W9, later being relocated by The Paddington Church Commissioners to a garden flat around the corner at 32 Clifton Gardens close to his favourite pubs The Warrington, The Prince Alfred, and The Warwick Castle, where he frequently socialised with friends including Jane Morgan, Tony Osoba, Michael Aspel and John Inman.

He is best remembered for voicing Boromir in the 1978 film The Lord of the Rings and the same character in the 1981 radio serialisation, as well as voicing Bigwig in the feature film Watership Down. But his 'Palmer' in Ken Russell's 1969 'Women in Love' is arguably his career highlight.

In 1982 he appeared as Wally Brabham in Minder episode 10 of series 3; "Broken Arrow".

Cox had a minor role in Richard Attenborough's A Bridge Too Far and Cry Freedom. He appeared many times on stage and in television dramas such as Grange Hill, as kindly teacher Mr. Butterworth. He also starred with Derek Nimmo and Rosemary Leach in the TV sitcom Life Begins at Forty. Other BBC radio dramas produced and directed by Jane Morgan (a lifelong, friend and colleague) included her Dickens series.

Stratford roles with the Old Vic on tour of the late 1950s embedded Cox as Shakespearean. West End stage roles in early 1960s included Coward's 'Hay Fever' with Prunella Scales, Roland Culver. 1970s saw him at the Roundhouse with the Prospect Theatre's Histories tour. The 1970s and 1980s saw him as Antony to Delphine Seyrig's Cleopatra, and alongside James Bolam's King Lear, together with several other productions at The Young Vic, at The Cut.

Cox died on 30 April 1995 at a hospice in Wimbledon, following several strokes, diabetic complications and finally dementia, all alcohol induced. He was buried next to his brother John at the Catholic Diocese of Beaconsfield. His wife Davina Beswick, a fellow alumnus of Bristol Old Vic died on 31 July 2018 at Sudbury, Suffolk. Their only child, Dominic, a Cambridge-educated architect, John's only child Susan (his niece), and her mother June, survive him, residing in Western Kenya, and Banbury, Oxfordshire, respectively.

== Filmography ==
Year	Title	Role	Notes
1960	An Age of Kings	Carrier / Davy / Drawer	
1965	For Whom the Bell Tolls	Andres	TV series
1969	Women in Love	Palmer	
1973	The Optimists	Park Keeper	
1975	King Arthur, the Young Warlord	Howard	
1977	A Bridge Too Far	Captain Cleminson	
1978	Watership Down	Bigwig	Voice
1978	The Lord of the Rings	Boromir	Voice
1983	Grange Hill	Mr Butterworth	TV series, 1 episode
1984	The Little Drummer Girl	Donald / Soldier	
1987	Cry Freedom	3rd Passport Control officer	
