= Blomfield Road =

Street in London, England

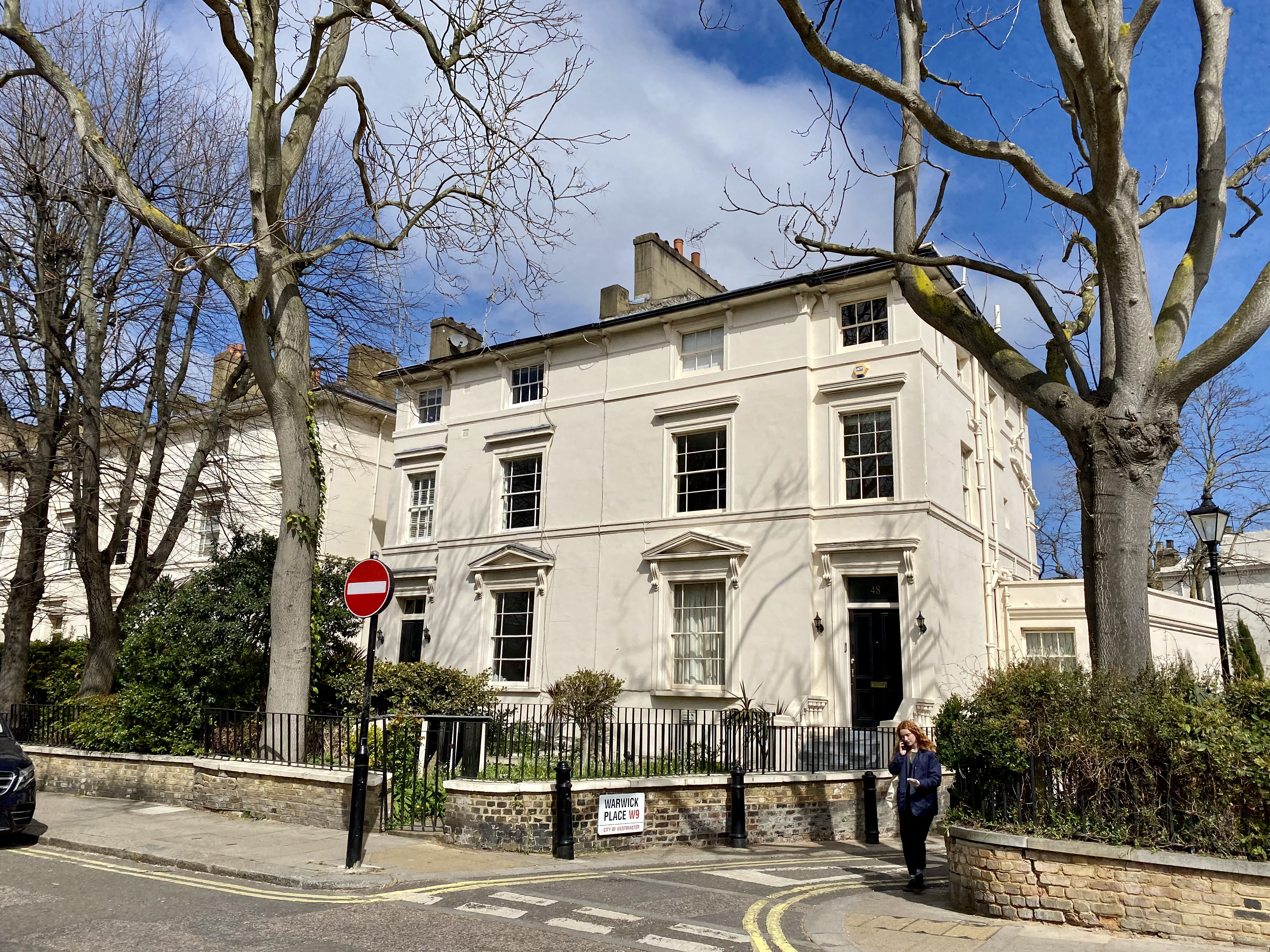
48 Blomfield Road featuring mid-nineteenth century stucco.

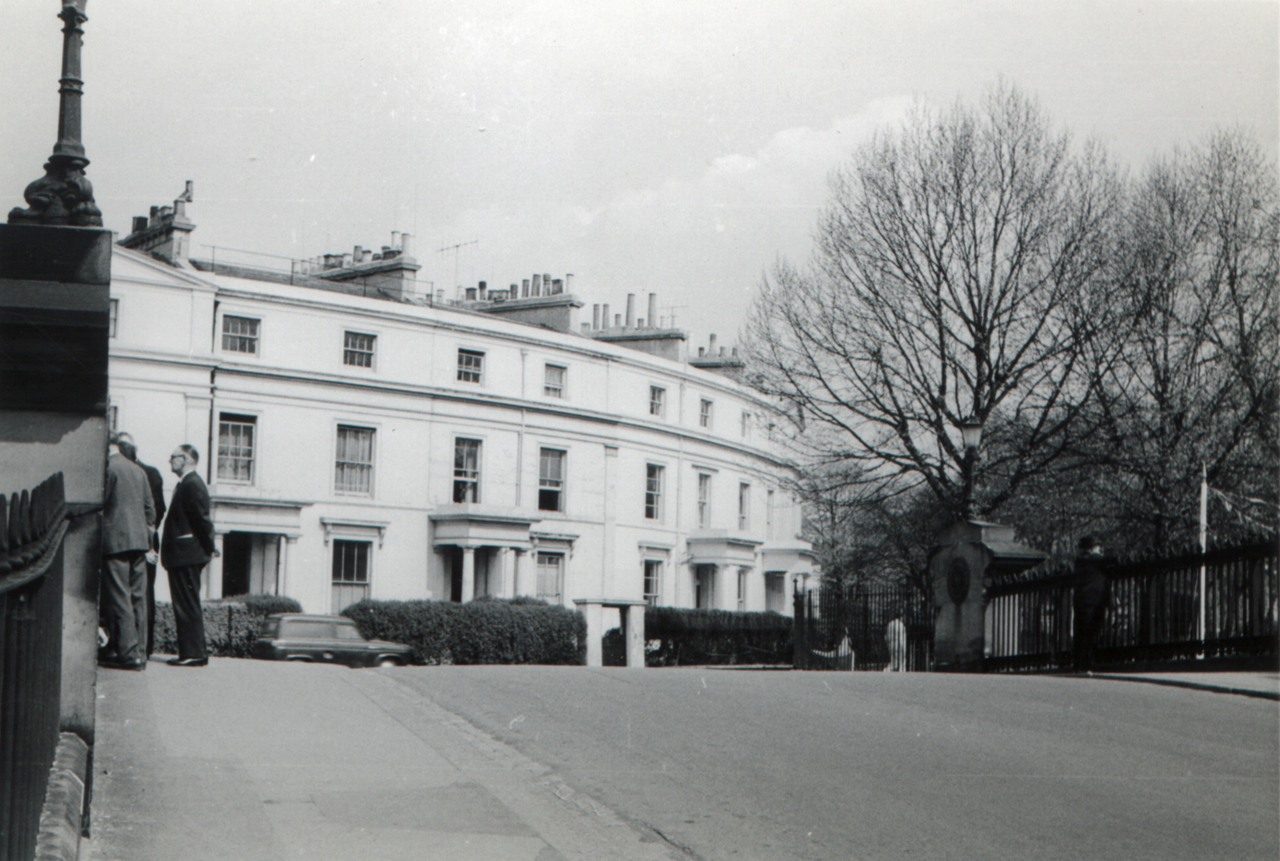
Houses on Blomfield Road, 1958

Blomfield Road is a street in the Maida Vale area of Central London. Located in the London Borough of Westminster it runs on the northern bank of the Regent's Canal in Little Venice. The road branches westwards off the A5 and runs directly along the canal with both Randolph Avenue and Warwick Avenue running north off it. It then follows the canal by turning sharply northwards until it meets with Formosa Street.

The street features the white stucco villas or terraces common for the area, dating back to the Victorian era. Numbers 1-45 were constructed from 1840 to 1847. Maida Avenue runs directly opposite it across the canal for much of its route. A bridge across the canal connects it to Westbourne Terrace Road. It takes its name from Charles James Blomfield, the Bishop of London from 1828 to 1856. Multiple buildings are now Grade II listed.

== Bibliography ==
- Bebbington, Gillian. London Street Names. Batsford, 1972.
- Bolitho, Hector and Peel, Derek. Without the City Wall: An Adventure in London Street-names, North of the River. Murray, 1952.
- Cherry, Bridget & Pevsner, Nikolaus. London 3: North West. Yale University Press, 2002.
- Cockburn, J. S., King, H. P. F. & McDonnell, K. G. T. & A History of the County of Middlesex. Institute of Historical Research, 1989.
- Girling, Brian. Bayswater to Little Venice Through Time. Amberley Publishing Limited, 2016.
