= Maida Avenue =

Street in London, England

Coordinates: 51.5231°N 0.1793°W

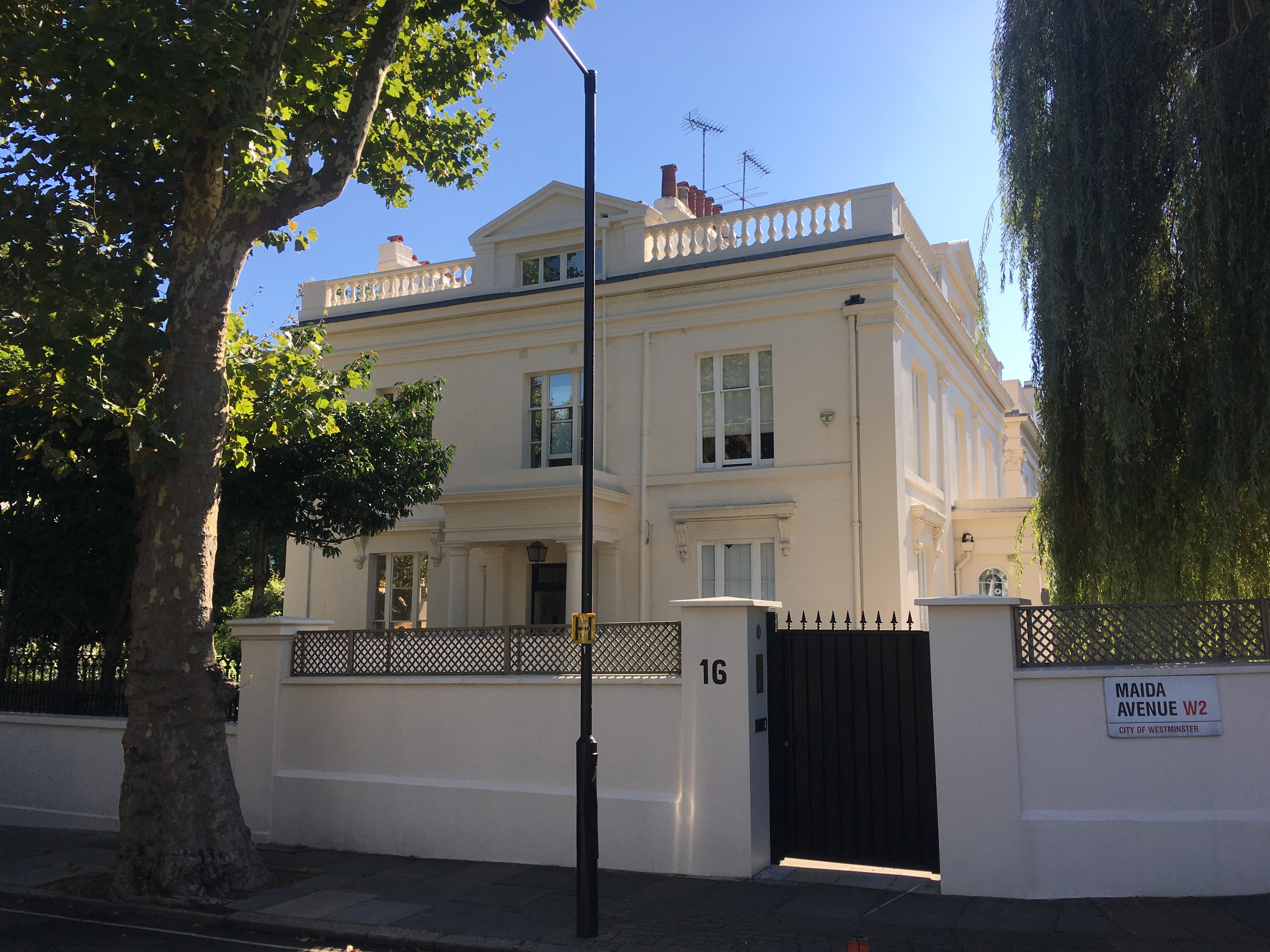
A villa typical of the Regency era residences on the street.

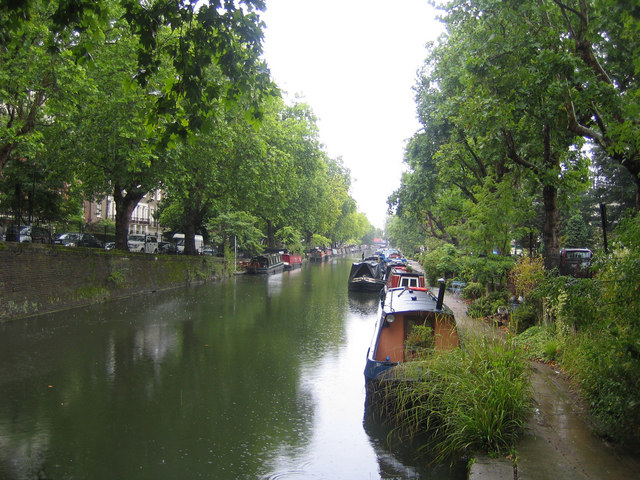
Maida Avenue (on the left) runs by the Regent's Canal.

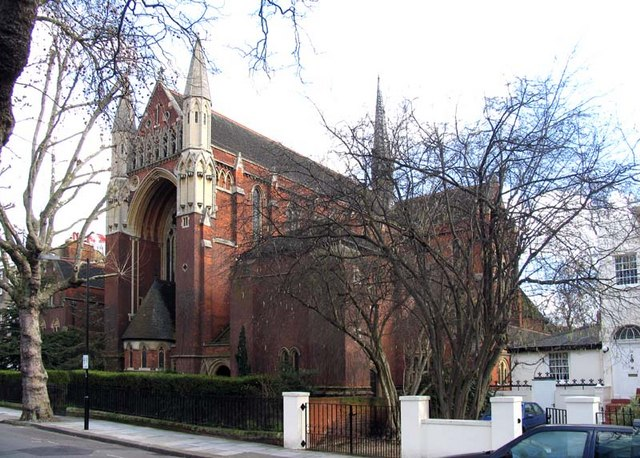
The Grade I listed Catholic Apostolic Church built in 1891.

Maida Avenue is a road in the Little Venice area of Maida Vale in London. Located in the City of Westminster, it follows the southern bank of the Regent's Canal close to its junction with the Grand Union Canal. It runs between Warwick Avenue and Edgware Road. Directly across the canal Blomfield Road runs parallel to Maida Avenue.

The area was developed in the early nineteenth century and in its early years it was known as Maida Hill West. In 1891 the architect John Loughborough Pearson designed the Catholic Apostolic Church in the street, which is now Grade I listed.

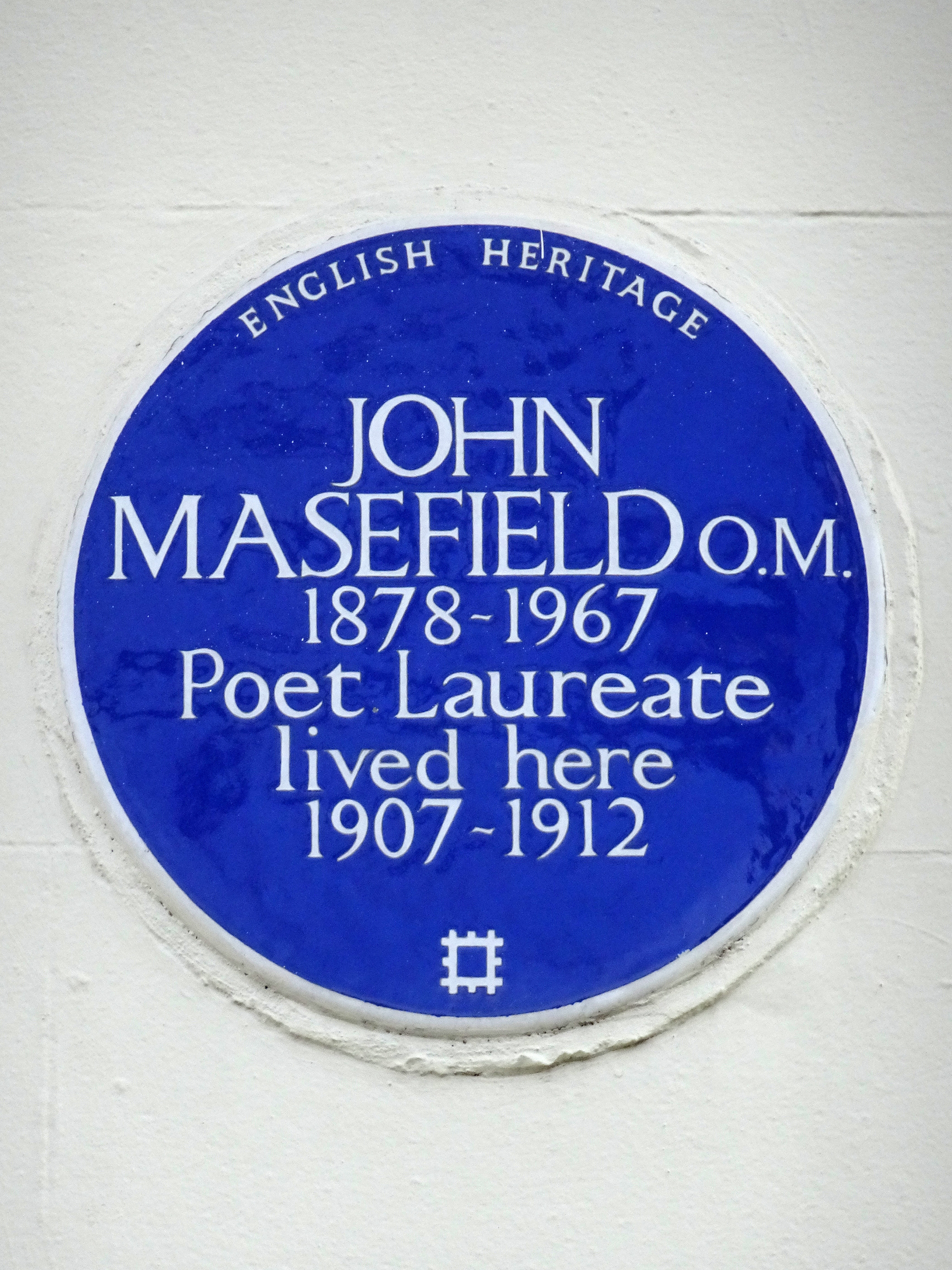
Blue plaque for the poet John Masefield.

A blue plaque in the street commemorates the former residence of the poet John Masefield. The actor Arthur Lowe, known for his role as Captain Mainwaring in the BBC television series Dad's Army, lived in Maida Avenue from 1969 to 1982.

== Bibliography ==
- Adams, Mark. Location London: London's Film Locations Uncovered. Interlink Publishing Group Incorporated, 2004.
- Bebbington, Gillian. London Street Names. Batsford, 1972.
- Cockburn, J. S., King, H. P. F. & McDonnell, K. G. T. & A History of the County of Middlesex. Institute of Historical Research, 1989.
- Cherry, Bridget & Pevsner, Nikolaus. London 3: North West. Yale University Press, 2002.

Media related to Maida Avenue, London at Wikimedia Commons
