= Warwick Avenue =

Warwick Avenue may refer to:

- Warwick Avenue, London, residential avenue in London
- Warwick Avenue tube station, a London Underground station on the Bakerloo line located on the avenue
- "Warwick Avenue" (song), a 2008 single by Duffy
