= Warwick Castle, Maida Vale =

Pub in Maida Vale, London

The Warwick Castle
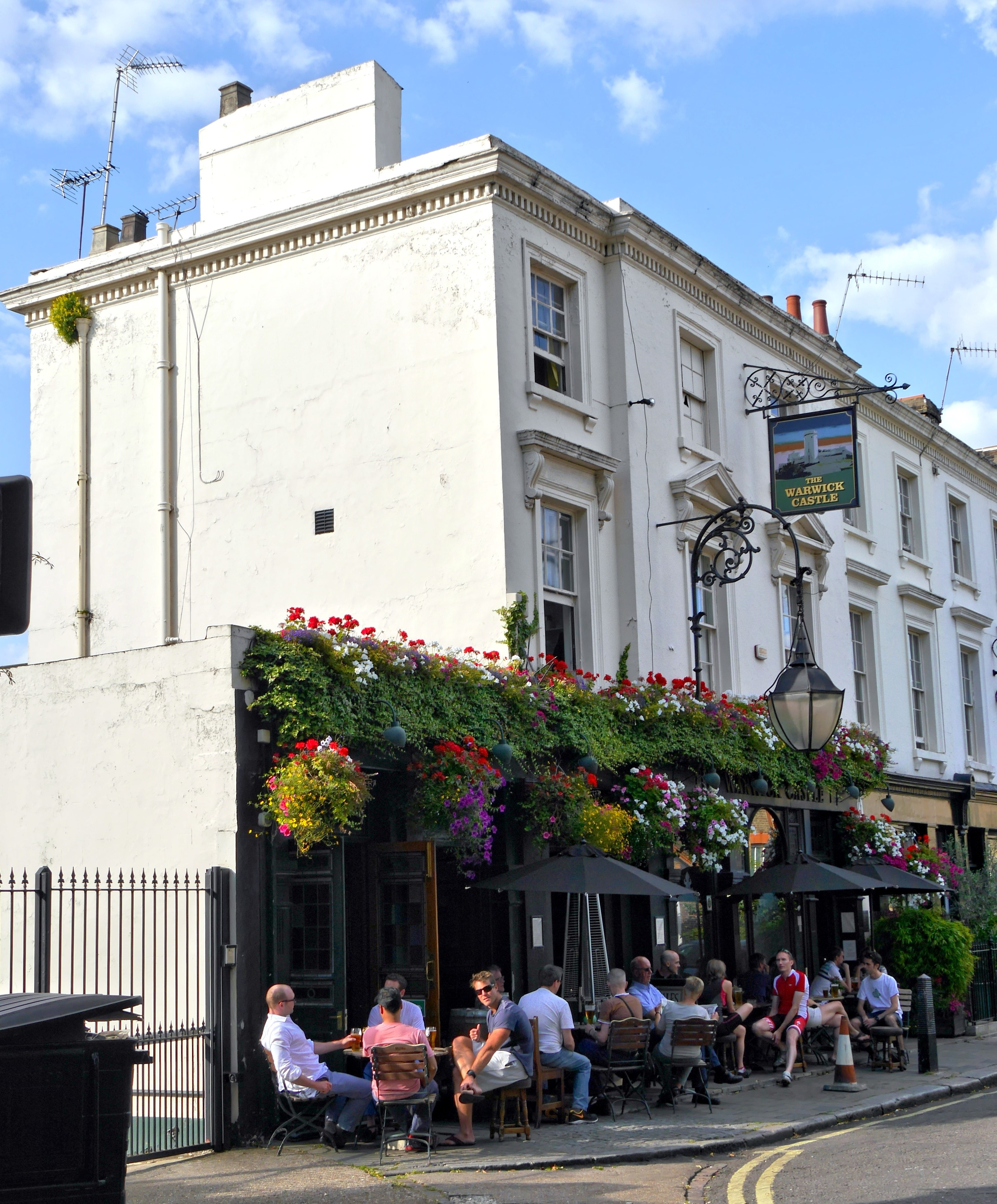
- The Warwick Castle
- Interactive map of The Warwick Castle
- Type: Public house
- Location: Warwick Place, Maida Vale, London
- Coordinates: 51°31′19.6″N 0°11′1.57″W
- Built: 1846

Listed Building – Grade II
- Official name: NUMBERS 1 TO 5 AND WARWICK CASTLE PUBLIC HOUSE
- Designated: 01-Dec-1987
- Reference no.: 1273925

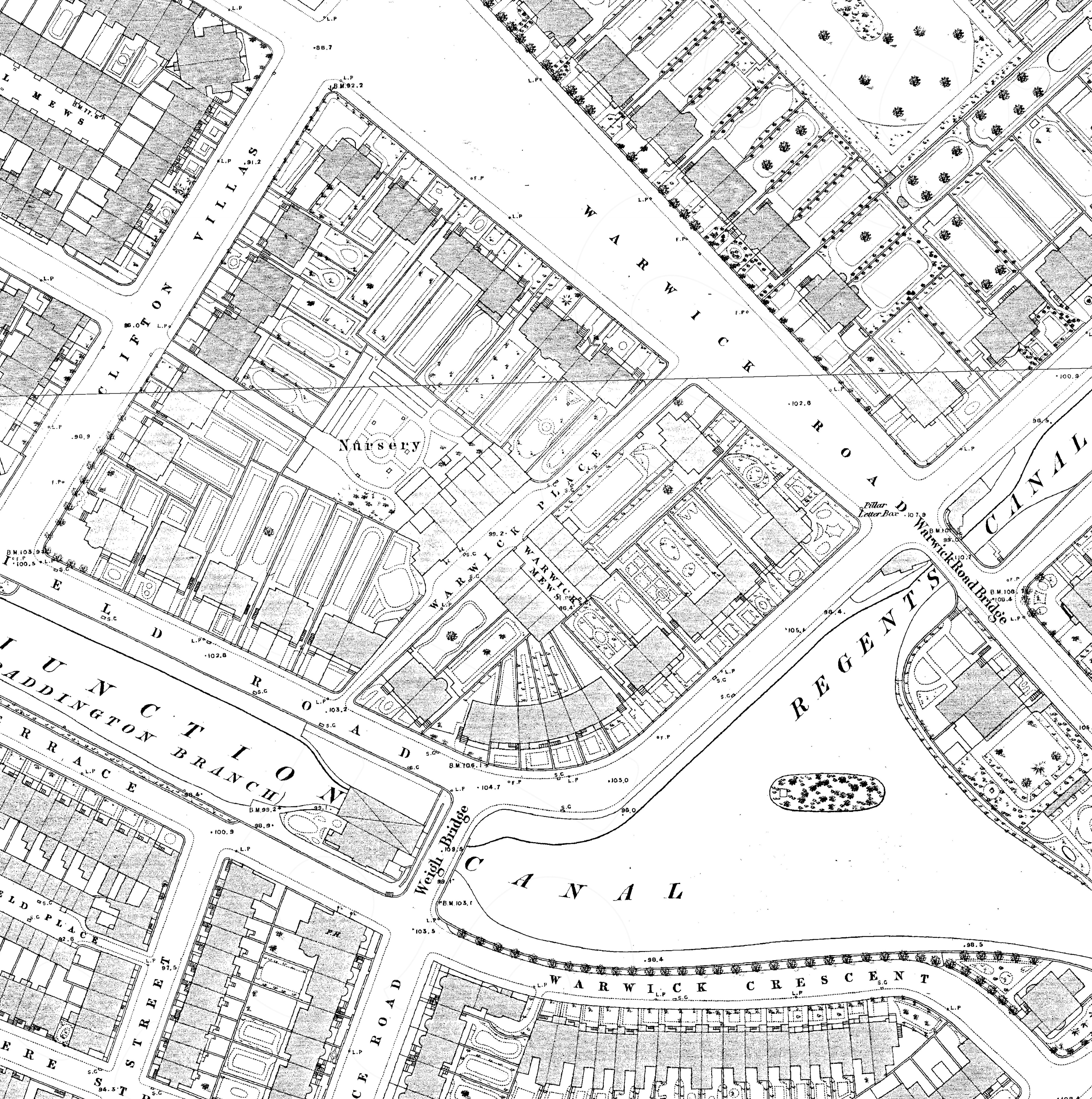
Warwick Place, on an 1860s Ordnance Survey map not long after the street was built. (centre)

The Warwick Castle is a grade II listed public house at Warwick Place, Maida Vale, London, that was built in 1846. It and Warwick Place were named after Jane Warwick, the bride of the original landowner. The pub is mentioned in the biographies of a number of music figures and London "characters".

== History ==
The pub dates from 1846 and is grade II listed with Historic England along with the whole of the terrace of numbers 1 to 5 Warwick Place on the north side of the street. Among the architectural details mentioned by Historic England in their listing are the scrolled iron lamp and sign brackets for the pub. The pub and the street took their name from the original landowner, who married Jane Warwick of Warwick Hall, near Carlisle, in 1778. Brian Spiller speculates in his book Victorian Public Houses that the pub's "discreet location in a cul-de-sac may have made it a refuge for domestic servants from the neighbouring stucco villas and terraces".

It featured in Maurice Gorham's 1939 book The Local, and his 1949 follow-up volume, Back to the Local, both with illustrations of the pub by the artist Edward Ardizzone, including the front cover of the 1949 volume. Ardizzone lived in Maida Vale for most of his life, and Gorham was his regular drinking partner.

Regular customers have included the Welsh drug smuggler and author Howard Marks, who recounts in his autobiography Mr. Nice that he concluded a drug deal there, while half of a consignment of Thai grass was hidden in a car parked outside.

Music entrepreneur Richard Branson was a regular at the pub in the 1970s, early in his career, when his office was a barge on the Grand Union Canal about 100m away. Michael Caborn-Waterfield, known for setting up the first Ann Summers sex shop in 1970, was also a customer, as was the musician Rick Wakeman in the 1980s, when he lived in nearby Elgin Mansions.

== Gallery ==
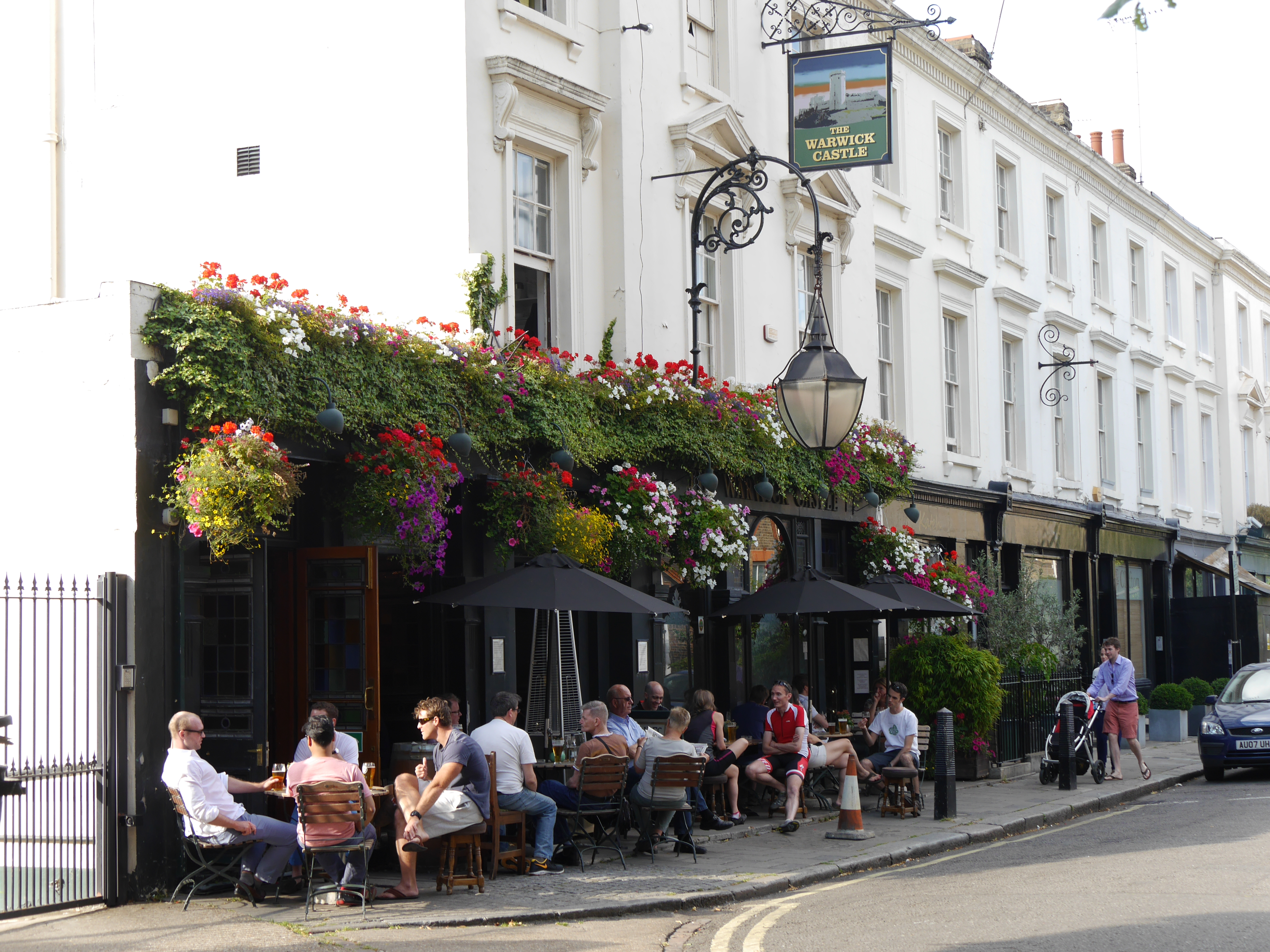
The listed terrace of 1 to 5 Warwick Place

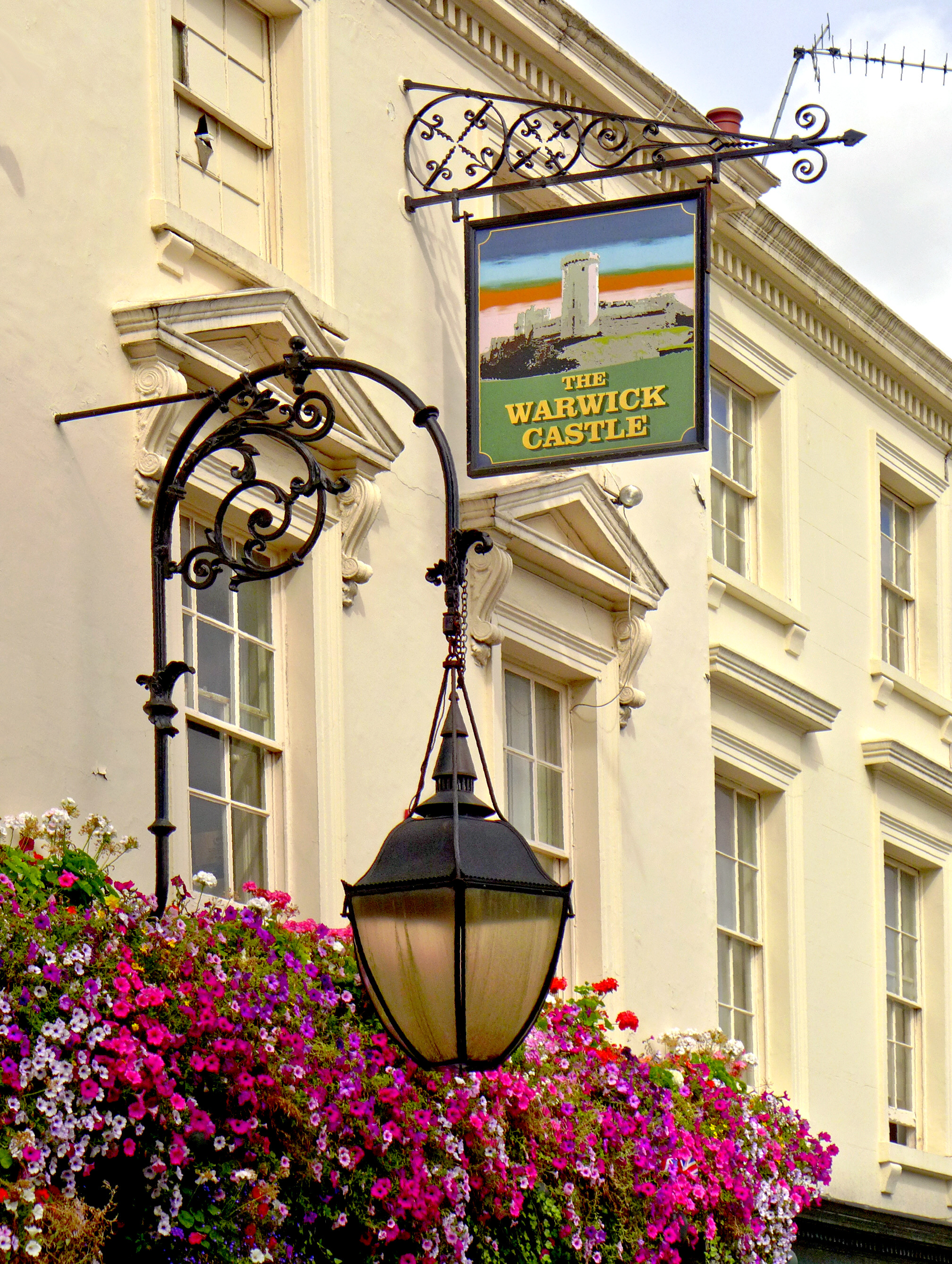
Scrolled iron lamp and sign brackets mentioned by Historic England

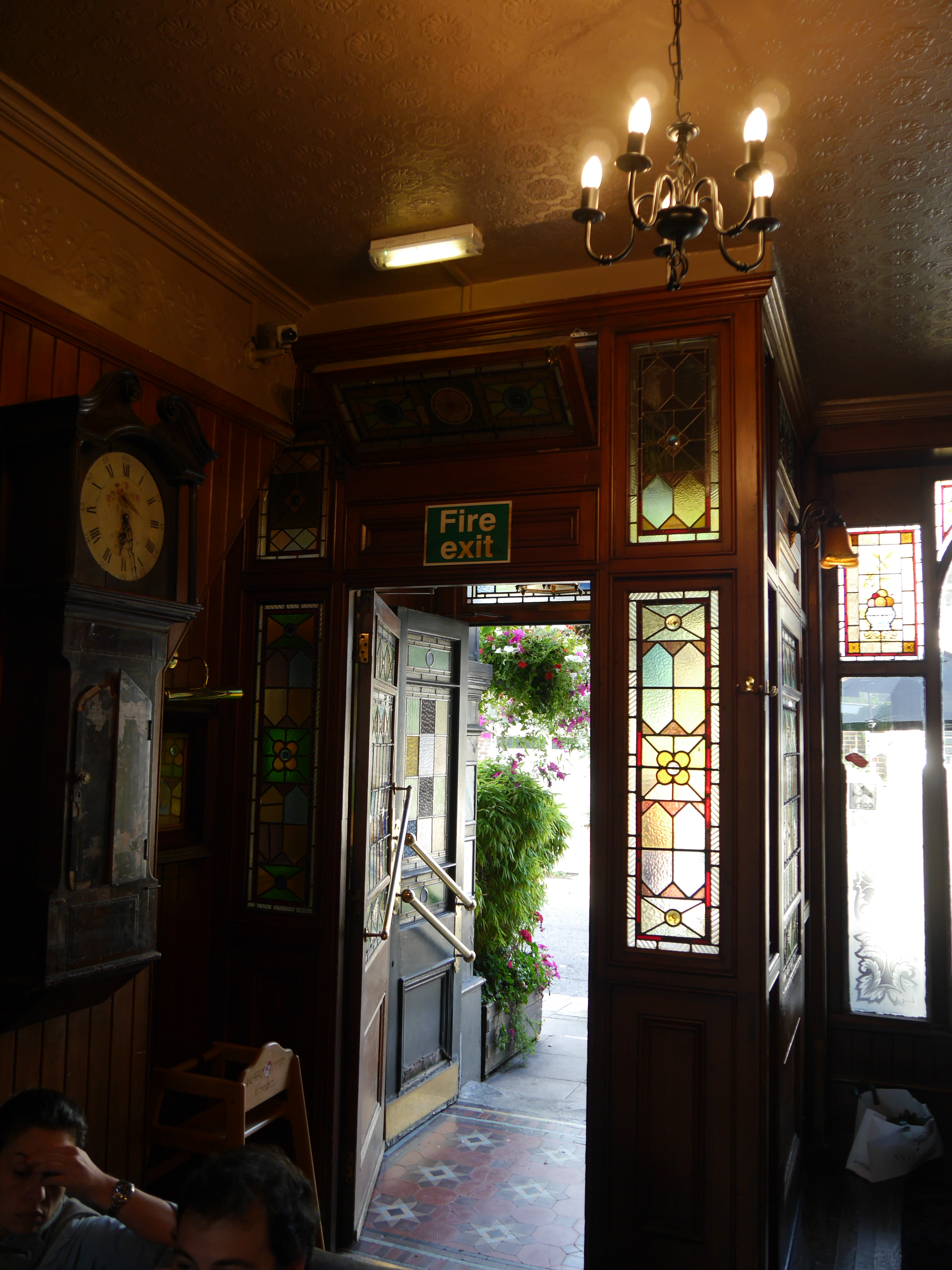
Interior showing leaded windows with coloured inserts

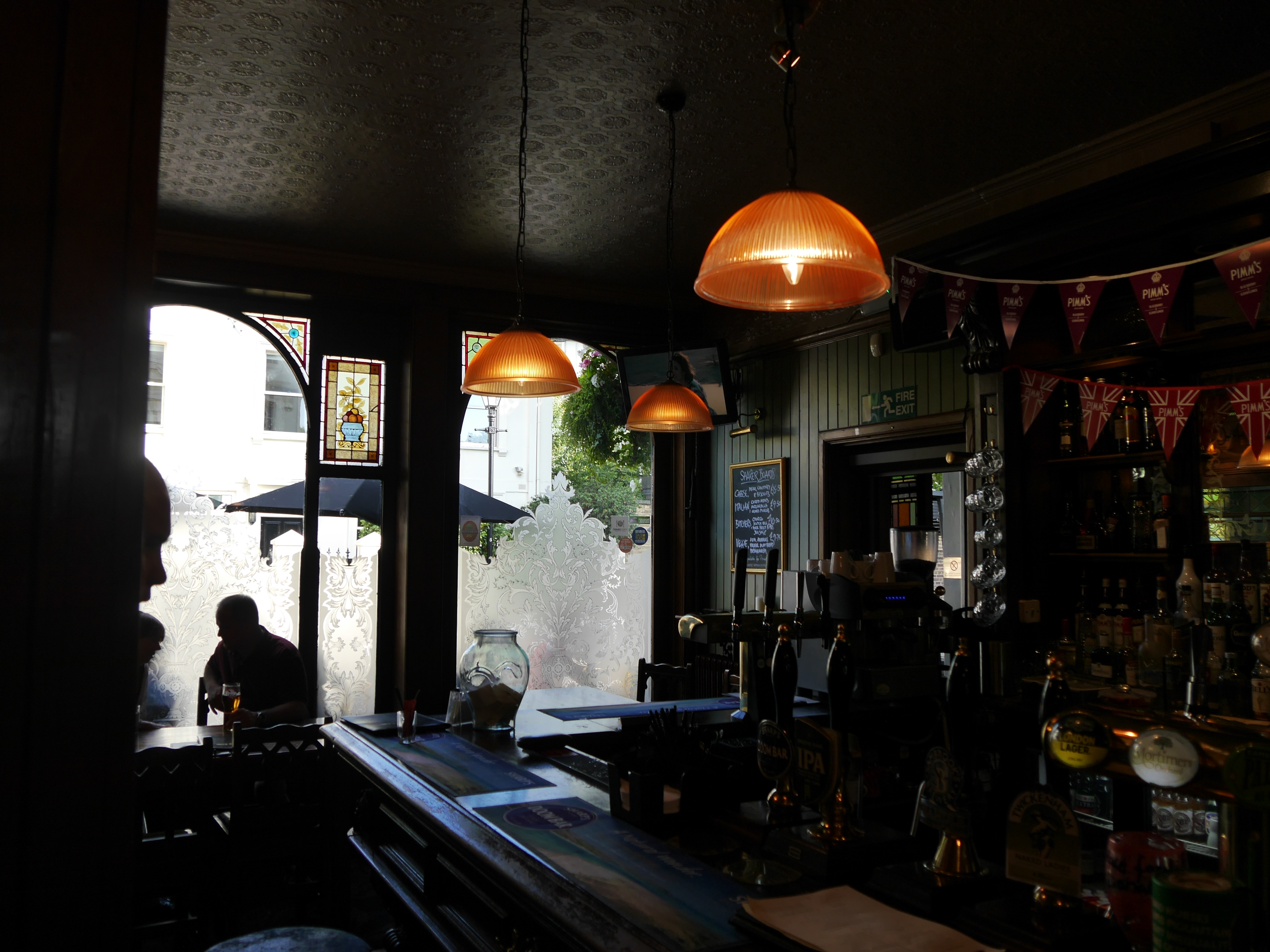
Interior showing etched windows

== See also ==
- Warwick Avenue
