= Colonnade Hotel =

Hotel in London

The Colonnade Hotel
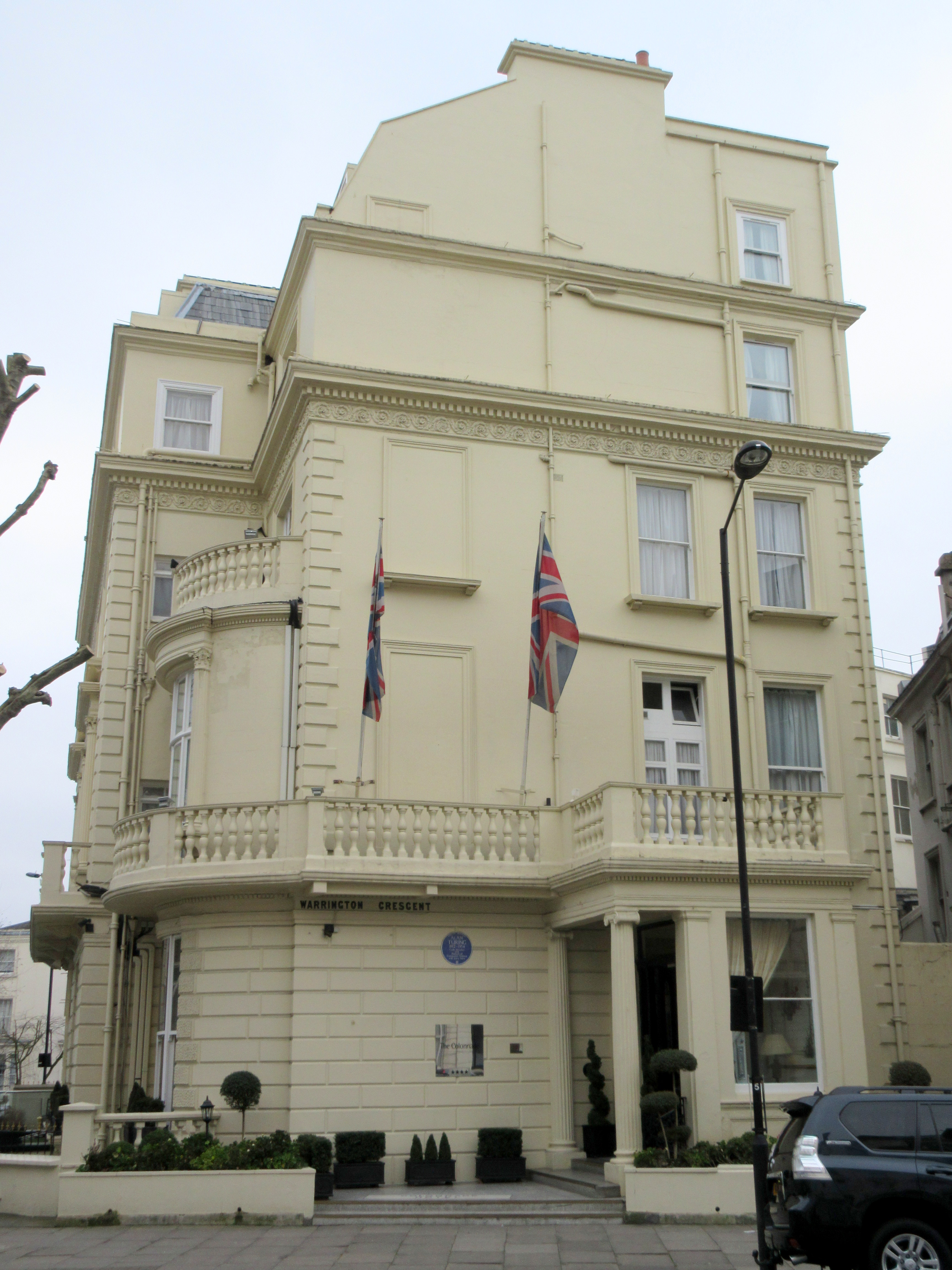
- Interactive map of the The Colonnade Hotel area

General information
- Location: 2 Warrington Crescent; Little Venice; London W9 1ER; United Kingdom
- Coordinates: 51.5243°N 0.1846°W
- Opening: 1935
- Owner: Eton Collection

Other information
- Number of rooms: 43
- Number of suites: 3

Website
- Colonnade Hotel

The Colonnade Hotel (previously known as The Esplanade hotel) is a 4-star London hotel with 43 rooms, of which three are suites. The hotel is located north of Warwick Avenue Underground station and Little Venice.

== History ==
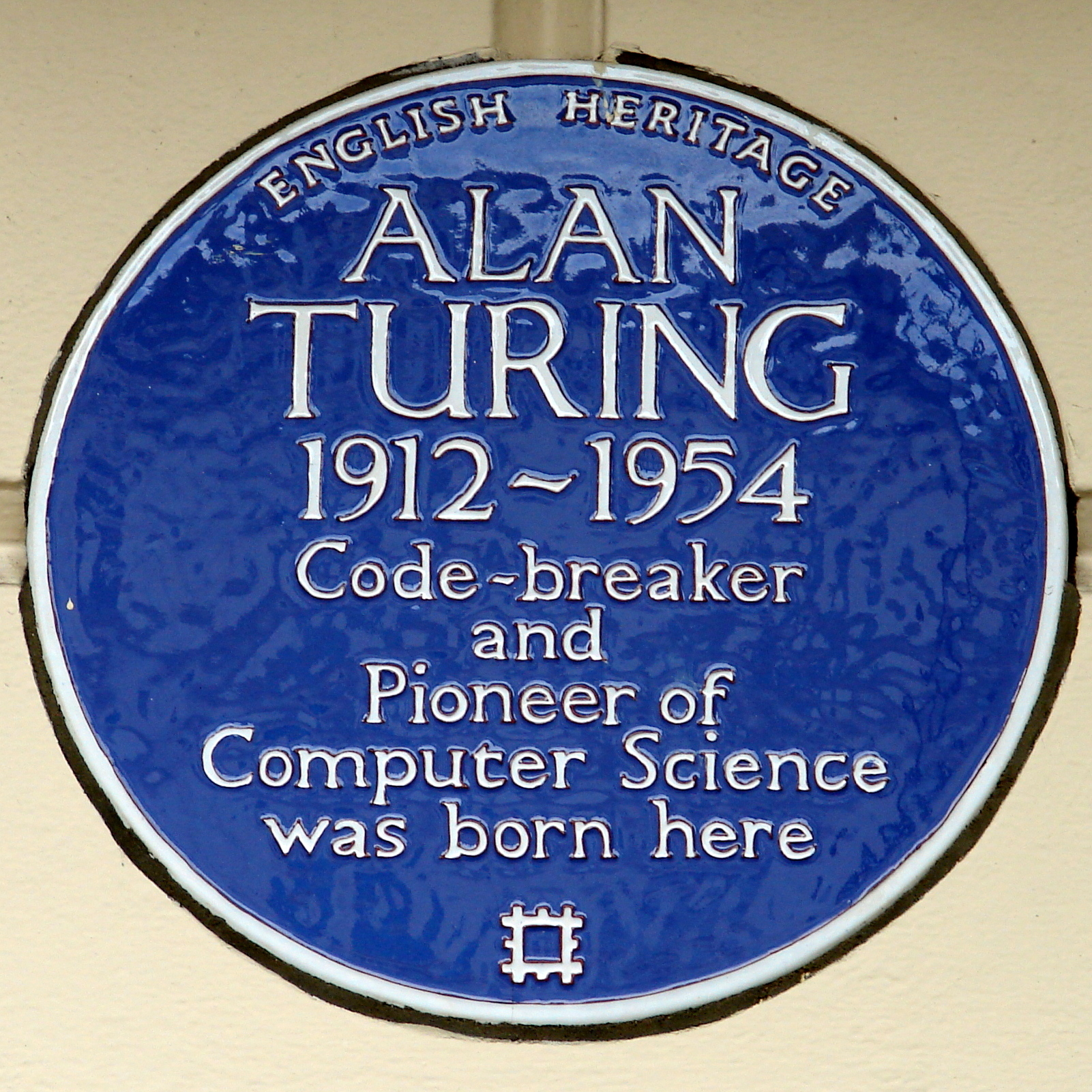
Alan Turing's blue plaque

The hotel started life as two private Victorian residences in 1865 before being turned into a boarding school in 1880. In 1886, it became the Warrington Lodge Medical and Surgery Home for Ladies.

The mathematician Alan Turing was born there in 1912. In 1935 the hospital was converted into The Esplanade Hotel.

Sigmund Freud stayed at the hotel during the summer of 1938 when he was renovating his house in Hampstead. To honour his stay the hotel renamed the best suite the "Sigmund Freud suite".

In 1944, the hotel was bought by the Richards family and its name was changed to the Colonnade Hotel. The hotel changed hands again in 1998 when it was purchased and renovated by the current owners, The Eton Collection.

== Location ==
The hotel's postcode is W9 1ER. The nearest London Underground station is Warwick Avenue on the Bakerloo line.

== Awards ==
- Conde Nast Johanssens Award for Excellence 2002 – Most Excellent London Hotel
- Best Loved Hotels of the World – designated a Best Loved Hotel 2004
