= Threadneedles Hotel =

Hotel in London

- Location within Central London
- Hotel chain: Autograph Collection

General information
- Location: 5 Threadneedle Street, London, EC2R 8AY, United Kingdom
- Coordinates: 51°30′55.94″N 0°5′25″W
- Owner: YTL Hotels

Other information
- Number of rooms: 74
- Number of suites: 6
- Number of restaurants: 1

Website
- www.hotelthreadneedles.co.uk

Threadneedles Hotel, formerly the head offices of the London, City and Midland Bank, is a 5-star London hotel with 74 rooms and suites. The hotel is located opposite the Bank of England on Threadneedle Street. It is a Grade II listed building.

== History ==
The Eton Collection acquired a long-term lease from The Merchant Taylors’ Company and invested £21 million in the refurbishment of the historical building. Threadneedles Hotel was the first luxury hotel within the City of London's Square mile. The hotel's bar is set in the main banking hall of the Midland Bank.
