= Warrington Crescent =

Street in London, England

Coordinates: 51.52549°N 0.18418°W

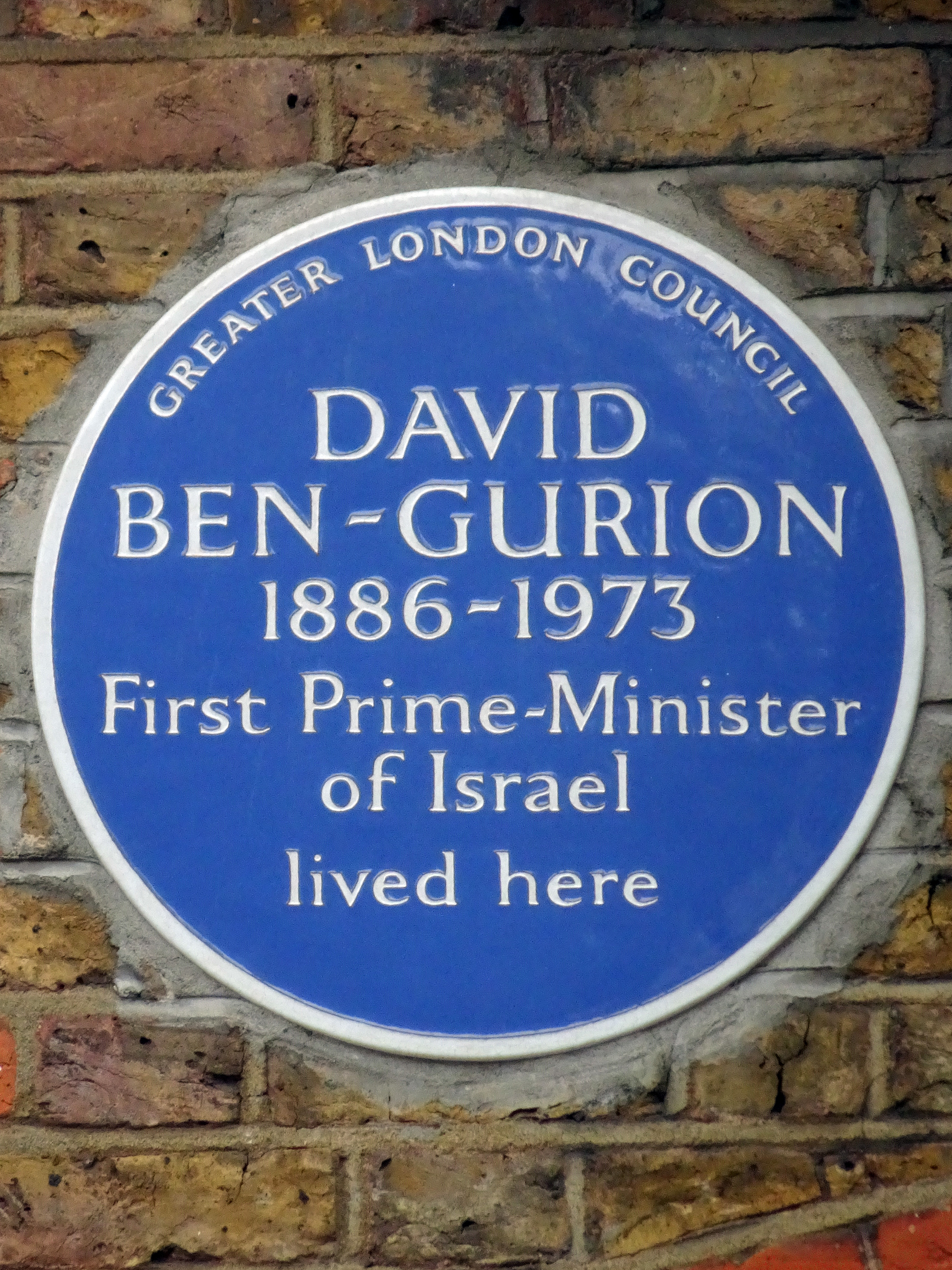
Blue plaque for David Ben-Gurion.

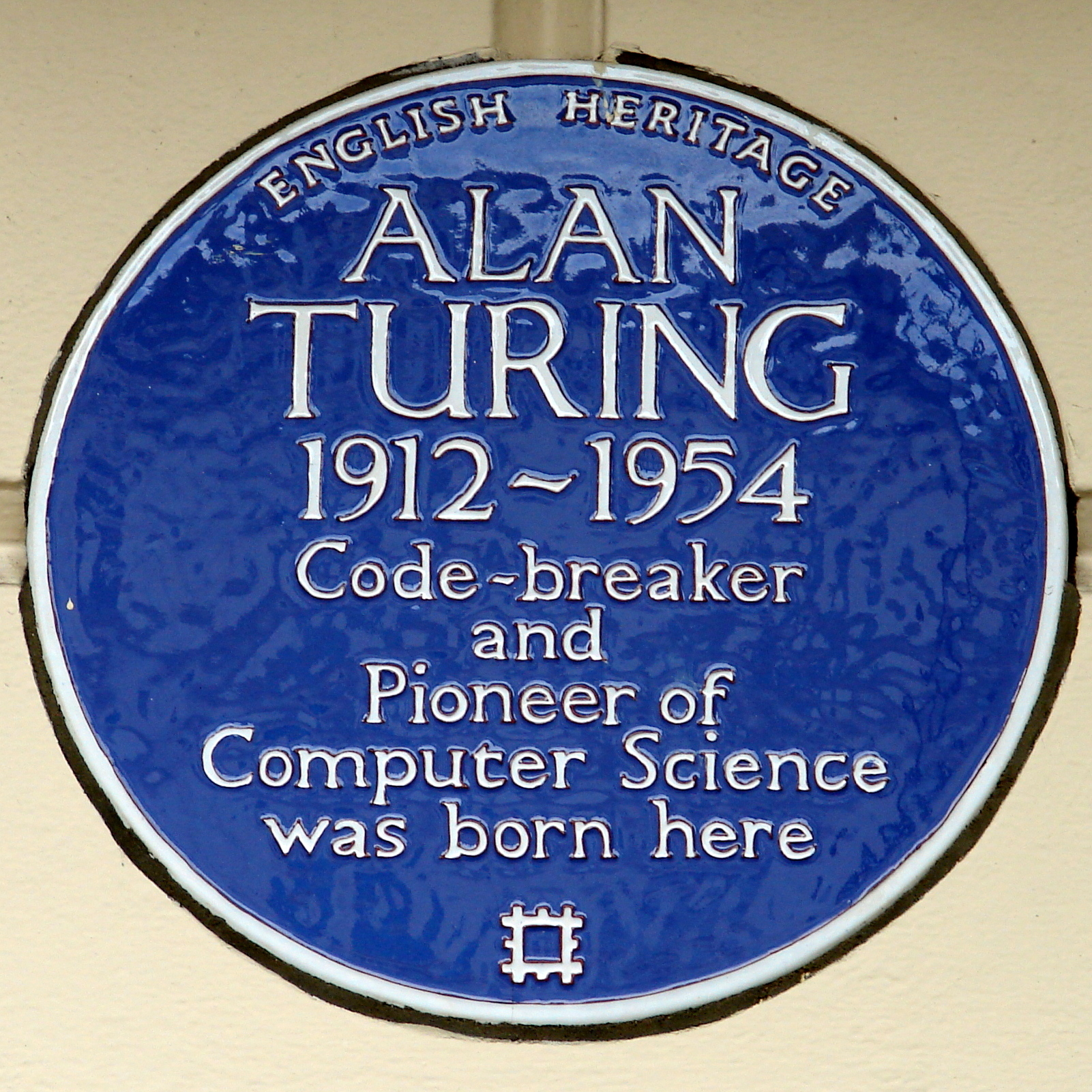
Blue plaque for Alan Turing.

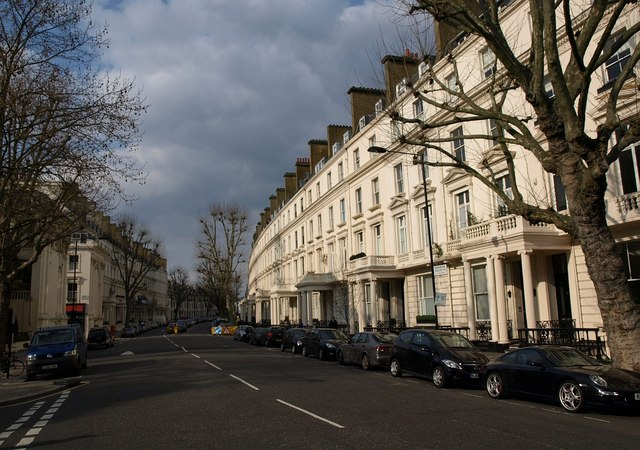
Victorian era white stucco terraces.

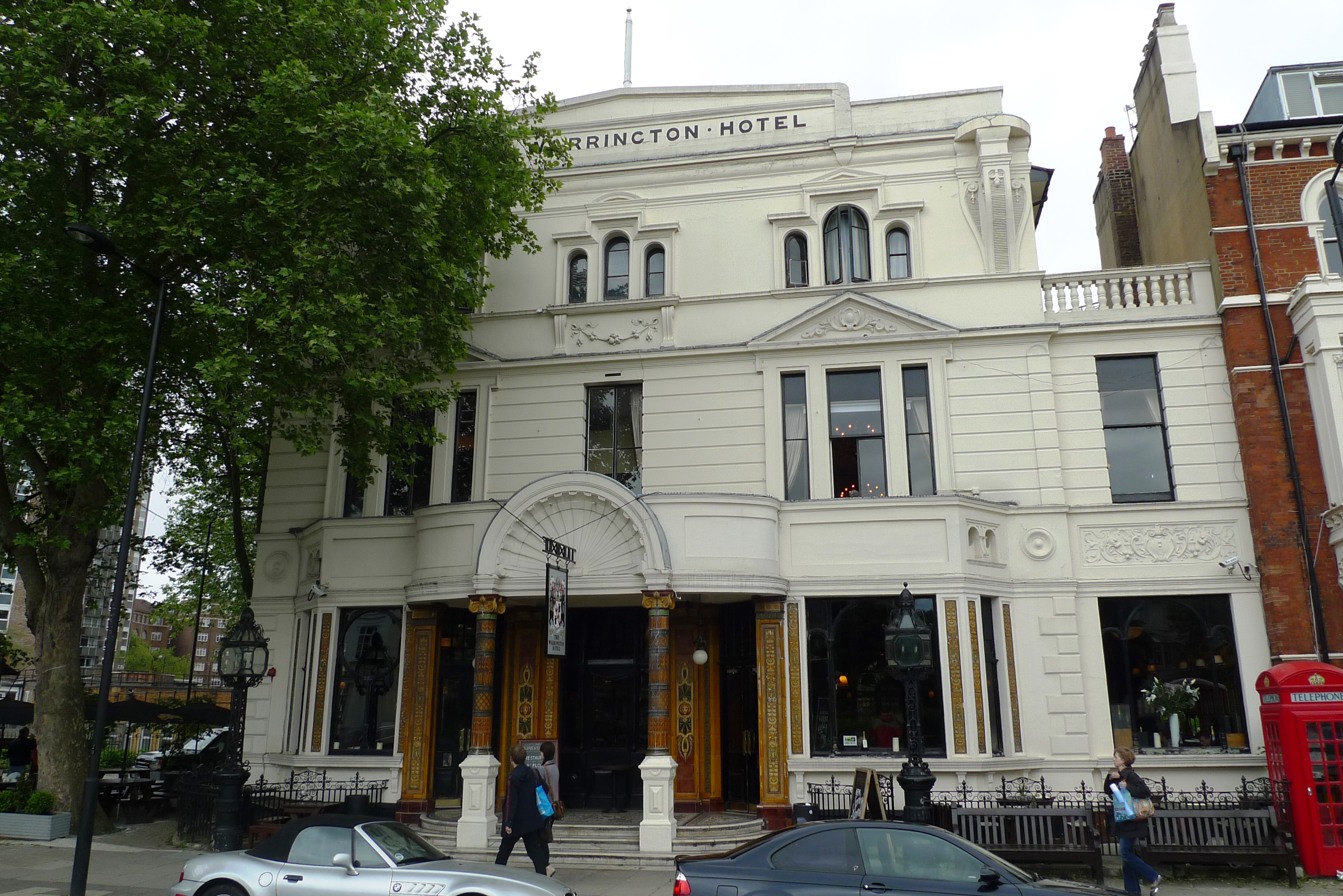
The Warrington Hotel.

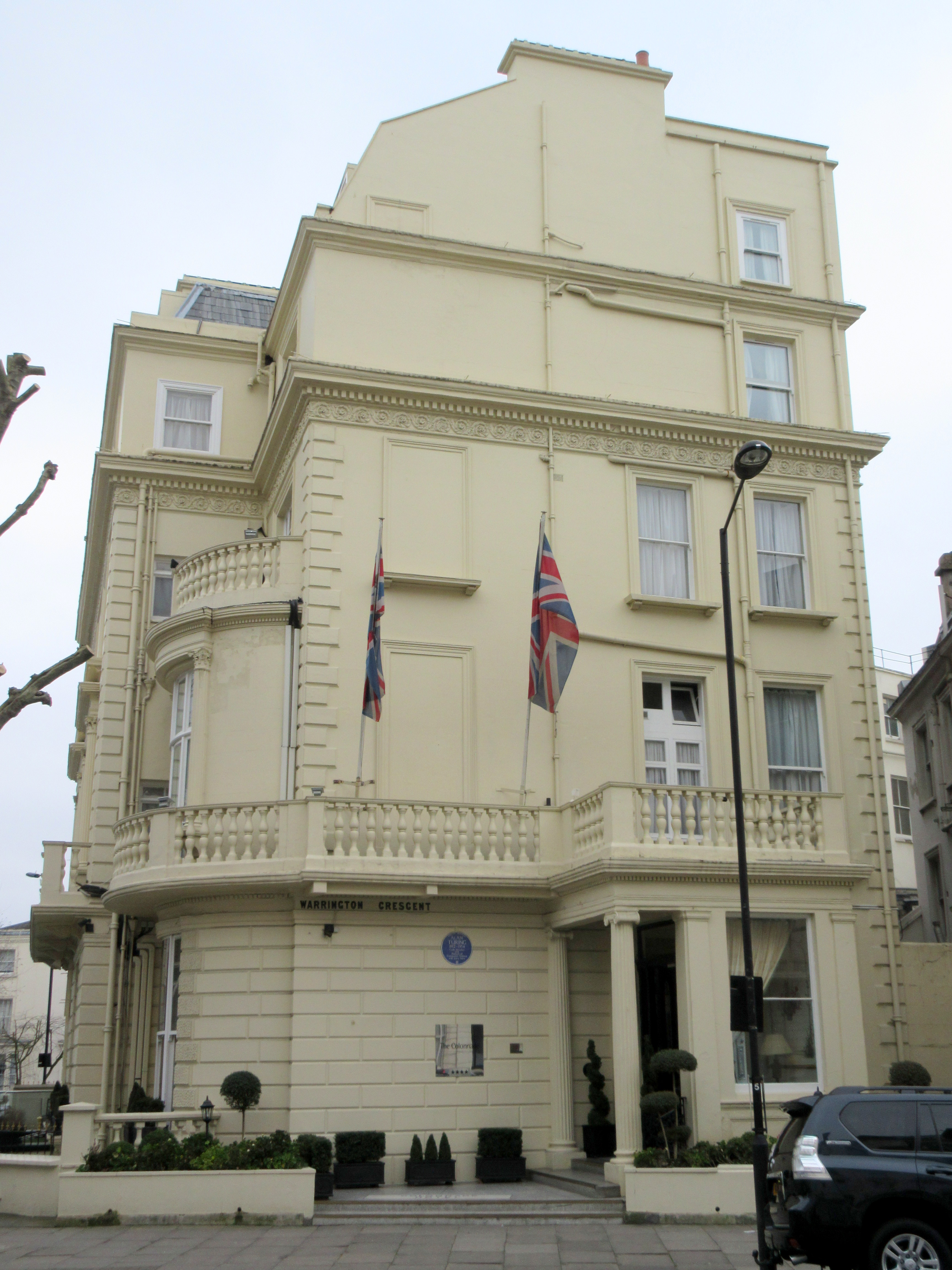
The Colonnade Hotel.

Warrington Crescent is a street in Maida Vale in London. Located in the City of Westminster, it is a crescent curving north eastwards from Warwick Avenue until it reaches a roundabout where it meets including Randolph Avenue, Sutherland Avenue and Lauderdale Road. Warrington Gardens and Formosa Street both lead westwards off Warrington Crescent.

Street layout plans for the area were first drawn up in the 1820s by architect George Gutch in a style similar to Tyburnia next to Hyde Park, but work on Warrington Crescent didn't begin until the Victorian era. Much of the street consists of white stucco terraces.

In 1915 Warwick Avenue tube station was opened where the street meets Warwick Avenue, and was originally planned to be called Warrington Crescent. Nearby towards the southern end of the street are St Saviour's Church and the Colonnade Hotel. At the northern end is the listed Warrington Hotel. Blue plaques commemorate notable former residents David Ben-Gurion, the first Prime Minister of Israel, and the mathematician Alan Turing. The poet John Davidson also lived in the street.

In March 1918 the street was subject to a Zeppelin raid as part of the German bombing of the capital during the First World War. A large bomb fell on Warrington Crescent, destroying or damaging several houses and killing twelve people and wounding many others. The American lyricist Lena Ford, who wrote the words to the popular wartime song "Keep the Home Fires Burning", was killed.

== Bibliography ==
- Bebbington, Gillian. London Street Names. Batsford, 1972.
- Cockburn, J. S., King, H. P. F. & McDonnell, K. G. T. & A History of the County of Middlesex. Institute of Historical Research, 1989.
- Cherry, Bridget & Pevsner, Nikolaus. London 3: North West. Yale University Press, 2002.
- Gough, Barry. Churchill and Fisher: The titans at the Admiralty who fought the First World War. James Lorimer & Company, 2017.
- Hibbert, Christopher Weinreb, Ben, Keay, John & Keay, Julia. The London Encyclopaedia. Pan Macmillan, 2011.
- Holman, Brett. The Next War in the Air: Britain's Fear of the Bomber, 1908–1941. Routledge, 2016.
- White, Jerry. Zeppelin Nights: London in the First World War. Random House, 2014.
