= The Warrington, Maida Vale =

Pub in Maida Vale, London

The Warrington
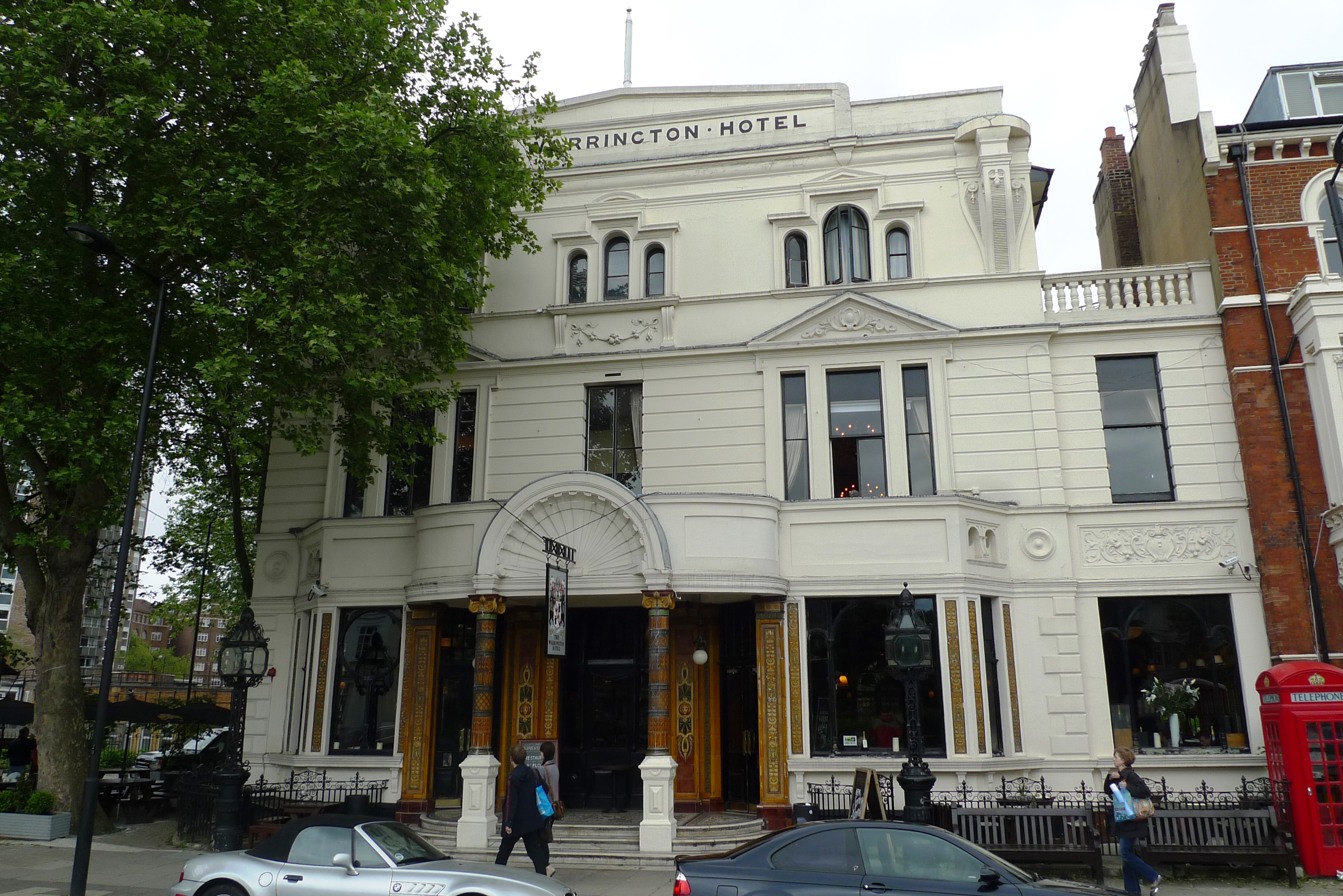
- The Warrington
- Interactive map of The Warrington
- Type: Public house
- Location: Warrington Crescent, Maida Vale, London W9 1EH
- Coordinates: 51°31′37.92″N 0°10′59.16″W

Listed Building – Grade II
- Official name: WARRINGTON HOTEL
- Designated: 05-Feb-1981
- Reference no.: 1066160

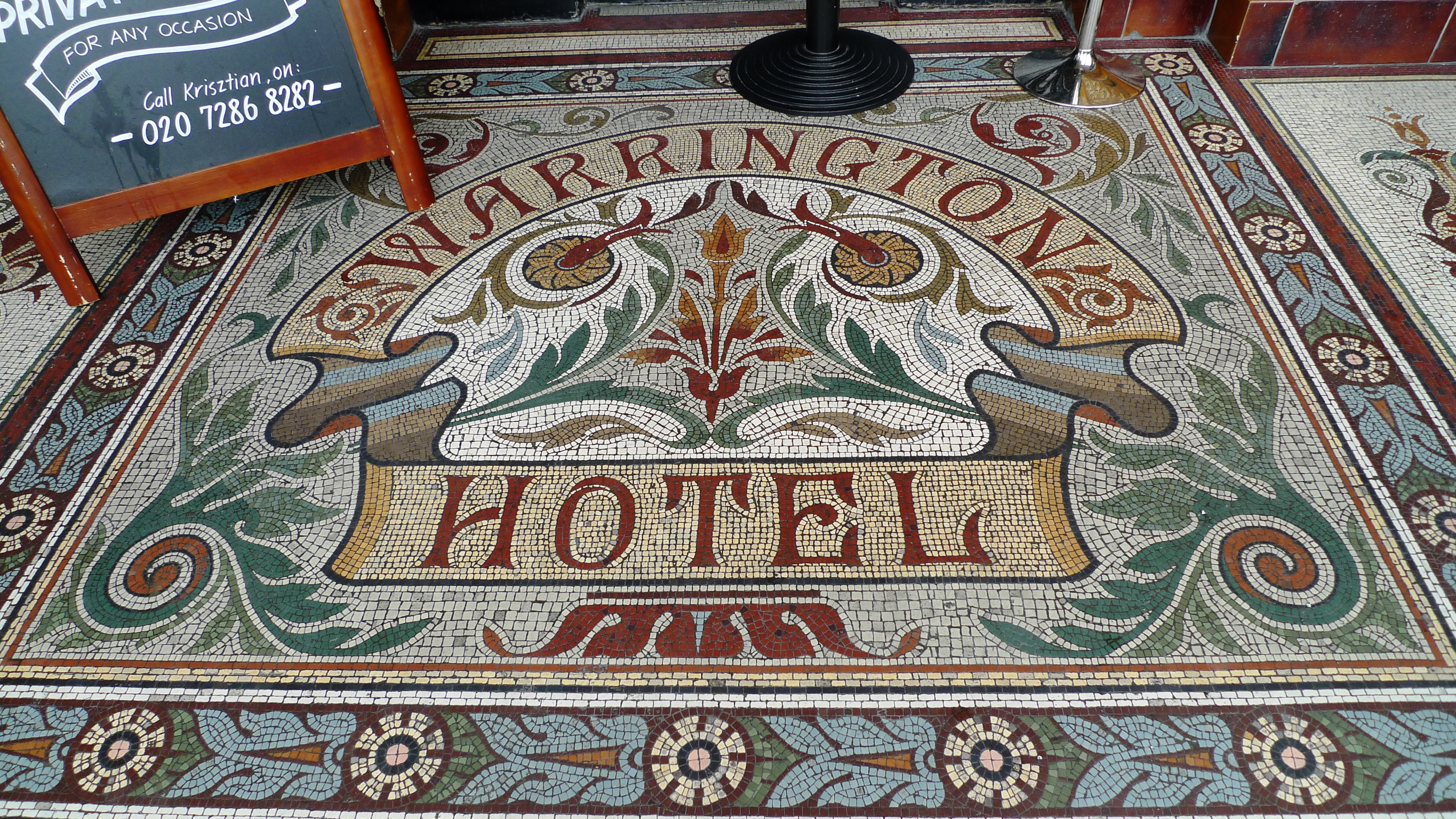
Mosaic in the doorway

The Warrington is a Grade II listed public house at Warrington Crescent, Maida Vale, London W9 1EH. It is on the Campaign for Real Ale's National Inventory of Historic Pub Interiors. The pub was built in the mid-19th century.

It was used in series 1 of The Sweeney (in the episode "Night Out") and in Minder (series 2, episode 7: "The Beer Hunter").

As of August 2015, it was operated by the Faucet Inn pub company. However, the company filed for insolvency as of 8 January 2019. The Warrington was subsequently under the ownership of Golden Brick Pubs Limited.
