= The Eton Collection =

The Eton Collection is a group of three luxury boutique and town house hotels, in the four and five star sector. It was founded in 1998 and has hotels in London and Edinburgh. The group was purchased by Sheikh Mohamed Bin Issa Al Jaber in August 2007.

== List of Eton Collection Hotels ==
- The Academy (London)
- Threadneedles (London)
- The Glasshouse (Edinburgh)
