= Maida Vale =

Residential district in Paddington, London

Coordinates: 51.530°N 0.186°W

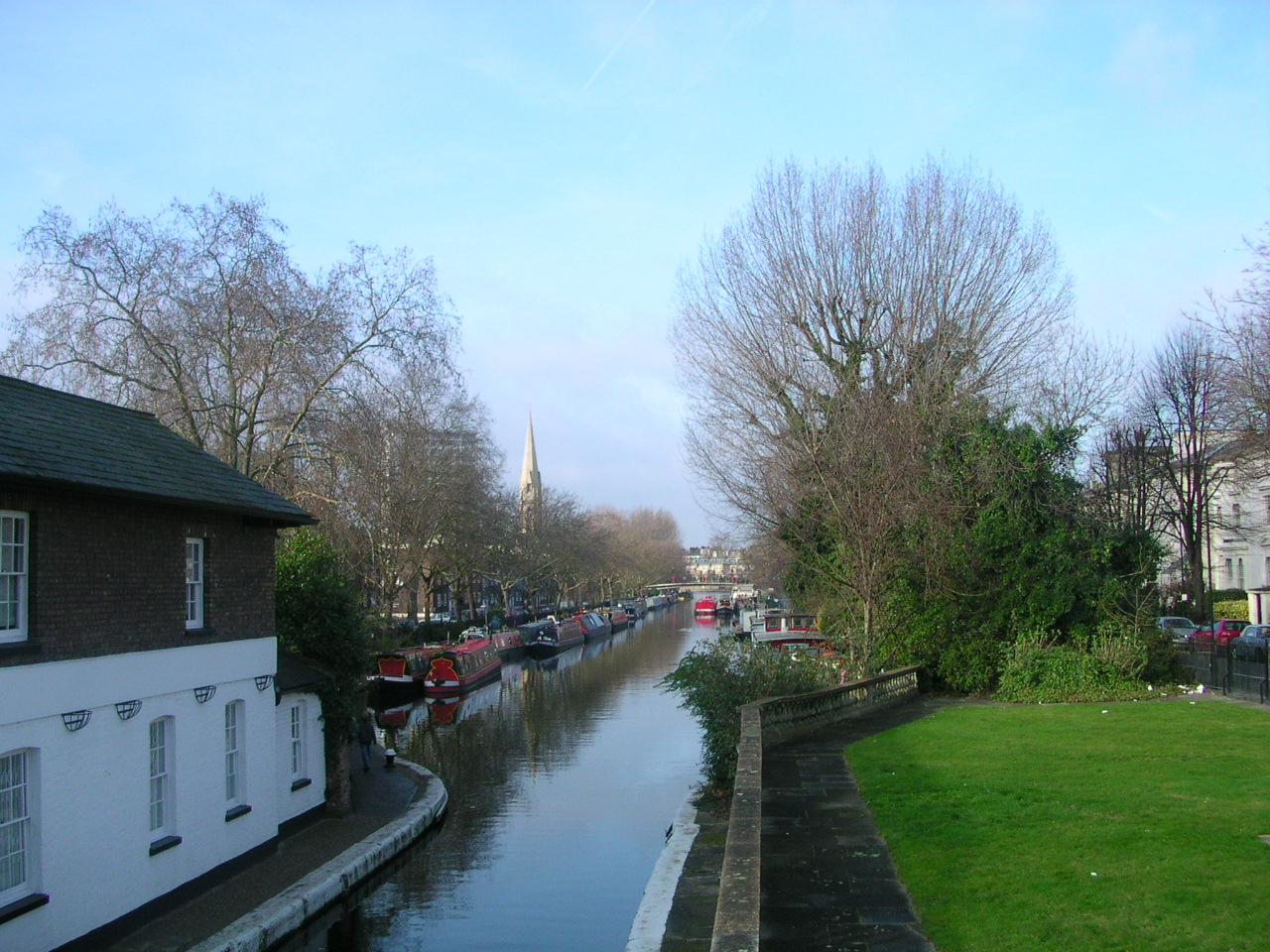
- The Grand Union Canal at Little Venice

- Location within Greater London
- Population: 23,161 (2016 Maida Vale and Little Venice combined Ward populations)
- OS grid reference: TQ255825
- London borough: Westminster
- Ceremonial county: Greater London
- Region: London
- Country: England
- Sovereign state: United Kingdom
- Post town: LONDON
- Postcode district: W9
- Dialling code: 020
- Police: Metropolitan
- Fire: London
- Ambulance: London
- UK Parliament: Queen's Park and Maida Vale
- London Assembly: West Central

Maida Vale (/ˈmeɪdə ˈveɪl/ MAY-də VAYL) is an affluent residential district in Central London, England, north of Paddington, southwest of St John's Wood and south of Kilburn, on Edgware Road. It is part of the City of Westminster and is three miles (five kilometres) northwest of Charing Cross. It has many late Victorian and Edwardian blocks of mansion flats. The area is home to the BBC Maida Vale Studios.

== Toponym ==
The name of the area is derived from a pub and an Italian battle during the Napoleonic Wars. The original pub called The Hero of Maida stood on Edgware Road near the Regent's Canal until it closed in 1992. In the early 19th century, its hanging board displayed the likeness of the Georgian era General Sir John Stuart, under which was the legend Sir John Stuart, the hero of Maida. General Sir John Stuart was made Count of Maida (a town in Calabria) by King Ferdinand IV of Naples and III of Sicily after the British victory at the Battle of Maida in 1806. As the expansion of London gathered pace, the name stuck as the farmland around the pub was used for urban development in the 1820s.

== Geography ==
A map showing the Maida Vale ward of Paddington Metropolitan Borough as it appeared in 1916.

The area is bounded by Maida Avenue and the Regent's Canal to the south, Maida Vale (the road of the same name) to the north-east, Kilburn Park Road to the north-west, and Shirland Road and Blomfield Road to the south-west: an area of around one square kilometre (1/2 square mile). It makes up most of the W9 postal district.

The southern part of Maida Vale, at the junction of Paddington Basin with Regent's Canal with many houseboats, is known as Little Venice. Paddington Recreation Ground is also located in Maida Vale.

The area to the west of Maida Vale, is known as "Maida Hill". It is a recognised postal district bounded by the Avenues on the west, the Regent's Canal to the south, Maida Vale to the east and Kilburn Lane to the north. Parts of Maida Vale were also included in this. The use of the name "Maida Hill" declined, but increased again since the mid-2000s as the 414 bus route (from 2005 to 2021) gave its destination as Maida Hill, and a new Maida Hill market was introduced on the square at the junction of Elgin Avenue and Harrow Road. Maida Hill is also known as "West Kilburn", with the two names being used interchangeably.

Just to the east of Maida Vale is St John's Wood, with Lord's Cricket Ground.

== History ==
The area was previously owned by the Church, initially as part of St Margaret's, Westminster, then later by the Bishop of London after the Dissolution of the Monasteries.

In 1742, a lease for future development was signed by Sir John Frederick. His daughter later married Robert Thistlethwaite, a Hampshire landowner, whose Hampshire holdings including Widley and Wymering are commemorated in Maida Vale street names.

In 1816, an act of Parliament allowed the trustees of Sir John Frederick's estate and the Bishop of London to begin developing the area. This began in the 1820s with development along Edgware Road. The area was first named on maps as Maida Vale in 1827. John Gutch, surveyor to the Bishop of London, produced a plan for the area in 1827, which roughly corresponds to current road alignments.

By 1868, a stretch of Edgware Road near the area had been officially named Maida Vale. In 1960, the ownership of the area's freehold passed from the Bishop of London to the Ecclesiastical Commissioners, whose function was to administer the church's assets.

In the late 19th and early 20th centuries, Maida Vale was a significant Sephardic Jewish district, to the extent that an 1878 magazine report reported that it was commonly called "New Jerusalem". The 1896 Spanish & Portuguese Synagogue, a Grade II listed building and headquarters of the British Sephardi community, is on Lauderdale Road. The actor Alec Guinness was born on this road. The first Prime Minister of Israel, David Ben-Gurion, lived within sight of this synagogue on Warrington Crescent. The pioneer of modern computing, Alan Turing, was born at what is now the Colonnade Hotel in Warrington Crescent.

Maida Vale tube station was opened on 6 June 1915 on the Bakerloo line. Warwick Avenue tube station on the same line had been opened a few months earlier.

== BBC Studios ==
Maida Vale is home to some of BBC network radio's recording and broadcast studios. The building on Delaware Road is one of the BBC's earliest premises, pre-dating Broadcasting House, and was the centre of the BBC radio news service during World War II. The building houses seven music and radio drama studios. Most famously it was home to John Peel's BBC Radio 1 Peel Sessions and the BBC Radiophonic Workshop.

In 2018, the BBC announced plans to close the Maida Vale studios and relocate its functions to east London.

== Little Venice ==
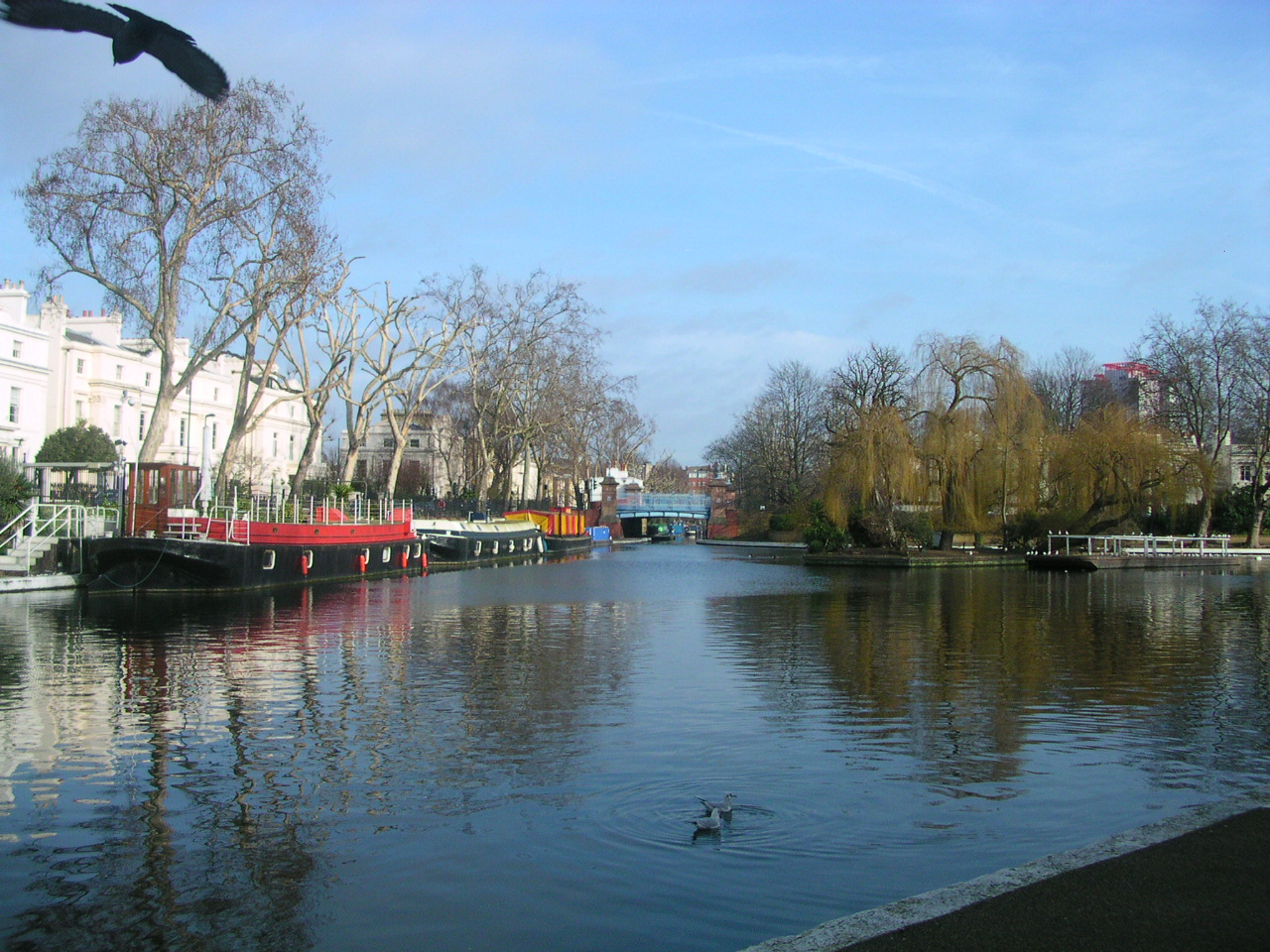
The canal junction at Little Venice

Little Venice is a comparatively recent name for parts of Maida Vale and Paddington in the City of Westminster. It consists of the area surrounding the Little Venice basin and its canals. It is known for its Regency style white stucco buildings and its canals and moored boats. The name Little Venice is applied to Maida Avenue, Warwick Crescent and Blomfield Road, and the streets in the south of Maida Vale overlooking Browning's Pool, including the section of Randolph Avenue south of Warrington Crescent.

According to one story, the poet Robert Browning, who lived in the area from 1862 to 1887, coined the name. However, this was disputed by Lord Kinross in 1966 and by London Canals. Both assert that Lord Byron (1788–1824) humorously coined the name, which now applies more loosely to a longer reach of the canal system. Browning's Pool is named after the poet. It forms the junction of Regent's Canal and the Paddington Arm of the Grand Union Canal.

South Maida Vale, a prime residential area, also has a reputation for shops and restaurants and for the Canal Cafe Theatre, the Puppet Theatre Barge, the Waterside Café and the Warwick Castle pub. A waterbus service operates from Little Venice eastwards round Regent's Park, calling at London Zoo and on towards Camden Town. The Inland Waterways Association has hosted since 1983 a Canalway Cavalcade in Little Venice.

== Other areas ==
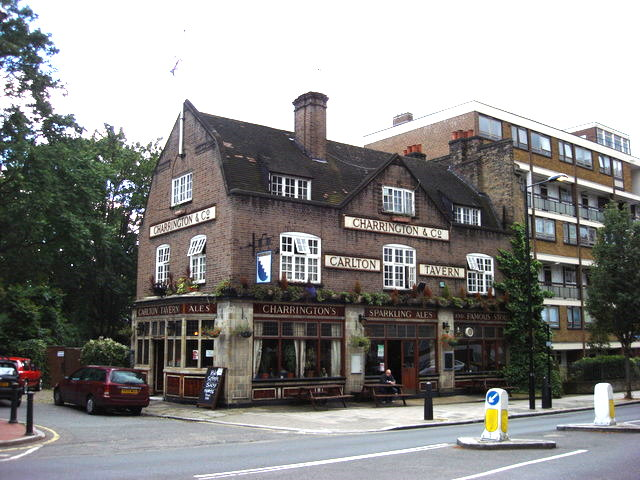
The Carlton Tavern (1921) is an example of 1920s architecture. The pub was demolished in 2015 but subsequently rebuilt following a community campaign and planning appeals.

Maida Vale is noted for wide tree-lined avenues, large communal gardens and red-brick mansion blocks from the late Victorian and Edwardian eras. The first mansion blocks were completed in 1897, with the arrival of the identically designed Lauderdale Mansions South, Lauderdale Mansions West and Lauderdale Mansions East in Lauderdale Road. Others followed in neighbouring streets: Elgin Mansions (Elgin Avenue) and Leith Mansions (Grantully Road) in 1900, Ashworth Mansions (Elgin Avenue and Grantully Road) and Castellain Mansions (Castellain Road) in 1902, Elgin Court (Elgin Avenue) and Carlton Mansions (Randolph Avenue) in 1902, Delaware Mansions (Delaware Road) and Biddulph Mansions (Elgin Avenue and Biddulph Road) in 1907 and Randolph Court in 1910.

Among the buildings of architectural interest is the Carlton Tavern, a pub on Carlton Vale. Built in 1920–1921 for Charrington Brewery, it is thought to be the work of the architect Frank J. Potter and is noted for its 1920s interiors and faience tiled exterior. The building was being considered by Historic England for Grade II listing when it was unexpectedly demolished in March 2015 by the property developer CLTX Ltd to make way for a block of flats. The pub was subsequently rebuilt and re-opened following a community campaign and planning appeals.

== Demography ==
Maida Vale has a namesake electoral ward and in the 2022 local election returned three Labour councillors for Westminster City Council. The 2011 census counted a population of 10,210 in the ward. In terms of ethnicity, 62.4% of the population were White (38% British, 3% Irish, 22% Other), 11.7% were Asian, and 7.1% were Black. Maida Vale also had a large Arab community, who formed 9.2% of the population, and by far the most spoken foreign language was Arabic. Of the 4,480 households, the number of homes owned or privately rented were about even, with socially rented a bit less but still significant. Properties are predominantly in the flats/maisonettes/apartments category (over 90 percent of the households). The median age was 33. Being in the inner city, the majority of residents do not own a car or van.

== Religion ==
Local places of worship include St Saviour's Church, Warwick Avenue, a building constructed in 1972–1976 in a "modern" style. The latter building was referred to by some local residents as "the God Box". St Luke's Church on Fernhead Road was built in 1877, but destroyed in an air raid in 1940 and subsequently rebuilt. The church featured in Graham Greene's 1955 novella Loser Takes All. It is an active church.

Lauderdale Road Synagogue, a Sephardic Jewish place of worship, is in Maida Vale.

== Notable people ==
=== Commemorative plaques ===
- Edward Ardizzone (1900–1979), artist and illustrator, at 130 Elgin Avenue.
- Roger Bannister (1929–2018), English athlete and neurologist, trained to break the 4-minute mile at the track in Paddington Rec while a medical student at St Mary's hospital.
- David Ben-Gurion (1886–1973), first prime minister of Israel, at 75 Warrington Crescent.
- Lennox Berkeley (1900–1989), composer, lived at 8 Warwick Avenue.
- Ambrose Fleming (1849–1945), English electrical engineer and physicist, at 9 Clifton Gardens.
- Alec Guinness (1914–2000), English actor, born at 155 Lauderdale Mansions.
- Henry Hall (1898–1989), British dance band leader, at 8 Randolph Mews in 1959–1981.
- Andreas Kalvos (1792–1869), Greek poet and patriot, at 182 Sutherland Avenue.
- Lupino Lane (1892–1959), theatre and film star, at 32 Maida Vale.
- Arthur Lowe (1915–1982), English actor, famed for his role as Captain George Mainwaring in the television show Dad's Army, at 2 Maida Hill West in 1969–1982.
- Tony Meehan (1943–2005), founder member of the guitar group The Shadows, lived at 34 Lauderdale Mansions on Lauderdale Road in 1977–2005.
- Alan Turing (1912–1954), code-breaker and pioneer of computer science, at 2 Warrington Crescent.

=== Other notable people ===
See also People from Maida Vale

- Hardy Amies (1909–2003), fashion designer, dressmaker to Queen Elizabeth II.
- George Arliss (1868–1946), actor, at 1 Clifton Villas.
- Marc Bolan (b. 1947) lived at 31 Clarendon Gardens in the late 1960s
- Abdel-Majed Abdel Bary (b. 1991), suspected Islamist militant.
- Björk (b. 1965), Icelandic singer, resident in the 1990s and early 2000s.
- Joanna Mary Boyce (1831–1861), portrait painter, born in Maida Vale.
- Vera Brittain (1893–1970), writer, at 111 Wymering Mansions, Wymering Road.
- Sandra Caron (1936–2025), actress, lived at Douglas House on Maida Avenue from 1998 to 2018.
- Helen Clare (1916–2018), singer, was living at 88 Maida Vale in 1939.
- Ernest Clark (1912–1994), actor, born and raised in Maida Vale.
- Charles Coborn (1852–1945), music hall entertainer, lived at 27 Elgin Mansions.
- Jarvis Cocker (b. 1963) of Pulp was living in the area in 1997.
- Joan Collins (b. 1933) grew up in Maida Vale.
- Delia Derbyshire (1937–2001), in Clifton Road during her time with the BBC Radiophonic Workshop.
- Elizabeth Emanuel (b. 1953), fashion designer, lives in the area.
- Mohammed Emwazi (1988–2015), alleged executioner for Islamic State known as "Jihadi John", attended St Mary Magdalene Church of England Primary School in Maida Vale.
- Terence Fisher (1904–1980), film director, born in Maida Vale.
- Michael Flatley (b. 1958), dancer and creator of Riverdance etc., owned a house in Park Place Villas, near the Regent's Canal, until 2004.
- Edward Fox (b. 1937), film actor, has lived in Maida Avenue, by the Regent's Canal, from the 1970s to the present-day.
- Alan Freeman (1927–2006), broadcaster.
- Noel Gallagher (b. 1967), singer, songwriter and guitarist.
- Sir Edward German (1862–1936), composer, lived at 5 Biddulph Road from 1921 until his death in 1936.
- Victor Gollancz (1893–1967), publisher and humanitarian, born at 256 Elgin Avenue, Maida Vale.
- Eva Green (b. 1980), actress.
- Leslie Green (1875–1908), architect, was born in Maida Vale.
- Clifford Grey (1887–1941), musical theatre composer, at 38 Sandringham Court.
- Philip Guedalla (1889–1944), writer, politician and barrister, born in Maida Vale.
- Lieutenant Leonard Keysor VC (1885–1951), Australian soldier, born in Maida Vale.
- Irene Handl (1901–1987), character actress, born in Maida Vale.
- John Inman (1935–2007), actor, lived in a mews house in Little Venice for 30 years.
- Walter Kolarz (1912–1962), communist scholar, in Maida Vale from 1940 until his death.
- Brian Lawrance (1909–1983), Australian-born bandleader and vocalist, lived in Florence Court in 1939.
- Philip Lawrence (1947–1995), head teacher at St George's Catholic School in Maida Vale at the time of his murder in December 1995.
- Eddie Linden (1935–2023), poet and founder of Aquarius magazine, which he edited from his Sutherland Avenue home.
- James MacColl (1908–1971), Labour MP for Widnes, at 21 Randolph Road.
- John Masefield (1878–1967), novelist, playwright and Poet Laureate from 1930, at 30 Maida Avenue.
- Jimmy McCulloch (1953–1979) of the rock band Wings died at his flat there.
- Ben Miller (b. 1966), comedian and actor.
- Nancy Mitford (1904–1973), author, at 13 Blomfield Road in the 1930s.
- James Payn (1830–1898), novelist and journal editor, died at his home, 43 Warrington Crescent, on 25 March 1898.
- Esmé Percy (1887–1957), actor, at 30 Warrington Crescent.
- Lou Preager (1906–1978), British dance band leader, at 198 Wymering Mansions, Wymering Road in the 1930s.
- Raphael Ravenscroft, (b.1954) Saxophonist who played the solo on Gerry Rafferty's "Baker Street" lived at 27A Bristol Gardens 2011–2014
- Ruth Rendell (1930–2015), Baroness Rendell of Babergh, the English crime novelist, lived in the area.
- Daisy Ridley (b. 1992), actress.
- Mstislav Rostropovich (1927–2007), cellist, at 18 Randolph Crescent.
- Julia Smith (1927–1997), television producer, was born at 174 Sutherland Avenue.
- Enrica Soma (1929–1969), Italian-American socialite and ballerina, one-time wife of John Huston and mother of Anjelica Huston, moved there with her children in 1962 after separating from her husband.
- Charles Spencer, 9th Earl Spencer (b. 1964), peer, author and younger brother of Diana, Princess of Wales, has a residence in Maida Vale.
- Joe Strummer (1952–2002) of punk rock band the Clash lived there.
- Kate Stewart (b. 1995), singer-songwriter
- Brian Eno (b. 1948), musician and producer, lived in Maida Vale in the 1970s and 1980s.
- Sir John Tenniel (1820–1914), artist and cartoonist, at 10 Portsdown Road (subsequently renamed Randolph Avenue), Maida Hill in 1854–1909.
- John Lawrence Toole (1830–1906), comic actor, lived in Maida Vale.
- Alexander Walker (1930–2003), Evening Standard film critic, at 1 Marlborough, 38–40 Maida Vale.
- Bradley Wiggins (b. 1980), cyclist
- Konni Zilliacus (1894–1967), Labour MP for Manchester Gorton and author
- Angela Allen (script supervisor)
