= Warwick Hall =

Coordinates: 54°54′15″N 02°50′01″W

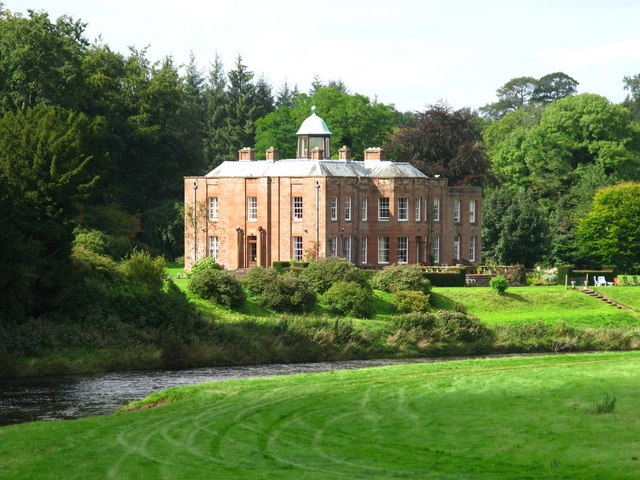
Warwick Hall

Warwick Hall is a large country house located on the banks of the River Eden at Warwick-on-Eden in Cumbria, England, United Kingdom.

== History ==
The original Warwick Hall was occupied by the Warwick family until it ceased to exist when Ann Warwick died unmarried in 1774. The Warwick family were catholic and attended to by Benedictine priests who lived in the hall. The original hall was substantially rebuilt in 1828.

After the original hall was destroyed by fire in 1936 a new hall was constructed in the neo-Georgian style by John Laing & Son. The rebuilding was commissioned by Colonel Guy Elwes and the hall remained in the Elwes family until Mrs Aileen Elwes (daughter of Charles Liddell and niece of Alice Dease) died in 1996. It is now a country house hotel.

== Sources ==
- Ritchie, Berry (1997). The Good Builder: The John Laing Story. James & James.
