= Warwick Avenue, London =

Street in Maida Vale, London

Coordinates: 51°31′21.95″N 0°10′58.9″W

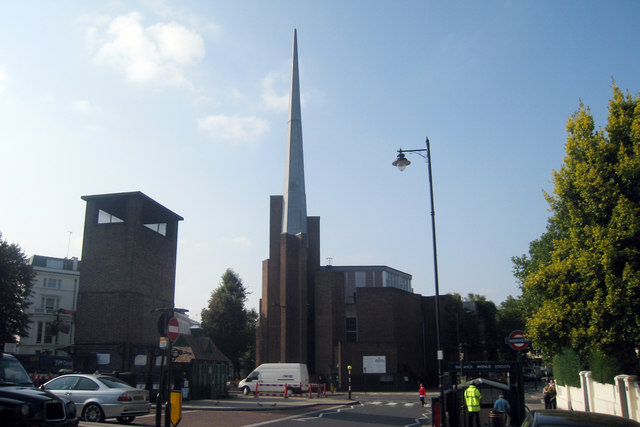
St Saviour Church on Warwick Avenue, near to the entrance of Warwick Avenue tube station

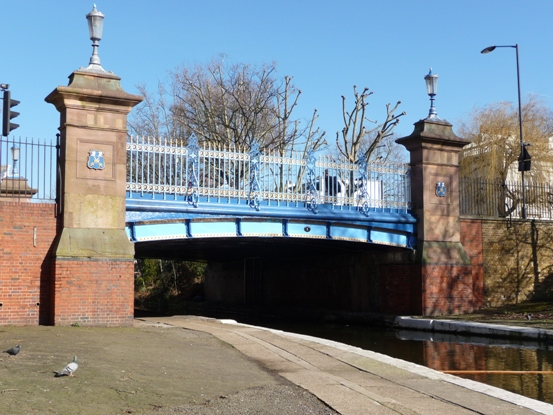
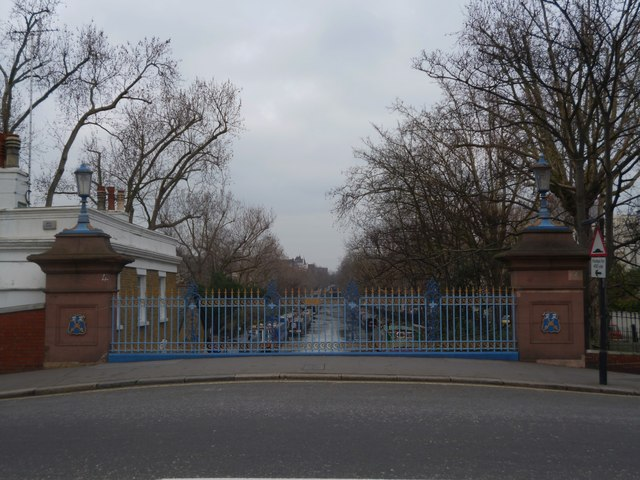
Views of and from the Warwick Avenue bridge over the Regent's Canal

Warwick Avenue is a residential avenue in the Little Venice area of Maida Vale, London. Its southern end is situated adjacent to Paddington Basin, to the north of Paddington station.

The street, originally called Green Lane and then Warwick Road, before being renamed Warwick Avenue, was named after Jane Warwick of Warwick Hall, Cumbria, whose father-in-law was John Morehead, who in turn was the son-in-law of Robert Thistlethwaite, who leased the land.

At the junction of Warwick Avenue with Warrington Crescent and Clifton Gardens is the Anglican Church of St Saviour, consecrated in 1856 but rebuilt in a modern style from 1973 to 1976. The church was used for the wedding scenes in the promotional video for The Human League hit "Love Action (I Believe in Love)".

Warwick Avenue tube station, a London Underground station on the Bakerloo line, is located on the street.

Warwick Avenue houses one of the remaining thirteen Grade II listed Cabmen's Shelters used by London's taxi drivers as a place to buy food and (non-alcoholic) drink. Also Grade II listed is the bridge over the Regent's Canal which Warwick Avenue crosses.

"Warwick Avenue", a 2008 single from the album Rockferry by Duffy, took its name from the location after the singer accidentally alighted at Warwick Avenue tube station when unfamiliar with the London Underground.

== Notable residents ==
- As founding secretary of the newly formed Society for the Protection of Birds, later Royal Society for the Protection of Birds, in 1891 the home of Hannah Poland at 29 Warwick Avenue was the first official address of the organisation.
- John Julius Norwich's London home was a detached Victorian house in Warwick Avenue.
- The Australian actress Leal Douglas (1881–1970) lived at 54, Warwick Avenue.
