= Peninsula Community Health =

English community interest company

Peninsula Community Health was a community interest company created in October 2011 as not-for-profit service provider by Cornwall and Isles of Scilly Primary Care Trust.

It ran 14 community hospitals in Cornwall: Bodmin Hospital, Camborne Redruth Community Hospital, St Ives (Edward Hain Community Hospital), Falmouth, Fowey, Helston, Launceston, Liskeard, Newquay, Penzance (Poltair Community Hospital), St Austell, Saltash (St Barnabas Community Hospital), Isles Of Scilly (St Mary's Community Hospital), and Bude (Stratton Community Hospital). In July 2015, it decided to give up the hospital contract as uneconomic.

Andrew George, MP for St Ives, and the local campaign group Health Initiative Cornwall criticised community hospitals being taken out of the NHS and welcomed the idea of merging the company with the NHS providers in Cornwall, Cornwall Partnership NHS Foundation Trust and Royal Cornwall Hospitals NHS Trust.

In May 2013, it set up a new company, PCH Dental, to deliver community dental services in Cornwall and the Isles of Scilly.

The ten beds at Poltair Hospital were closed in 2014. The local campaign group West Cornwall HealthWatch says the "service is almost at breaking point, with no sign of an early improvement", but according to the Clinical Commissioning Group "Beds continue to be available at Edward Hain and Helston community hospitals for anyone who needs one." Campaigners claim "They are running at dangerously high 95 per cent occupancy levels, are unable to accept patients from the acute sector who need re-enablement, and are unable to discharge patients due to a lack of nursing home beds and care-at-home services."

A Care Quality Commission inspection in 2015 found good safe care was provided across community inpatient, adult, urgent care, and children and young people’s services, but end of life care services were rated “requires improvement” in relation to safety.

Nearly 2,000 staff and all of the assets were transferred to Cornwall Partnership NHS Foundation Trust on 31 March 2016. The Poltair hospital was sold.

== See also ==
- Healthcare in Cornwall
- List of NHS trusts
