= Jacquetta Marshall =

British politician and first woman Lord Mayor of Plymouth

Jacquetta Marshall OBE (7 November 1878 – 28 December 1961) was the first female Lord Mayor of Plymouth in 1950–51.

== Early life ==
Jacquetta Hosking was born in St Ive in 1878, the daughter of William Hosking and his wife Maria (née Warrick). She grew up in the village of Pensilva. She was named Jacquetta after a character in a novel.

She married Richard Marshall (1876–1949) in 1896. They had two children, a son (Octave Roy) and a daughter (Marcie). Marshall was a suffragette in Plymouth, although in 1950 the Plymouth suffragette Eliza Aitken-Davies suggested that Marshall had been a suffragist rather than a more militant suffragette.

== Councillor, Alderman and Lord Mayor ==
Marshall was an unsuccessful Labour candidate for the St Andrew's Ward in 1924. She was elected as a Councillor for Sutton Ward in 1925. She was appointed Alderman in 1950 and Lord Mayor 1950–51. A lightweight robe and a featherless tricorn hat were made for her on her election as Lord Mayor. She only had a telephone installed in her house when she became Lord Mayor. She retired as an Alderman and from the Council in 1961.

Marshall was chairman of Moorhaven Hospital Management Committee, vice-chairman of Plymouth, South Devon, and East Cornwall Hospital Management Committee, and a member of the South West Regional Hospital Board. She was awarded the OBE in 1955. Lady Astor was awarded the Freedom of the City in 1959, but the Labour Councillors boycotted the event because the Conservative Councillors had refused to award Marshall the Freedom at the same time.

== Personal life ==
Marshall died at her daughter's home in Guildford in 1961, aged 85.

== Legacy ==
A gold medal in Marshall's name was awarded annually from 1951 to the most outstanding nurse at the Freedom Fields section of the South Devon and East Cornwall Hospital, Plymouth; the £100 cost of the medal was borne by Lady Astor, in acknowledgement of the difficulties of being the first woman to hold any particular office.
