= Home Park =

Football stadium in Plymouth, England

- "The Theatre of Greens" "The Jan Siro"
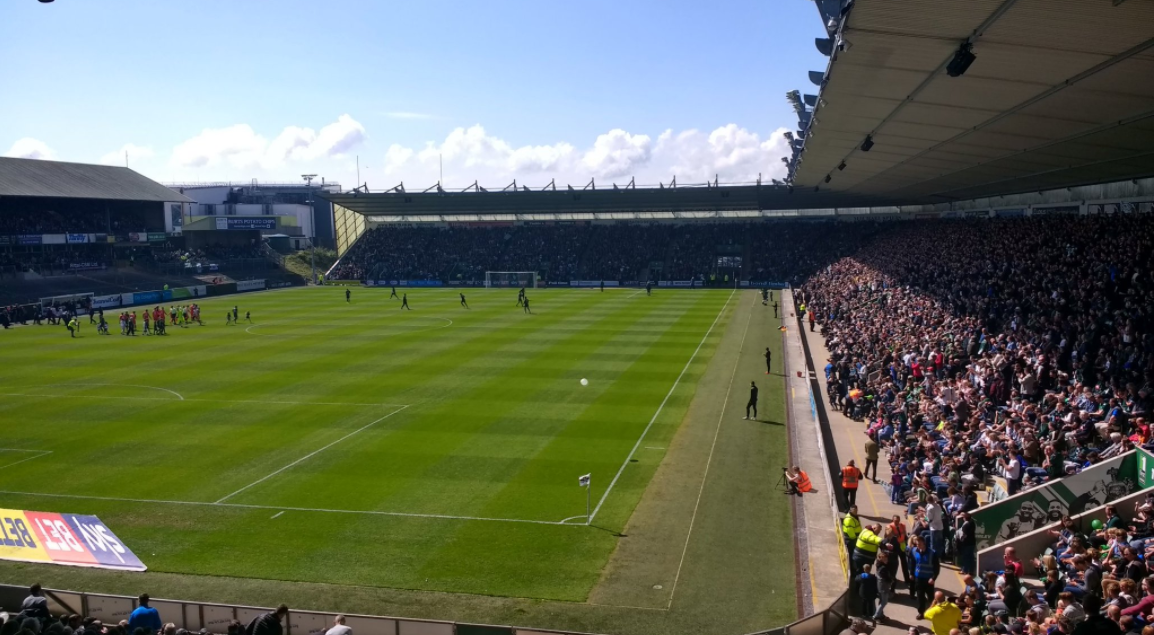
- Interactive map of Home Park
- Address: Mayflower Drive
- Location: Milehouse; Plymouth, England; PL2 3DQ
- Coordinates: 50°23′17″N 4°09′3″W
- Owner: Plymouth Argyle F.C.
- Operator: Plymouth Argyle F.C.
- Capacity: 17,900 (17,000 usable for matches)
- Surface: SIS Grass Hybrid
- Scoreboard: Bendac infiLED screen
- Record attendance: 43,587; Plymouth Argyle vs Aston Villa, 10 October 1936
- Field size: 105 x 70 m (114 x 78 yd)

Construction
- Built: 1892
- Opened: 1893
- Renovated: 2001, 2019
- Cost: £11m (2001) & £10m (2019)
- Architects: Leitch Company (1951); Barr Construction (2001); GL Events (2019)

Tenants
- Devonport Albion R.F.C. (1893-94); Plymouth R.F.C. (1894-99); Argyle F.C. (1900–1903); Plymouth Argyle F.C. (1903–present)

Website
- homeparkstadium.com

Home Park is a football stadium in the area of Milehouse, Plymouth, Devon, England. With a capacity of 17,900, the ground has been the home of Plymouth Argyle Football Club since 1903, and was also used between 1900 and 1903 by Argyle Athletic club and Argyle F.C. and for athletics and rugby. The amateur Argyle F.C. later formed the modern-day professional Plymouth Argyle F.C. in 1903.

After undergoing considerable development in the 1920s and 1930s, the ground suffered heavy damage in World War II. It reopened in time for the resumption of the Football League in 1945, and underwent further improvements in the 1950s, including the installation of floodlights and a new double-decker grandstand. The ground remained relatively unchanged until 2001, when construction of three new all-seater stands began. Temporary solutions saw the stadium become all-seater in the summer of 2007, before the Mayflower Grandstand, the oldest part of the ground, was redeveloped in 2019.

The stadium's record attendance was in 1936, when 43,596 spectators watched the club play a Second Division match against Aston Villa. The record average attendance for a single season, 23,290, came in the 1946–47 season. The stadium was selected as part of England's 2018 FIFA World Cup bid by the FA in December 2009. The ground has played host to England youth internationals, and a UEFA Cup Winners' Cup match between Saint-Étienne and Manchester United in 1977. Home Park has also hosted Rugby union and athletics, and live music in the summer, with Elton John, George Michael, Take That, and Rod Stewart among the acts who have performed at the ground.

== Stands ==
| Stand name | For | Capacity |
|---|---|---|
| Beacon Electrical Mayflower Grandstand | Home Fans | 5,403 (seated - includes the Family Zone) |
| Babcock International Devonport End | Home Fans | 2,832 (seated) |
| Portcullis Legals Lyndhurst Road Stand | Home Fans | 7,072 (seated - includes the Zoo Corner) |
| Kawasaki Barn Park End | Home & Away Fans | 2,907 (seated) |

The Mayflower stand, known as the Grandstand, reopened fully on 1 January 2020 following a significant refurbishment. The other three stands are each very similar in design and are linked together at the corners, having been built in 2001.

The Devonport End houses the more vocal of the club's supporters. The Lyndhurst Stand is the largest of the three stands, holding about 7,000 spectators, including the corners. The corner towards the West side of the ground is the dedicated family corner, while the East side is known as the Zoo Corner. The Barn Park End is where the away supporters are housed. It holds about 3,000 spectators. The standard allocation given to visiting clubs had previously been 1,300, and this is increased as and when demand requires it.

All three stands have good views and standard facilities for a football stadium, including concourses, merchandise stands and food and drink outlets. The pitch measures about 100 metres (109 yards) long by 66 metres (72 yards) wide, with a few metres of run-off space on each side. The ground also has two pitch covers, rain and frost, to protect the pitch against adverse winter weather.

== History ==
=== Construction and early years ===
Home Park was originally used by the now defunct Devonport Albion rugby team from 1893 to 1894. Following a dispute with the ground's owners over rent, Albion left and the newly formed Plymouth Rugby moved in, eventually also leaving, in 1899. In 1901 the Argyle Athletic Club obtained a lease on the ground, then an oval-shaped bowl and cinder track surrounded by allotments and farmland. The new owners staged their first event, an athletics meeting, on Whit Monday in 1901, however, leaseholder Clarence Spooner was keen for it to stage football. Following a series of successful trial matches involving Argyle Football Club, which attracted healthy crowds, Spooner made the decision to focus on establishing the first professional football club in Devon. The club, formed in 1886, changed its name to Plymouth Argyle in 1903 and became professional that same year. Home Park played host to its first competitive match, against Northampton Town, on 5 September 1903 in front of a crowd of 4,438. At the time the ground had one wooden grandstand which could accommodate 2,000 people, while the other three sides of the ground were surrounded by slag heap banking with a waist-high fence. When Argyle joined the Football League in 1920 several improvements were required to meet safety requirements.

The wooden grandstand was demolished and replaced by a much larger and more modern structure at a cost of £12,000, while concrete terracing with crush barriers were added around the other three sides of the ground. A pitched roof was erected along the main entrance at the Devonport End of the ground, to provide cover for supporters using that terrace. The new grandstand incorporated players changing rooms and club offices. Many of these facilities were built with funds provided by the official supporters club. By the 1930s the ground was regularly hosting crowds in excess of 20,000 and on 10 October 1936 the record attendance was set. A crowd of 43,596 were in attendance to watch the club play out a 2–2 draw with Aston Villa in the Football League Second Division. The ground continued to host Second Division football until the outbreak of war in 1939.

=== Wartime bombing ===
The city of Plymouth was hit hard during the Second World War due to its strength as a military base: HMNB Devonport was the largest naval base in Western Europe. As the ground was so close to the city centre and Plymouth Sound, it was unlikely that it would escape unharmed. The Football League was abandoned three games into the 1939–40 season, but Home Park continued to host matches until summer 1940 in the hastily organised South West Regional League. In April 1941 there was a series of Luftwaffe bombing raids on the city, known as the Plymouth Blitz; Home Park did not escape. The Grandstand was all but destroyed after sustaining multiple hits and the pitch was littered with impact craters, which left the club facing a major rebuilding operation when the war ended in 1945.

=== Post-War ===
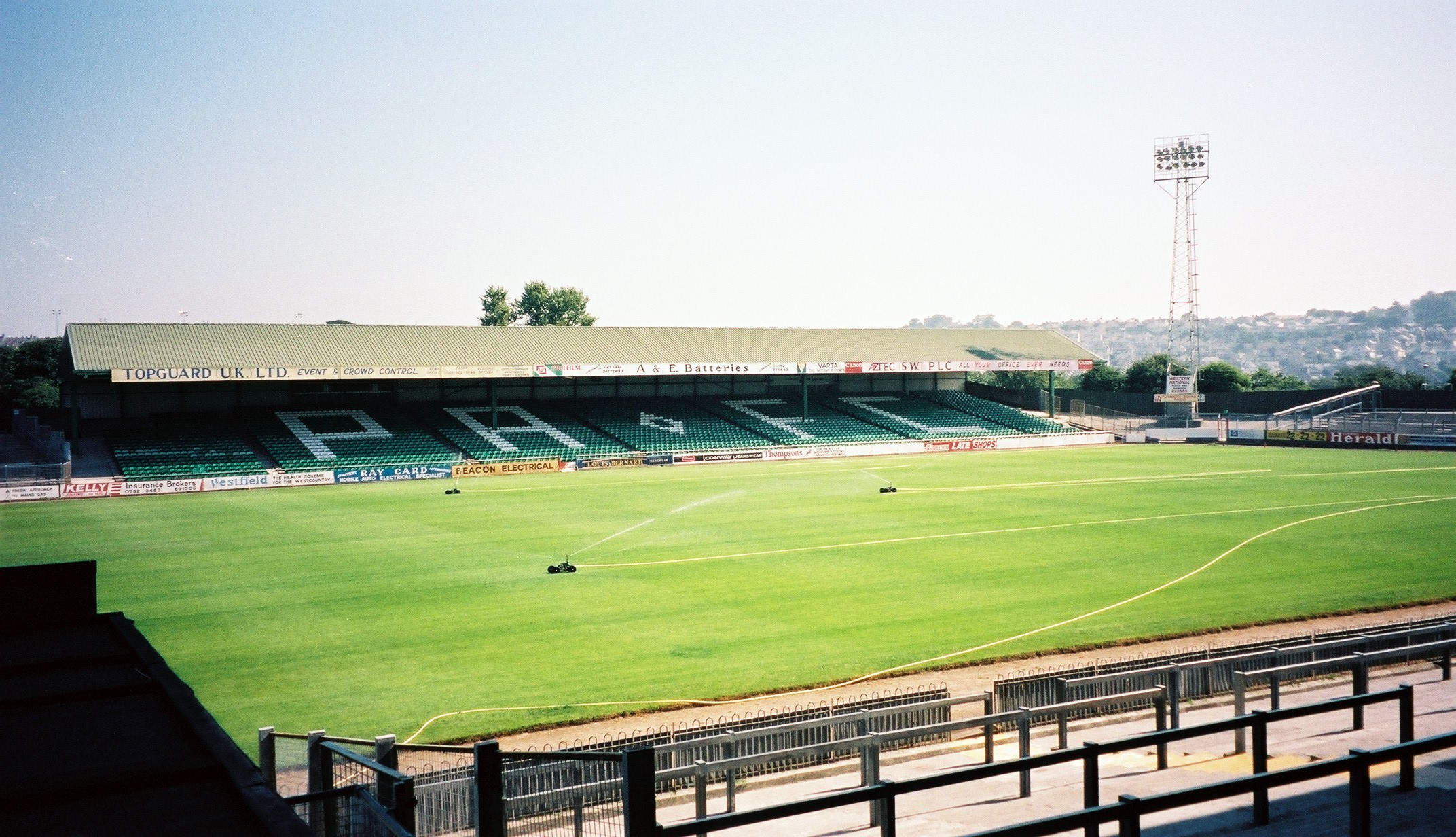
Home Park in 1996.

Several drastic measures were required to be ready for the resumption of a regionalised Football League in 1945. Disused army huts were used as changing rooms, buses and trams were used as offices, and railway sleepers were used for terracing. The Football League was still split into North and South divisions, having been created four years earlier in order for the League to continue whilst limiting the amount of travel by teams during the war. The 1945–46 season was its only full campaign. Records from this time tend not to be included in official records. Plymouth Argyle's first official match back at the ground for six years was played on 31 August 1946. 25,659 spectators watched a 3–1 victory against West Ham United in the Second Division.

A new double-decker Grandstand was built in 1952, one of the last to be based on the template made popular during the 1920s and 30s by prolific football stadium architect Archibald Leitch, with floodlights installed in October 1953. Running the length of the pitch, it had standing room in the first tier, known as the Mayflower Terrace, and wooden seating in the second tier. When a roof was erected on the Lyndhurst side of the ground in 1964, three-quarters of the ground were under cover, with all but the second tier of the Grandstand being standing room. In the 1969–70 season seats were added at the back of the Mayflower Terrace, which took the seating capacity to 4,100 and the overall capacity to 40,000. In the late 1970s the pitched roof at the Devonport End of the ground had to be removed for safety reasons. It was replaced in 1984 by a non-pitched structure, leaving just the Barn Park End uncovered.

The ground remained relatively unchanged throughout the 1990s, aside from the Lyndhurst Stand being made all-seater. However, its future seemed unclear when the club outlined plans to move to a new site in Central Park in 1996. The Plymouth Tradium, designed by Alfred McAlpine, would have seated 25,000, and also incorporated community sports and leisure facilities. These plans were soon shelved in favour of revamping Home Park.

=== Redevelopment (2001–02) ===
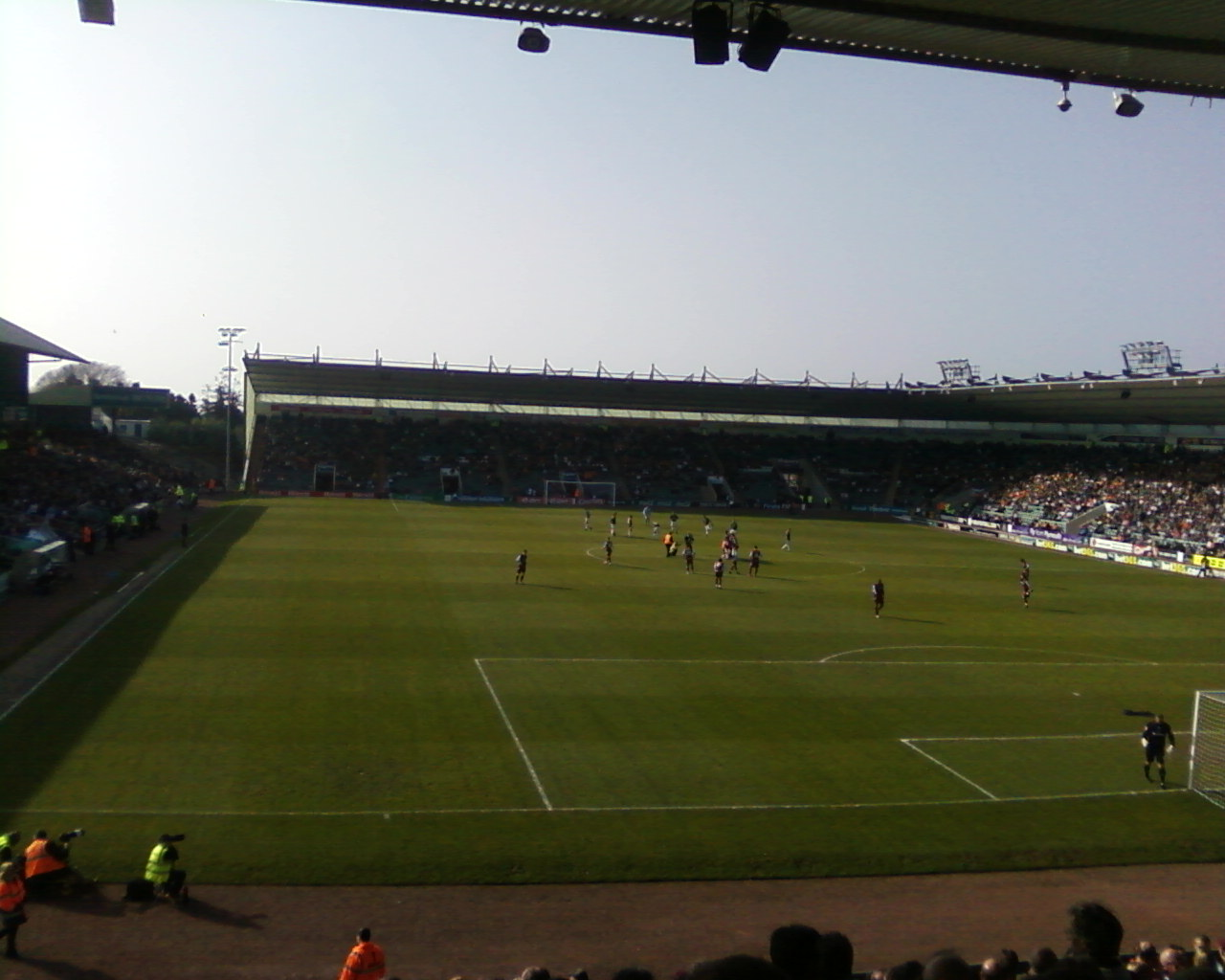
Devonport End in 2009.

A new plan, based on wholesale redevelopment of the existing ground, was announced in 2000 which at the time would cost an estimated £9million. The stadium would be rebuilt in two phases, with the first phase seeing the complete redevelopment of the Devonport End, Lyndhurst Stand, and Barn Park End. The second phase involved the Mayflower Grandstand which would be replaced by a new three-tiered structure to complete an 18,500 capacity all-seater bowl. The green light came in June 2001 when the club and Plymouth City Council agreed a new long-term lease for the ground. The building firm Barr Construction moved onto the site two months later.

During the first six months of the 2001–2002 season supporters watched the club's matches from one touchline before the first phase was completed in February 2002. One of the biggest attendances since the redevelopment was set on 20 April 2002, as 18,517 spectators watched Plymouth Argyle recorded a 2–0 win against Cheltenham Town in the Division Three, shortly after securing promotion as champions of that division. A feat which was bettered in 2004, and then in 2007. Home Park attracted its highest average league attendance since the early 1960s in 2004–05 season in the Championship, the first season after it was rebranded from its former name of Division One. Despite this, a start date for the second phase of redevelopment would not materialise. The former chairman of Plymouth Argyle, Paul Stapleton, declared that not completing the project was the biggest disappointment of his tenure.

=== Freehold purchase and conversion to all seater ===
The club purchased the freehold of the ground from Plymouth City Council to become sole owners in December 2006 for £2.7m. It was hoped that work on a new Grandstand would begin the following year. It hosted its biggest crowd since the redevelopment in March 2007 when 20,652 were in attendance to watch Argyle play Watford in the quarter-finals of the FA Cup. That summer the ground became all-seated as the club was forced to convert the Mayflower Terrace into seating by the Department for Culture, Media and Sport. In the aftermath of the Hillsborough disaster in 1989 regulations were brought in, recommended by the Taylor report, that all stadiums in the top two divisions of English football must be all-seated unless there are exceptional circumstances. The club had been given three years grace after winning promotion back to the Football League Championship in 2004.

Three major summer initiatives were announced by the club just over a week later, which were carried out over the next month. The Mayflower Terrace was replaced by temporary, unreserved seating with a capacity of 3,500. A new state-of-the-art public address system was installed, and the last of ground's iconic floodlight towers were dismantled after 54 years of service, with a new system put in its place. The capacity of the ground was therefore reduced by roughly two thousand to 19,500 following these changes.

=== Unsuccessful World Cup bid ===
In August 2009, Plymouth Argyle announced plans for wholesale development of the stadium and regeneration throughout the area. The club declared that the city of Plymouth would be submitting an application to the FA to be a host venue for England's 2018 FIFA World Cup Bid.

The plans, designed by Populous, included developing the stadium into a 46,000 capacity all-seater arena, with a 5,000-seat indoor facility and hotel built into the complex, at a cost of at least £50m. The build would be done in three stages. The First Phase, a new Mayflower Stand, would have become a reality regardless of the bid, increasing the capacity to 27,000. The Second Phase, an additional 8,000 seats, and the Third Phase, an additional 11,000 seats, would be completed by the 2014–15 season should Plymouth's application and England's bid be successful, giving the stadium a capacity of 46,000 all-seated by this stage.

The city presented its bid at Wembley Stadium in November 2009 with numerous businesses and sports clubs from Devon and Cornwall fully behind it. A selection of those included the city's rugby union and basketball clubs, Plymouth Albion, and Plymouth Raiders, and local football clubs Exeter City, and Torquay United.

Plymouth was selected as a part of England's 2018 FIFA World Cup Bid, alongside 11 other cities on 16 December 2009. However, on 2 December 2010, England lost its World Cup bid to Russia. Following the failure of the World Cup bid, the consortium that had taken controlling interest in the club in 2009 quickly lost interest now property speculation was out of the question and a few months later the club entered administration.

=== Changes of ownership (2010s) ===
On 4 March 2011, the club entered administration. As part of a rescue package, which saw South West hotelier James Brent take over the club, Plymouth City Council agreed to buy back the freehold for a reported £1.6m and lease the ground back to the club for an annual rent of £135,000.

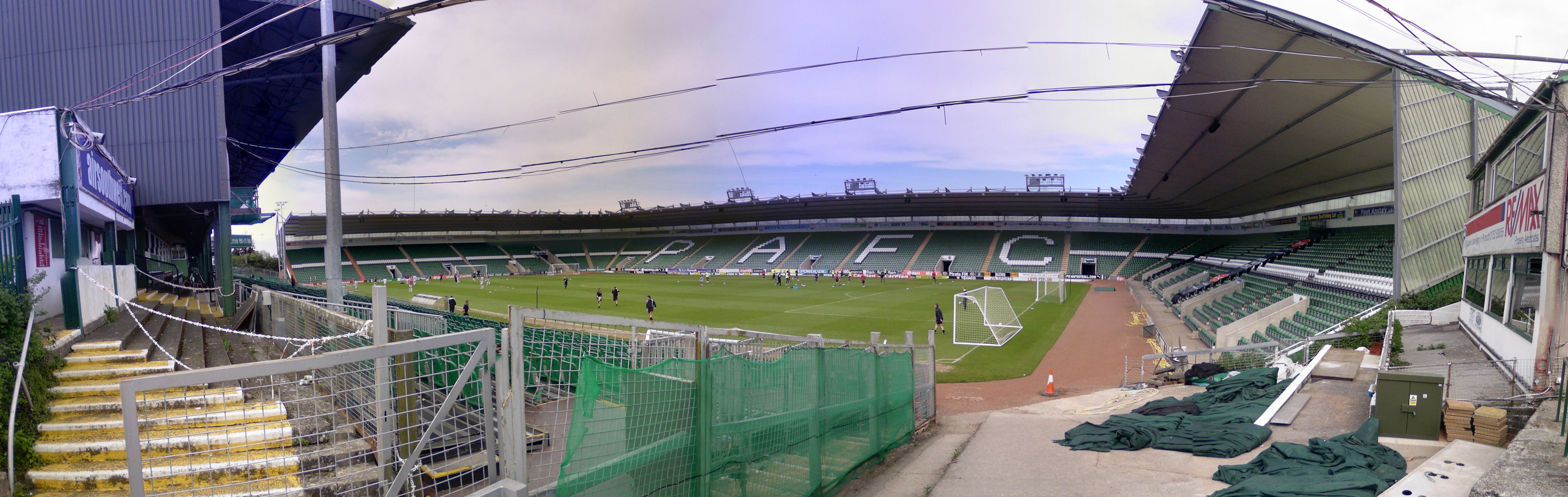
Inside Home Park from corner of Mayflower and Barn Park. Before reserve match in the Football Combination between Plymouth Argyle and Swansea City in 2009

With new investment and directors on the Argyle board, the club could afford to buy-back the ground from the Council in 2016.

In January 2017, over 2,200 temporary seats were re-fitted to the Mayflower Terrace, ahead of Argyle's FA Cup tie against Liverpool. The attendance for the game was 17,048.

=== Redevelopment (2019) ===
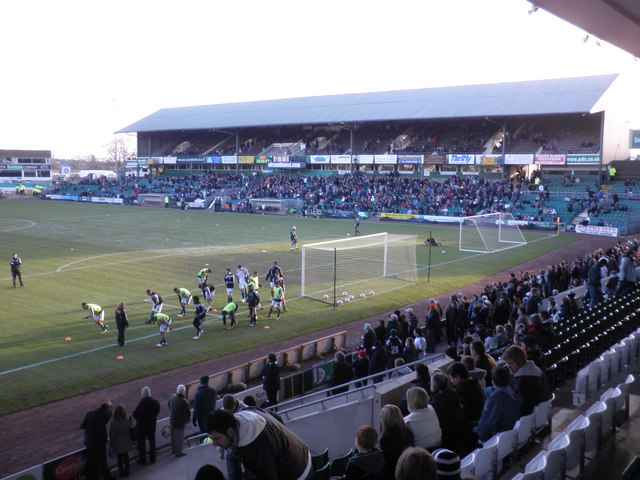
Redevelopment of the Grandstand began in 2018.

The Mayflower Grandstand had been the club's main stand, with space for about 7,000 spectators including the old terrace. It was the oldest part of the ground, having been built in 1952 by the Leitch Company - in what was their final commission before winding up. Prior to redevelopment the stand housed the club's main offices, boardroom, team changing rooms, press rooms, TV gantry, and also accommodated executive boxes. The player tunnel sat slightly off centre going underneath the standing terrace, leading up towards the changing rooms.

Since the turn of the century, there had been multiple plans to replace this stand, including in 2001 as a 'Phase 2' to the horseshoe redevelopment, in 2010 as part of the 2018 World Cup bid, and in 2013, when then-chairman James Brent had planning permission approved for the demolition and rebuilding of the Mayflower Grandstand, however these plans never proceeded due to financial restraints.

In 2018, a new set of plans received consent and the redevelopment of the Grandstand and the surrounding area began. The main redevelopment would include the fitting of new seats in the top tier, replacing the antiquated wooden ones, fitting new seats on the terrace, and replacing the roof. For players, there would be a new changing room block and a new tunnel to the East side of the ground in the corner of the Grandstand and the Barn Park End. Works were carried out by GL events, and the Grandstand was subsequently shut for renovations to spectators for the entirety of the 2018–19 season, severely reducing Home Park's capacity. The disabled enclosure to the west, and the Chisholm Lounge, as well as many temporary buildings used as club offices, a club shop, and as a fan bar, to the east, were also demolished.

The 1930s turnstile façade to the west of the Grandstand was given a new look in October 2019 by Marcus Rees, a graphic design student at the Plymouth College of Art, and local business, Eagle Signs. The façade became the entrance to the new club shop and ticket office.

The redeveloped Grandstand was opened partially in stages, across several test events, before being officially opened on 1 January 2020, for Argyle's EFL League Two match against Swindon Town.

=== Ground improvements (2020s) ===
On 11 August 2021, it was revealed that ticket sales in the upper tier of redeveloped Grandstand would be limited, due to inadaquate comfort and experience, both in the seats and in the concourse. Works rectifying these issues have been put on hold until Summer 2023.

In 2022, the seats in the Lyndhurst Stand were replaced, with the initials "PAFC" replaced by "Home Park" in the seat pattern. In August, a scoreboard screen was fitted in the Zoo Corner, and in October, a statue to Jack Leslie was erected outside the Devonport End. Around the stadium, hostile vehicle barriers were installed around the club shop and ticket office, new signage was erected, and the staff car park was resurfaced.

== Other uses ==
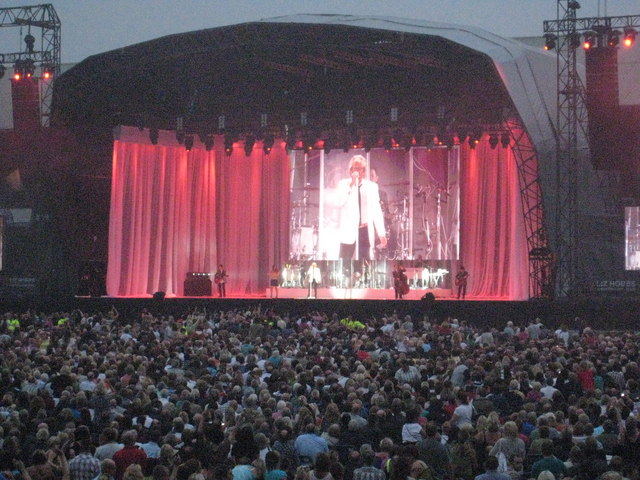
Rod Stewart performing at Home Park in 2009, his only UK tour date that year.

The stadium has also hosted matches involving the England national team at various levels. The England Amateur team played 4 matches against other national teams, twice against their Welsh counterparts in 1914 winning 9–1 and 1925 winning 2–1, Italy in 1972 winning 4–0, and Finland in 1973, again winning, this time 3–0. The Amateurs also played a match against Plymouth Argyle, on 1972-11-13, winning 2–1 with an attendance of 830. A FA Amateur XI beat a South Western Football League XI 7–3 in 1954. Home Park also hosted three England Under-23 matches in the 1960s and 1970s. A 6–1 win against Belgium in 1962, a 4–1 win against Bulgaria in 1970 and a 0–0 draw with Poland in 1973. Home Park also hosted the England under-21 team in a European Qualifying against Poland in June 1989. England won 2-1 in front of a crowd of 10,000. . In March 2015, more than 11,000 people watched the England U-20s play out a 2-1 friendly win over the USA U-20s.

The final of the 1933–34 Football League Third Division South Cup was held at Home Park, Exeter City beating Torquay United 1–0.

The ground hosted a match in 1966 between representative sides of the Football League and the Irish Football League. A crowd of 35,458 were in attendance as the Football League, featuring seven members of the 1966 FIFA World Cup winning squad, were 12–0 victors.

On 5 October 1977, Home Park hosted Manchester United's European Cup Winners' Cup first round second leg tie against AS Saint-Etienne of France. United won the game 2–0 (3–1 on aggregate). Despite being based nearly 300 miles away at Old Trafford in Manchester, United had played their "home" tie at Home Park as UEFA had ordered them to play at least 120 miles from Old Trafford due to hooliganism incidents at the first leg in France, for which they had initially been expelled from the competition completely and only readmitted on appeal.

Home Park has also been used for purposes other than football. Before Argyle moved in, the site was used for rugby union matches, and it hosted an athletics meeting in the early 20th century. Rugby returned in 1951 when South Africa played the South West Counties, winning 17–8.

Plymouth Argyle was limited in what it could do with the stadium throughout the 1900s, because of a long-standing lease agreement with the City Council. That changed in 2006 when the club purchased the freehold of the ground for £2.7m. Soon after, the club announced it would begin hosting live music in the summer months, starting in 2007, and the first act to perform there was Elton John. Other major acts have followed, including George Michael, Meat Loaf, Westlife, and Rod Stewart. The stadium also hosts an annual free-admittance carol service in December to celebrate Christmas, in association with the Plymouth branch of Christian organisation Faith and Football. Westlife were scheduled to perform again in the stadium on 4 July 2020 for their "Stadiums in the Summer Tour", but this was cancelled because of the COVID-19 pandemic.

In July 2018, with help from Plymouth City Council, the ground was used to screen England's World Cup semi-final defeat to Croatia at no charge for spectators.

During the COVID-19 pandemic, areas of the Mayflower Grandstand, as well as the players' changing rooms, were handed over to the University Hospitals Plymouth NHS Trust to hold routine antenatal and phlebotomy services, in an attempt to relieve strain on Derriford Hospital and local GP surgeries. Club CEO Andrew Parkinson said: "With staff currently working from home and no football in the immediate future, offering up Home Park for the use of the NHS is, we feel, our civic duty."

On 27 May 2023, Muse played the first show of the European Will of the People World Tour. This was Muse's first performance in Plymouth since 2001.

On 4 June 2024, Take That played the stadium for the first time as part of This Life on Tour.

== Records ==
The highest attendance recorded at Home Park is 43,596 for a Football League Second Division match between Plymouth Argyle and Aston Villa on 10 October 1936. Home Park's record attendance as an all-seater stadium currently stands at 17,511, set at a Football League Championship match between Plymouth Argyle and Watford on 22 March 2008. The lowest recorded attendance for a competitive match at Home Park was 944, set on 10 December 1996, for a Football League Trophy first round tie between Plymouth Argyle and AFC Bournemouth.

Home Park's record attendance for a non-competitive match is 37,639, for a mid-season friendly between Plymouth Argyle and Santos on 14 March 1973.

The highest average attendance at Home Park over a League season is 23,290, set in the 1946–47 season. The lowest average attendance at Home Park came in the 1982–83 season, when an average of 4,537 spectators watched each match.

== Transport ==
The stadium is on Outland Road, which links to the A38 dual-carriageway with direct access to Cornwall and the north of England. On foot the stadium is approximately 1 mile (1.6 km) from Plymouth railway station (walking through Central Park), and 1.8 miles (2.8 km) from the city centre.

== See also ==
- List of stadiums in the United Kingdom by capacity
- Lists of stadiums
