= West Cornwall Hospital =

- Royal Cornwall Hospitals NHS Trust
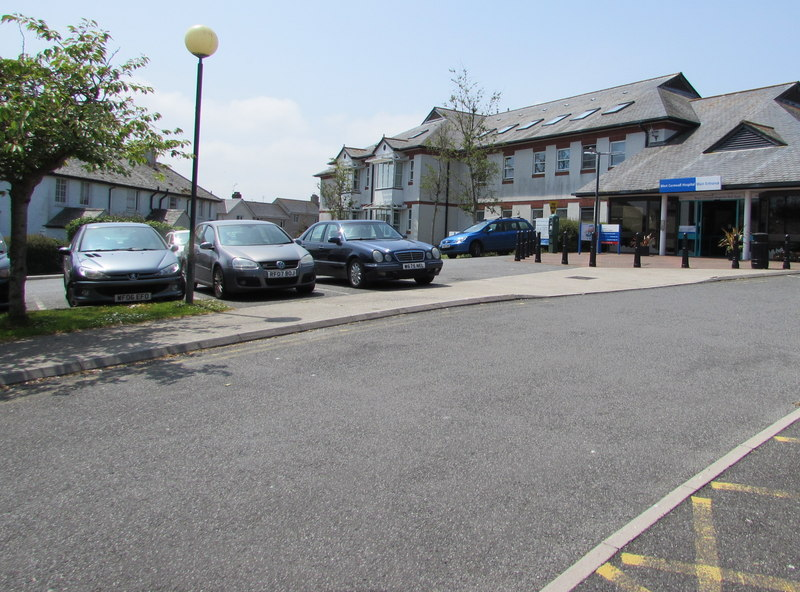
- West Cornwall Hospital

- Shown in Cornwall

Geography
- Location: Penzance, Cornwall, England
- Coordinates: 50.122°N 5.540°W

Organisation
- Care system: National Health Service

Services
- Emergency department: No
- Beds: 80

Links
- Website: royalcornwallhospitals.nhs.uk/our-hospitals/west-cornwall-hospital-penzance/

West Cornwall Hospital is a hospital located in Penzance, Cornwall, England. It is managed by the Royal Cornwall Hospitals NHS Trust.

== History ==
The hospital has its origins in the Penzance Dispensary established in 1809. This became the West Cornwall Dispensary and Infirmary in 1873 and the West Cornwall Hospital in 1928. It joined the National Health Service in 1948. A new CT scanner and new X-ray equipment were installed at the hospital in spring 2018.

== Services ==
The hospital has an urgent care centre, two medical wards and a day case surgery.

== See also ==
- Healthcare in Cornwall
- List of hospitals in England
