= Royal Cornwall Infirmary =

- Royal Cornwall Hospitals NHS Trust
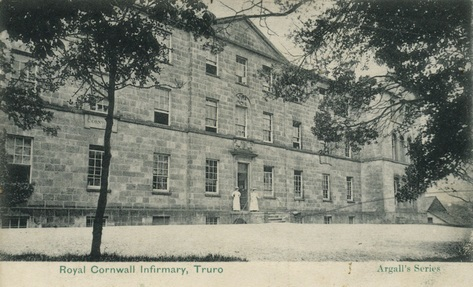
- Royal Cornwall Infirmary

- Shown in Cornwall

Geography
- Location: Truro, Cornwall, England, United Kingdom
- Coordinates: 50.2562°N 5.0549°W

Organisation
- Care system: Public NHS
- Type: Teaching

History
- Founded: 1799
- Closed: 1999

Links
- Lists: Hospitals in England

Royal Cornwall Infirmary was a hospital in the south of the centre of Truro, Cornwall, England.

== History ==
The Royal Cornwall Infirmary was designed by William Wood, and paid for by public subscription. It had just 20 beds when it opened on 12 August 1799. It was the first of its kind in Cornwall and was designed to service the mining community.

During the First World War it provided 50 beds to the War Office for serious medical cases from the Duke of Cornwall's Light Infantry. After expanding to provide 180 beds in 1939, it was badly damaged by 500 kg bombs and by machine gun fire on 6 August 1942 during the Second World War. It joined the National Health Service in 1947.

Services were transferred from the Infirmary to the Royal Cornwall Hospital at Treliske in the mid-1990s. The infirmary closed down in 1999, and has since been redeveloped with housing.
