= Roger Michell (studio potter) =

English potter (1947–2018)

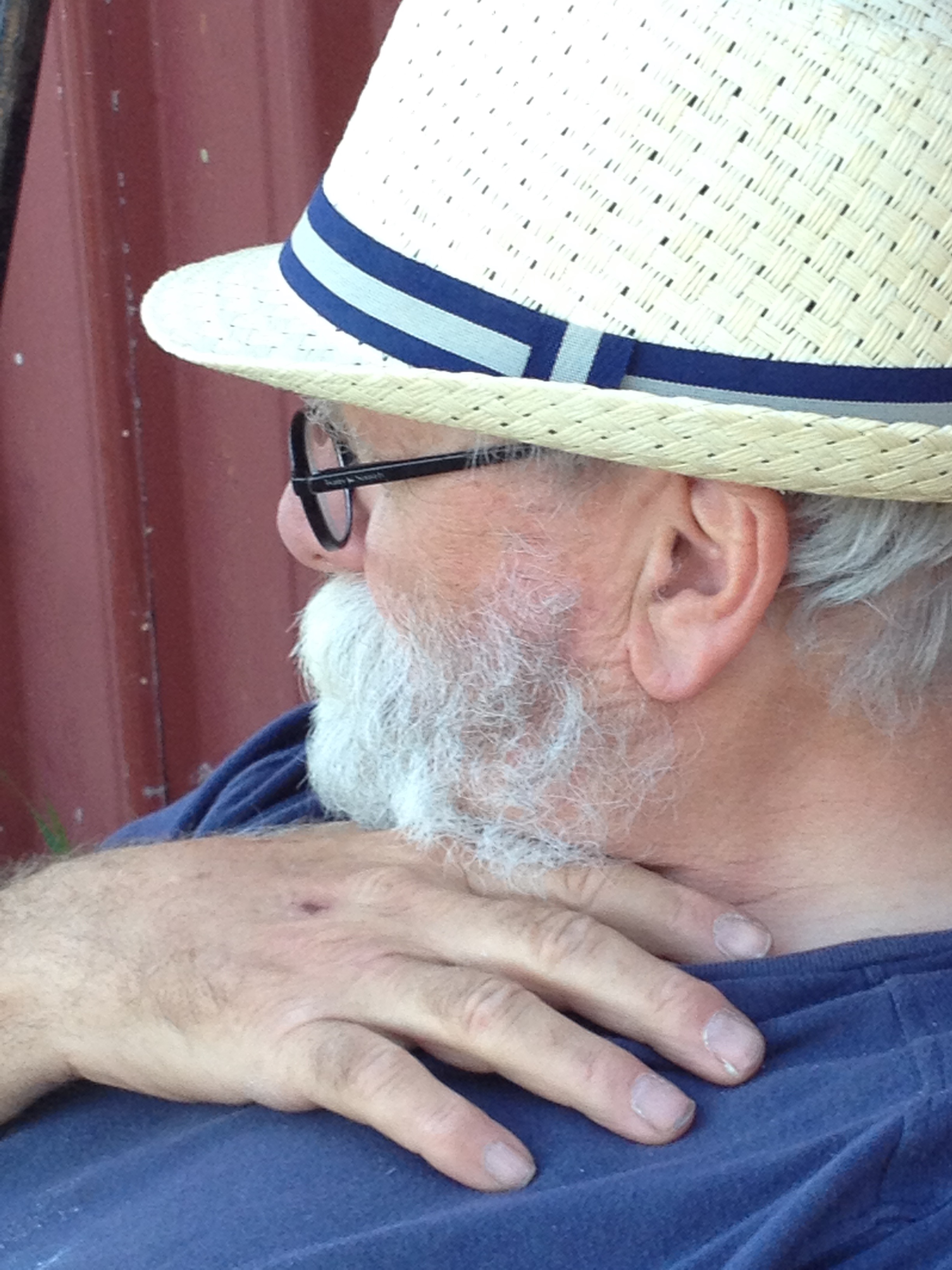
- Michell in 2015
- Born: Roger Scott Michell; 1947; Guildford, Surrey, England
- Died: 11 April 2018 (aged 70–71); Algarve
- Occupations: Artist, illustrator, poet, potter, writer
- Spouses: Danka Napiorkowska (m. 1970–1988) Jill Murphy (m. 1988–1990) Julia Michell (m. 2002)
- Children: 3

Roger Michell (1947 – 2018) was a British studio potter, artist, illustrator, poet and writer. He was most known for designing Walking Ware, a tea set on legs with over-sized Mary Jane shoes. During the nineteen seventies and eighties, thousands of these tea sets were sold, either hand made from Lustre Pottery studio or manufactured by Carltonware in Stoke-on-Trent.

== Life ==
=== Early career ===
Michell was born in Guildford, Surrey, the youngest son of Edna Wilkinson née Scott, a school teacher, and Howard Norman Tobias Michell, referred to as Norman, a modernist architect and garden designer. He attended Harrow High School until he was 15 when he was apprenticed to David Eeles in Dorset. He stayed with them as part of the family. Here Michell developed his throwing skills and observed first hand the building of a brick kiln.

He was accepted into a foundation course at the Central School of Art and Design in 1963 at the age of 16. He studied his degree under Gilbert Harding-Greene but left the degree a year early in 1965, to set up his own pottery in London making tableware. Anthony Caro was Michell's landlord in St John's Wood and his massive studio was behind the pottery, so when Michell's business folded in 1966, Caro offered him a job. He spent the next year painting Caro's sculptures which were 3D representations of paintings or music. A year later he went to the Serpentine Gallery as a gallery assistant.

=== Lustre pottery and the Walking Ware tea set ===
In 1970, Michell met and subsequently married Danka Napiorkowska, a fellow student. They moved to Yorkshire to establish a pottery in East Knapton. The work produced reflected a shared admiration of 18th century creamware and some ambitious designs were produced influencing the look and feel of 1970s pottery. A plethora of novel designs began to gain prominence in the high street, for example a liquorice allsorts handbag and novelty teapots.

Lustre Pottery was officially established 12 April 1972. Michell threw, turned and cast one-off pots which were often glazed and decorated by Napiorkowska. The first Walking Tea Set was designed in 1973, popularly known as Walking Ware. The designed were also mass-produced by Carltonware. Carltonware closed in 1986.

Michell moved to Cornwall with his family, where he set up a one-man studio while his wife concentrated on her painting. They divorced in 1988. His second marriage, to children's author Jill Murphy, also ended in divorce.

=== Commissions and lecturing ===
Michell sold the family home and moved into his studio. He produce decorative, thrown and turned earthenware items for local and London galleries where he also exhibited. He developed a line of cast tableware, instantly recognisable by their strong, classical shapes and rich cobalt blue glaze although copper and manganese were also used. They were decorated in wax relief and enamel, with humorous designs such as snorkelling dogs and swimming penguins. They were a popular tourist line however Roger also experimented with one-off items such as bowls, teapots and cups. He also worked on private commissions in the manner of 18th century potteries alone or with an assistant. Among these were 3 porcelain dinner services consisting of over 100 pieces each and decorated using a particular theme – a Greek mythological dinner service, an insect theme and an astrological service. Roger made teapots, both serious and novelty, for collectors and private clients. In 1989, strapped for cash with a young family to raise, he began to lecture part-time for Falmouth University on the BA Hons Ceramics degree.

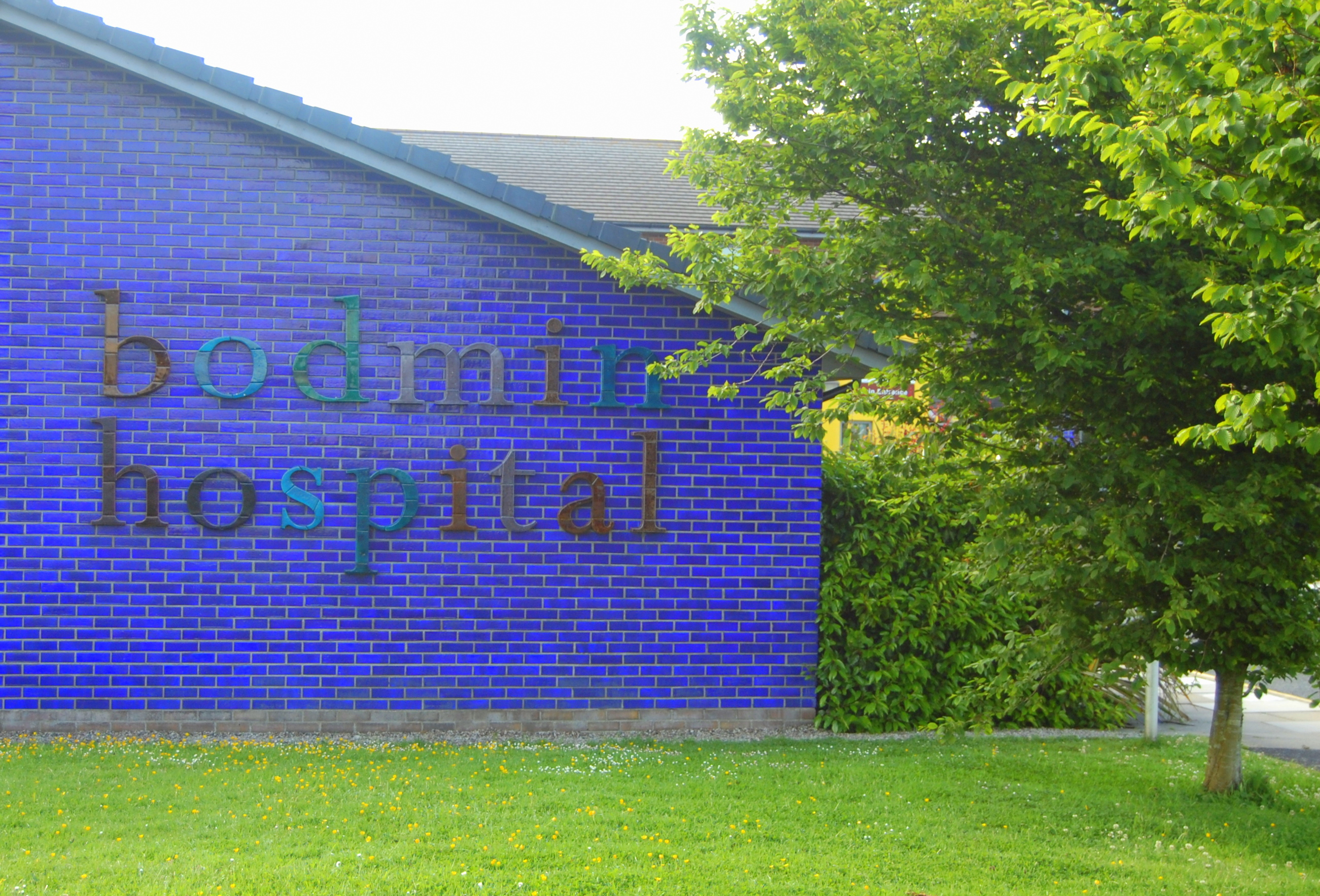
Bodmin hospital with brickwork and lettering by Michell

In 2001, Michell was commissioned by Cornwall Partnership NHS Foundation Trust to become Artist in Residence for a new Bodmin Hospital, He commissioned various local artists, including his former wife Napiorkowska, and designed and made the blue glazed brick wall bearing the hospital's name. In 2001, Michell decorated a hydrotherapy pool at Bristol Royal Hospital for Children, with poet Mike Hughes. Michell illustrated Hughes' poetry on white, manufactured tiles. These formed a tiled mural which depicted various Bristolian scenes, among others, such as Isambard Kingdom Brunel. Michell went on to commission art for 2 more hospitals.

Michell married Julia on 24 December 2002, and they moved to France in 2003. In France he was able to spend more time developing his ideas and revisiting old ones such as the fashion models he and Sally Tuffin had collaborated on in 1985. He installed a gas kiln. In 2005, he design 2 more limited edition Walking Ware teasets using porcelain rather than earthenware. Here he found time to develop his personal work whilst also making teapots for collectors.

=== Last years and exhibiting works ===
Michell held his last exhibition of pots and paintings in England in 2013. Paintings in oil included several series, one of the French countryside surrounding the studio where he lived and worked, another a series of studies concerning the alteration of colour according to the light conditions, painted whilst staying on Le Point de Raz, the most Westerly point in Brittany. A year before he died he finished a long series of oil paintings of his wife Julia.

Julia and her pets, oil on canvas, 2016

He wrote and published a mystery novel, The Salt Glaze Murders and he cut hazel from the French hedgerows to make a series of greenwood chairs.

From 2014, due to the persistence of a respiratory illness, he began to spend the winters in the Algarve in Portugal with his wife, Julia and her 4 dogs. Here he built a brick kiln to fire a series of large clay sculptures that he had begun in France. He also spent time experimenting with oils and writing his second book which is unfinished.

His work is held in museum collections including the V&A, Glasgow City Museum, the Norwich Castle Museum, the Potteries Museum & Art Gallery in Staffordshire, and the Bramah Tea and Coffee Museum in London.

He died unexpectedly on the night of 11 April 2018, after a short illness.
