= St Michael's Hospital, Hayle =

St Michael's Hospital
- Royal Cornwall Hospitals NHS Trust
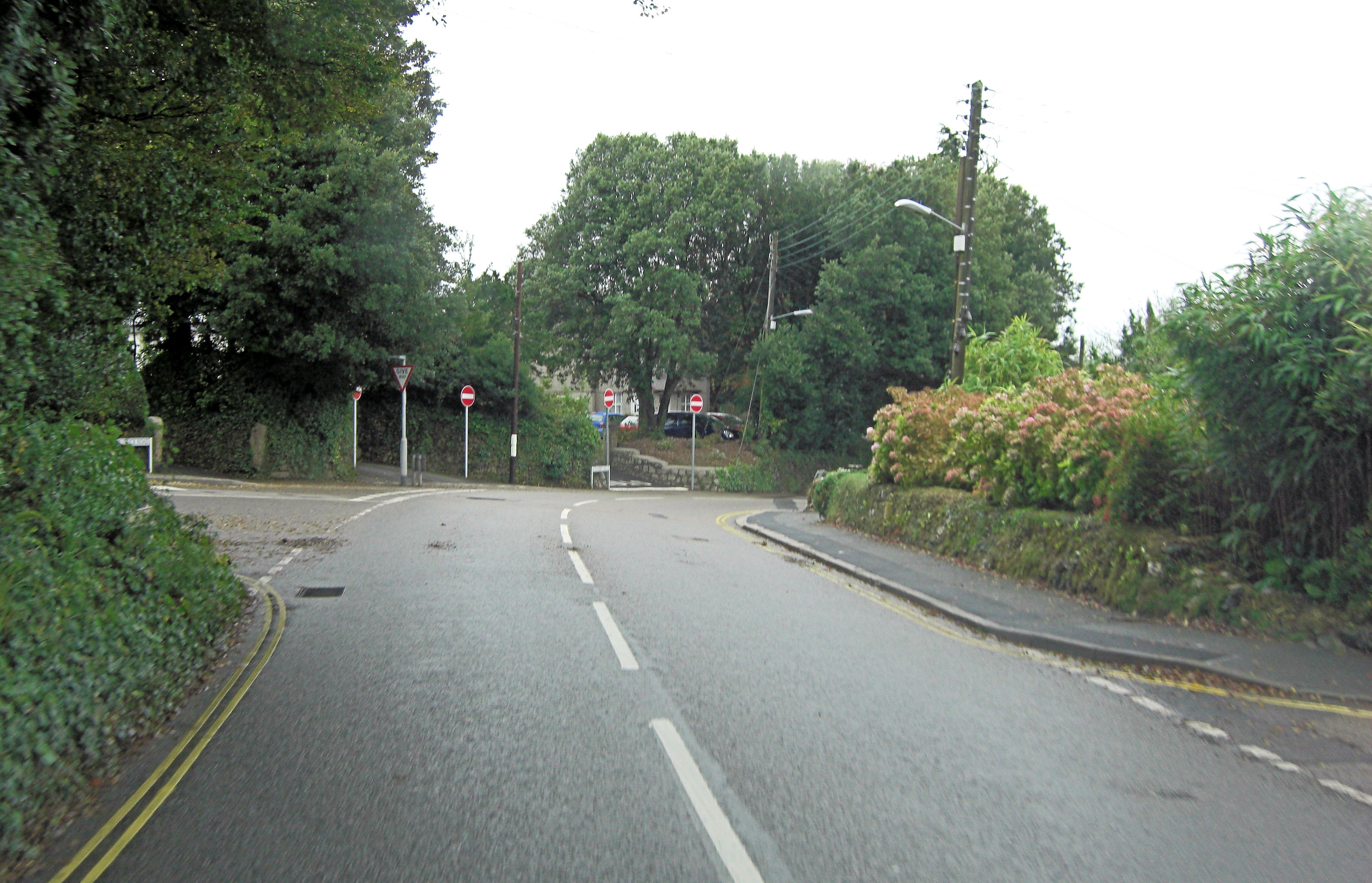
- St Michael's Hospital and The Downes Residential Care Home (in the trees ahead)

- Shown in Cornwall

Geography
- Location: Hayle, Cornwall, England, United Kingdom
- Coordinates: 50.180°N 5.424°W

Organisation
- Care system: Public NHS
- Type: Surgical
- Affiliated university: None

Services
- Emergency department: No Accident & Emergency
- Beds: 28

History
- Founded: 1913

Links
- Website: royalcornwallhospitals.nhs.uk/our-hospitals/st-michaels-hospital-hayle/
- Lists: Hospitals in England

St Michael's Hospital is a small hospital located in Hayle, Cornwall, England run by Royal Cornwall Hospitals NHS Trust.

== History ==
Following the donation by Miss Frances Ellis of some property in Hayle to the Congregation of the Daughters of the Cross of Liege in 1904, the Daughters of the Cross established a convent in The Downes, Miss Ellis's former manor house, and a hospital on an adjacent part of the site in 1913.

After the Daughters of the Cross experienced some financial difficulties paying for the running of the hospital, the Royal Cornwall Hospitals NHS Trust acquired the hospital in November 2003. The convent became The Downes Residential Care Home at the same time.

== Services ==
The hospital carries out approximately 5,000 operations each year and sees more than 17,000 outpatients each year. Its specialisms are breast surgery and orthopaedic surgery.

== See also ==
- Healthcare in Cornwall
- List of hospitals in England
