= Jill Murphy =

British author and illustrator (1949–2021)

- Born: Jill Frances Murphy; 5 July 1949; Merton Park, Surrey, England
- Died: 18 August 2021 (aged 72); Treliske, Cornwall, England
- Education: Chelsea Art School; Croydon School of Art
- Occupations: Author, illustrator
- Spouse(s): Peter Wilks (m. 1971; div. 1979) Roger Michell (m. 1988; div. 1994)
- Children: 1
- Writing career
- Years active: 1970–2021
- Notable works: The Worst Witch series The Large Family series
- Notable awards: Kate Greenaway Medal; Smarties Prize

Jill Frances Murphy (5 July 1949 – 18 August 2021) was a British author and illustrator of children's books. First published by Allison & Busby in 1974, she was best known for the Worst Witch novels and Large Family picture books, with sales amounting to several millions. Murphy's books were adapted for stage and television. She was called "one of the most engaging writers and illustrators for children in the land".

== Biography ==
=== Early life ===
Born in Merton Park, Surrey, the daughter of Reeney (Irene) and Eric Murphy, Jill Frances Murphy was brought up in Chessington, Surrey. Reminiscing about growing up in post-war Britain, she said: "I had a classic 1950s childhood. My mum was at home, because in those days that's what mums did. My dad worked in an aircraft factory. He was up really early in the morning, came home exhausted at night and I didn't really see him." She won a scholarship to the Roman Catholic grammar school in Wimbledon, London. She showed an interest in writing and drawing at the age of six; although not excelling in other school subjects, she had made her own enormous library of hand-written and illustrated books while still at primary school. She enjoyed reading boarding-school stories, which provided material and inspiration for Miss Cackle's Academy in the Worst Witch series, as did the Ursuline High School that she had attended in Wimbledon. She grew up as a Roman Catholic, but she did not practise the faith in later years. Her stay-at-home mother was a "book maniac" and her father was an Irish engineer.

=== The Worst Witch ===
Murphy started to write The Worst Witch – "the magical tale of an accident-prone girl attempting to navigate the magical codes and murky corridors of Miss Cackle's Academy for Witches" – while still at school (Murphy admitted to having herself been the model for her protagonist Mildred Hubble), but put the book on hold while she attended Chelsea and Croydon Art Schools. She continued to write it during a year living in a village in Togo, West Africa, and later while working as a nanny back in the UK. After receiving rejection letters from publishers to whom she offered the book (as she recalls, "They said children would be frightened about a school for witches..."), in 1970 when she was 21 she decided to try the new young company Allison & Busby (founded by Clive Allison and Margaret Busby), as the result of a series of coincidences involving Murphy having spent time in Ghana, and a friend meeting Ghanaian Margaret Busby at a party in London. Murphy said she was "thrilled to find the publishers were quirky like me", as she further revealed in an interview with The Telegraph: "They accepted it immediately, and printed 5,000 copies, and I remember wondering how many aunts and uncles I had, and what we would do with the rest." The book proved an instant success with both critics and readers (Murphy recalled that she "immediately got a lot of fan letters and the whole thing took off like a rocket"), selling out within two months of publication in 1974. In 1977, Murphy provided illustrations for another Allison & Busby children's book, Fiona MacDonald's The Duke Who Had Too Many Giraffes and Other Stories, and she continued working as a nanny until Allison & Busby's publication in 1980 of The Worst Witch Strikes Again prompted her to devote herself to writing full-time.

The Worst Witch stories have become some of the most successful titles on the Young Puffin paperback list and had sold more than three million copies by 2008, and more than five million worldwide as of 2016. Several adaptations of The Worst Witch were made, starting in 1986 with a television film of the same title, premiering on ITV. It later aired on Disney Channel during the 1990s around the time of Halloween. Other adaptations include an ITV series, broadcast on CITV between 1998 and 2001 (followed by its two spin-offs in 2001 and 2005), and another in 2017 on CBBC.

A musical stage production called The Worst Witch Live, adapted by Emma Reeves from Murphy's original work, was shown at the Royal & Derngate Theatre in Northampton as a Christmas show in 2018, and toured the UK in 2019 across some 16 different venues, including at the Vaudeville Theatre in London's West End from 24 July to 8 September 2019. The show received an Olivier Award for best family show in 2020.

=== Picture books ===
Murphy was also known for picture books, especially the Large Family series, which detail the domestic chaos of an elephant family. First published in 1986, Five Minutes Peace has sold more than five million copies worldwide and has been translated into 19 languages. For the second book, All in One Piece (1987), she was a commended runner-up for the Greenaway Medal from the British Library Association, recognising the year's best children's book by a British subject (the second of her two commendations). (Note: Today there are usually eight books on the Greenaway Medal shortlist. According to CCSU, some runners-up were Commended (from 1959) or Highly Commended (from 1974). There were 99 distinctions of both kinds in 44 years including three for 1980 and three for 1987 (one highly commended).) The Large Family is now a television series on CBeebies and ABC Kids. In 1996, The Last Noo-Noo was adapted as a play and performed at the Polka Theatre, London.

Murphy also wrote Dear Hound (2009), about a deerhound who goes missing after a storm and the quest for his owners to find him.

== Personal life ==
Murphy was married and divorced twice, first to Peter Wilks from 1971 to 1979, then to potter Roger Michell from 1988 to 1994. Her son Charlie was born in 1990, from her second marriage. She lived in St Mabyn, Cornwall, and died at the Royal Cornwall Hospital from breast cancer on 18 August 2021, aged 72.

== Honours and recognition ==
In 2007, Murphy received an honorary fellowship from University College Falmouth.

== Book awards ==
Year	Book	Award	Achievement
1980	Peace at Last	Kate Greenaway Medal — the British Library Association annual award for children's book illustration	Commended
1986	Five Minutes' Peace	Children's Book Award	Shortlisted
1987	Five Minutes' Peace	Parents Magazine Best Books for Babies Award	Winner
1987	All in One Piece	Kate Greenaway Medal	Commended
1987	All in One Piece	Children's Book Award	Shortlisted
1994	A Quiet Night In	Kate Greenaway Medal	Shortlisted
1995	The Last Noo-Noo	Smarties Prize (ages 0–5)	Winner
1995	The Last Noo-Noo	English 4–11 Outstanding Children's Book of the Year	Shortlisted
1996	The Last Noo-Noo	Sheffield Children's Book Award	Winner
1996	The Last Noo-Noo	Gateshead Gold Award	Winner

== Works ==
The Worst Witch

Main article: The Worst Witch
1. The Worst Witch (1974)
2. The Worst Witch Strikes Again (1980)
3. A Bad Spell for the Worst Witch (1982)
4. The Worst Witch All at Sea (1993)
5. The Worst Witch Saves the Day (2005)
6. The Worst Witch to the Rescue (2007)
7. The Worst Witch and the Wishing Star (2013)
8. First Prize for the Worst Witch (2018)

Large Family picture books

- Five Minutes' Peace (1986)
- All in One Piece (1987)
- A Piece of Cake (1989)
- A Quiet Night In (1993)
- Mr. Large in Charge (2005)
- Laura Bakes a Cake (2008)
- Luke Tidies Up (2008)
- Lester Learns a Lesson (2008)
- Lucy Meets Mr Chilly (2008)
- Grandpa In Trouble (2009)
- Sebastian's Sleepover (2009)
Further information on the television series based on the books: The Large Family

Non-series novels

- Worlds Apart (1988)
- Jeffrey Strangeways (1992)
- Dear Hound (2009)

Non-series picture books

- Peace at Last (1980)
- On the Way Home (1982)
- Whatever Next! (1983)
- The Last Noo-Noo (1995)
- All for One (2002)
- Mother Knows Best! (2011)
- Meltdown! (2016)
- Just One of Those Days (2020)
