= Livewell Southwest =

English community interest company

Livewell Southwest, formerly known as Plymouth Community Healthcare is a community interest company established under the Transforming Community Services programme in 2011.

It employs two mental health teams working within Derriford Hospital, on the wards and in A&E and provide out of hours support to Derriford via on call mental health staff.

It took over social services in the city of Plymouth in April 2015.

In May 2015 it won a four-year contract to deliver Pathways for adults with complex needs for Plymouth, South Hams and West Devon by the Northern, Eastern and Western Devon Clinical Commissioning Group.

It took over the five surgeries of the Plymouth Mayflower Medical Group, with about 40,000 patients, in 2022. It also set up a short-term care centre to help people recover after having hospital treatment, working with Age UK Plymouth.
