= Helston Community Hospital =

- Cornwall Partnership NHS Foundation Trust
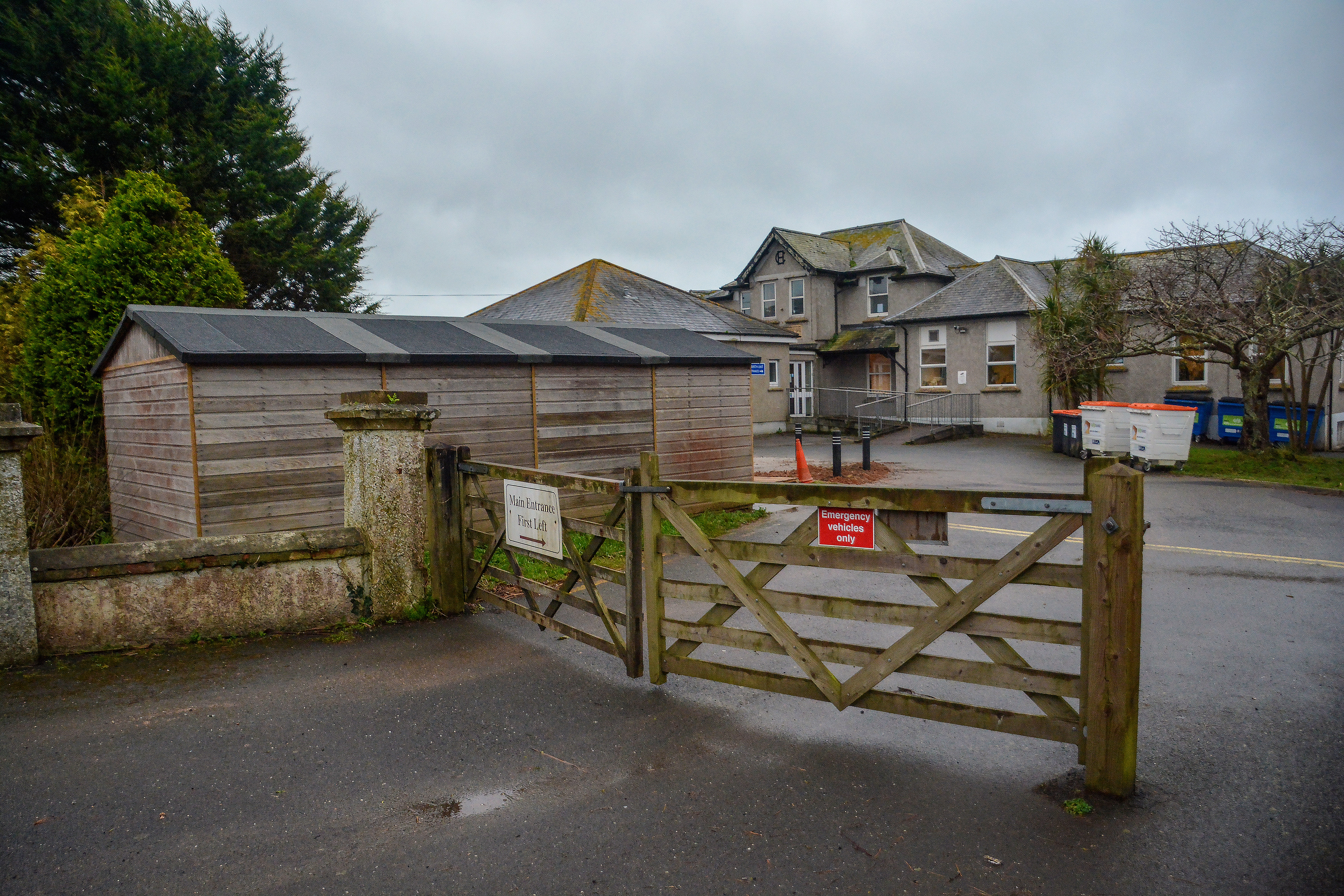
- Helston Community Hospital

- Shown in Cornwall

Geography
- Location: Helston, Cornwall, England, United Kingdom
- Coordinates: 50.0918°N 5.2651°W

Organisation
- Care system: Public NHS
- Type: Community Hospital

Services
- Emergency department: No Accident & Emergency

History
- Founded: 1923

Links
- Website: www.cornwallft.nhs.uk/helston-community/
- Lists: Hospitals in England

Helston Community Hospital is a health facility in Helston, Cornwall, England. It is managed by Cornwall Partnership NHS Foundation Trust.

== History ==
The facility, which was designed and built by E. H. Winn as a lasting memorial to soldiers who died in the First World War, was opened as the Helston Cottage Hospital on 21 May 1923. After joining the National Health Service in 1948, it became Helston Community Hospital in 2008. In June 2018, four beds were closed after a local GP withdrew his support from the hospital.
