= St Austell Community Hospital =

- Cornwall Partnership NHS Foundation Trust
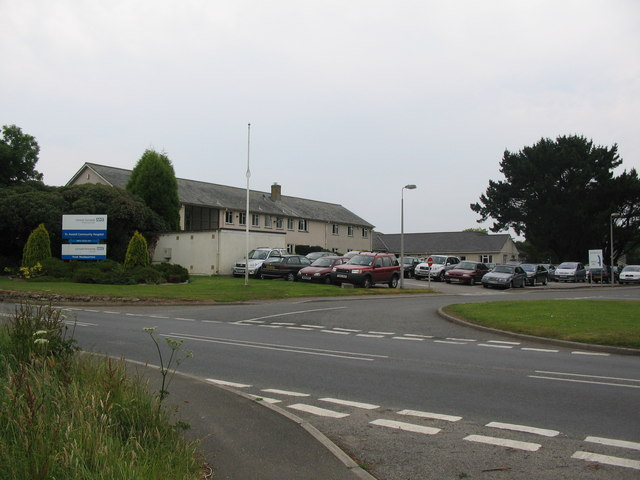
- St Austell Community Hospital

- Shown in Cornwall

Geography
- Location: Porthpean Road, St Austell, Cornwall, England, United Kingdom
- Coordinates: 50.3269°N 4.7726°W

Organisation
- Care system: Public NHS
- Type: Community

History
- Founded: 1970s

Links
- Website: www.cornwallft.nhs.uk/st-austell-community/
- Lists: Hospitals in England

St Austell Community Hospital is a health facility in Porthpean Road, St Austell, Cornwall, England. It is managed by Cornwall Partnership NHS Foundation Trust.

== History ==
The facility was commissioned to replace the aging Sedgemoor Priory Hospital and was the first community hospital in Cornwall that did not pre-date the formation of the National Health Service. It was financed in part by a legacy from Joan Rosemary Cobbold-Sawle and opened as Penrice Hospital in the 1970s. The Mount Edgcumbe Hospice was built on the same site, just to the north of the hospital, and was completed in 1980. In April 2019, the birthing centre at the hospital started providing birthing, postnatal stays and assessment services 24 hours a day, seven days a week.
