= Healthcare in Devon =

Healthcare in Devon has been the responsibility of one integrated care board (ICB) since July 2022. This replaced the former Devon clinical commissioning group (CCG), which was formed in April 2019 by merging the former Northern, Eastern and Western Devon CCG and South Devon and Torbay CCG.

The NHS Devon Integrated Care Board, also known as One Devon, covers the ceremonial county of Devon, which comprises the areas governed by the local authorities of East Devon, Exeter, Mid Devon, North Devon, Plymouth, South Hams, Teignbridge, Torbay, Torridge, and West Devon.

== History ==
From 1947 to 1974 NHS services in Devon were managed by the South-Western Regional Hospital Board. In 1974 the boards were abolished and replaced by regional health authorities. Devon came under the South West RHA. Regions were reorganised in 1996 and Devon came under the South and West (Wessex and South Western) Regional Health Authority. Devon Area Health Authority from 1974 had four district health authorities based in Exeter, North Devon, Plymouth and Torbay. In 1993 Exeter and North Devon were combined, as were Plymouth and Torbay. There were eight primary care trusts established in the county in 2002: North Devon PCT, Mid Devon PCT, Exeter PCT, East Devon PCT, Teignbridge PCT, South Hams and West Devon PCT, Plymouth Teaching PCT and Torbay PCT. Torbay PCT became a care trust in 2005. They were managed by the South West Peninsula Strategic Health Authority from 2002 until 2006. Following the "Commissioning a Patient-Led NHS" restructure, the PCTs in Devon (excluding Plymouth and Torbay) merged to form Devon PCT, overseen by NHS South West.

The clinical commissioning groups (CCG) took on the responsibilities of the former PCTs of NHS Devon, Plymouth and Torbay in April 2013.

Relations between Northern, Eastern and Western Devon CCG and Northern Devon Healthcare NHS Trust were reported by David Flory to have been “strained over the last two years” in 2015. He reported that a “facilitator” had been appointed to support contract negotiations between the two organisations.

North, East and West Devon was one of three areas proposed for the new “success regime” by Simon Stevens in June 2015, in which NHS England will work in partnership with Monitor and the NHS Trust Development Authority to tackle problems in the local health economy. In October 2017 it was announced that the four acute trusts in Devon were to share staff to help tackle workforce deficiencies and to support service standards for the wider population.

== Sustainability and transformation plans ==
In March 2016, Angela Pedder, Chief Executive of Royal Devon and Exeter NHS Foundation Trust was appointed the leader of the Devon Sustainability and transformation plan footprint. She retired in August 2017 and was replaced by Mairead McAlinden from Torbay and South Devon NHS Foundation Trust and Suzanne Tracey from Royal Devon and Exeter NHS Foundation Trust. The plan proposes to make savings of £144 million in 2017/8. At the same time Nick Roberts, who is already chief clinical officer at South Devon and Torbay CCG, is taking over the leadership of Northern, Eastern and Western Devon CCG. 71 inpatient beds across four community hospitals were closed by the Royal Devon and Exeter NHS Foundation Trust in August 2017 as services were moved out of hospital. 170 staff were redeployed into enhanced community teams.

== Primary and community care ==
There are 130 GP practices in Northern, Eastern and Western Devon and 35 in South Devon and Torbay. The GP Patient Survey for 2013/14 showed 18% of patients in South Devon and Torbay had to wait longer than a week to see a GP – better than the national average of 24%. 90% of patients in the area rated their overall experience of GP surgeries as good, above the national average of 86%.

Four practices in Plymouth (all in the marginal Plymouth Sutton and Devonport constituency), were granted a total of £100,000 for improved facilities in March 2015.

In 2019, the Mannamead Surgery in Plymouth with a patient list of about 10,000 announced that it was abandoning its general medical services contract. About 34,000 patients in the city are without a fixed GP.

Out-of-hours services are provided by Devon Doctors, a community interest company, which also runs the Mayflower Medical Group, six practices with about 40,000 patients. In 2021 Mayflower was rated inadequate by the Care Quality Commission and threatened to have its license suspended. Devon Clinical Commissioning Group is running a procurement for a new provider of the practices’ services from April 2022.

== Commissioning ==
Northern, Eastern and Western Devon CCG decided in November 2014 that Royal Devon and Exeter NHS Foundation Trust would be its preferred provider of community services. This decision was challenged by Northern Devon Healthcare NHS Trust which had been providing these services and in February 2015 Monitor announced that it would investigate this complaint. Northern Devon said the decision would mean that it would have to give up ownership of some of its community hospitals. Ownership of twelve of the trust’s community hospitals would “in all likelihood” transfer to NHS Property Services.

As of 2015, the sites that could be affected were:

- Tiverton and District Hospital;
- Honiton Hospital;
- Axminster Hospital;
- Ottery St Mary Hospital;
- Seaton Community Hospital;
- Sidmouth Hospital;
- Exmouth Hospital;
- Budleigh Salterton Hospital;
- Exeter Community Hospital;
- Moretonhampstead Community Hospital;
- Crediton Hospital;
- Okehampton Community Hospital.

In May 2021 Devon Clinical Commissioning Group and Plymouth City Council established a 10-year contract for community, mental health and social care with University Hospitals Plymouth NHS Trust and the Livewell Southwest Community Interest Company. The contract covers a population of around 360,000 and costs £1.6 billion.

== Community services ==
Plymouth Community Healthcare was established under the Transforming Community Services programme in 2011. It took over social services in the city in 2015.

Palliative care is provided by Children's Hospice South West, Hospiscare, Rowcroft Hospice, St Luke's Hospice Plymouth, and North Devon Hospice.

Millbrook Healthcare runs the wheelchair service in Plymouth and South Hams.

In September 2018, it was reported that Devon Children and Families Alliance (composed of the NHS trusts in the county with Livewell Southwest (a community interest company) would get the seven year contract for children's community health and wellbeing services across the county, currently provided by Virgin Care.

== Social care ==
Mears Group won a contract to provide home care services for Devon County Council in March 2016.

In January 2019, arrangements were concluded to enable social workers to access individual children’s electronic health records using the ECLIPSE management system developed with OLM Services. This alerts nurses and social workers if a vulnerable child makes an unscheduled admittance to A&E, or a walk-in centre.

This implementation cost Devon County Council more than a million pounds in internal resource costs, in addition to licence and implementation fees paid to OLM. The Council did not follow any procurement process in selecting this system, which is unusual.

== Hospital services ==
The main hospital providers in the county are University Hospitals Plymouth NHS Trust, Royal Devon University Healthcare NHS Foundation Trust, and Torbay and South Devon NHS Foundation Trust. The leaked Sustainability and transformation plan for the county, intended to tackle a predicted funding gap of £572M in 2020/21, suggested that 600 hospital beds could go, and that most acute services, including the maternity unit, would move from Barnstaple to Exeter and Plymouth. Stroke, vascular service, paediatrics, maternity and ear, nose and throat services would be consolidated onto fewer sites. Community hospital provision would be considerably reduced.

Royal Devon and Exeter NHS Foundation Trust took over Exeter’s NHS walk-in centre from Northern Devon Healthcare NHS Trust in March 2018. It also runs Honiton Minor Injury Unit.

North East and West Devon had 250 patients, the highest number in England, waiting more than 12 months for treatment in November 2018.

== Patient involvement ==
Healthwatch was set up under the Health and Social Care Act 2012 to act as a voice for patients. The county has Healthwatch groups based in Plymouth, Torbay and Exeter.

== Financial pressure ==
Devon was named one of the 11 most financially challenged health economies in the country in 2014. NEW Devon and the two main acute providers – University Hospitals Plymouth NHS Trust and the Royal Devon and Exeter NHS Foundation Trust predict a combined deficit of almost £45M in 2014/5. The CCG has a turnover of £1.1 billion. It has introduced some demand management measures - such as requiring smokers to quit for six weeks prior to routine surgery, and a ban on procedures of low clinical value – because demand for services is outstripping what they can afford. In November 2014, it produced a list of 24 procedures it was considering for decommissioning. It had identified £80M worth of savings and has plans to save up to £159M more from a deficit expected to reach £430M by 2019. Proposals included reorganising beds in community hospitals. According to Rebecca Harriott, chief officer of the NEW Devon Clinical Commissioning Group because of the significant ageing population in the area "we’re experiencing now what many health economies won’t experience for another 20 years’ time in terms of the demographics.”

In December 2014, the CCG announced that in the case of routine surgery for morbidly obese patients – with a body mass index (BMI) greater than 35 – the patient would be required to have a BMI of under 35 or to lose 5 per cent of their weight before planned surgery, whichever is the lesser weight loss. Patients would be required to stop smoking for eight weeks before planned surgery. This explicit rationing was denounced on all sides. Our NHS claimed the "end of the NHS is swimming into focus". Eric Pickles, whose BMI was reported to be 32, and falling said "The idea that you would say “You will not survive, you’ve had your chips, you are too fat, you smoke too much…” Exeter MP Ben Bradshaw told Nick Clegg that he would be denied an operation in Devon because he smokes, as would Pickles because he’s too big. Pickles retorted that since he had lost weight he would not now fall foul of the policy. The CCG announced that it was caving in to the pressure and would no longer impose a ban, but would "further promote smoking cessation and weight loss services to improve outcomes for patients".

The CCG also abandoned a plan to restrict patients to only one hearing aid.

NEW Devon CCG ended 2014-15 with a cumulative deficit of £38.9M and expected this to increase to £78.9M (after savings of £37.1M) by the end of 2015-16, the largest cumulative deficit of any CCG in England. The success regime board headed by Ruth Carnall estimated in February 2016 that without change services in NEW Devon would be in deficit of £442 million by 2020/1. By that time nearly 25% of the population will be over 65.

In May 2017 it was given new legal directions after it ended 2016-17 with a £42M deficit.

== Mental health ==
Mental health services in the county are largely provided by Devon Partnership NHS Trust.

In December 2014, Paul Netherton, assistant chief constable of Devon and Cornwall Police, complained publicly after a 16-year-old girl suffering mental health issues was held in a custody cell in Devon for around 48 hours because there were “no beds available in the UK”. 750 mentally ill people – including 28 children – had been detained in police custody in the county during 2014. Adolescents with mental health problems in Devon have been sent to units in Hull, Newcastle and Lancashire, and several vulnerable young people in the county have also been admitted to adult psychiatric units. Ben Bradshaw MP for Exeter complained that the chronic shortage of appropriate accommodation for young people and the chaos and confusion was caused by the Government’s disastrous reorganisation of the NHS "because there are now so many different organisations involved in commissioning and providing services, no-one takes ultimate responsibility."

There has been an increase in the number of people presenting at the A&E Department at Derriford. In 2012, there were 2,700. In 2013:2,908. In 2014: 3,346.

In August 2019, it was reported that autistic children and teenagers were waiting to be assessed following a referral for an average of 67 weeks with the longest recorded wait 122 weeks. There were 1800 on the waiting list. Devon CCG was looking for new autism assessment providers. According to Virgin Care, who provided the service from 2013 to April 2019, demand increased by 20% per year throughout the operation of the contract. The waiting list continued to rise after the contract had been given back to an NHS consortium – Children and Family Health Devon. By February 2021, there were more than 3,200 under-18s waiting for an assessment and average waiting time had risen to 81 weeks.

== See also ==
- Category:Health in Devon
- Healthcare in the United Kingdom
