= Derriford Hospital =

Hospital in Plymouth, Devon

- University Hospitals Plymouth NHS Trust
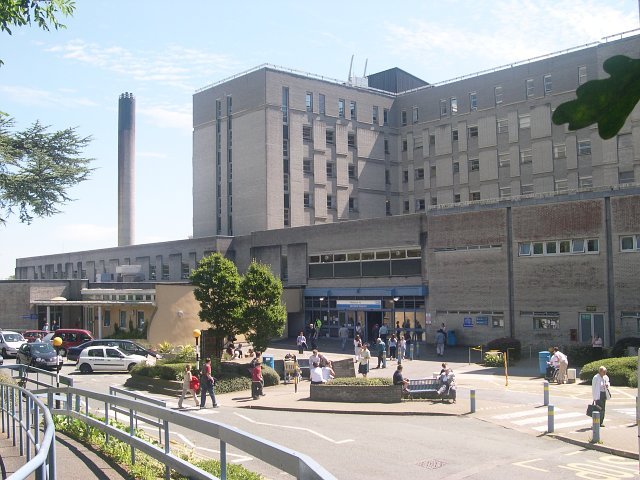
- The front entrance to the Hospital in 2008

- Location in Devon

Geography
- Location: Derriford, Plymouth, England
- Coordinates: 50.4162°N 04.1141°W

Organisation
- Care system: NHS
- Type: Teaching, Military
- Affiliated university: Peninsula Medical School

Services
- Emergency department: Major Trauma Centre
- Beds: 1,000

History
- Founded: 9 June 1981 (official opening)

Links
- Website: www.plymouthhospitals.nhs.uk

Derriford Hospital is a large teaching hospital in Plymouth, England. The hospital serves Plymouth and nearby areas of Devon and Cornwall. It also provides tertiary cardiothoracic surgery, neurosurgery, renal transplant surgery, and immunology/allergy for the whole of the South West Peninsula. It is managed by the University Hospitals Plymouth NHS Trust. It was designated a major trauma centre in 2013. A helipad capable of night operation was opened in 2015, to replace the existing daytime-only grass pad. The hospital is used for clinical training of medical students from the Plymouth University Peninsula School of Medicine. It is one of five hospitals with attached Ministry of Defence Hospital Units to cater to service personnel.

== History ==
In 1950, there was a proposal for a single hospital for the Plymouth area. The regional hospital board decided that this would be built at Derriford, at the cost of £2 million (equivalent to £59,200,000 in 2025). The planned hospital was expected to have around 900 beds, and would be built service by service as the other hospitals around Plymouth are closed. After all services transferred from Plymouth General Hospital and renal services started transferring from the Freedom Fields Hospital, Derriford Hospital officially opened in 1981 and became the primary hospital in Plymouth. When it opened, two wards were allocated to create a school for hospitalised children. The school continued to provide education for 30 years until it was replaced by the newly opened Plymouth Hospital and Outreach School in 2011.

In August 2011, a purpose-built dialysis unit was added to the hospital. In 2012, the Peninsula Trauma Centre opened, designated nationally as a major trauma centre, receiving 400 patients by air ambulance each year. In 2015, a new helipad was built at a cost of £1.7M. The helipad is large enough to accept search and rescue helicopters, and was the first in the region to allow night time landings.

In 2022, the helipad was subject of a major incident when a woman was killed by a HM Coastguard helicopter. One woman was also seriously injured.

== Facilities ==
Derriford hospital is the regional (tertiary) centre in Devon and Cornwall for Adult Cardiothoracic (Heart and Lung) surgery and Neurosurgery.

In 2016, more than 48,000 people used the hospital each week, accessing 900 beds and 1,000 car parking spaces. The bus terminal at the hospital is the second largest in Plymouth.

== See also ==
- Healthcare in Cornwall
- Healthcare in Devon
- List of hospitals in England
