= Bodmin Hospital =

- Cornwall Partnership NHS Foundation Trust
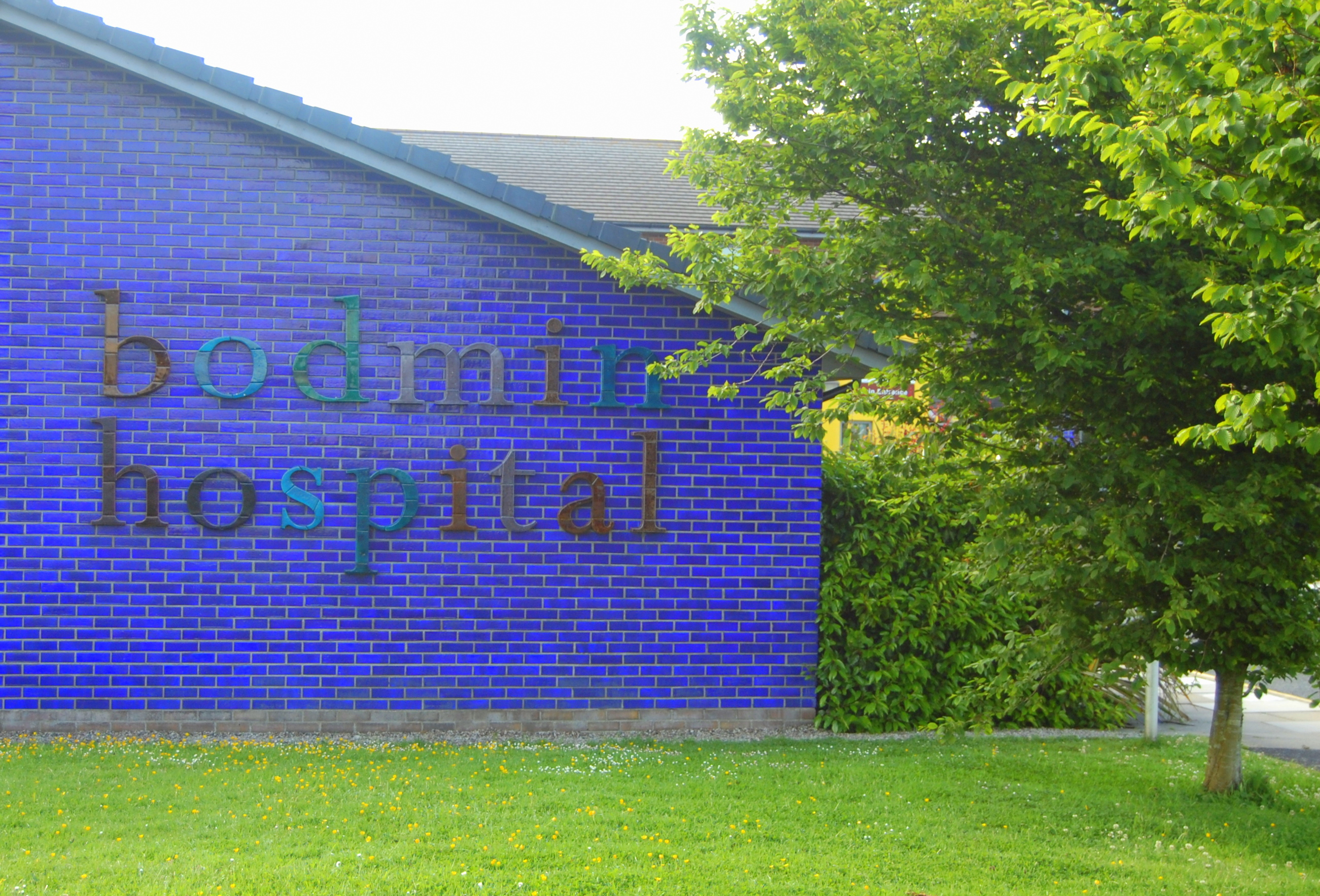
- Bodmin Hospital

- Location in Cornwall

Geography
- Location: Bodmin, Cornwall, England, United Kingdom
- Coordinates: 50.4672°N 04.7414°W

Organisation
- Care system: Public NHS

Services
- Beds: unknown

History
- Founded: 2002

Links
- Website: www.cornwallft.nhs.uk/hospitals/bodmin/
- Lists: Hospitals in England

Bodmin Hospital (Cornish: Klavji Bosvena) is a community hospital in Bodmin, Cornwall, England. It is managed by the Cornwall Partnership NHS Foundation Trust.

== History ==
A new facility was procured under a Private Finance Initiative contract in 2000 to replace both St Lawrence's Hospital and the old East Cornwall Hospital. The new hospital was built at a cost of £10 million and was opened by Charles, Prince of Wales in 2002.

== Services ==
The hospital has five psychiatric and dementia wards, plus two wards for physical health and well-being. Services include an X-ray department, a dental clinic and a psychiatry department. A new young person's mental health unit, the 14-bed Sowenna unit, was built in 2018.

== Art ==
The construction of the new hospital was an opportunity for art to be integrated into the fabric of the building at the design build stage. Roger Michell was appointed Artist in Residence. He worked alongside the architects, engineers, builders, landscape architects, interior designers and project managers to identify opportunities for incorporating art into the building and landscape. He undertook the signage and some of the creative projects such as the cobalt blue glazed wall pictured, as well as commissioning work from other, local artists including Danka Napiorkowska who produced three sand blasted panels of flowers with fibre optic lights running along the surface of the petals. Above the entrance to the hospital is a large oil painting depicting boats in the harbour painted by John Blight.

== See also ==
- Healthcare in Cornwall
- List of hospitals in England
