= Camborne Redruth Community Hospital =

- Cornwall Partnership NHS Foundation Trust
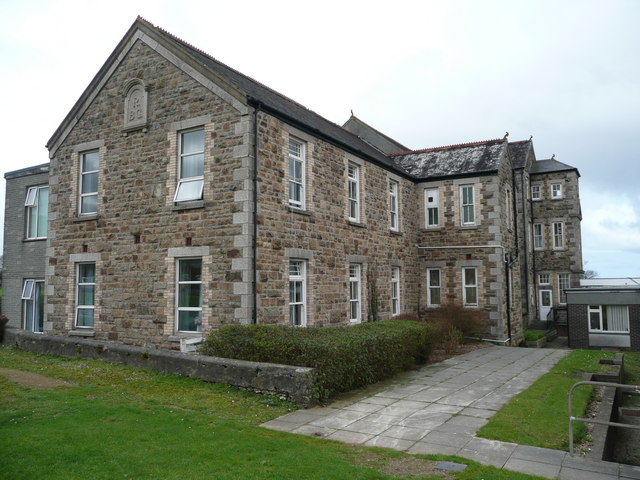
- Camborne Redruth Community Hospital

- Shown in Cornwall

Geography
- Location: Barncoose, Redruth, Cornwall, England, United Kingdom
- Coordinates: 50.229°N 5.245°W

Organisation
- Care system: Public NHS
- Type: Rehabilitation
- Affiliated university: None

Services
- Emergency department: Minor Injury Unit
- Beds: 61 Beds

Links
- Website: www.cornwallft.nhs.uk/camborne-redruth-community/
- Lists: Hospitals in England

The Camborne Redruth Community Hospital is a National Health Service hospital in Cornwall, England. It is managed by Cornwall Partnership NHS Foundation Trust.

== History ==
The hospital has its origins in the Redruth Mines Infirmary, which was largely financed by Lord Robartes and completed in 1863. An accident ward was added in 1871. The West Cornwall Women's Hospital was completed on an adjacent site in 1899, and the two hospitals amalgamated in 1901.

The amalgamated facility became the West Cornwall Miners and Women's Hospital in 1915 and the Camborne-Redruth Miners and General Hospital in 1940. It joined the National Health Service as the Camborne-Redruth Hospital in 1948 and, following a major redevelopment of the site in 2002, the old hospital building was converted into flats and the new medical facilities became known as the Camborne Redruth Community Hospital.

== Services ==
The hospital has in-patient beds catering for rehabilitation and stroke, as well as a Minor Injuries Unit with X-ray facilities.

== See also ==
- Healthcare in Cornwall
- List of hospitals in England
