= Carlton Ware =

English pottery manufacturer

- Industry: Pottery
- Founded: 1890 as Wiltshaw and Robinson
- Founders: James Frederick Wiltshaw, William Herbert Robinson, James Alcock Robinson
- Headquarters: Stoke-on-Trent, England

Carlton Ware was a pottery manufacturer based in Stoke-on-Trent. The company is known for its tableware, often in the form of highly decorated leaves or fruit, and the ceramic toucans it made as promotional items for Guinness. It produced hand-painted domestic pottery in high art deco styles during the 1920s and 1930s.

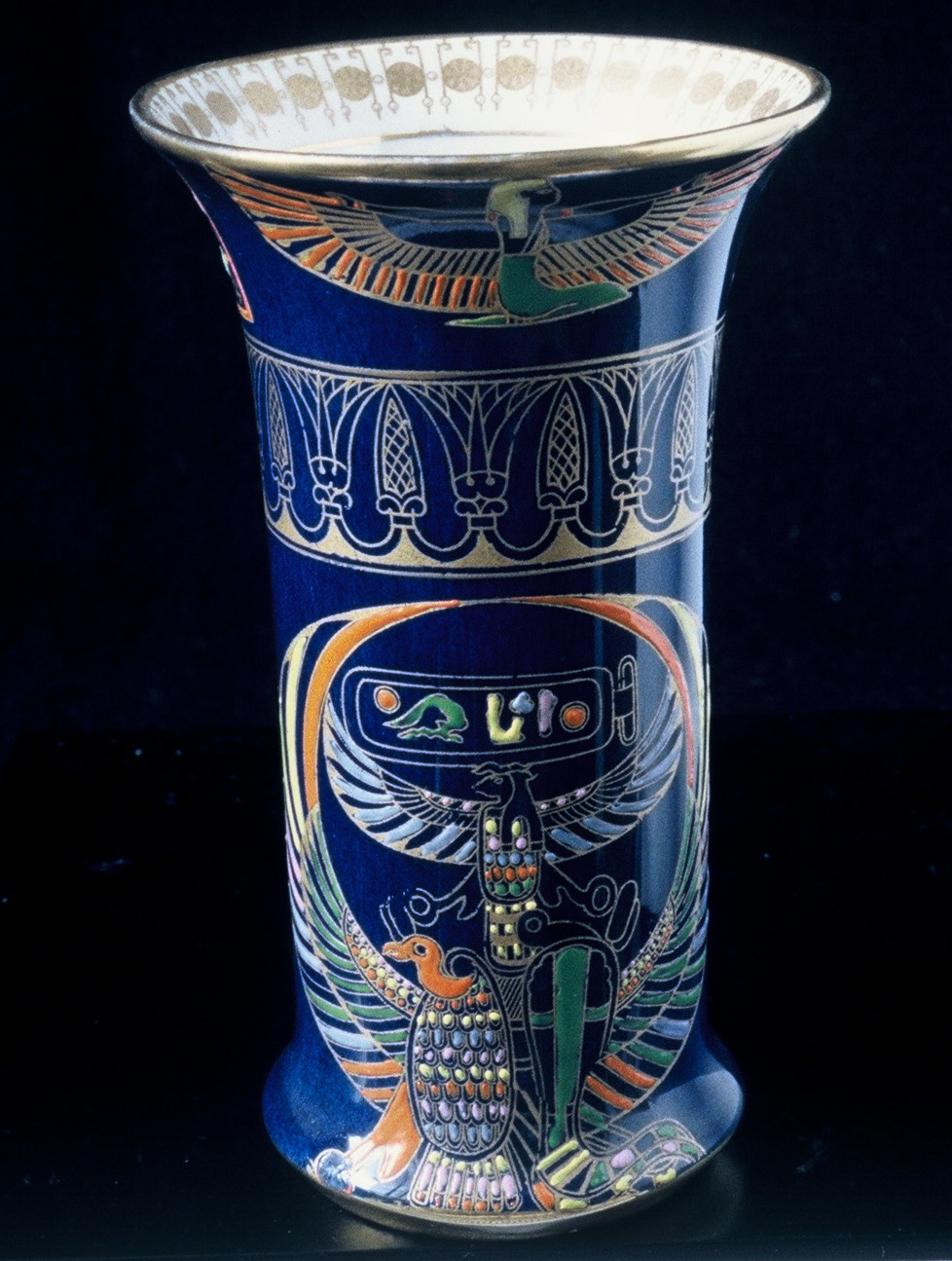
"Tutenkahmen" vase, 1920s

== History ==
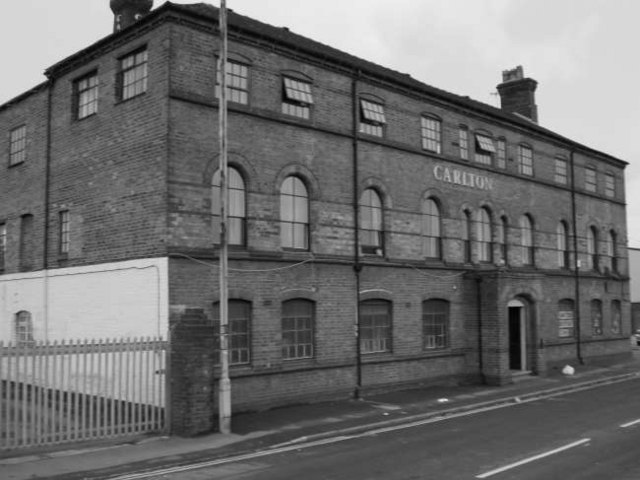

The company was established in 1890 by James Frederick Wiltshaw, William Herbert Robinson and James Alcock Robinson trading under the name of Wiltshaw and Robinson. The trademark "Carlton Ware" was introduced in 1894, and the company's factory was renamed the Carlton Works.

In 1911, the business partnership between Wiltshaw and the Robinsons was dissolved, leaving Wiltshaw to form a new limited company called Wiltshaw and Robinson Limited. Following the death of James Wiltshaw in 1918, due to an accident at Stoke-on-Trent railway station, control of the company passed to his son Frederick Cuthbert Wiltshaw. The company continued to expand, acquiring Birks, Rawlins and Co. in 1930.

Wiltshaw's wife, Alice, was brutally murdered on 16 July 1952, during a robbery at the couple's home 'Estoril', a large 14 room house at Barlaston, Staffordshire. Leslie Green, who had previously worked as a chauffeur for the family, was convicted of the murder and hanged at Winson Green Prison on 23 December 1952 by Albert Pierrepoint.

The company was renamed Carlton Ware Limited in 1958 and following the death of Frederick Cuthbert Wiltshaw in 1966, the company was sold to Arthur Wood and Sons. The company continued to trade well until developing serious financial difficulties in the late 1980s, which forced it into receivership in 1989. An unsuccessful attempt was then made to rescue the company by Grosvenor Ceramic Hardware, with production finally ending in 1992.

In 1997 the Carlton Ware brand was resurrected by Francis Joseph of the Carlton Ware Design Centre, Roslyn Works, Stoke-on-Trent. It continues to manufacture novelty items aimed at the collectors' market.

== Products ==
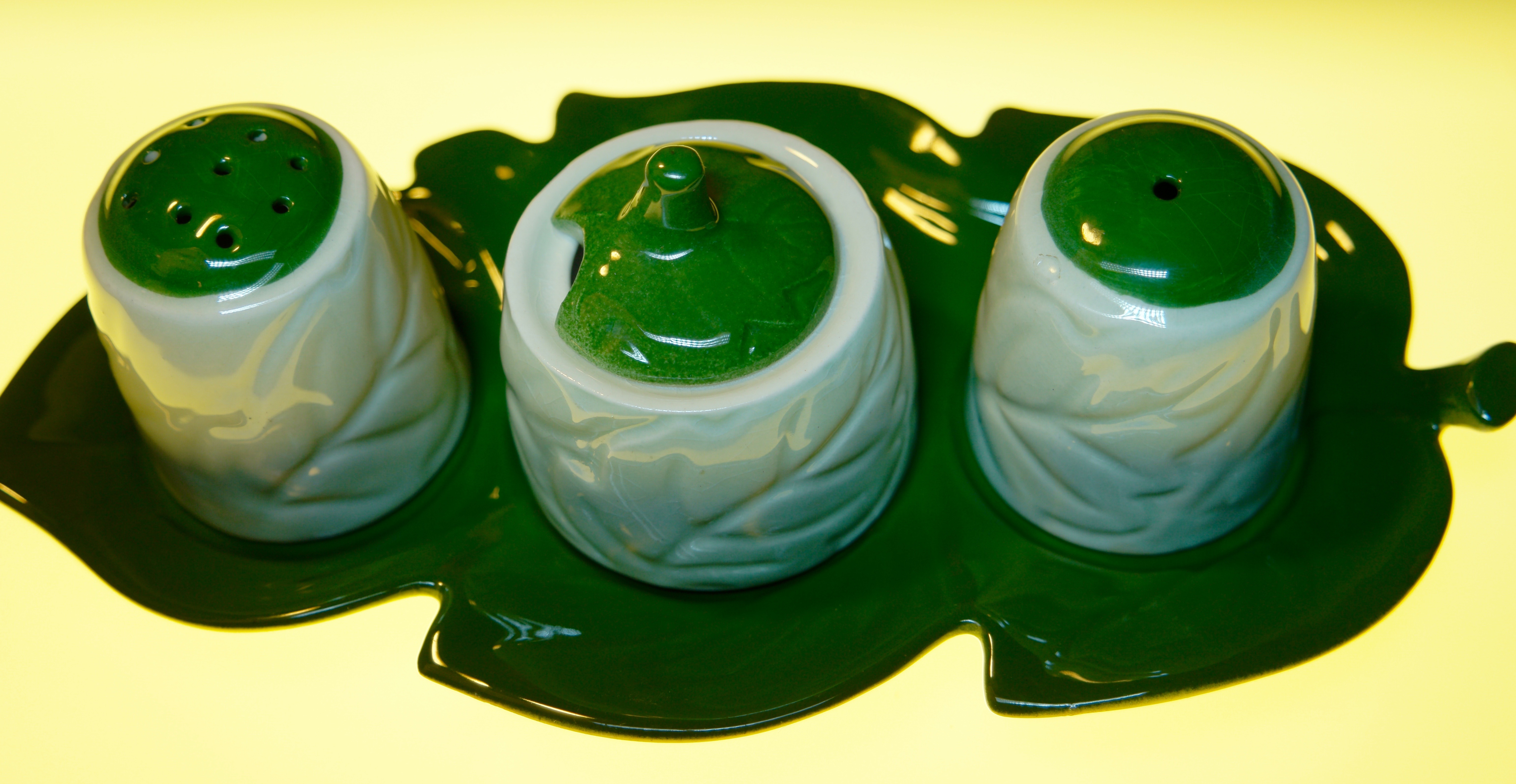
Carlton Ware cruet set, Australian leaf design c.1950s.

Carlton Ware concentrated on the decorative giftware end of the domestic pottery market throughout most of its career. Its earliest works included typical decal and hand-painted table-ware in a range of mostly floral patterns as well as items inspired by Wedgwood and other respected potters. During the early 1900s they became a supplier of "crested ware" for the tourist market.

During the 1920s the company introduced new methods of production where the decal and hand-painting work was applied to high-glaze substrates. Amongst the first of these were a series of designs inspired by the artwork discovered in Tutankhamen's tomb, which can be fairly said to represent the beginning of the art deco pottery movement. Other popular designs included stylised dragons, birds, and a series of Oriental-inspired patterns of which New Mikado and Chinoiserie were the most popular. Mottled, mostly pale blue lustre-ware was also sold under the separate "Armand" brand. The famous script "Carlton Ware" trademark was introduced in 1928. At the more mundane end of the market, Carlton Ware introduced the first "Oven to Table" ware in 1929.

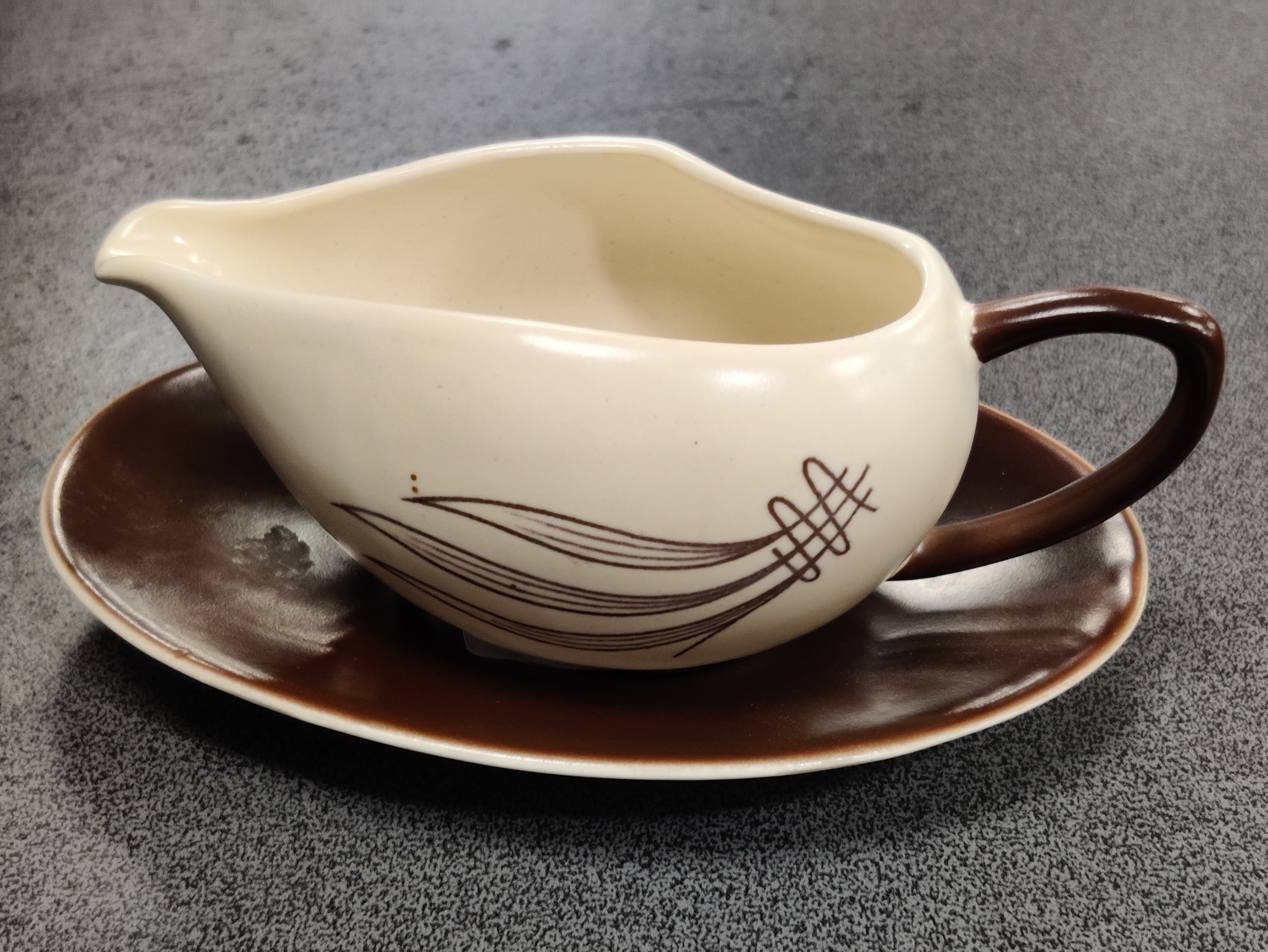
Hand-painted Carltonware sauce boat

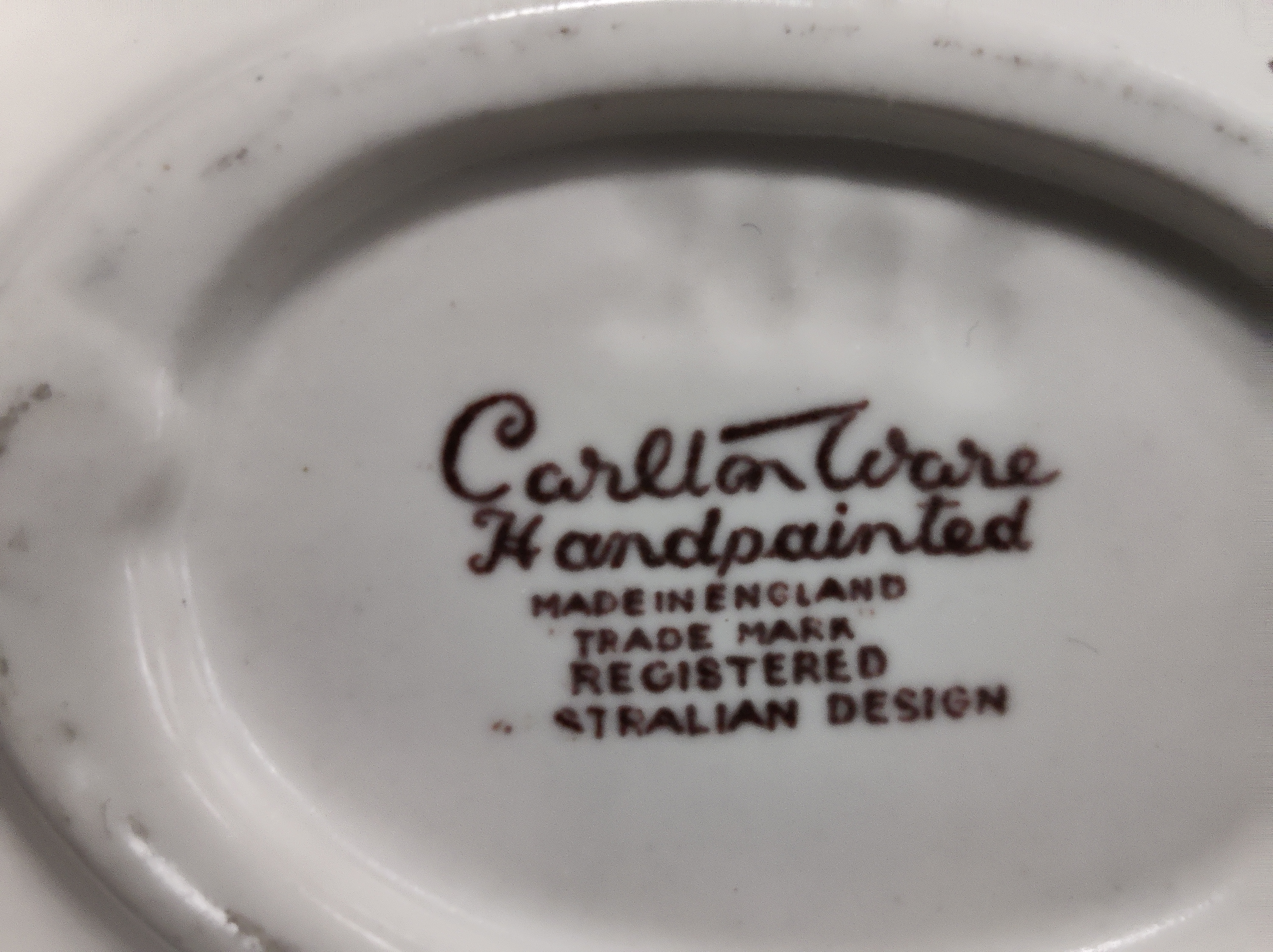
Makers' mark from the above sauce boat (the final line reads "Australian Design")

During the late 1930s Carlton Ware introduced a new series of table-ware, with boldly embossed floral and foliage patterns such as fox-glove and anemone. This series continued in unbroken production into the 1960s, although later designs were progressively simplified to reduce the high cost of hand-painting.

The availability of new techniques using automated high temperature kilns allowed improved high-lustre table ware in the "Royale" brand to be introduced in 1949, and this continued to be produced into the early 1970s.

By the 1970s, the need to pass on increasing fuel and labour costs seriously affected Carlton Ware's ability to continue producing elaborate hand-painted items and changing tastes dictated the introduction of more modern shapes and patterns. The company then concentrated on novelty items such as "Walking Ware" designed by potter Roger Michell and advertising ware, especially aimed at the liquor trade, until its demise.

== See also ==
- Wilton Ware
