= Royal Cornwall Hospital =

Royal Cornwall Hospital Klavji Riel Kernow
- Royal Cornwall Hospitals NHS Trust
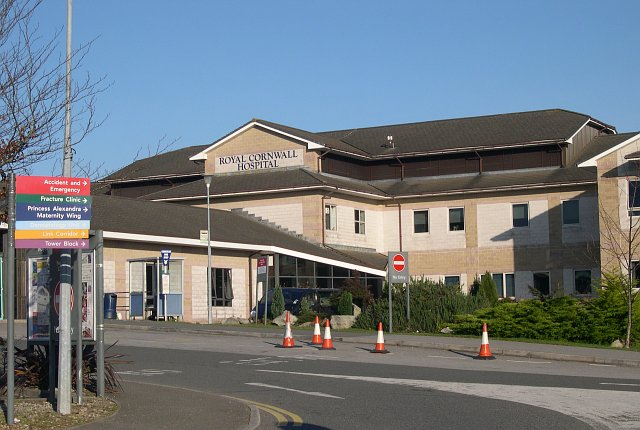
- Entrance to the Royal Cornwall Hospital

- Shown in Cornwall

Geography
- Location: Treliske, Truro, Cornwall, England, United Kingdom
- Coordinates: 50.2667°N 05.0916°W

Organisation
- Care system: National Health Service
- Type: Teaching
- Affiliated university: University of Exeter Medical School; University of Plymouth School of Nursing and Midwifery; Peninsula Dental School

Services
- Emergency department: Yes Accident & Emergency
- Beds: 760

Helipads
- Helipad: Yes

History
- Founded: 1968

Links
- Website: royalcornwallhospitals.nhs.uk/our-hospitals/royal-cornwall-hospital-truro/
- Lists: Hospitals in the United Kingdom

The Royal Cornwall Hospital (Cornish: Klavji Riel Kernow), formerly and still commonly known as the Treliske Hospital, is a teaching hospital in Treliske, on the outskirts of Truro, Cornwall, England. The hospital provides training services for the University of Exeter Medical School, as well as Plymouth University Dental School. It is managed by the Royal Cornwall Hospitals NHS Trust.

== History ==
The new hospital at Treliske, which initially included 180 beds and six wards, was opened by Princess Alexandra on 12 July 1968. In 1969 the hospital helped investigate the mummy of the priest, Iset-tayef-nakht, including carrying out X-rays. Services were transferred from the Royal Cornwall Infirmary to the Royal Cornwall Hospital in the mid-1990s.

The Trelawny Wing, named after Sir Jonathan Trelawny, was built at a cost of £27 million and officially opened in 1998. The work, which took six years of planning and development, marked the completion of the conversion of the Royal Cornwall Hospital into the main district general hospital for Cornwall. The wing ensured facilities in Cornwall were equal to those found in any of the other district general hospitals in the country.

David Cameron's younger daughter was born in the Princess Alexandra Maternity Unit, named after the princess who opened the hospital, while Cameron and his wife Samantha were on holiday in Cornwall in August 2010.

During the early 2020s, the hospital underwent significant redevelopment to modernise facilities and meet rising demand for services across Cornwall and the Isles of Scilly. Major investment included the opening of a new MRI suite and Haematology and Oncology Unit, providing expanded cancer diagnostics and treatment space, alongside upgrades to CT imaging for radiotherapy planning. The hospital also introduced the Tremenel Unit, creating additional capacity for frailty care and same-day emergency services. At the same time, detailed planning began for a new Women and Children’s Hospital and integrated Pathology Hub.

== See also ==
- Healthcare in Cornwall
- List of hospitals in England
