= Ruth Carnall =

NHS manager

Dame Ruth Carnall DBE (born July 1956) was the last Chief Executive of NHS London before it was abolished in 2013. Ruth has worked at all levels of the NHS for over 30 years and worked as an independent consultant with various public and private sector clients. These included the Department of Health, Monitor, Health Authorities, NHS Trusts, pharmaceutical companies as well as the Prime Minister's Delivery Unit, the Cabinet Office, the Home Office and the Ministry of Justice. Ruth also has experience as a non-executive Partner of a public company, chair of a private company and trustee of a charity. She was described by the Health Service Journal as one of the NHS's most senior and respected leaders.

She is a member of the Honours Committee of the Cabinet Office and was herself created a Dame Commander of the Order of the British Empire in the 2011 Birthday Honours. She is a trustee of the King's Fund.

Her first job in the NHS was in finance at St Mary's Hospital, London in 1977. Her first chief executive job was in Hastings. She became the regional director for the South East - where she was a civil servant - in 2000. She was appointed chair of the success regime programme board in Northern, Eastern and Western Devon in October 2015.

She is Chairman of CF (formally Carnall Farrar), which she co-founded with Hannah Farrar. CF is a healthcare management consultancy and analytics firm, dedicated to improving health and care. She was subsequently reckoned by the Health Service Journal to be the 37th most influential person in the English NHS in 2015.

== Personal life ==
Her husband and business partner is Professor Colin Anthony Carnall (born 1947).
