= Wilton Ware =

Wilton Ware, a brand of English pottery, was the brand name of A.G.Harley-Jones factory. Wilton Ware was produced in Fenton, Stoke on Trent, Staffordshire, England from 1904 to 1934.

Horace Wain left Carlton Ware and became the designer for the factory in the early 1920s.

== Trade marks ==
A.G. Harley Jones's pottery was sold under the trade names "Wilton Ware" and "Fentonia Ware", among others. The pottery is usually marked with the initials "HJ" or "AGHJ".

== Designs ==
The following registered designs are recorded at UK Public Records Office.

1925 711819 711820 711821

1926 723362 723363 723364

1927 726366 726367 726368 726369

726366 726367 Mikado (1927)

== History ==
The firm of A. G. Harley Jones was founded in 1901 by Arthur George Harley Jones. The company manufactured ornamental pottery. William Percival Jervis, a contemporary potter in the Arts and Crafts movement, noted Harley Jones's expertise in using underglaze colors. Jervis also lauded the firm's work in transfer printing of photographs onto pottery. Around 1920, Harley Jones's firm began to manufacture practical earthenware in addition to ornamental pieces. The firm went bankrupt in 1934, having switched its focus to manufacturing fireplace tiles a year earlier.
