= University Hospitals Plymouth NHS Trust =

NHS hospital trust

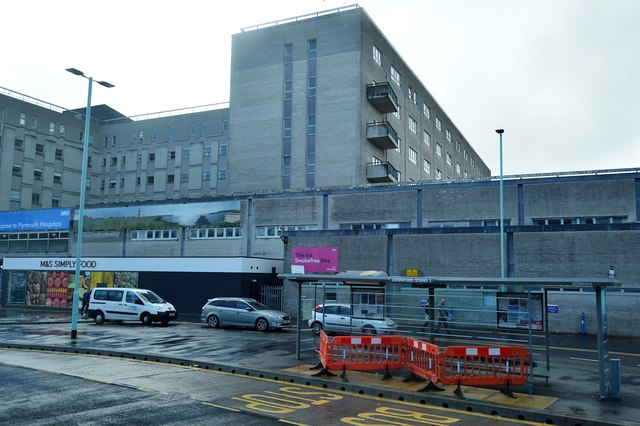
- Derriford Hospital, headquarters of University Hospitals Plymouth NHS Trust
- Former name: Plymouth Hospitals NHS Trust
- Type: NHS hospital trust
- Established: 1 November 1993
- Headquarters: Derriford Hospital, Plymouth, Devon PL6 8DH
- Region served: Plymouth, West Devon and South East Cornwall, England
- Establishments: Derriford Hospital; Royal Eye Infirmary; Mount Gould Hospital; South Hams Community Hospital; Tavistock Hospital
- Chair: Richard Crompton
- Chief executive: Mark Hackett (Interim)
- Website: www.plymouthhospitals.nhs.uk

University Hospitals Plymouth NHS Trust, formerly known as Plymouth Hospitals NHS Trust is the organisation which runs Derriford Hospital, and the co-located Royal Eye Infirmary (REI), as well as Mount Gould Hospital and the Child Development Centre in Plymouth, Devon. The trust is an NHS trust that provides secondary health services in Plymouth and surrounding areas. It is one of six centres used by the Defence Medical Services.

== History ==
The Plymouth Hospitals NHS Trust was established on 1 November 1993, managing services provided by Derriford Hospital and associated sites, previously ran by Plymouth and Torbay Health Authority. It was announced in January 2018 that the Trust would be changing its name to University Hospitals Plymouth NHS Trust. This was to reflect its collaboration with University of Plymouth and with the Plymouth University Peninsula Schools of Medicine and Dentistry. The change came into effect on the 1 April 2018.

== Trust ==
The trust runs Derriford Hospital, the Royal Eye Infirmary since 2013, Mount Gould Hospital and Plymouth's Child Development Centre. It also manages community midwifery services in Plymouth, runs clinics, and manages the Peninsula Radiology Academy. In 2021, University Hospitals Plymouth also began mnanaging South Hams Hospital and Tavistock Hospital.

It had planned to integrate with Livewell Southwest, a local social enterprise providing integrated health and social care services which was set up as a community interest company in 2011 as part of the Transforming Community Services initiative, however this integration was quietly cancelled following the discovery that continuing the integration would have been illegal.

In October 2018, the trust decided to move all its non-urgent orthopaedic surgery, about 200 cases a month, to the nearby Peninsula Treatment Centre, which is run by Care UK, in order to free up space at Derriford Hospital during the winter. In the winter of 2017, it was forced to fill an orthopaedic ward with medical emergency patients. The operations were still conducted by the trust's staff. In July 2021 it planned to bring surgery for high-complexity patients back in-house. At that point 50 patients had waited more than two years for orthopaedic treatment at the trust, and 2,655 longer than a year. In August 2018 only 151 patients had waited longer than a year.

The trust does not have an alongside midwifery led unit as recommended by the National Institute for Health and Care Excellence. It only offers services at patients’ homes and on its labour ward.

== Performance ==
The trust has recorded a financial deficit each year since 2010 and expected to continue to do so for the next five years. The trust cancelled 648 operations at the last minute for non-clinical reasons between January and March 2015 - the highest number of any trust in England.

The trust has an arrangement with BMI Healthcare for cardiac surgery performed by the trust's own surgeons at the London Independent Hospital. This is mainly valve replacements and coronary artery bypass grafts. Patients usually spend 5–8 days in hospital and are admitted the night before to take account of travelling.

The Northern, Eastern and Western Devon Clinical Commissioning Group gave the trust a £2.4 million advance payment in November 2015 to help its cash balance. In February 2016, it was expecting a deficit of £36M for the year.

According to the British Orthopaedic Association, the Peninsula Trauma Centre at Derriford was the best in the country in 2016 for treating open fractures.

From the NCIP data published by NHS England in 2025, Derriford hospital has the second lowest peri-operative mortality (90-day) following lung cancer resection surgery (<0.5%) in England.

In the winter of 2019–20, the trust had severe problems in the A&E department with waiting times reaching eight hours (against the NHS target of four hours) repeatedly and the trust declaring an OPEL Level 4 major crisis. In September 2021 Care Quality Commission inspectors found six patients being treated “on the floor” of the A&E department while another was being assessed and triaged in a “storeroom” because the department was too small to meet the current levels of demand. The trust has secured funding to expand the department but progress is controlled by the government's New Hospitals Programme.

== See also ==
- Healthcare in Cornwall
- Healthcare in Devon
- List of hospitals in England
- List of NHS trusts
