= Cornwall Partnership NHS Foundation Trust =

NHS community trust

- Former name: Cornwall Partnership NHS Trust
- Established: 1 March 2010
- Region served: Cornwall and Isles of Scilly
- Chair: Margaret Schwarz
- Chief executive: Debbie Richards
- Staff: 5,600
- Website: Official website

Cornwall Partnership NHS Foundation Trust provides community health services to children and young people and mental health and learning disability services to people of all ages across Cornwall and the Isles of Scilly.

== History ==
The Cornwall Healthcare NHS Trust was established in April 1993 before becoming the Cornwall Partnership NHS Trust in April 2002. The Trust achieved NHS foundation trust status in March 2010.

In 2006, the Commission for Social Care Inspection and the Healthcare Commission mounted a joint investigation into widespread institutional abuse of people with learning difficulties in the Trust.

In August 2014, it was revealed that the Trust was considering a merger with Peninsula Community Health and that the Chief Executive of Royal Cornwall Hospitals NHS Trust was also interested in participating.

In 2016, Fowey Community Hospital was closed due to safety concerns. A committee meeting was held on 12 March 2025 to decide on the future of the site.

In January 2018, the trust said it was owed £2.1m by Cornwall Council under the contract for adult community services which it took over in April 2016.

It set up a new unit, Cove Ward at Longreach in Redruth in March 2018 as a fast-track rehabilitation service, and to avoid patients being sent out of the area.

Debbie Richards, the chief executive, announced in May 2022 that almost half of the community hospital beds were occupied by patients who have no medical need to be in hospital but could not be discharged because of the shortage of adult social care provision, especially specialist dementia placements, for which there was particularly low capacity in Cornwall.

== Sites ==
The Trust manages the following sites:

Hospitals

- Bodmin Hospital
- Camborne Redruth Community Hospital
- Falmouth Community Hospital
- Helston Community Hospital
- Liskeard Community Hospital
- Launceston Community Hospital
- Newquay Community Hospital
- St Austell Community Hospital
- St Barnabas Community Hospital
- St Mary's Community Hospital, Isles of Scilly
- Stratton Community Hospital

Other sites

- Longreach House

== See also ==
- Healthcare in Cornwall
- List of NHS trusts
