= Plymouth General Hospital =

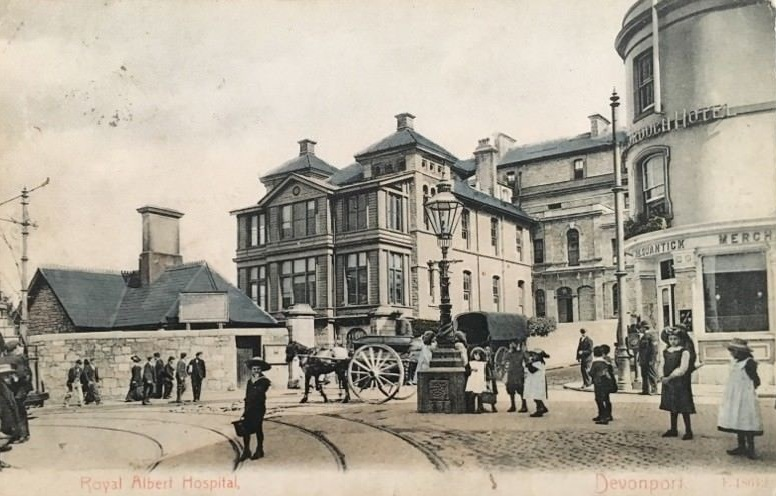
- The Royal Albert Hospital (as it was originally known)

- Shown in Devon

Geography
- Location: Plymouth, United Kingdom
- Coordinates: 50.375°N 4.184°W

Organisation
- Care system: Public NHS
- Type: General

History
- Founded: 1862
- Closed: 1981

Links
- Lists: Hospitals in the United Kingdom

Plymouth General Hospital was an acute general hospital in Plymouth, Devon.

== History ==
The hospital has it origins in the Dock and Stonehouse Public Dispensary established in Chapel Street, Devonport in 1815. This facility became too small and a new hospital was sponsored by Dr Thomas Woolcombe in the 1850s.

The foundation stone for the new hospital was laid by the Earl of Mount Edgcumbe in June 1862. It was designed by Alfred Norman in the Italianate style and built by Messrs Jenkin and Hallett on New Passage Hill. It was named after Prince Albert, the late consort to Queen Victoria, and opened as the Royal Albert Hospital in December 1863. The hospital became the Royal Albert Hospital and Eye Infirmary in 1874 and, after a new nurses' home was completed in May 1901, it became the Prince of Wales Hospital in 1934. On joining the National Health Service in 1948, it became the South Devon and East Cornwall Hospital (Devonport). It finally became Plymouth General Hospital in 1963.

After services transferred to the Derriford Hospital, the old hospital closed in 1981 and it was demolished in 1983.
