= Freedom Fields Hospital =

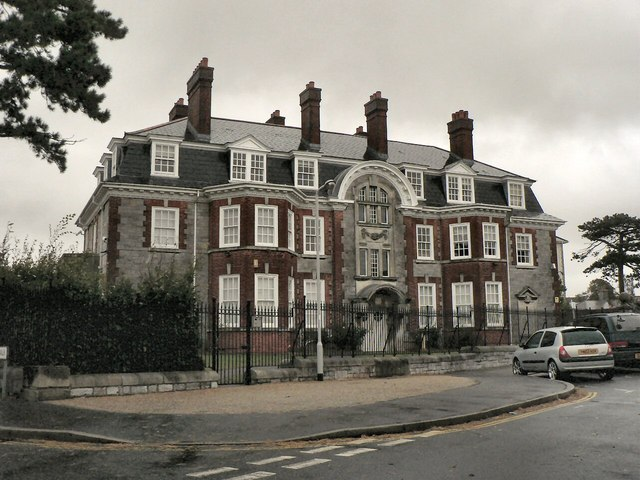
- Freedom Fields Hospital

- Shown in Devon

Geography
- Location: Plymouth, United Kingdom
- Coordinates: 50.3785°N 4.1289°W

Organisation
- Care system: Public NHS
- Type: General

History
- Founded: 1858
- Closed: 1998

Links
- Lists: Hospitals in the United Kingdom

Freedom Fields Hospital was an acute hospital in Plymouth that closed in 1998. The site formerly occupied by the hospital has now been largely redeveloped for residential use.

== History ==
The facility was designed by Arthur and Dwelly as a workhouse and built on a site to the east of the junction of Longfield Place and Greenbank Road between 1852 and 1858. Enlargements included a major expansion of the medical facilities between 1907 and 1910. It became the Greenbank Infirmary in 1909 and the Plymouth City Hospital in 1930.

The building was bombed several times in attacks on the areas surrounding Plymouth Sound during the Second World War. One young girl was killed in a ward block on the night of 13 January 1941 and, shortly after a new maternity block had been opened by Lord Astor, six nurses, nineteen babies and one mother were killed in that block on the night of 20 March 1941. After it joined the National Health Service in 1948, it was renamed Freedom Fields Hospital.

Renal services transferred to the new Derriford Hospital in 1982, maternity services transferred there in 1994 and the remaining services transferred in February 1998. The site has now been largely redeveloped for residential use.
