= Cornwall Hospice Care =

Charity-funded hospice in Cornwall, England

Cornwall Hospice Care is a charity-funded hospice based in Cornwall, England, established in 1980 providing palliative care.

It operates Mount Edgcumbe Hospice in St Austell and St Julia's Hospice in Hayle. From 1999 until 2006 the two hospices were run as separate charities though with a single Board of Trustees and one senior management team. As of 2014, it cost £8.4 million a year to run the organisation, but only 11% of this was funded by the NHS, much less than the national funding average of 34% for hospices.

The Wolfson Foundation provided a grant of £88,000 towards a major refurbishment of Mount Edgcumbe Hospice in 2013. In 2021 the Freemasons of Cornwall made a grant of £29,895 intended to make hospice care more accessible to people who have been homeless or have had HIV or substance abuse problems.

In 2022 it moved its fundraising charity shop from Penryn, Cornwall to Church Street, Falmouth, Cornwall. It sells vintage and retro clothes, bric-a-brac, books, and homewares.
