= Royal Cornwall Hospitals NHS Trust =

NHS hospital trust

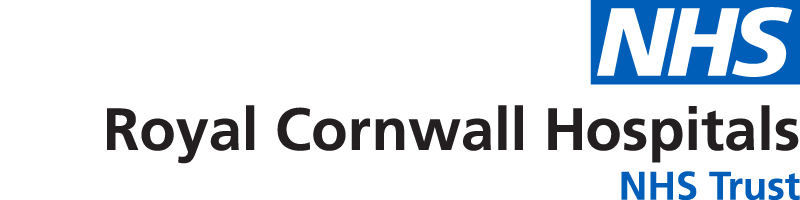
- Type: NHS trust
- Established: 1 November 1991
- Headquarters: Treliske, Truro
- Hospitals: Royal Cornwall Hospital; St Michael's Hospital; West Cornwall Hospital
- Staff: 5,377 (2018/19)
- Website: royalcornwallhospitals.nhs.uk

The Royal Cornwall Hospitals NHS Trust is an NHS trust which runs West Cornwall Hospital, St Michael's Hospital, Royal Cornwall Hospital, and St Austell Hospital - Penrice Birthing Unit, in Cornwall, England.

== History ==
The trust was established as the Royal Cornwall Hospitals and West Cornwall Hospital NHS Trust on 1 November 1991, and became operational on 1 April 1992. It changed its name to its current name soon after on 9 June 1992.

In June 2013, Martin Watts resigned from his post as Chair of the Trust after external investigations into two separate complaints were upheld.

In October 2013, one of the trust's governors complained that the health and social care system in the county was dysfunctional because some elements of health care were no longer part of the NHS, but provided by what were "essentially private contractors". Community health services in the county are now provided by Cornwall Partnership NHS Foundation Trust.

The trust's plans to switch up to 450 jobs in catering, housekeeping, cleaning, portering, waste and switchboard functions to private companies were attacked by local Labour Party candidates in December 2013.

In January 2019, the trust decided to move elective orthopaedic work out of Treliske to St Michael's Hospital in Hayle, in order to protect the waiting list from the pressure of emergencies. This made room for a frailty unit at Treliske.

The trust was one of the biggest beneficiaries of Boris Johnson's announcement of capital funding for the NHS in August 2019, with an allocation of £100 million for a new women's and children's hospital in Truro.

== Performance ==
The trust was one of 26 responsible for half of the national growth in patients waiting more than four hours in accident and emergency over the 2014/5 winter.

The trust established a cleaning contract with Mitie in 2014 worth £90M over seven years. Sick pay cost £1.2M in its first eight months compared with £280,000 for the NHS in the previous financial year. UNISON blamed the rise on staff stress which it claimed had been caused by mistakes on pay.

In October 2015, Bill Shields, the interim chief executive announced his resignation. The human resources director, company secretary, the interim chief operating officer and the interim director of financial recovery are also leaving. The Care Quality Commission (CQC) inspected the hospital in June 2015 and rated safety in medical care and the accident and emergency department as “inadequate”.

In the last quarter of 2015, it had one of the worst performances of any hospital in England against the four-hour waiting target.

In March 2016, the trust was rated as having a poor reporting culture in the Learning from Mistakes League. In October 2017, the CQC reported that patients were waiting too long for treatment and suffering harm as a result. There were long delays in cardiology and ophthalmology and unacceptable levels of operations canceled. There were shortages of midwives, and midwives were insufficiently equipped and trained They recommended that the trust be placed in special measures. In 2019, it was fined a total of £16,250 for 13 separate breaches of the NHS statutory duty of candour after it failed to notify the patient or their family of the facts available in a safety investigation as soon as reasonably possible.

Performance against the four-hour target improved from 56.6% in February 2018 to 94.1% in April. Sixty care home beds were purchased through the Better Care Fund with Cornwall Council, the number of homecare providers was increased from 20 to 40 and homecare workers were paid the National Living Wage.

In the twelve months to September 2018, the trust was at OPEL level 4 – a major crisis requiring external help – for 134 days, the worst in England, with operations repeatedly cancelled.

In 2018, the CQC rated the trust as requiring improvement.

When Scan4Safety was introduced in its pharmacies the trust managed to reduce dispensing errors by 76%.

In 2022 89 patients waited in A&E longer than 48 hours for a bed in April and May with 865 patients waited in the ED longer than 24 hours in the same period.

== See also ==
- Healthcare in Cornwall
- List of NHS trusts
