= Healthcare in Cornwall =

Healthcare in Cornwall has been the responsibility of one integrated care board (ICB) since July 2022. This replaced the former Kernow clinical commissioning group (CCG).

The NHS Cornwall and Isles of Scilly Integrated Care Board, covers the ceremonial county of Cornwall, which comprises the areas governed by the local authorities of Cornwall and the Isles of Scilly.

== History ==
From 1947 to 1974, NHS services in Cornwall were managed by the South-Western Regional Hospital Board. In 1974 the boards were abolished and replaced by regional health authorities. Cornwall came under the South West RHA. Regions were reorganised in 1996 and Devon came under the South and West (Wessex and South Western) Regional Health Authority. Cornwall and Isles of Scilly constituted a district health authority from 1974 until 2002 when Cornwall and Isles of Scilly Primary Care Trust was established. This was managed by the South West Peninsula Strategic Health Authority from 2002 until 2006 when that was merged into NHS South West. The PCT and the strategic health authority were abolished in 2012.

A report by the Care Quality Commission in October 2017 found that the county's health and social care system ‘is not working well together’, that different parts of the system are not working together to ensure people can move between services as they need them, and that too many people were stuck in hospital waiting for a social care package or a place in a residential establishment.

In 2022, the Health and Care Act 2022 was introduced by the government, that included the abolishment of clinical commissioning group and its replacement by the Integrated care system, a statutory partnership of organisations who prepare, buy, and provide health care services in their geographical area.

== Sustainability and transformation plans ==
In July 2015 a devolution deal, the Deal for Cornwall, was announced by the government under which Cornwall Council and the Council of the Isles of Scilly are to create a plan to bring health and social care services together under local control.

The Sustainability and transformation plan says that the 13 community hospitals in the area with a total capacity of 314 beds are not used effectively, not fit for purpose and are not sustainable. It proposes to develop integrated community care hubs primarily for care of the elderly and to integrate NHS 111 and the out-of-hours service. The CCG’s savings target for 2017/8 is £29.6 million but it has "no viable plan" to achieve this.

Royal Cornwall Hospitals NHS Trust and Cornwall Partnership NHS Foundation Trust established a joint board in July 2017 to “gradually unite clinical and non-clinical services" - a step towards the creation of an accountable care system.

In March 2018, after protests, Cornwall Council announced that it was abandoning proposals to establish an Accountable Care System but they would continue to support the integration of health and care services. They said they would strengthen the existing Health and Wellbeing Board to become a more effective decision making body. Cllr Andy Virr, the Conservative health spokesperson, said that kind words regarding working together were vacuous without a commitment to integrate and combine budgets.

== Commissioning ==
Kernow Clinical Commissioning Group was placed under legal directions by NHS England in December 2015. It has a budget of £728.7 million and expects a deficit of £14 million for 2015/16. It is required to have a turnaround director in place. Keith Pringle, who had previously worked with CCGs in Hampshire and at Gloucestershire Hospitals NHS Foundation Trust was employed at a cost of £396,000 in 2015/6 including agency fees.

Cornwall was one of the four areas chosen to trial the integration of specialised commissioning, previously run by NHS England centrally, in September 2016.

In September 2017 it was forecasting a £37 million deficit and had “no viable plan” to hit its control total, a £19.9 million deficit on its allocated £765 million, in the financial year.

The clinical commissioning group proposed in October 2017 that it would no longer pay for non-emergency patient transport to hospital patients who frequently travel to hospital. The policy would particularly impact kidney dialysis patients, who typically have to visit hospital three times a week. The service has been supplied by E-zec Medical Transport Services Ltd. since summer 2016.

In December 2017 it was announced that Cornwall Council was to take over the functions of Kernow Clinical Commissioning Group as part of the development of an accountable care system for the county. Services are to be provided by one or more “accountable care partnerships” led by the existing NHS providers. According to Cllr Rotchell “Cornwall Council will ultimately become the strategic commissioner for all healthcare for Cornwall that is commissioned by the CCG. The longer term plan is that the CCG becomes a department within Cornwall Council and we will buy services from the providers.”

== Primary and Community Care ==
There are 69 GP practices in the county. St Mary’s hospital on the Isles of Scilly is a small community hospital with a Minor Injuries Unit run by Peninsula Community Health which also runs community hospitals all over Cornwall. The Out-of-hours service contract, worth £8m a year, from 2015 was awarded to Devon Doctors, a GP led social enterprise, and Kernow Health CIC, a community interest company run by member practices. The consortium will operate under the name Cornwall Health. In 2017 it was announced that a £48m contract for Out-of-hours service GP and 111 services had been awarded to a consortium of Royal Cornwall Hospitals NHS Trust, Kernow Health Community Interest Company and Vocare.

Palliative care is provided by Cornwall Hospice Care.

During 2015 there was a programme funded with £44.5m from the Better Care Fund intended to ensure care packages were available for patients leaving hospitals in Cornwall but between July and September a total of 3,815 hospital bed days were lost because of problems with social care packages, compared with 2,255 days for the same period in 2014, meaning that there were 69% more delays in discharging people from hospital.

Community services were provided by Peninsula Community Health from 2011 but from April 2016 will be taken over by a consortium of Royal Cornwall Hospitals NHS Trust, Cornwall Partnership NHS Foundation Trust and Kernow Health CIC.

In May 2017 there was a backlog of 14,000 people unable to register with an NHS dentist in the county. Waiting times for routine appointments were up to eighteen months.

Cornwall Council confirmed Mears Group as lead strategic partner for the delivery of extra care in Cornwall with a seven year agreement for 750 extra care housing units worth £150 million.

== Healthwatch ==
Healthwatch was set up under the Health and Social Care Act 2012 to act as a voice for patients. There is one Healthwatch for Cornwall and a separate Healthwatch for the Isles of Scilly.

== Mental health ==
NHS mental health services in the county are largely provided by Cornwall Partnership NHS Foundation Trust. According to the trust between 8 and 12 patients a month have to be sent out of Cornwall, because there is an "inadequate provision" of beds.

== Hospital and acute care ==
Royal Cornwall Hospitals NHS Trust provides hospital care in the west of the county. University Hospitals Plymouth NHS Trust serves the east. Specialised services are provided from other trusts outside the area. Cornwall Air Ambulance was the first dedicated helicopter emergency medical service operational in the United Kingdom. The Duchy Hospital in Truro run by Ramsay Health Care UK is the only private hospital in the County. It has 27 in-patient beds.

In May 2015 it was reported that Cornwall Partnership NHS Foundation Trust and Royal Cornwall Hospitals NHS Trust were considering a merger. In March 2022 it was announced, after prolonged and repeated delays, that the merger would not be going ahead.

Cornwall had 134 patients, the second-highest number in England, waiting more than 12 months for treatment in November 2018

Staff at South Western Ambulance Service NHS Foundation Trust reported 29 serious incidents in Cornwall between October and December 2021 during an inspection by the Care Quality Commission. The inspectors reported that exhaustion was leading to “high levels of staff sickness and staff resignations” with high vacancy rates for nursing staff in adult social care services. They also found a “lack of joined up communication across the system has resulted in people facing lengthy delays as they wait for assessment and treatment”. In August 2022 the average waiting time for category 2 calls was “hovering around 200 minutes when the national target response time is 18 minutes. Nearly half of the trust’s community beds were occupied by patients who were medically fit to leave but waiting to be placed in their next care setting.

== See also ==
- Healthcare in the United Kingdom
