= Carleton (given name) =

Carleton is a given name.

Those bearing it include:

- Carleton Watkins (1829–1916), American photographer
- Carleton Clement (1896–1917), Canadian fighter pilot
- Carleton Bartlett Gibson (1863–1927)
- Carleton Coon (musician) (1898–1932), American musician of Coon-Sanders Original Nighthawk Orchestra
- Carleton Wiggins (1848–1932), American painter
- Carleton Tufnell (1856–1940), English cricketer
- Carleton Ellis (1876–1941), American chemist
- Carleton Winslow (1876–1946), American architect
- (Ernest) Carleton Bass (born 1876), Irish-born bullfighter in U.S.
- Carleton Rea (1861–1946), English botanist
- Carleton Lewis Brownson (1866–1948), American classical-languages scholar and academic administrator
- George Carleton Lacy (1888–1951), American missionary in China
- Carleton O'Brien (1903–1952), American racketeer
- Carleton Roy Ball (1873–1958), American botanist
- Carleton Bruns Joeckel (1886–1960), American librarian and scholar
- Carleton F. Burke (died 1962), American horse breeder and racer, namesake of Carleton F. Burke Handicap
- Carleton Raymond Mabley (1878–1963), American automotive entrepreneur
- Carleton Kemp Allen (1887–1966), Australian-born British academic
- Carleton Washburne (1889–1968), American educator
- Carleton Kendrake, pseudonym of Erle Stanley Gardner (1889–1970), American lawyer and novelist
- Carleton H. Wright (1892–1970), American naval officer
- Carleton Garretson Young (1907–1971), American actor
- Carleton J. King (1904–1977), American politician
- Carleton Lamont MacMillan (1903–1978), Canadian physician and politician
- Carleton Beals (1893–1979), American journalist
- Carleton Harris (1909–1980), Justice of the Arkansas Supreme Court
- Carleton S. Coon (1904–1981), American anthropologist
- Robert Carleton Smith (1908–1984), American arts administrator
- Carleton G. Howe (1898–1993), American orchardist and politician
- Carleton Young (1905–1994), American actor
- Carleton Putnam (1901–1998), American entrepreneur
- Carleton Weir Elliott (1928–2003), Canadian musician
- Daniel Carleton Gajdusek (1923–2008), American medical researcher
- Carleton Naiche-Palmer (1947–2010), American native-tribe politician
- Carleton Opgaard (1929–2014), American academic administrator
- Carleton Mabee (1914–2014), American writer
- Carleton Upham Carpenter, Jr. (1926–2022), American performer
- Carleton Hoffner Jr. (1931–2020), American figure skater
- Carleton Perry (1931–2017), American politician
- Carleton "Carty" S. Finkbeiner (born 1939), American politician
- Carleton H. Sheets (born 1939), American real-estate entrepreneur
- Carleton D. Powell (born 1939), American jurist
- Carleton Oats (born 1942), American football player
- Cara Carleton "Carly" Fiorina (born 1954), American business executive and political candidate
- Carleton Leonard (born 1958), English footballer
- Carleton Scott (born 1988), American basketball player
- Carleton Olegario Máximo, nominal author of thousands of works reprinted from Wikipedia content
- Carleton E. Carey Sr. (fl. c. 2010), American politician

== See also ==
- Carlston (name)
