= Carlton =

Carlton may refer to:

== People and fictional characters ==
- Carlton (given name), a list of people and fictional characters
- Carlton (surname), a list of people and a fictional character
- Carlton, a pen name used by Joseph Caldwell (1773–1835), American educator, Presbyterian minister, mathematician and astronomer

== Places ==
=== Australia ===
- Carlton, New South Wales, a suburb of Sydney
- Carlton, Tasmania, a locality in Tasmania
- Carlton, Victoria, a suburb of Melbourne

=== Canada ===
- Carlton, Edmonton, Alberta, a neighbourhood
- Carlton, Saskatchewan, a hamlet
- Fort Carlton, a Hudson's Bay Company fur trading post built in 1810, near present-day Carlton, Saskatchewan
- Carlton Trail, a historic trail near Fort Carlton
- Carlton Street, Toronto, Ontario

=== England ===
- Carlton, Bedfordshire, a village
- Carlton, Cambridgeshire, a village
- Carlton, County Durham, a village and civil parish
- Carlton, Leicestershire, a village
- Carlton Scroop, Lincolnshire
- Carlton, Nottinghamshire, a suburb to the east of Nottingham
  - Carlton (UK Parliament constituency), abolished in 1983
- Carlton in Lindrick, Nottinghamshire
- Carlton-on-Trent, Nottinghamshire
- Carlton, Suffolk, a village near Saxmundham
- Carlton Colville, Suffolk, next to Lowestoft
- Carlton, a hamlet in the parish of Helmsley, North Yorkshire
- Carlton, Hambleton, North Yorkshire, a civil parish
- Carlton, Richmondshire, North Yorkshire, a village
- Carlton, Selby, North Yorkshire, a village and civil parish
- Carlton, South Yorkshire, a village in the Metropolitan Borough of Barnsley
- Carlton, Rothwell, West Yorkshire, a village
- Carlton, Wharfedale, West Yorkshire, a civil parish
- Carlton Vale, street in London, England

=== United States ===
- Carlton, Alabama, an unincorporated community
- Carlton, Colorado, an unincorporated community
- Carlton, Georgia, a city
- Carlton Township, Tama County, Iowa
- Carlton, Kansas, a city
- Carlton Township, Michigan, in Barry County
- Carlton County, Minnesota
  - Carlton, Minnesota, a city and the county seat
- Carlton Peak, Cook County, Minnesota
- Carlton, New York, a town
- Carlton, Oregon, a city
- Carlton, Texas, an unincorporated community
- Carlton, U.S. Virgin Islands, a settlement
- Carlton, Washington, an unincorporated community
- Carlton, Wisconsin, a town

== Businesses and brands ==
- Carlton Car Company, whose output was four cars constructed in Gisborne, New Zealand, in the 1920s
- Carlton Carriage Company, a defunct English coachbuilder from Willesden, North London, UK
- Carlton Cards, a Canadian greeting card company
- Carlton Cinema, Dublin, Ireland
- Carlton Communications, a former media company in the United Kingdom
- Carlton Cycles, an English bicycle maker in Nottinghamshire, absorbed by Raleigh Bicycle Company in 1960
- Carlton Hotel (disambiguation)
- Carlton Hotels & Suites, a multinational hospitality company in the Middle East
- Carlton Publishing Group, a UK book publishing company, with three imprints
- Carlton Records, American record label between 1957 and 1964
- Carlton Screen Advertising, an Irish cinema screen advertising brand, now called Wide Eye Media
- Carlton Sports, a manufacturer of badminton racquets and shuttlecocks
- Carlton Tavern, a former pub in Kilburn, London
- Carlton Television, a former television broadcasting company in the United Kingdom
- Carlton Theatre, a former West End theatre in London, now a cinema
- Carlton Ware, English Stoke-on-Trent commercial pottery
- Carlton Draught, an Australian beer
- Vauxhall Carlton, a series of executive cars produced by Vauxhall Motors
  - Lotus Carlton, a modified version of the Vauxhall Carlton
- Carlton, a brand of cigarettes produced by American company Brown & Williamson
- Carlton Sports Network, a defunct Sri Lankan television channel

== In sports ==
- Carlton Cricket Club (Barbados)
- Carlton Football Club, a professional Australian rules football club in the Australian Football League
- Carlton S.C., a defunct Australian association football (soccer) club
- The Carlton (LPGA Tour), a golf tournament

== Other uses ==
- The Carlton Academy, a secondary school in Nottinghamshire, England
- Carlton Centre, a skyscraper and shopping centre located in downtown Johannesburg, South Africa
- Carlton Club, a members-only club in London
- Carlton Dramatic Society, an amateur dramatics group in Wimbledon, London
- Carlton House (disambiguation)
- Carlton Towers, a country house in Carlton, North Yorkshire
- The Carlton, a dance routine by Carlton Banks in The Fresh Prince of Bel-Air

== See also ==
- Carlton Hill (disambiguation)
- Carleton (disambiguation)
- Charlton (disambiguation)
- Calton (disambiguation)
