= Carleton (surname) =

Carleton is a surname. Notable people with the surname include:

- Alex Carleton (born 1968), American fashion and home-goods designer
- Anita Carleton, American software engineer
- Billie Carleton (1896–1918), British actress
- Bridget Carleton (born 1997), Canadian basketball player
- Charles A. Carleton (1836–1897), American Union Civil War era brevet brigadier general
- Christopher Carleton (1749–1787), British Army officer
- Claire Carleton (1913–1979), American actress
- Dudley Carleton, Viscount Dorchester (1573–1632), English statesman and diplomat
- Dudley Carleton (diplomat) (1599–1654), nephew of the above, diplomat and clerk of the Privy Council
- Ezra C. Carleton (1838–1911), U.S. Representative from Michigan
- George Carleton (1529–1590), prosecuted for involvement in the Marprelate controversy
- George Carleton (bishop) (1559–1628), Bishop of Llandaff
- George W. Carleton, publisher, New York, (1832–1901), published the books of Miriam Coles Harris.
- George Carleton (1885–1950), American character actor
- Guy Carleton (bishop) (1605–1685), Anglican clergyman
- Guy Carleton, 1st Baron Dorchester (1724–1808), governor of Quebec and a general of British troops during the American War of Independence
- Henry Boyle, 1st Baron Carleton (1669–1725), English politician
- Hugh Carleton (1810–1890), New Zealand politician
- Isaac Newton Carleton (1832–1902), founder of Carleton School for Boys in Bradford, Massachusetts
- James Henry Carleton (1814–1873), American major general
- Jesse Carleton (1862–1921), American golfer
- John Carleton (disambiguation)
- Marie-Helene Carleton, American writer, photographer and filmmaker
- Mark A. Carleton (1866–1925), American botanist and plant pathologist
- Mark T. Carleton (1935–1995), Louisiana historian
- Mary Carleton (1642–1673), Englishwoman who used false identities to marry and defraud a number of men
- Nicholas Carleton (c. 1570 – 1630), English composer
- Peter Carleton (1755–1828), U.S. Representative from New Hampshire
- Richard Carleton (1943–2006), Australian journalist
- Robert Louis Carleton (1896–1956), American composer who wrote "Ja-Da!"
- Thomas Carleton (c. 1735 – 1817), first lieutenant governor of New Brunswick
- Walter Tenney Carleton (1867–1900), one of the three founding directors of NEC Corporation
- Wayne Carleton (born 1946), retired Canadian ice hockey player
- William McKendree "Will" Carleton (1845–1912), American poet, who wrote mostly about rural life
- William Carleton (1794–1869), Irish novelist
- William Carleton (Massachusetts businessman) (1797–1876), American businessman
- William P. Carleton (1872–1947), American actor
