= Paddington Recreation Ground =

Large park in City of Westminster, est. 1888

Coordinates: 51.530239°N 0.191394°W

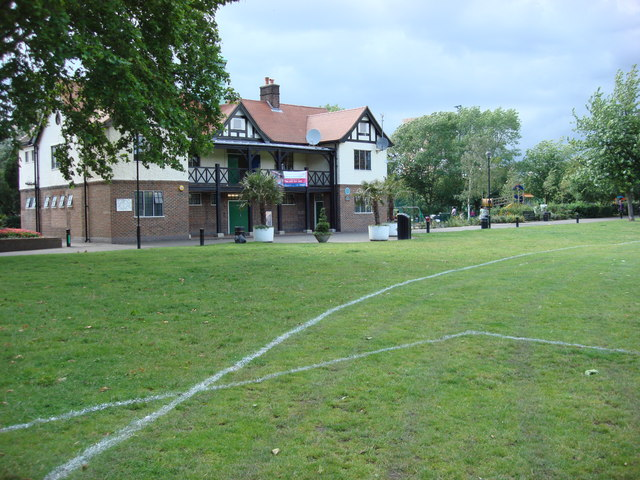
Paddington Recreation Ground

Paddington Recreation Ground is a park in Maida Vale, City of Westminster, just north of Paddington. Its 27-acre site is the largest area of parkland located entirely within the City of Westminster. It was the first park of its kind in London, having operated since 1888. Annually, it attracts over 1.5 million users, who visit the Recreation Ground for its green-space value.

It is located just off Randolph Avenue between Carlton Vale and Elgin Avenue. The area covered by the park has "Conservation Area" status.

== History ==
The Paddington Recreation Ground was "the earliest public athletic ground of its kind in London". It was first used for recreational purposes in 1860 when the local church laid down a cricket pitch for the parish community to share.

During the 1880s, Richard Beachcroft, secretary of Paddington Cricket Club, led the initiative to formalise and extend the cricket ground by forming a committee of local cricket clubs and negotiating arrangements with local landowners. The pavilion was renamed "The Richard Beachcroft Pavilion" in 2010 to recognise this work.

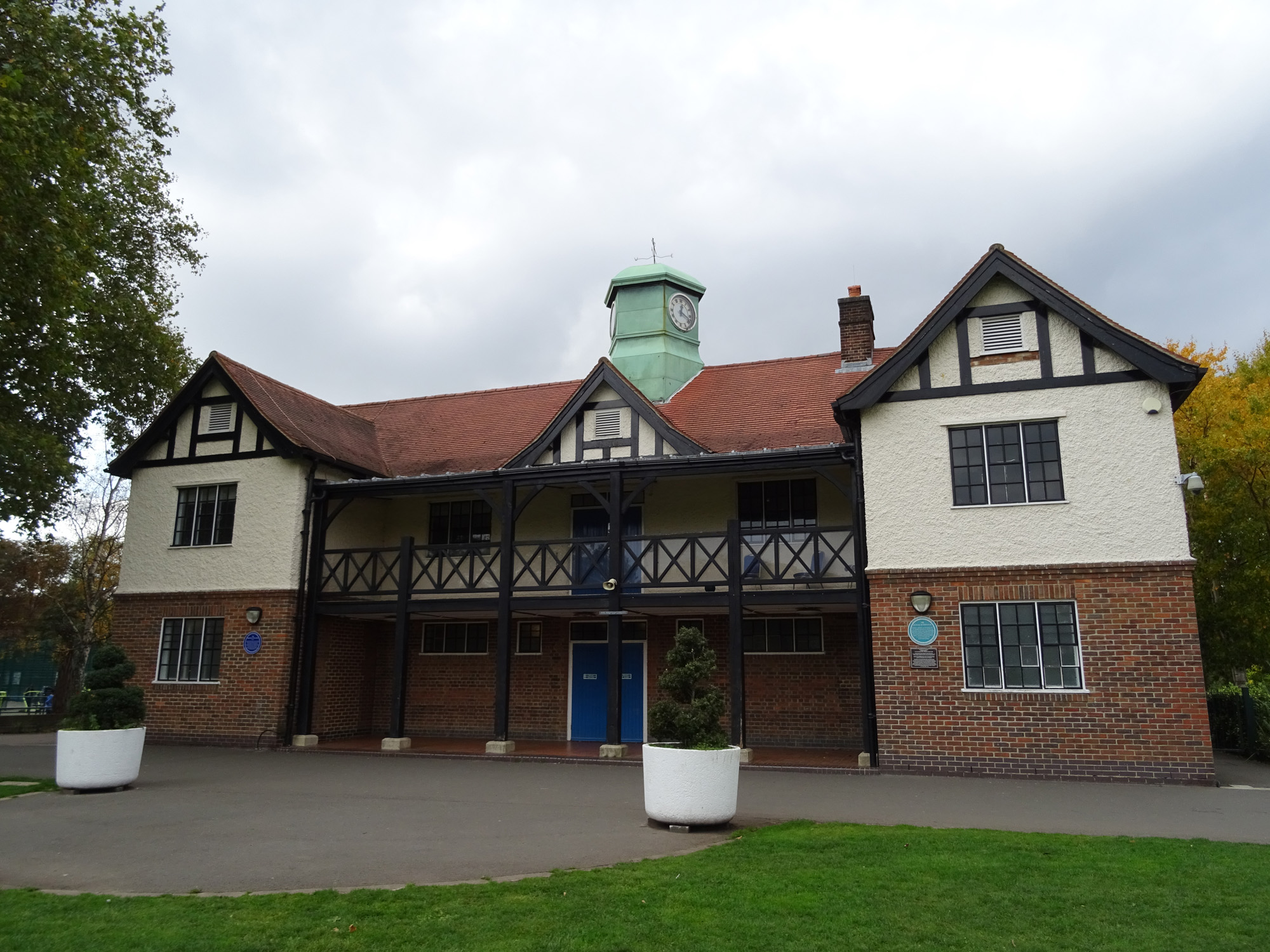
The Richard Beachcroft Pavilion

The area, largely as it is defined today, was first formally opened to the public in April 1888, when the pavilion, which still survives, was also opened. The park was originally conceived as a work creation scheme to alleviate the 1887–88 economic slump. Five hundred men were employed for ten weeks to drain, fence, and lay out the land. The park was an immediate success and crowds of 10,000 could be seen on Saturday afternoons.

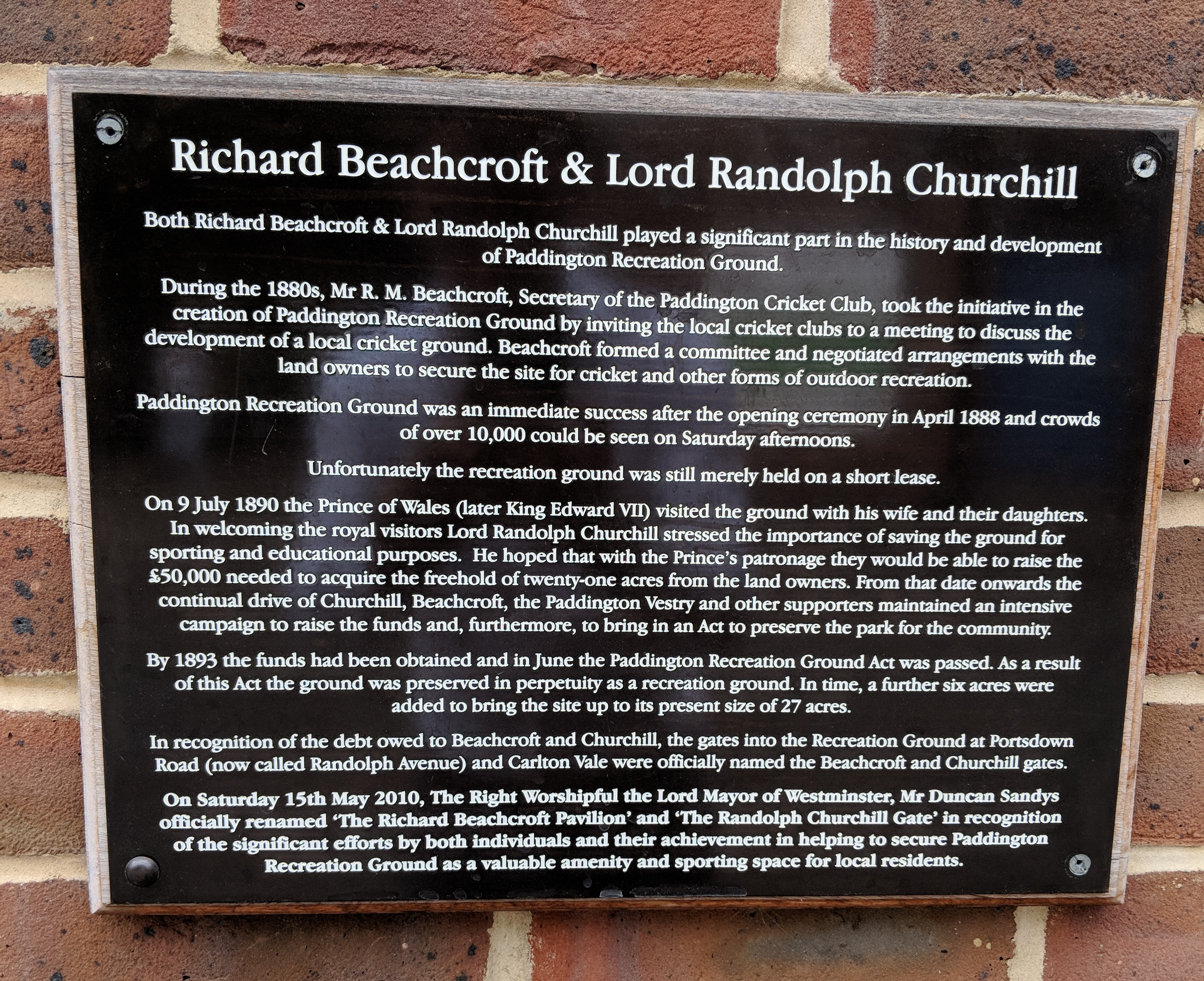
Commemorative plaque at the pavilion

A cinder cycle track was built in 1888; this was replaced in 1900 with a banked cycle track, with an additional running track installed inside it. These combined tracks, which were on the site of the current cricket pitch, were removed in 1987. The grass bank parallel to Grantully Road is now the only remaining evidence of the banked cycle track.

In its early years, the park was still only held on a short lease. On 9 July 1890, the Prince of Wales (later King Edward VII) visited the park with his wife and daughters. Lord Randolph Churchill, MP for Paddington South, who had been instrumental in establishing the park, lobbied the Prince to save the park for recreational and educational purposes. Over the ensuing years, with the Prince's patronage, they were able to raise the £50,000 needed to acquire the freehold.

The Paddington Recreation Act was passed by parliament in 1893, authorising the formal acquisition of lands in the Parish of Paddington to "provide the residents with a public recreational ground", and a charitable trust was established in 1896 under the name of the Paddington Recreation Ground, owned by London County Council. In time, a further six acres were acquired to bring the ground to its current size of 27 acres.

In 2006, Westminster City Council launched a £3.5 million regeneration programme, enabling extensive refurbishments to be carried out at the grounds to "meet changing community needs and environmental demands". Today, the Recreation Ground receives financial support and practical involvement from various sports organisations, including Sport England, the Football Foundation, the English Football Association, and the Lawn Tennis Association.

== Facilities ==
Included within the Recreation Ground are thirteen tennis courts, a 400m athletics track (refurbished in 2020), two artificial turf pitches, a "water-based" hockey pitch, a bowling green, cricket nets, children's play areas, a bandstand, picnic areas, an environmental area and several gardens.

At the centre of the park is a traditional 19th century pavilion overlooking a 'village green area' cricket pitch, around 100 metres (330 ft) in length, with an artificial cricket wicket. The pavilion houses a health and fitness centre operated by Everyone Active.

The park also has a café that sells drinks, food and ice cream.

== Sporting heritage ==
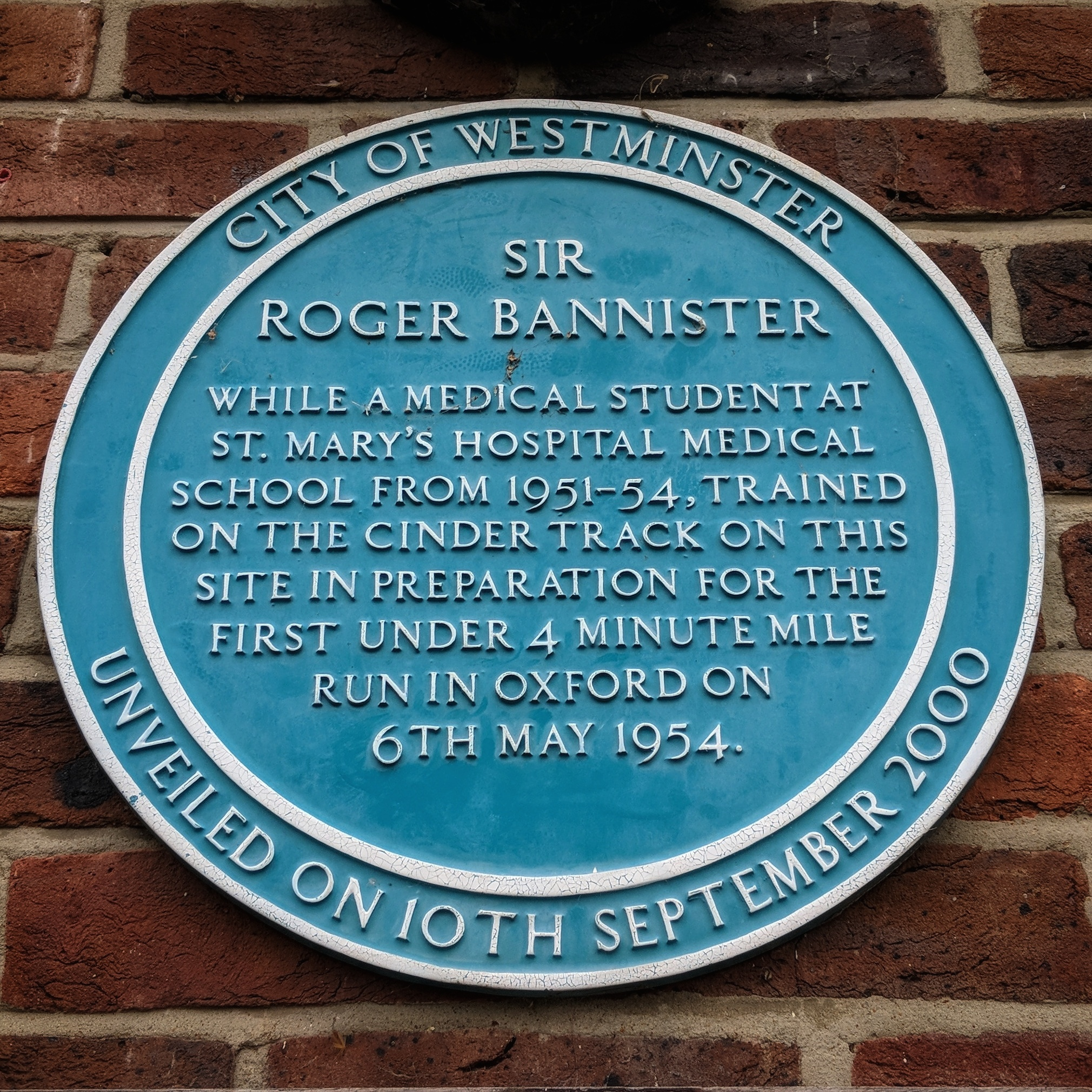
Sir Roger Bannister's blue plaque

Catford Cycling Club first held track races in the grounds in 1889, just one year after the park was opened to the public. It was reported in The Woolwich Gazette in 1892 that these races were attracting up to 7,000 spectators. The cycling club relocated their races to a purpose-built velodrome in 1894.

The original running track, which was removed in 1987 to make way for the new cricket pitch, was used by Roger Bannister in the early 1950s to train for the four minute mile attempt, while he was a medical student at the nearby St Mary's Hospital in Paddington. A blue plaque was unveiled at the pavilion in September 2000 to commemorate his achievement.

Another blue plaque at the pavilion honours the success of former professional racing cyclist Sir Bradley Wiggins, who learned to ride a bike in the park as a child while living in nearby Kilburn. His father, Australian professional cyclist Gary Wiggins, also trained at the grounds in his younger days, as did former British track cyclist Reg Harris before him.

The hockey pitch is home to Hampstead & Westminster Hockey Club, who enter teams in both the Men's and Women's England Hockey Leagues. Established in 1894, this is one of the largest adult hockey clubs in the UK.
