= Culliton =

Culliton is a surname. Notable people with the surname include:

- Brandon Culliton, Canadian film director
- Carolyn Culliton (née DeMoney), American daytime serial writer
- E. M. Culliton (1906–1991), member of Legislative Assembly of Saskatchewan, Chief Justice of Saskatchewan
- Lucy Culliton (born 1966), Australian artist
- Richard Culliton, American television writer

== See also ==
- Calton (disambiguation)
- Cleiton (disambiguation)
- Colton (disambiguation)
- Coulton (disambiguation)
