= Culton =

Culton may refer to:

== People ==
- Culton Scovia Nakamya (born 1993), Ugandan journalist
- Albert Culton, American basketball player (fl. 1970s–1980s)
- Jill Culton, American animator and director (fl. since 1993)
- Leslie Culton (born 1970), American wrestler with ring name Vanessa Harding

== Other meanings ==
- Alternative term for taxon in cultivated plant taxonomy
- Coylton, village in South Ayrshire, Scotland (Scots name: Culton)

== See also ==
- Calton (disambiguation)
- Colton (disambiguation)
