= Colton =

Colton may refer to:

== Places ==
=== Australia ===
- Colton, South Australia, a locality in the District Council of Elliston
- Electoral district of Colton, South Australia

=== England ===
- Colton, Cumbria
- Colton, Leeds (a village to the east of the city.)
- Colton, Norfolk (in Marlingford and Colton parish)
- Colton, North Yorkshire
- Colton, Staffordshire
- Colton, Suffolk (in Great Barton parish)

=== United States ===
- Colton, California
- Colton, Nebraska
- Colton, New York
  - Colton (CDP), New York
- Colton, Ohio
- Colton, Oregon
- Colton, South Dakota
- Colton, Utah, a ghost town
- Colton, Washington
- Colton Crater, Coconino County, Arizona
- Colton Hall California's Constitution Hall in Monterey

== People with the name ==
- Colton (given name)
- Colton (surname)

== Other uses ==
- Colton antigen system
- Marr and Colton, a pipe organ company

== See also ==
- Calton (disambiguation)
- Colston (disambiguation)
- Culton (disambiguation)
