= Carlton House (disambiguation) =

Carlton House may refer to:

in Australia

- Carlton House, Toowoomba in Queensland

in Canada

- Fort Carlton, near Saskatoon, Saskatchewan, Canada, formerly known as Carlton House

in England

- Carlton House, London
- Carlton House, Manchester
- Carlton House, Plympton

in the United States

- Carlton House (Lake Village, Arkansas), listed on the National Register of Historic Places (NRHP)
- Carlton House (United States Air Force Academy), NRHP-listed
- Albert Carlton Estate, Wauchula, Florida, NRHP-listed
- Jonathan Carlton House, Petersburg, Kentucky, listed on the NRHP in Kentucky
- Carlton-Frie-Tucker House, North Andover, Massachusetts, NRHP-listed
- Carlton House Block, Springfield, Massachusetts, NRHP-listed
- Carlton-Gladden House, Paris, Texas, listed on the NRHP in Texas
- Carlton (Falmouth, Virginia), listed on the NRHP in Virginia

Elsewhere

- Carlton House, Jamaica, a place on the List of National Heritage Sites in Jamaica
- Carlton House (horse), a thoroughbred racehorse owned by Queen Elizabeth II
- Medamulana Walawwa, also referred to as the Carlton House, Tangalle, the residence of former Sri Lankan President Mahinda Rajapaksa
