= Lauderdale Road =

Street in London, England

Coordinates: 51.52757°N 0.18636°W

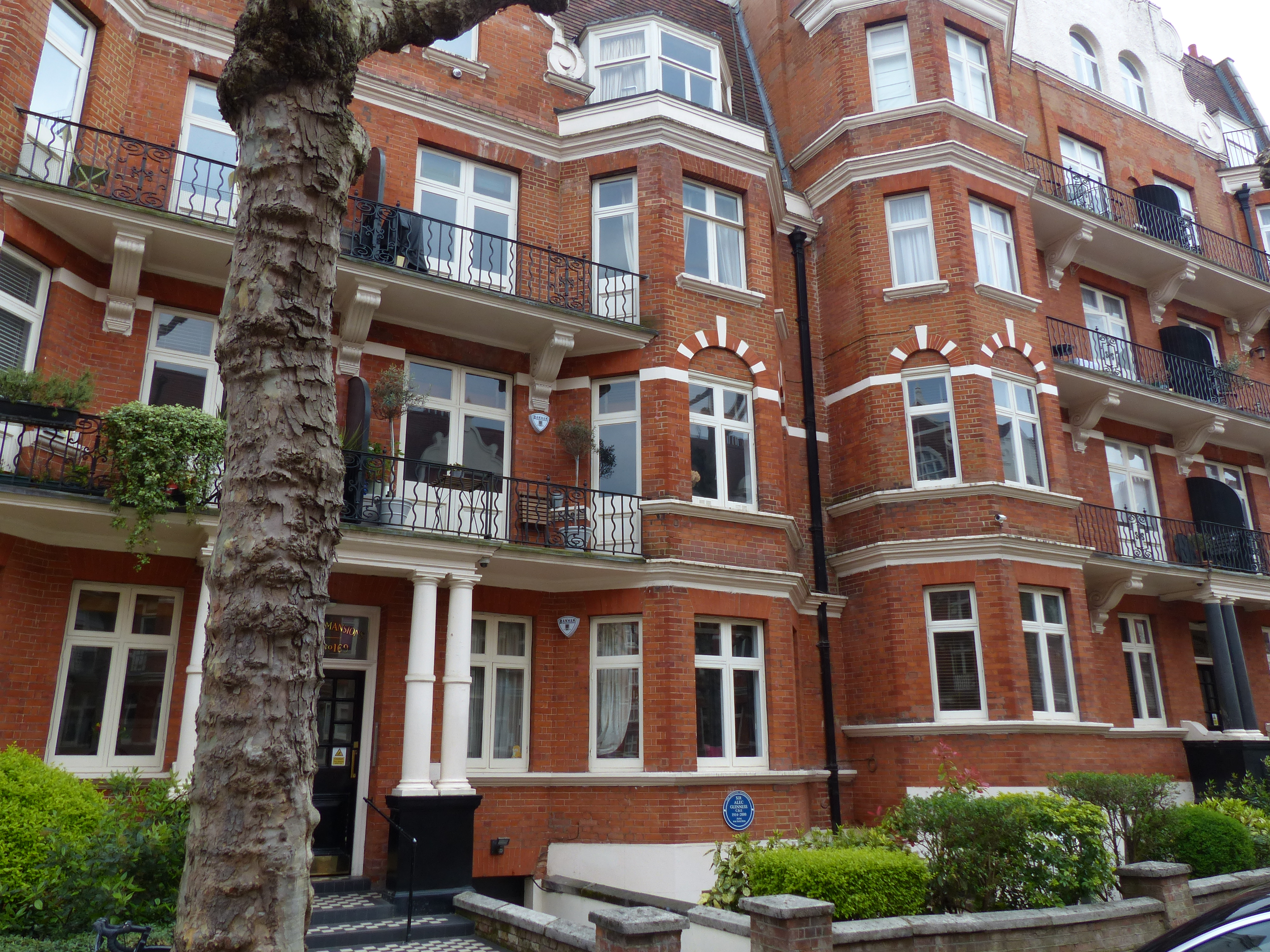
Lauderdale Mansions South with a blue plaque commemorating the birthplace of actor Alec Guinness.

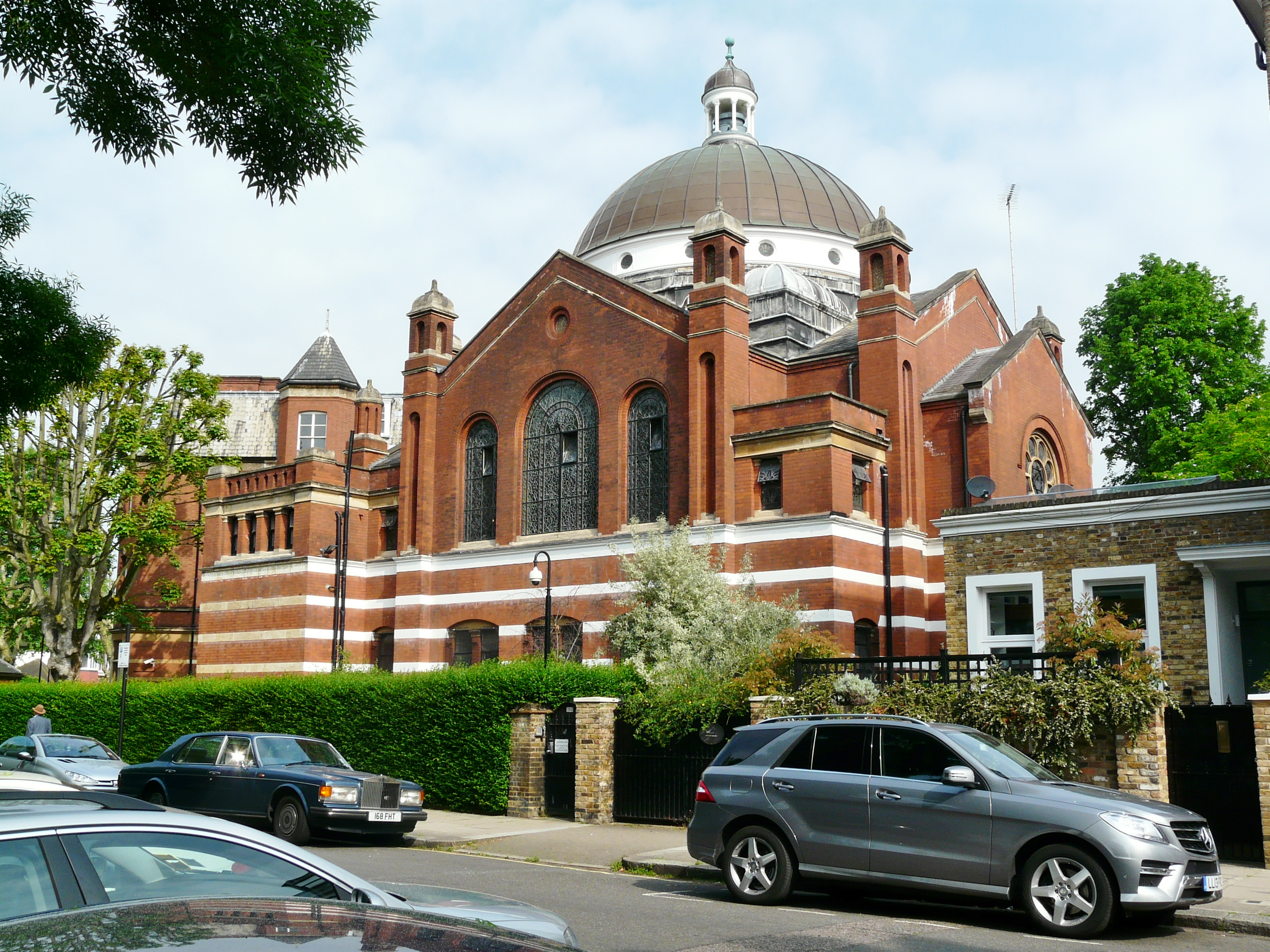
The Lauderdale Road Synagogue.

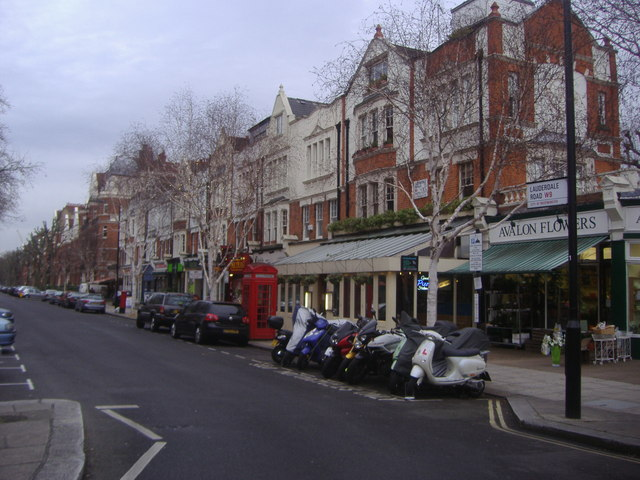
Shops in Lauderdale Road.

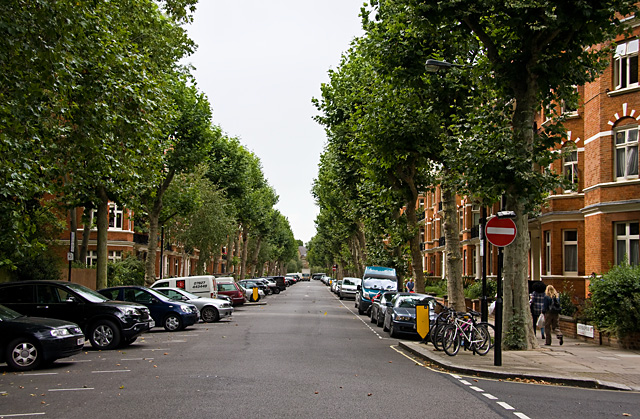

Lauderdale Road is a street in the Maida Vale district of London. Located in the City of Westminster, it runs north westwards from Sutherland Avenue to Elgin Avenue. Its southern end also meets Warrington Crescent and Randolph Avenue at a roundabout.

The street was built in 1875 and was named after a prominent Paddington resident the Earl of Lauderdale, an admiral in the Royal Navy. Built some time after the streets to the south of it were laid out, it was not until the late nineteenth century and the Edwardian era that the area was completed. It features large red brick mansion blocks with apartments, in contrast to the area further south which featured the white stucco terracing of the early-to-mid Victorian era. Typical of the style of the street, and surrounding area, is Lauderdale Mansions South. In 1896 the Lauderdale Road Synagogue was built in the street to serve the significant Jewish population in the area. It was constructed in the Neo-Byzantine style and is now Grade II listed.

Among notable former residents are actor Alec Guinness and musician Tony Meehan.

== Bibliography ==
- Bebbington, Gillian. London Street Names. Batsford, 1972.
- Cockburn, J. S., King, H. P. F. & McDonnell, K. G. T. & A History of the County of Middlesex. Institute of Historical Research, 1989.
- Cherry, Bridget & Pevsner, Nikolaus. London 3: North West. Yale University Press, 2002.
- Kolsky, Rachel & Rawson Roslyn. Jewish London, 3rd Edition: A Comprehensive Guidebook for Visitors and Londoners. Fox Chapel Publishing, 2018.
- Kushner, Tony. The Jewish Heritage in British History: Englishness and Jewishness. Routledge, 2012.
