= John Carleton =

John Carleton may refer to:

- John Carleton (rugby union) (born 1955), English rugby player
- Sir John Carleton, 1st Baronet (died 1637), MP
- John Carleton (skier) (1899–1977), American lawyer and skier
- John Aiken Carleton (1848–1934), member of the Salvation Army
- John of Carleton, Dean of Wells, 1351–1360

== See also ==
- Carleton (disambiguation)
