= Senator Perry =

Senator Perry may refer to:

- Benjamin Franklin Perry (1805–1886), South Carolina State Senate
- Carleton Perry (1931–2017), Wyoming State Senate
- Charles D. Perry (1907–1964), New York State Senate
- Charles Perry (Texas politician) (born 1962), Texas State Senate
- Gary Perry (fl. 2000s–2010s), Montana State Senate
- Jim Perry (politician) (born 1970s), North Carolina State Senate
- Joe Perry (politician) (fl. 1980s–2010s), Maine State Senate
- John C. Perry (1832–1884), New York State Senate
- John D. Perry (born 1935), New York State Senate
- John J. Perry (1811–1897), Maine State Senate
- John R. Perry (judge) (born 1954), Wyoming State Senate
- Jonathan Perry (politician) (born 1973), Louisiana State Senate
- Keith Perry (politician) (born 1958), Florida State Senate
- M. W. Perry (1864–1951), Wisconsin State Senate
- Rhoda Perry (born 1943), Rhode Island State Senate
- Ruth Perry (1939–2017), Liberian Senate
- Theodore Perry (1833–1921), Iowa State Senate
- William H. Perry (South Carolina politician) (1839–1902), South Carolina State Senate

== See also ==
- Mike Parry (politician) (born 1953), Minnesota State Senate
