= Carleton =

Carleton may refer to:

== Education establishments ==
- Carleton College, a liberal arts college in Northfield, Minnesota, United States
- Carleton School in Bradford, Massachusetts, United States
- Carleton University, a university in Ottawa, Ontario, Canada
- Ottawa-Carleton District School Board

== Human names ==
- Carleton (surname)
- Baron Carleton
- Carleton (given name)

== Places ==
=== Canada ===
==== Ontario ====
- Carleton (Ontario federal electoral district) (1867–1966, 2015–present)
- Carleton (Ontario provincial electoral district) (1867–1995, 2018–present)
- Carleton County, Ontario (historic)
- Carleton Place, Ontario
- West Carleton Township, Ontario
- Carleton Ward of Ottawa, AKA College Ward

==== New Brunswick ====
- Carleton, New Brunswick, now part of Saint John
- Carleton Parish, New Brunswick, in Kent County
- Carleton (New Brunswick federal electoral district) (1867–1914)
- Carleton (New Brunswick provincial electoral district, 1834–1974)
- Carleton (New Brunswick provincial electoral district, 1995–2014)
- Carleton (New Brunswick provincial electoral district) (1995–present)
- Mount Carleton
- Mount Carleton Provincial Park

==== Other provinces ====
- Carleton, Nova Scotia
- The Carleton, a building in Halifax, Nova Scotia
- Borden-Carleton, Prince Edward Island
- Carleton-sur-Mer, Québec

=== New Zealand ===
- Carleton, New Zealand, locality in the Waimakariri District

=== United Kingdom ===
- Carlton, Bedfordshire, previously spelled Carleton
- Carleton, West Cumbria, a village near Drigg, Cumbria
- Carleton, Penrith, a suburb of Penrith, Cumbria
- Carleton, St Cuthbert Without, a hamlet near Carlisle, England
- Carleton, Lancashire, near Blackpool
- East Carleton, Norfolk
- Carleton Forehoe, Norfolk
- Carleton Rode, Norfolk
- Carleton St Peter, Norfolk
- Carleton, North Yorkshire near Skipton
- Carleton, West Yorkshire, a small village on the outskirts of Pontefract

=== United States ===
- Carleton Island, in the St Lawrence River in upstate New York
- Carleton, Michigan
- Carleton, Nebraska

== Other ==
- Carleton Life Support, makers of scuba gear
- Carleton Ravens, the athletic teams that represent Carleton University in Ottawa
- Carleton's Raid, 1778 raid during the American War of Independence
- Carleton Corporation, defunct American software company

== See also ==
- Carlton (disambiguation)
