= Colston =

Colston may refer to:

== Places in the United Kingdom ==
- Colston, Glasgow
- Colston, Pembrokeshire
- Colston Bassett, Nottinghamshire
- Car Colston, Nottinghamshire

== Other uses ==
- Colston (name), a surname and given name (includes a list of people with the name)
- Colston-Ariston, a defunct English electrical appliance manufacturer
