= Lauderdale Mansions South =

Block of apartments in Maida Vale, City of Westminster

Coordinates: 51°31′38″N 0°11′15″W

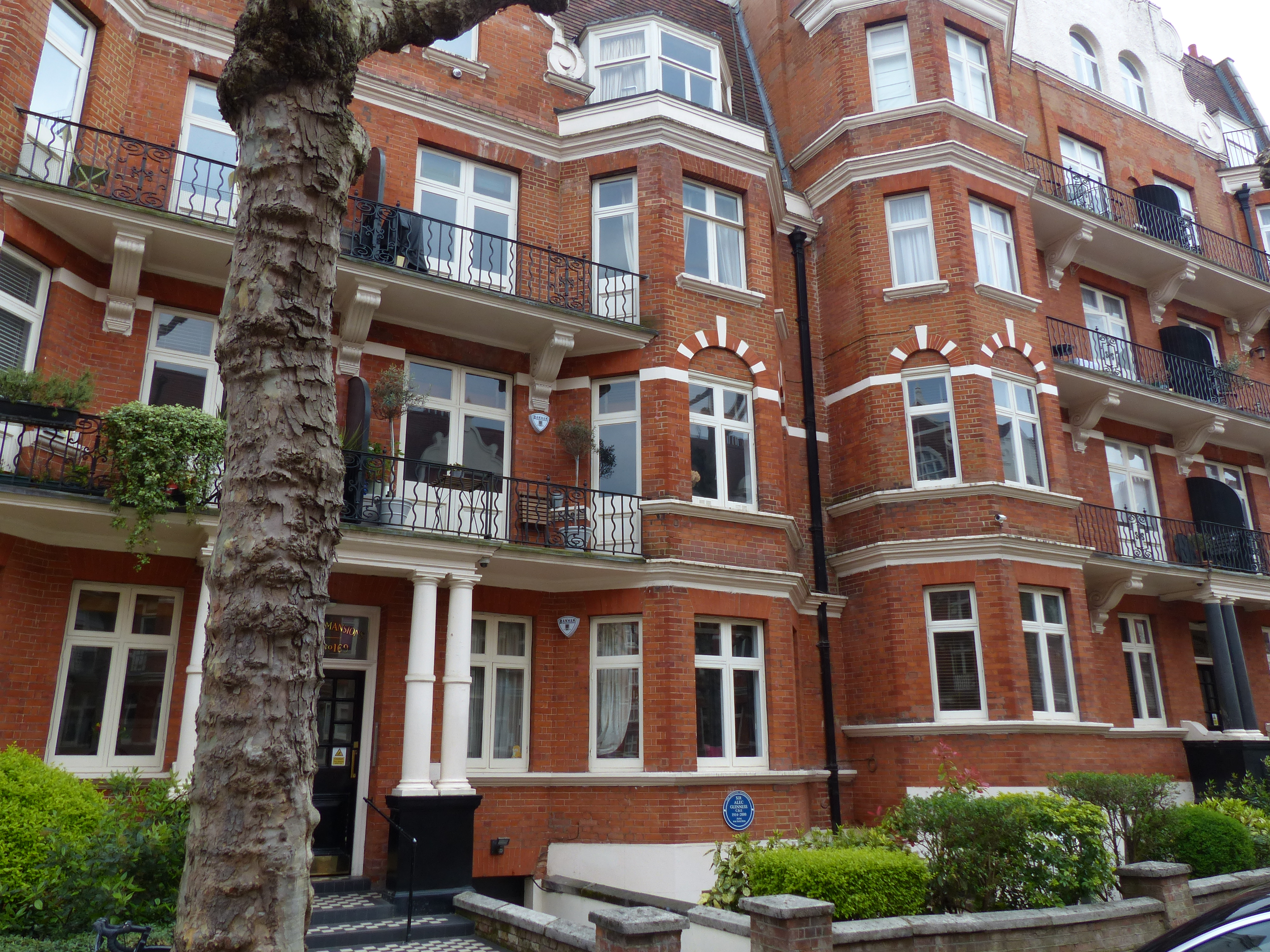
Lauderdale Mansions South with the exterior of the flat where the actor Sir Alec Guinness was born.

Lauderdale Mansions South is a block of 142 apartments in Lauderdale Road, Maida Vale, City of Westminster W9. Built in 1897, Lauderdale Mansions South was the first of a swathe of mansion flat buildings for the middle classes that spread across central Maida Vale in the 1897–1907 period.

The building's freehold company (in which all flat owners have a share) is unusual in that it is believed to be the only one in the UK whose constitution specifies a ‘first-past-the-post’ secret ballot for electing directors, with any shareholder being entitled to stand for election.

Lauderdale Mansions South is divided into 15 blocks, each with its own entrance hall leading to 8–14 flats. Behind the building lies a 1.5-acre (6,100 m^{2}) communal garden in which there is also a meeting room for residents housed in a former Boiler House. The basement areas include storage units and bicycle storage areas.

Most apartments in the building are 950 to 1,500 square feet (140 m^{2}). The upper floor flats have balconies overlooking Lauderdale Road, while lower ground floor flats back on to the communal garden.

For most of the 20th century the freehold of Lauderdale Mansions South was owned by the Church Commissioners, the property investment arm of the Church of England. But in 1989 the freehold was sold to the flat owners.

The freehold company is Manyplans Ltd, a subsidiary of Lauderdale Mansions (South) Ltd. The articles of association are also unusual for companies of this type in that they specify that board meetings should be open to shareholder observers, and that board minutes should be made available to shareholders.

Sir Alec Guinness, whose best-known screen roles included playing eight different characters in Kind Hearts and Coronets, Colonel Nicholson in The Bridge on the River Kwai and Obi-Wan Kenobi in the original Star Wars trilogy, was born in a ground-floor flat in the building on 2 April 1914.

More recent former residents of Lauderdale Mansions South have included Kathryn Flett, Observer TV critic and star of the BBC’s Grumpy Old Women series, and Mary McCartney, celebrity photographer and daughter of Paul and Linda McCartney.

In 2009, Lauderdale Mansions South was featured in Channel 4 television's The Home Show.
