= Sutherland Avenue =

Street in London, England

Coordinates: 51.52539°N 0.18813°W

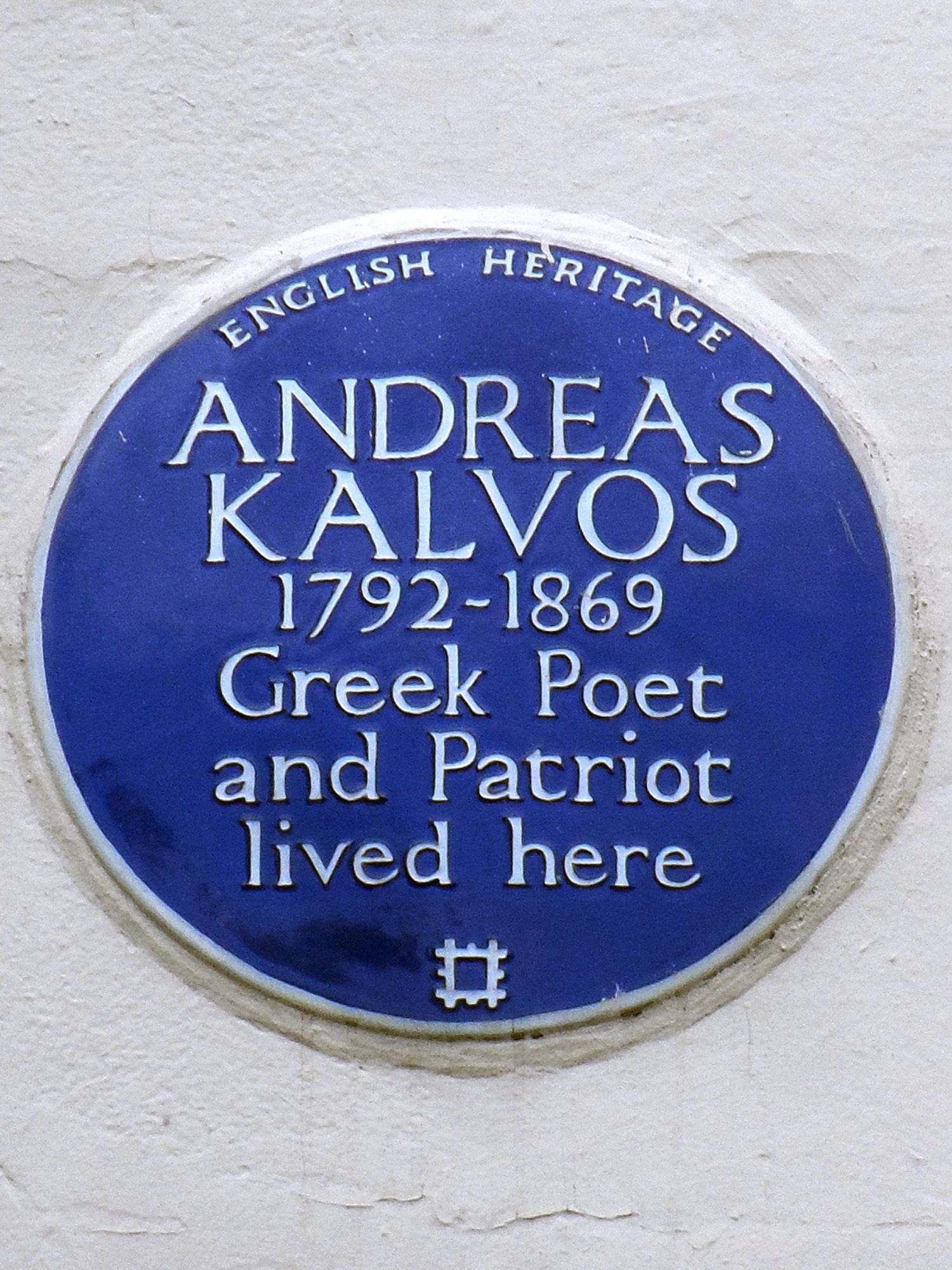
Blue plaque for the Greek writer Andreas Kalvos.

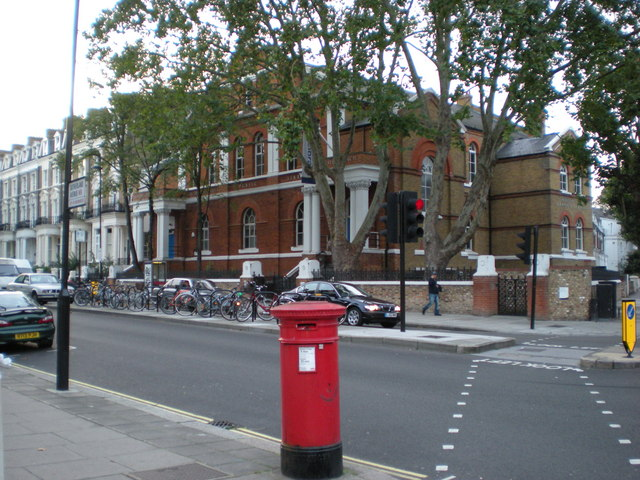
Maida Vale library

Sutherland Avenue is a street in Maida Vale, located in the City of Westminster on the northern edge of Little Venice. It is an avenue running east to west from the Edgware Road to Harrow Road. Along the route it is crossed or joined by Randolph Avenue, Warrington Crescent, Lauderdale Road, Castellain Road, Warwick Avenue and Shirland Road. Elgin Avenue runs directly parallel to the north.

In common with much of the area, the street design was laid out by the architect George Gutch in the Regency era and built during the following decades. The builder Hugh Biers played a role in developing the new wealthy residential street. Originally, it was two distinct roads, Stranraer Place and Sutherland Gardens, which were combined in 1887 to create the single Sutherland Avenue.

Like much of the surrounding area, it had a considerable Jewish population by the late Victorian era, which was served by the synagogue in neighbouring Lauderdale Road from 1896. The Greek poet Andreas Kalvos lived in the street in the nineteenth century, and is now commemorated by an English Heritage blue plaque; the film director Val Guest was born in the street; and the poet Eddie Linden published the poetry magazine Aquarius from his flat there.

Maida Vale library is on Sutherland Avenue.

== Bibliography ==
- Bebbington, Gillian. London Street Names. Batsford, 1972.
- Cockburn, J. S., King, H. P. F. & McDonnell, K. G. T. & A History of the County of Middlesex. Institute of Historical Research, 1989.
- Cherry, Bridget & Pevsner, Nikolaus. London 3: North West. Yale University Press, 2002.
- Goldman, Lawrence (ed.) Oxford Dictionary of National Biography 2005-2008. OUP Oxford, 2013.
- Hibbert, Christopher Weinreb, Ben, Keay, John & Keay, Julia. The London Encyclopaedia. Pan Macmillan, 2011.
