= Calton =

Calton may refer to:

== Places ==
- Calton, Argyll and Bute, a location in Scotland
- Calton, Glasgow, Scotland
  - Calton (ward), an electoral ward of the Glasgow City Council
- Calton, North Yorkshire, England
- Calton, Ontario, Canada
- Calton, Staffordshire, England
- Calton Hill, Edinburgh, Scotland

== People ==
- Patsy Calton, British politician
- Calton Coffie, Jamaican vocalist
- Calton Younger, Australian airman and author

== See also ==
- Carlton (disambiguation)
- Colton (disambiguation)
- Culton (disambiguation)
