= Eliza Anne Leslie-Melville =

English painter

- Born: Eliza Anne Smallbone; March 17, 1829; Brighton, Sussex, England
- Died: 1919-07-01; Brentford, Middlesex, England
- Resting place: Highgate Cemetery
- Known for: Painting
- Notable work: Portrait of Queen Victoria (1909 gift to RUSI)
- Movement: Genre art, portraiture
- Spouse: Alexander Melville (m. 1855; died 1892)

Eliza Anne Leslie-Melville, or Melville, (nee Smallbone; 17 March 1829 - July 1919) was a British painter in oils of genre and portraits. She became known as a painter in 1854 and continued to paint until 1900. She is celebrated for her portrait Queen Victoria.

== Life ==
Eliza Anne Melville, or Leslie-Melville, (née Smallbone) was born on 17 March 1829 in Brighton, Sussex, England. She was daughter to James Smallbone and Frances Barrow.

She married Alexander Melville, a painter, in 1855. During the years 1864-1874 they lived at No.34 Fitsroy Square, London. In 1890 they returned to Fitsroy Square, No. 6, where they lived until her husband died in 1892. After the death of her husband she moved to 49 Portsdown Road, Paddington and began to use the name Leslie-Melville. They had three daughters. Two of which became painters.

She wrote a book, $2000 Reward, which was published in 1871. By this time her husband had become deaf.

Mrs. Alexander Melville, who enjoys some considerable reputation as a painter, has brought out for this holiday season a children's book - Lloyd's Weekly Newspaper

She wrote in the preface why, as an artist, she ventures ‘to appear before the public as an authoress’. Her book was inspired by a young boy she noticed while walking on the street. She approached his mother and the rest of his family who ‘from the character of the whole,’ it occurred to her ‘would make a good subject for a picture’. She asked the mother to bring her children and visit her. The mother and her children visited and Melville was ‘more than ever pleased with the romantic little boy’ who subsequently often sat for her. Melville became ‘much attached’ to her ‘little friend’ who later fell ill and, with Melville at his bedside, died. The story written in the book was adjusted to give a happier ending.

At the end of the book Melville invited readers who may be interested in art to visit her studio in Fitsroy Square. She advertised she was ‘very successful in painting posthumous portraits’. This advert is followed by several pages of press reviews relating to her paintings, illustrations and portraits.

She died, aged 90, in Brentford and was buried on 29 July 1919 on the western side of Highgate Cemetery.

== Career ==
She was an oil painter of genre and portraits. She became known as a painter in 1854 and continued to paint until 1900. One of her most celebrated works is a portrait, Queen Victoria, which she gifted to the Royal United Services Institute, "RUSI", in 1909. It is one of three paintings by women in the RUSI collection.

This portrait of Queen Victoria is important because of her [Queen Victoria's] patronage and because it’s painted by a woman. – Jacqui Grainger, RUSI

She exhibited in the principal galleries during the years 1854–1868. At first, 1854–1855, her speciality was landscapes and she exhibited at the Royal Academy, the Society of British Artists and twice at the British Institution under the name Smallbone. She then continued to exhibit at the Royal Academy until 1868 under the name Melville.

During the mid-1860s, Melville and her husband jointly painted ‘one of the largest works ever’: Presentation of the Freedom of the City to the Prince of Wales. A piece depicting Albert Edward, Prince of Wales taking up the Freedom of the City of London, on 8 June 1863. In 1866 The Morning Post reported that the painting was ‘progressing rapidly under the hands of the skilful artists, Mr. and Mrs. Alexander Melville, who are now daily engaged on the work at Guildhall.’ When completed, The Morning Post reported the painting had "been viewed and very greatly admired by the Queen", and "her Majesty the Queen of Prussia" and had "been taken to Windsor Castle". The painting embodied more than 450 portraits and took five years to complete. It was exhibited publicly in July 1868. However, the Corporation of London declined to purchase it and awarded 300 guineas as recompense. In 1872 the Melvilles commenced proceedings to recover £4,950 for the picture. The following year the case of Melville v. Corporation of London went to court. The Melvilles were unsuccessful. It was ruled there was no contract between the parties.

In 1870 she was noted as ‘a lady artist of rising celebrity’. She held an exhibition at her home of paintings and illustrative passages of Scripture relating to the Spiritual World. The Exmouth Journal noted "They merit public notice on account of the originality of conception."

Despite the previous lawsuit her association with royalty continued. In 1877 several works that were exhibited by command to the Queen at Windsor Castle were ‘on view at Mr. and Mrs. Alexander Melville Art Exhibition’ at Portman Square. And in 1880 she ‘had the honour of submitting to Her Majesty's inspection at Windsor Castle a picture painted by her’.

In 1885 an exhibit of ‘Pictures by Alexander Melville and Eliza A. Melville’, a collection of studies and paintings, was held at the recently opened McQueen's Gallery, Tottenham Court Road. In the same year Melville, whose works were 'not unknown in Alnwick’, showed, together with works by her husband, at an exhibition in Alnwick, Northumberland.

== Collections ==
- Beecroft Art Gallery
- National Army Museum
- Bushey Museum and Art Gallery
- The Royal United Services Institute for Defence and Security Studies
