= Carlton Hill =

Carlton Hill may refer to:

- Carlton Hill, Brighton, an inner-city area of the English coastal city of Brighton and Hove
- Carlton Hill, New Jersey, United States, an unincorporated community in Rutherford/Wallington, Bergen County and former Erie Railroad train station that served these two towns
- Carlton Hill Wildlife Management Area, in Middlebury, New York, United States
- Calton Hill, a hill in Edinburgh, Scotland and site of the National Monument and Nelson's Monument
- Carlton Hill, London, a street in London, England
- Carlton Hill Station, a pastoral lease in the Kimberley region of Western Australia
