= Calton, Ontario =

Hamlet in Malahide, Ontario, Canada

Coordinates: 42°42′41″N 80°51′34″W

Calton, Ontario is a hamlet within the township of Malahide in Elgin County, Ontario, Canada.
