= Carleton Ellis =

American chemist and inventor

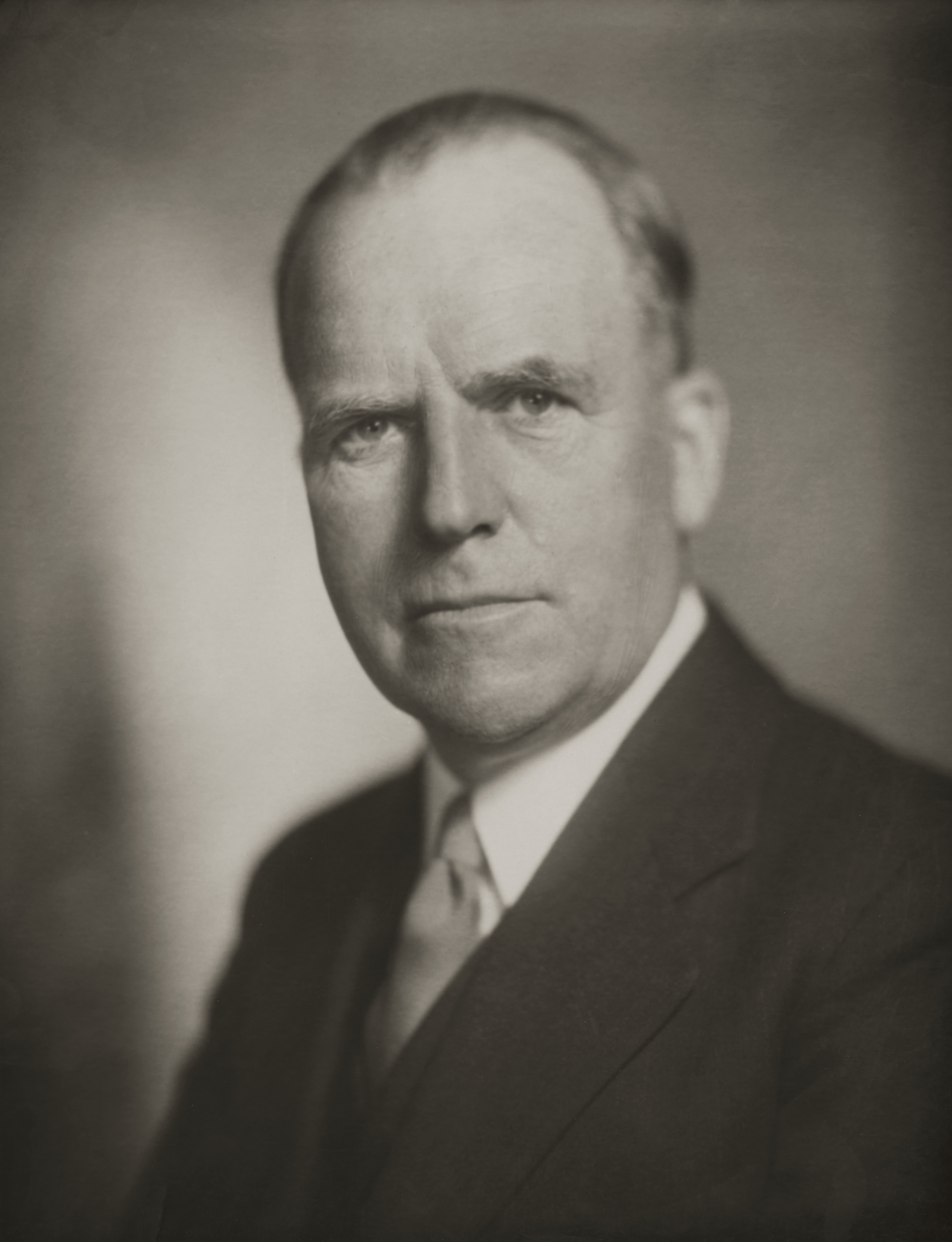
Ellis c. 1938

Carleton Ellis (September 20, 1876 – January 13, 1941) was an American inventor and a pioneer in the field of organic chemistry. He was involved in the development of margarine, polyester, anti-knock gasoline, paint and varnish remover, and holder of 753 patents. A native of Keene, New Hampshire, he was the valedictorian of his high school class, and later a graduate of MIT. He then set up the Ellis Laboratories in Montclair, New Jersey.

== Contributions ==
Ellis's contributions were in the improvement of existing technology. He developed gasoline that reduced engine knock, longer lasting housepaint, more durable polyesters and plastics, improved printing inks, methods for flameless combustion, methods for hydroponics for plant growth without soil, and a healthier and more palatable version of margarine. Prior to 1913, there were substitutes for butter that had been made from animal fats that had high grease content and was often hard to digest. Ellis found a way to synthesize margarine from vegetable oils, and it is said that he helped create what is now a multi-billion dollar industry.

Ellis was the author of "The Hydrogenation of Oils" in Journal of the Society of Chemical Industry (1912) and a 1920 book of the same name.

== Highlights ==
In 1933, he was issued the first American patent (USP 1897977) for an unsaturated polyester, followed by a patent for polyester co-polymers in the year before his death (USP 2195362). Ellis died of influenza at the age of 64, while vacationing at Miami Beach. A merchant marine tanker, the Liberty ship S.S. Carleton Ellis, was later named in his honor during World War II. Time magazine eulogized him by writing, "Chemist Ellis' inventions gave birth to more than 100,000 compounds. He developed Standard Oil's tube-&-tank process of cracking oil, found the formula for cheap acetone to fireproof airplane wings in World War I, and made plastics an exact and lucrative science."

He was awarded the Edward Longstreth Medal in 1916. He was inducted into the Plastics Hall of Fame in 1974.

== Publications ==
- The Hydrogenation of Oils, Catalyzers and Catalysis, and the Generation of Hydrogen and Oxygen (Scientific Books, 1915)
- Synthetic Resins and Their Plastics (Chemical Catalog Company, 1923)
- The Chemical Action of Ultraviolet Rays (Chemical Catalog Company, 1925)
- The Hydrogenation of Organic Substances (Van Nostrand, 1930)
- The Chemistry of Petroleum Derivatives (Chemical Catalog Company 1934)
- The Chemistry of Synthetic Resins (Reinhold, 1935)
- Printing Inks: Their Chemistry (Reinhold, 1940)
- (with Joseph V. Meigs) Gasoline and Other Motor Fuels(Van Nostrand, 1921)
- (with Miller W. Swaney) Soilless Growth of Plants (Reinhold, 1939)
- (with Herbert R. Simonds) Handbook of Plastics (Van Nostrand, 1943)
