= Colston, Pembrokeshire =

Coordinates: 51.915°N 4.929°W

Colston
- Location within Pembrokeshire
- OS grid reference: SM9828
- Community: Puncheston
- Principal area: Pembrokeshire
- Country: Wales
- Sovereign state: United Kingdom
- Post town: Haverfordwest
- Postcode district: SA62
- Dialling code: 01348
- Police: Dyfed-Powys
- Fire: Mid and West Wales
- Ambulance: Welsh
- UK Parliament: Preseli Pembrokeshire
- Senedd Cymru – Welsh Parliament: Preseli Pembrokeshire

Colston is a hamlet in the community of Puncheston in Pembrokeshire, Wales.

The hamlet is the site of a Neolithic chambered tomb, known as The Altar. The tomb consists of a capstone, 2m by 2m by 0.6m, resting on two upright stones and set on a probable barrow, 30m in diameter.
