= John Aiken Carleton =

Commissioner John Aiken Carleton (21 May 1848 – 21 June 1934) was a contemporary of William Booth and played a significant role in the early days of The Salvation Army. He was the first Chair of the Salvation Army International Musical Board. He is known for his idea of giving up pudding that gave rise to Self-Denial week, something still in existence to this day. He was in the first cohort to be awarded the Order of the Founder in 1920.

== Salvation Army Music ==
Carleton was a capable musician and served as a songster leader at Penge for 28 years. William Booth sought to centralize and control the creativity and compositions of the Salvation Army brass band, which were quickly becoming synonymous with the movement. He formed an International Musical Board (later called International Headquarters Music Board) and appointed Carleton as the first chair. The Board served to standardize and censor the music of the Salvation Army, much to the frustration of and criticism by Richard Slater, who commanded the Musical Department.

Carleton recognized the need for a brass repair shop to service the instruments of the almost 400 bands that existed by the late 1880s. Under the supervision of the Trade Department, which Carleton was part of, a repair shop was opened in the basement of the Salvation Army International Headquarters in 1889 in Southwark Street but was quickly relocated in 1890 to Clerkenwell Road, London. By 1893 the Salvation Army was making their own instruments. As their production expanded, they relocated to Fortress Road, London in 1896 and then opened a factory in St Albans in 1901. In 1972 the factory was bought by Boosey & Hawkes.

== Salvation Army Self Denial Week ==
In August, 1886, William Booth delivered a challenge at London’s Exeter Hall, encouraging support so that the Salvation Army could expand its ministries around the world. Carleton could not match the pledges of the wealthier citizens in the audiences. He pledged to give up pudding instead, he wrote, “By going without pudding every day for a year, I calculate I can save 50 shillings. This I will do, and will remit the amount named as quickly as possible.

William Booth read Carleton’s pledge to the congregation, “There is an idea here," he remarked. "While we ought not to ask our people to do without pudding for a whole year, I see no reason why we should not ask them to unite in going without something every day for a week and to give the proceeds to help on the work."

William Booth adapted Carleton’s idea and started a Self-Denial Week, which continues to be an annual event in the Salvation Army around the world.
