= Carleton Powell =

American judge

Carleton D. Powell (born 1939 in South Carolina) was a special trial judge of the United States Tax Court.

== Education ==
Powell attended the Kent School in Kent, Connecticut, graduating in 1957. He received a B.A. degree from the University of Virginia in 1961 and his LL.B. from the University of Richmond in 1967.

== Career ==
Powell served as a commissioned officer in the United States Army between 1962 and 1964. From 1967 to 1970, he was employed in various positions by the Internal Revenue Service. In 1970 he became a Trial Attorney in the Appellate Section of the United States Department of Justice Tax Division; in 1977, he was promoted to a Senior Trial Attorney. Between 1980 and 1985, Powell was a Reviewer. He was appointed as a Special Trial Judge of the U.S. Tax Court on August 25, 1985.
