= Carleton Tufnell =

English cricketer

Carleton Fowell Tufnell (20 February 1856 – 26 May 1940) was an English cricketer.

Born in Northfleet, Tufnell attended Eton College, where he failed to make an appearance for the school's cricket eleven. A medium pace bowler and useful batsman, Tufnell played in eight first-class matches for Kent County Cricket Club, taking 15 wickets and scoring 108 runs.

He moved to India following the 1879 English cricket season, with false reports of his death in Simla reaching England in 1884.

== Bibliography ==
- Carlaw, Derek (2020). Kent County Cricketers, A to Z: Part One (1806–1914) (PDF). Cardiff: ACS.
