= Colton, Nebraska =

Unincorporated community in Nebraska, United States

- Unincorporated community
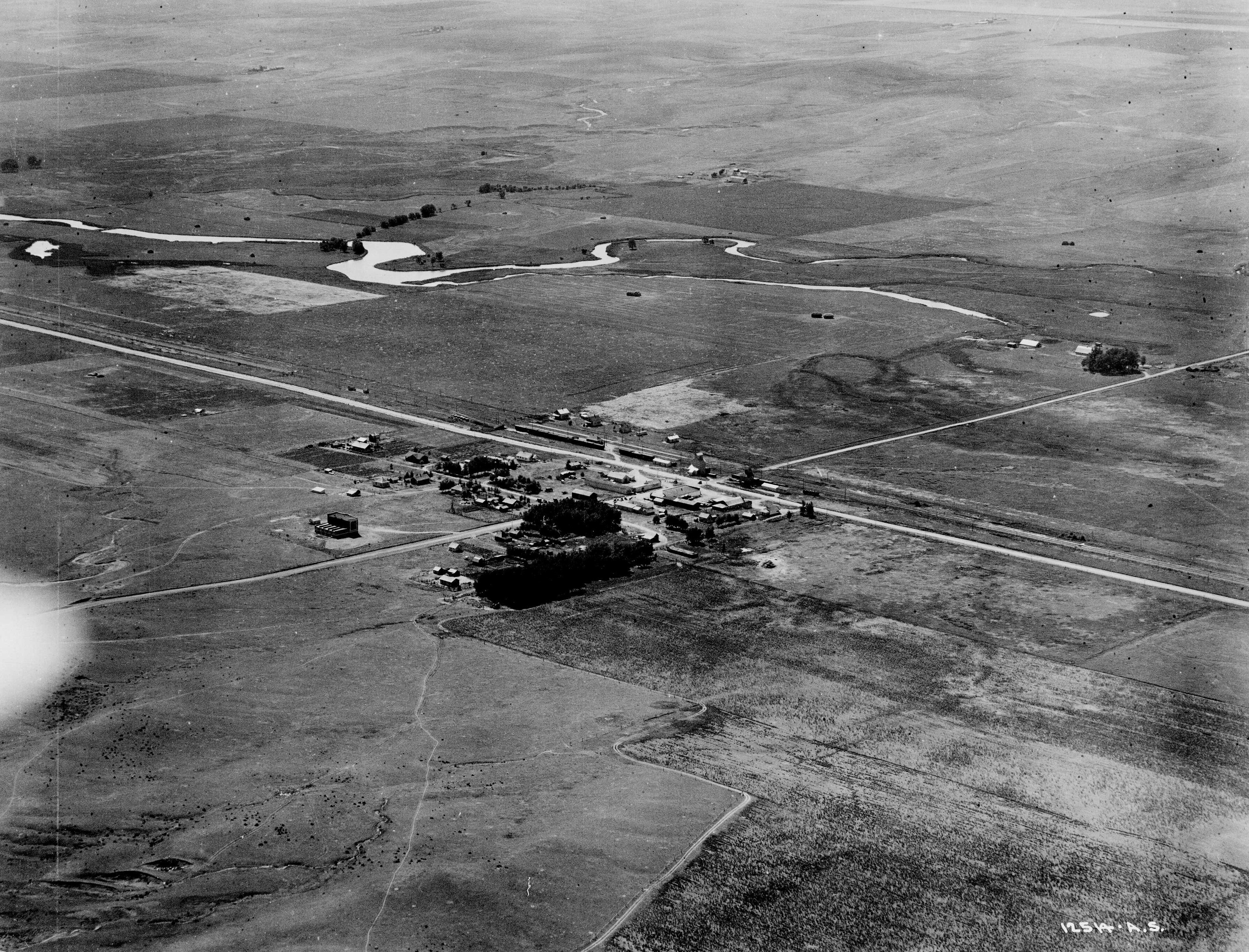
- Aerial view of Colton in 1925

- Location within Nebraska Location within the United States
- Coordinates: 41.2°N 102.9°W
- Country: United States
- State: Nebraska
- County: Cheyenne

Colton is an unincorporated community in Cheyenne County, Nebraska, United States.

== History ==
A post office was established at Colton in 1887, and remained in operation until it was discontinued in 1901. Colton was named for Francis Colton, a Union Pacific Railroad ticket agent.
