= Alex Carleton =

American fashion designer

- Born: Orleans, Massachusetts, U.S.
- Education: Cambridge School of Weston; Sarah Lawrence College
- Occupation: Fashion designer
- Known for: Founder of Rogues Gallery; Creative director of L.L.Bean Signature; Creative director of Filson

Alex Carleton is an American fashion and home-goods designer. He is the founder of Rogues Gallery and was the creative director of an L.L.Bean capsule brand, L.L.Bean Signature. He is currently creative director of Filson.

== Early life ==
Carleton grew up on Cape Cod and attended the Cambridge School in Weston, Massachusetts, as well as Sarah Lawrence College.

== Career ==
After working for a short time in a Boston furniture repair shop, Carleton began his design career in New York at Polo Ralph Lauren where he was a senior designer. He did design and branding for Abercrombie & Fitch. He moved to Maine in 1999.

Carleton started Rogues Gallery in 2003 as a side project while he was working for L.L.Bean. Rogues Gallery's T-shirts pioneered the trend toward highly designed graphic T-shirts and were quickly noted in the pages of Men's Vogue and eventually on a number of celebrity clients. The Rogues Gallery store and website have since been closed.

Carleton was nominated for GQ designer of the year in 2009. That same year he began working on developing the new L.L.Bean Signature line. He subsequently opened a small boutique art and antiques gallery on Cape Cod called Foc'sle. His arrangement with L.L.Bean ended in 2013, and, soon after, he moved to Filson.
