= Carleton O'Brien =

Carleton O'Brien (1903 Providence, Rhode Island – May 1952) was an organized crime figure involved in bookkeeping and policy operations in Rhode Island. Formerly listed as Public Enemy No. 1 by state officials, O'Brien was one of the last independent racketeers as the Patriarca crime family began establishing themselves in Providence. He was also an associate of bank robber Joseph "Specs" O'Keefe and was involved in the planning of the Great Brinks Robbery during the early 1950s.

On the evening of May 1952, after returning from a local roadhouse, his body was found in the backyard of his Cranston home (although other accounts claim he was gunned down during the afternoon in a street in Pawtucket) after being shot and killed by an unidentified gunman.
