= Culton Scovia Nakamya =

Ugandan journalist

- Born: 1993 (age 32–33)
- Citizenship: Uganda
- Education: Makerere Institute for Social Development, Uganda Film and Television Institute, Balibaseka Secondary School, St Andrews Primary School, St Pius Naddangira Primary School
- Occupation: Journalist
- Known for: Advocate for press freedom
- Awards: Chevening Award Scholarship 2024, Urbanisation and Human Settlements Reporting Award 2024, Inspiring Female Journalist prize 2023

Culton Scovia Nakamya (born 1993) is a TV Journalist, an advocate for press freedom and founder "Her Story Uganda". She worked with BBS Terefayina (TV) until 2024. She served as the correspondent of NTV Uganda based in Luweero District. She is the second-to-last born of seven children.

== Early life and education ==
Nakamya is currently studying a MSc in Gender, Media and Culture the London School of Economics and Political Science funded by the Chevening scholarship in the 2024–2025 cohort. She went to Makerere Institute for Social Development, Uganda Film and Television Institute, Balibaseka Secondary School, St. Andrews Primary School, and St. Pius Naddangira Primary School.

She presented a school report before the then Vice President Gilbert Bukenya which was aired on UTV (Uganda Broadcasting Corporation now) while in her primary six. She started her journalism journey at Kiwok- based community radio as an Internee in 2013.

== Career ==
She worked with BBS Terefayina (TV) until 2024, served as the correspondent of NTV Uganda based in Luweero District. She is a founder of "Her Story Uganda", a communications consultant and digital security trainer. She was arrested during the 2021 general elections while on duty covering presidential candidate Robert Kyagulanyi alias Bobi Wine in Kalangala District.

== Personal life ==
She enjoys videography, radio production and piggery. She likes eating rice and pork.

== Awards and recognitions ==
- She won a Chevening Award Scholarship to UK in 2024.
- She won the Urbanisation and Human Settlements Reporting 2024.
- She won the 2023 Inspiring Female Journalist prizefromy the African Center for Media Excellence.
- Awarded by the Rotaract Club of Lubaga in 2023.
- She was honored by the Department of Journalism of YMCA Buwambo Campus.
