= Marie-Helene Carleton =

American photographer, writer and filmmaker

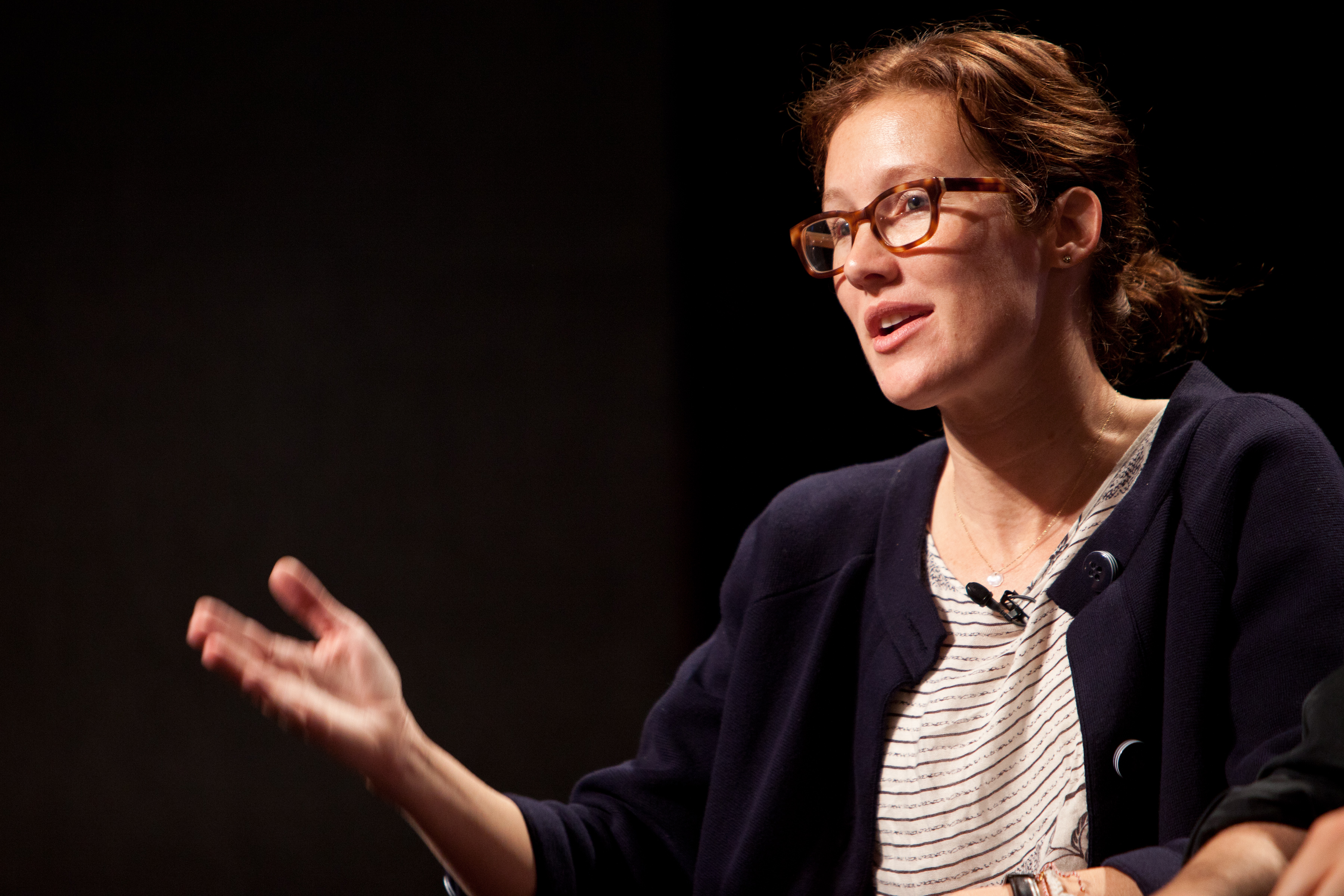
Marie-Helene Carleton, 2011

Marie-Hélène Carleton is a writer, photographer, model, and documentary filmmaker, based out of New York City.

== Education ==
Carleton is an alumna of the University of North Carolina at Chapel Hill and of the Johns Hopkins School of Advanced International Relations, where she received an MA degree.

== Career ==
Her writing and photographs have also appeared in the book The Looting of the Iraq Museum, Baghdad, published by Abrams in 2004, and her photography has appeared in the book Water Culture, published by Trolley in 2003.

Her photographs documenting the September 11 attacks are included in the collection of the Museum of Fine Arts Houston.

=== American Hostage ===
Carleton is the co-author, with Micah Garen, of American Hostage, published in October 2005 by Simon & Schuster. The book is a memoir of working in Iraq as a filmmaker and reporter, and Micah’s subsequent kidnapping, and her involvement, with many others, to help bring about his release.
