= Carlton House (United States Air Force Academy) =

Historic house in Colorado, United States

- U.S. National Register of Historic Places
- Colorado State Register of Historic Properties No. 5EP.1222
- Location within Colorado Location within the United States
- Location: United States Air Force Academy, Colorado Springs, Colorado
- Coordinates: 38°57′58″N 104°51′2″W
- Architect: Richard S. Requa
- Architectural style: Spanish Colonial Revival
- NRHP reference No.: 89001785
- CSRHP No.: 5EP.1222

Significant dates
- Added to NRHP: November 3, 1989
- Designated CSRHP: November 3, 1989

Carlton House is a historic Spanish Colonial Revival house located in Pine Valley of the United States Air Force Academy in Colorado Springs, Colorado. It has been used as a residence for Mrs. Albert E. Carlton, a country club called the Pine Valley Club and, among other Academy functions, a residence for the United States Air Force Academy Superintendent.

== Overview ==
Richard Requa, an architect from San Diego designed the Spanish Colonial Revival house. The main house was built in two phases: the first floor was completed in 1930 and the second floor was completed in 1935. A total of nine buildings were built on the Carlton House property, which includes two guest houses, an auxiliary kitchen, a tea house, pool house, bath house, two stables and a swimming pool. The complex sits on 25.9 acres of heavily wooded with pine, scrub oak and many varieties of evergreen. West Monument Creek crosses the southern edge of the property. Rampart Range to the west of the property affords scenic views from the house and property.

Richard Requa's designs were a "Southern California Style" of Spanish Colonial Revival architecture which he defined in his book Architectural Details: Spain and the Mediterranean:

- Buildings simple in mass and pleasing in outline and proportion
- Walls built of rough masonry, finished on the exterior with stucco, whitewashed or tinted light pastel shades
- Roofs either flat or low pitched, covered with well rounded, burned clay tiles
- Ornament used with restraint, discrimination, and with definite reason and purpose
- Exterior interest obtained by wrought iron, wood or stucco, window grilles, shutters, balconies or similar practical features
- Focal point of exterior usually the main entrance where the finest ornamental work is concentrated
- Courts, patios and gardens an indispensable feature of the architectural treatment

== Carlton residence ==
The house was first built as a residence for Albert E. Carlton and his wife Ethel Frizzell-Carlton. In 1928, Carlton purchased the property from William A. Otis to build a home for his wife. Carlton was a successful businessman, having invested in mines, banks and railroads. He was named "King of Cripple Creek" due to the success of his mines there, including Cresson Mine, "one of the most profitable mines in the town".

Mrs. Carlton had become enamored of the Spanish Colonial Revival architecture during her travels across Southern California. Subsequently architect Richard Requa was hired to design their home. The house was a "leading social center in the region." However, Carlton preferred to live at The Broadmoor resort and never lived at the Pine Valley home. Mr. Carlton died in 1931. Mrs. Carlton furnished the home with antiques that she purchased in Europe and lived there until 1950. She donated antique furnishings to The Broadmoor.

== Country Club ==
Jack Valentine of Florida purchased the property from Mrs. Carlton for the Pine Valley Club, a popular private country club with a golf course and swimming pool. He landscaped the property and built a pool house and auxiliary kitchen. He sold the property to the government in 1955.

== Air Force Academy ==
The house was used as a Junior-Senior High School during the period in which the School District 20 were completed. Then, due to funding considerations, the house was allocated for use as a home for the Academy Superintendent. Before the Cadet Chapel was completed, weddings were conducted on the property for cadets. It has also been used for visits by foreign dignitaries and Academy functions.

=== Buildings ===
All of the following buildings have a stuccoed exterior. The main house has two stories and the rest are one story buildings. Generally the interior walls are plaster. There are multiple courtyards among and between the buildings.

Building	Built	Comments
Main house	1930–1937	The 10,846 square feet house has large rooms for large, formal gatherings. The Academy has been able to purchase some of the original furnishings, or obtain similar reproductions, of those used originally in the Carlton House.
Tea house		It is a formal Spanish Colonial Revival 2,326 square foot house that is used for dignitaries and high level visitors.
Guest house 1		The 1,584 square feet house provides lodging for VIPs. Previously it was a servant's residence.
Guest house 2		It is 1,499 square feet and was previously a servant's residence.
Auxiliary kitchen	1950s	Built for Pine Valley Club.
Pool house	1950s	Built for Pine Valley Club.
Bath house	1950s	Built for Pine Valley Club.
Swimming pool	1950s	Built for Pine Valley Club. A decision was made in 2000 to remove and fill in the swimming pool to reduce annual maintenance costs for Carlton House by $10,000.
Stable 1		Currently not used.
Stable 2		Currently not used.
Garage	By 1937	The garage has stalls to accommodate 8 vehicles and has space for additional storage.

=== Maintenance costs ===
In 2000, Congress mandated that maintenance costs for generals' residences should not exceed $25,000 per year. Anything more than that would require approval. An audit of maintenance expenses found that $2.4 million total had been spent between 1987 and June, 1999; $500,000 covered by the military family housing budget and the remainder from the base operation and maintenance budget. It was estimated that an additional total of $1.2 million would be spent through the fiscal year end in 2006.

The auditors found that there were unwarranted expenditures and that there had been inconsistent tagging of public (Academy) vs. private (residential) space and resource usage, which affects which budget is used to pay the expenses. For instance, $300,000 was spent to renovate the kitchen, which had been identified as public space. However, there were about 1.4 functions per month that required the use of the kitchen and most of the improvements were thought to have benefited the residential occupants. Further, renovations were being made more frequently than was standard practice.

The audit stipulated that "Air Force guidance on historical housing facilities states bases should consider major upgrading, alternate uses, or disposing of historic housing if repair and maintenance costs become excessive."
