= Carlton-Frie-Tucker House =

Historic house in Massachusetts, United States

- U.S. National Register of Historic Places
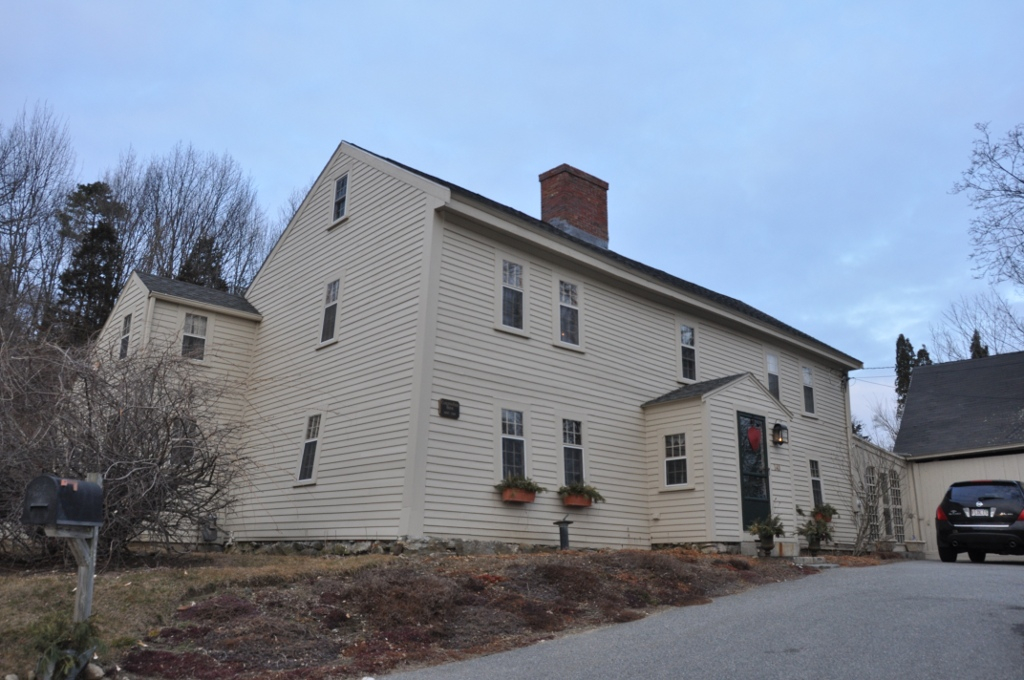

- Location within Massachusetts Location within the United States
- Location: 140 Mill Road, North Andover, Massachusetts
- Coordinates: 42°39′28″N 71°6′0″W
- Built: 1690
- Architectural style: Colonial
- MPS: First Period Buildings of Eastern Massachusetts TR
- NRHP reference No.: 90000251
- Added to NRHP: March 9, 1990

The Carlton-Frie-Tucker House is a historic First Period house in North Andover, Massachusetts. It is a rare example of a period building that was moved and added onto another which had been damaged by fire. The oldest portion of the house, its east side and center chimney, were probably built c. 1709 by Ebenezer Frie. The west side of the house is a second structure that was attached to the first in the 1760s, with some documentary and physical evidence that this was due to a fire destroying the original west side. A leanto section was added to the rear of the house in the 20th century, as was a wing on the northwest corner, connecting the house to its barn.

The house was listed on the National Register of Historic Places in 1990.

== See also ==
- National Register of Historic Places listings in Essex County, Massachusetts
- List of the oldest buildings in Massachusetts
