= Charles A. Carleton =

American military officer

Charles Arms Carleton
- Born: May 27, 1836
- Died: April 1, 1897 (aged 60)
- Military career
- Allegiance: United States
- Branch: Union Army
- Rank: Lieutenant Colonel; Brevet Brigadier General
- Units: 12th New York State Militia; 4th New Hampshire Infantry Regiment
- Conflicts: American Civil War

Charles Arms Carleton (May 27, 1836 – April 1, 1897) was a Union Army major during the American Civil War and a lieutenant colonel and assistant adjutant-general at the end of the war, who was nominated in 1868 and confirmed in 1869 as a brevet brigadier general of volunteers.

Carleton began the war as a private with the 12th New York State Militia, a 3-month regiment, and on September 18, 1861, was appointed a first lieutenant and adjutant with the 4th New Hampshire Volunteer Infantry. He was a lieutenant colonel and assistant adjutant-general for Brigadier General Adelbert Ames from July 8, 1865, to August 1, 1865. He was mustered out of the volunteers on December 19, 1865.

On December 8, 1868, President Andrew Johnson nominated Carleton for appointment to the grade of brevet brigadier general of volunteers, to rank from March 13, 1865, and the United States Senate confirmed the appointment on February 16, 1869.

Charles A. Carleton died on April 1, 1897, at New York City. He was interred at the Evergreen Cemetery (Brooklyn, New York City).

== See also ==
- List of American Civil War brevet generals (Union)
