= Colston-Ariston =

British electrical appliance manufacturer

Colston was a British electrical appliance manufacturer, founded by former director of The Hoover Company Sir Charles Colston in 1955, that made compact dishwashers.

In 1962 it merged with entrepreneur John Bloom's rapidly expanding Rolls Razor washing machine company, which also concluded a deal to distribute Prestcold refrigerators. However the company hit difficulties due to conventional retailers slashing prices in response, a postal strike that dried up their supplies of coupons which was their only source of obtaining customers, and arguably, market saturation. As sales began to slow, Bloom cut prices and introduced ‘double offers’ such as washing machine and fridge packages, free weekend breaks and even his own trading stamps. The company collapsed in 1964 with massive debts. Liquidators found thousands of unsold washing machines in warehouses.

Manufacture continued with machines built by the engineering company Tallent (who had built the company's dishwashers, and was one of the company's major creditors). Tallent briefly re-branded the machines under its own name, but by 1965 they were marketed as Colstons before the appliance division of Tallent was taken over by the Italian firm Ariston in 1979.

Production of the twin tub was continued by Tallent but now branded Colston. The company then decided to source a larger dishwasher and front loading washing machine from Italy. Colston was the first company to introduce a washer drier to the UK market place. Gradually with the help of Colston, these products were improved considerably during the 1970s and the company was profitable. Michael Colston then decided to sell the company to the Italian company Merloni who made all sorts of products including the Ariston brand. Initially the company traded as Colston-Ariston, dropping the Colston name after a few years. The service division split from the sales division as Ariston Group Service under Don Campbell. The sales division now not only sold a huge range of domestic appliances, White Goods, but also had a built in division as well as selling complete kitchens. Finally there was a baths and water heating division selling a top range of baths, heating elements and gas boilers under Malcolm Blount. The first years trading of the new group made enough profit to pay for the take over but after that the sales side continually struggled. The Service side continued to make good annual profits but after a few years heads began to roll and new appointments made. In the mid 80's Italy installed their own head of sales and even though the service side was profitable, Italy wanted it run closer to the Italian model. The service workforce started to fragment after being run like a family over decades. Some managers left followed by Don Campbell on a matter of principle. By this time Ariston had taken over Indesit and it was decided to amalgamate the service divisions. Further take overs included Creda and Hotpoint to make Merloni one of the biggest domestic appliance companies operating in the UK.
