= Elgin Avenue =

Street in London, England

Coordinates: 51.5276°N 0.1911°W

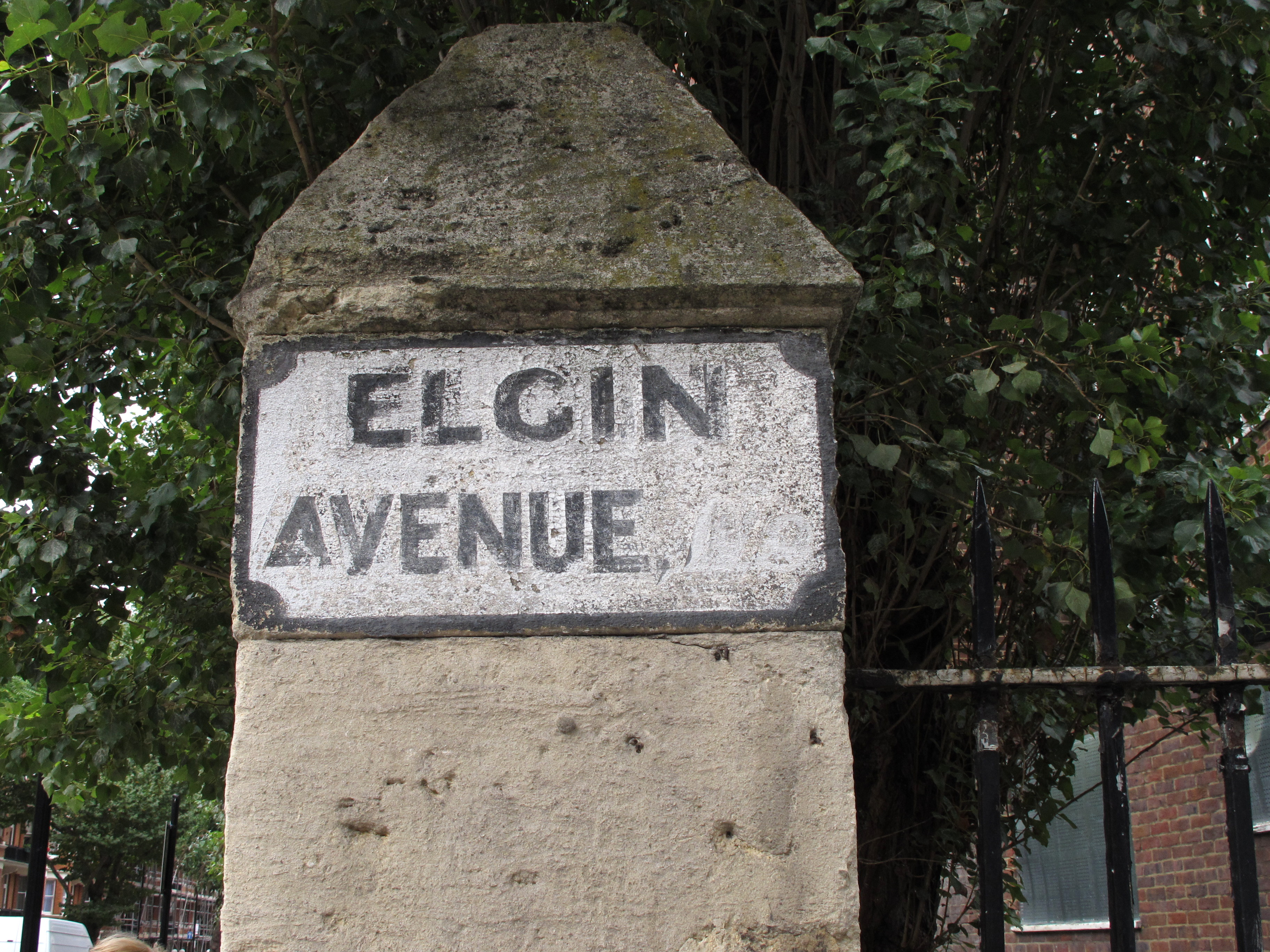
Old street sign.

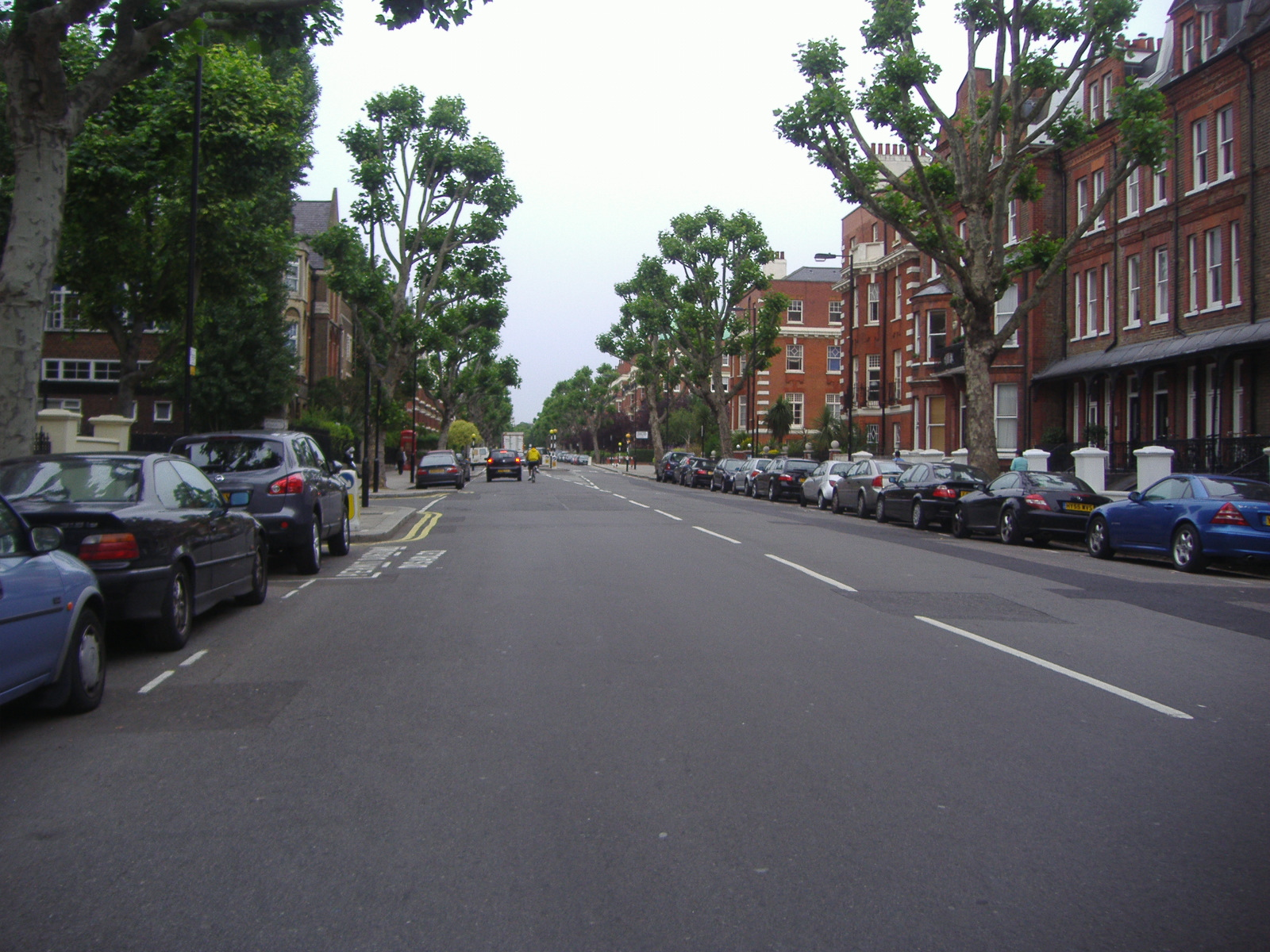
Red brick buildings are a feature of the street.

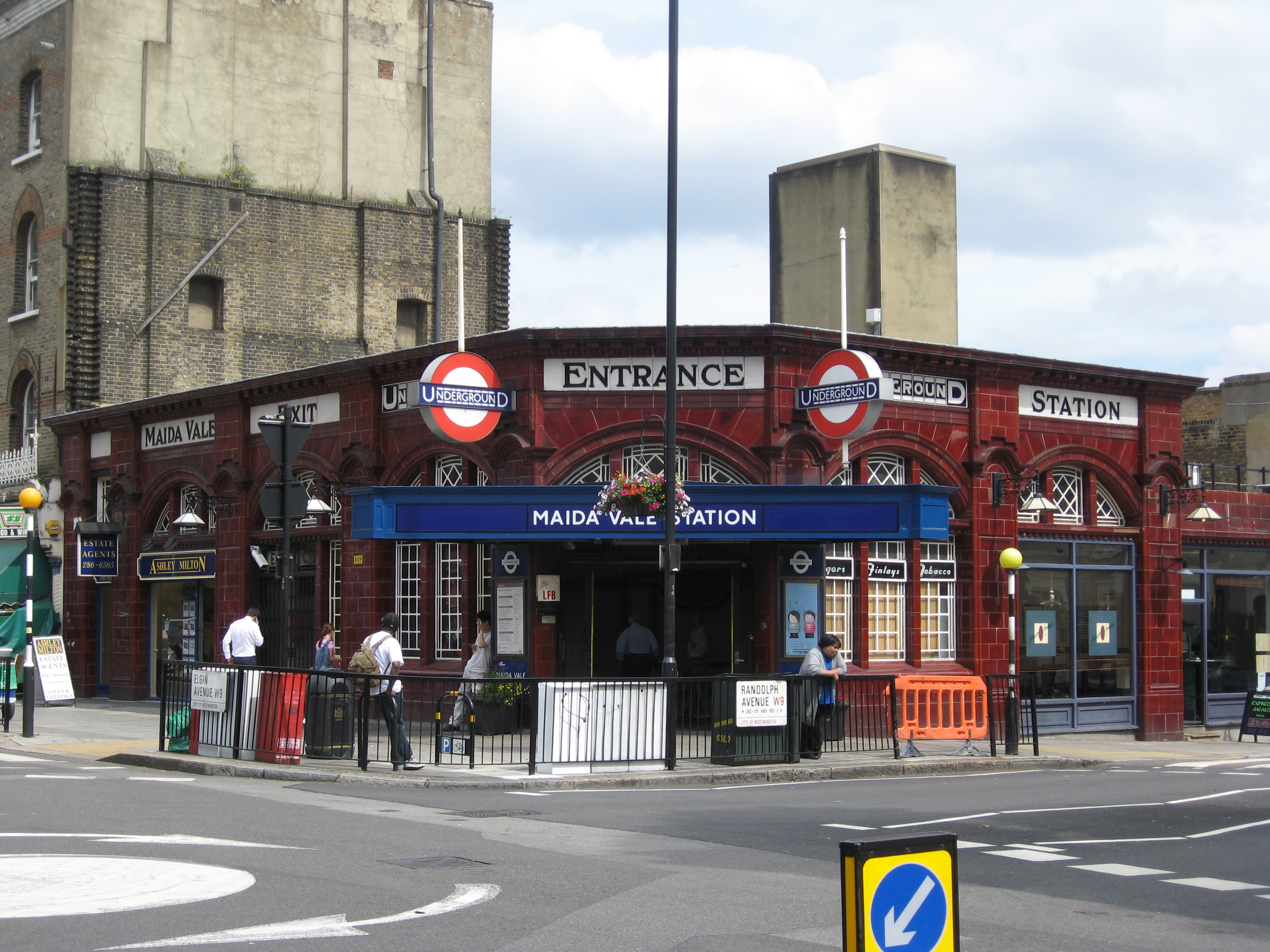
Maida Vale tube station entrance.

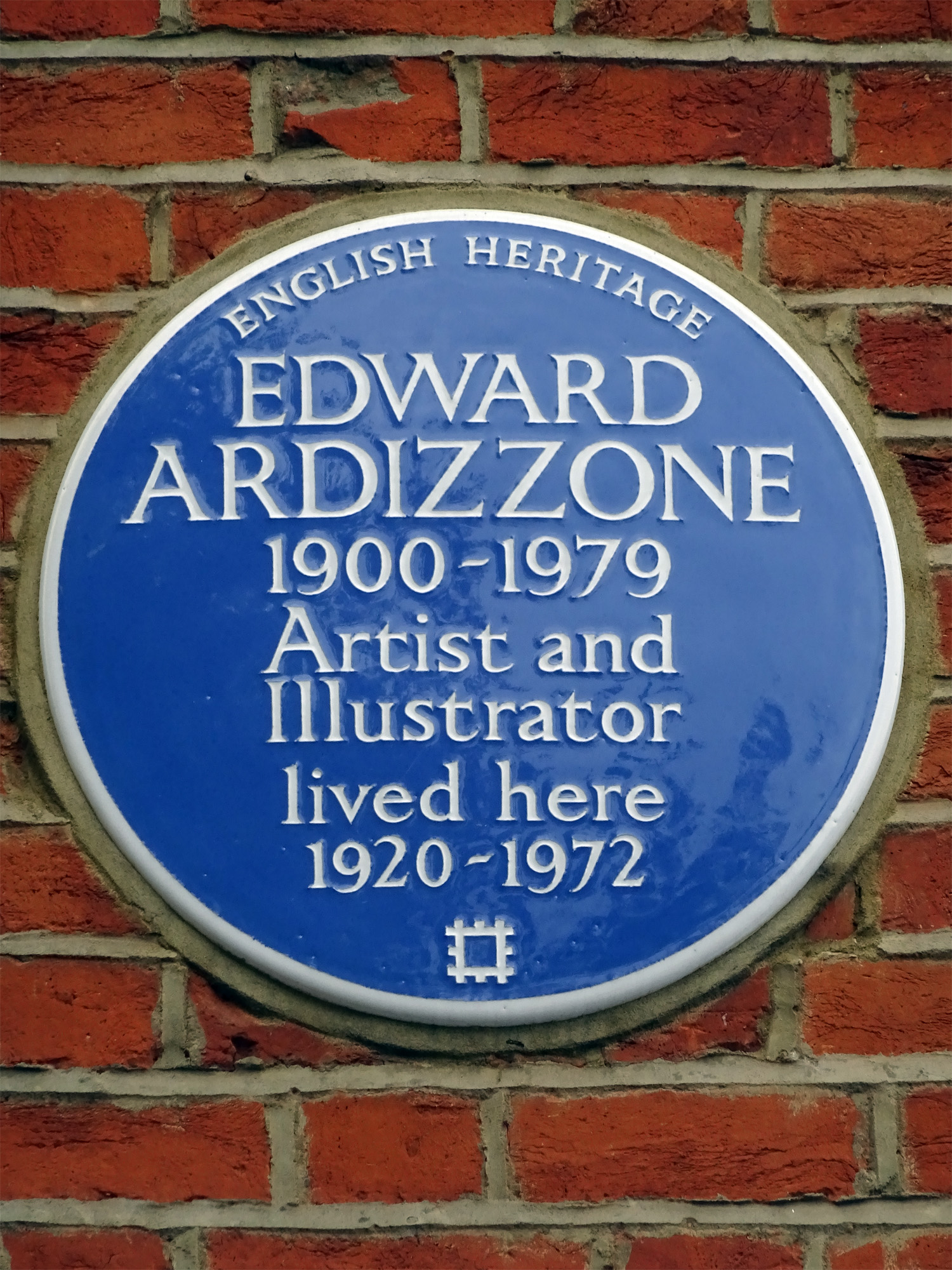
Blue plaque for the artist Edward Ardizzone.

Elgin Avenue is a street in Maida Vale in London, located in the City of Westminster. It is an avenue running east to west from the Edgware Road close to Maida Vale tube station to the Maida Hill area where it meets the Harrow Road. Along the route it is crossed or joined by Randolph Avenue, Warrington Crescent, Lauderdale Road, Castellain Road, and Shirland Road. Sutherland Avenue runs roughly parallel to the south. The road continues east of the Edgware Road as Abercorn Place which runs through St. John's Wood.

The area was built as part of the rapid expansion of London in the first half of the nineteenth century. It was laid out as part of a plan for the area by the architect George Gutch in 1827, who envisaged a series of long avenues. While isolated villas were built from the 1820s, it was not for several decades that the street was completed. It was known as Elgin Road until 1886, and takes its name from the Lord Elgin Arms public house. Later in the century many of the original villas were replaced by mansion blocks.

In 1915 the new Maida Vale tube station was opened as part of an extension of the Bakerloo Line north from Paddington. It is located on the corner of the junction of Elgin Avenue and Randolph Avenue and is Grade II listed and was designed by Stanley Heaps. It was originally proposed to name the station Elgin Avenue, but Maida Vale was ultimately chosen to reflect the wider area.

The artist Edward Ardizzone lived in the street from 1920 to 1972 and is now commemorated with a blue plaque. Artist and political activist Peter Kennard was born on Elgin Avenue in Maida Vale.

From 1972, perhaps a thousand people squatted for various periods of time in Elgin Avenue. The occupation of terrace houses in the street ended on 15 October 1975, when the 200 barricaded squatters remaining were offered rehousing by the authorities in a deal brokered by Piers Corbyn of the Squatter Action Committee.

== Bibliography ==
- Bebbington, Gillian. London Street Names. Batsford, 1972.
- Cockburn, J. S., King, H. P. F. & McDonnell, K. G. T. & A History of the County of Middlesex. Institute of Historical Research, 1989.
- Coysh, Louise. Labyrinth: A Journey Through London's Underground by Mark Wallinger. Art Books Publishing, 6 Oct 2014.
- Cherry, Bridget & Pevsner, Nikolaus. London 3: North West. Yale University Press, 2002.
