= Carlton Vale =

Street in London

Coordinates: 51.5323°N 0.1909°W

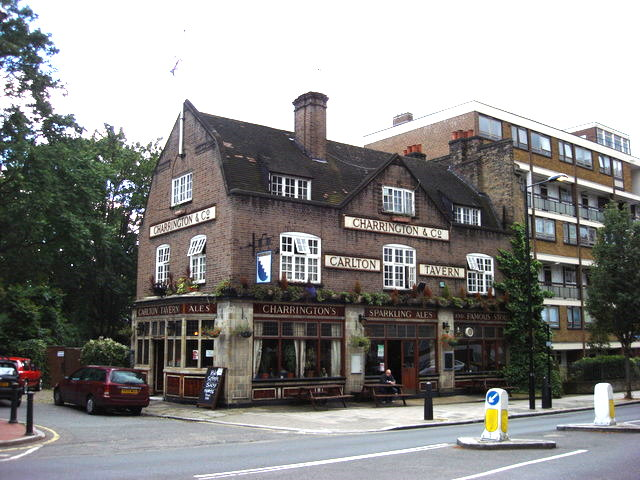
The Carlton Tavern in 2007.

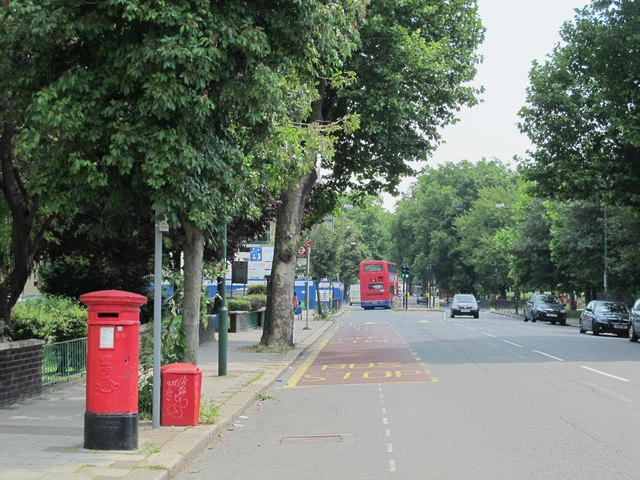
View of Carlton vale.

Carlton Vale is a street that runs through Kilburn and Maida Vale in London. Some of its route forms the boundary between the City of Westminster to the south and the London Borough of Brent to the north. To the west the street continues as Kilburn Lane through Queen's Park, while to the east it becomes Carlton Hill running into St. John's Wood. Carlton Vale crosses or meets several roads including Kilburn Park Road, Cambridge Road and Randolph Avenue.

Carlton was a popular name in the Regency era and beyond, suggesting an "ambience of elegance" linked to the Carlton House residence of the Prince Regent. The street was developed in the mid-nineteenth century and was originally known as Carlton Road. Most of the original buildings were Victorian, although few survive today. The Anglo-Catholic St. Augustine's Church was built just north of Carlton Vale to serve the growing population of the area. To the south of the street is Paddington Recreation Ground.

The street suffered heavily from German bombing during the Second World War, and was rebuilt in the postwar era with modernist buildings. Particularly notable is the South Kilburn estate. The Carlton Tavern pub was built in the 1920s by the Charrington Brewery. Demolished in 2015 shortly before it was about to be listed, it was rebuilt in its original form and reopened in 2021.

== Carlton Hill ==
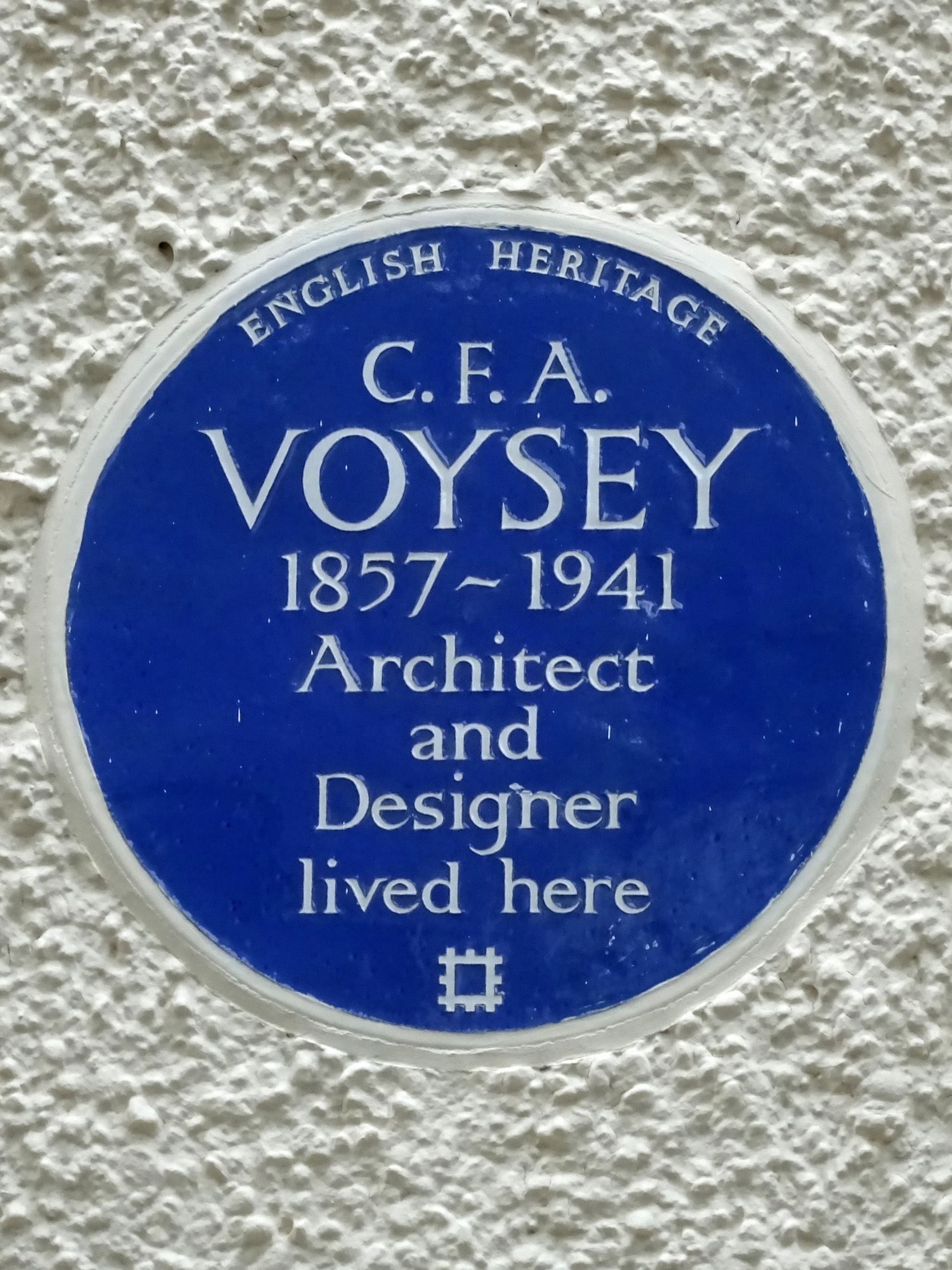
Blue plaque commemorating C.F.A. Voysey.

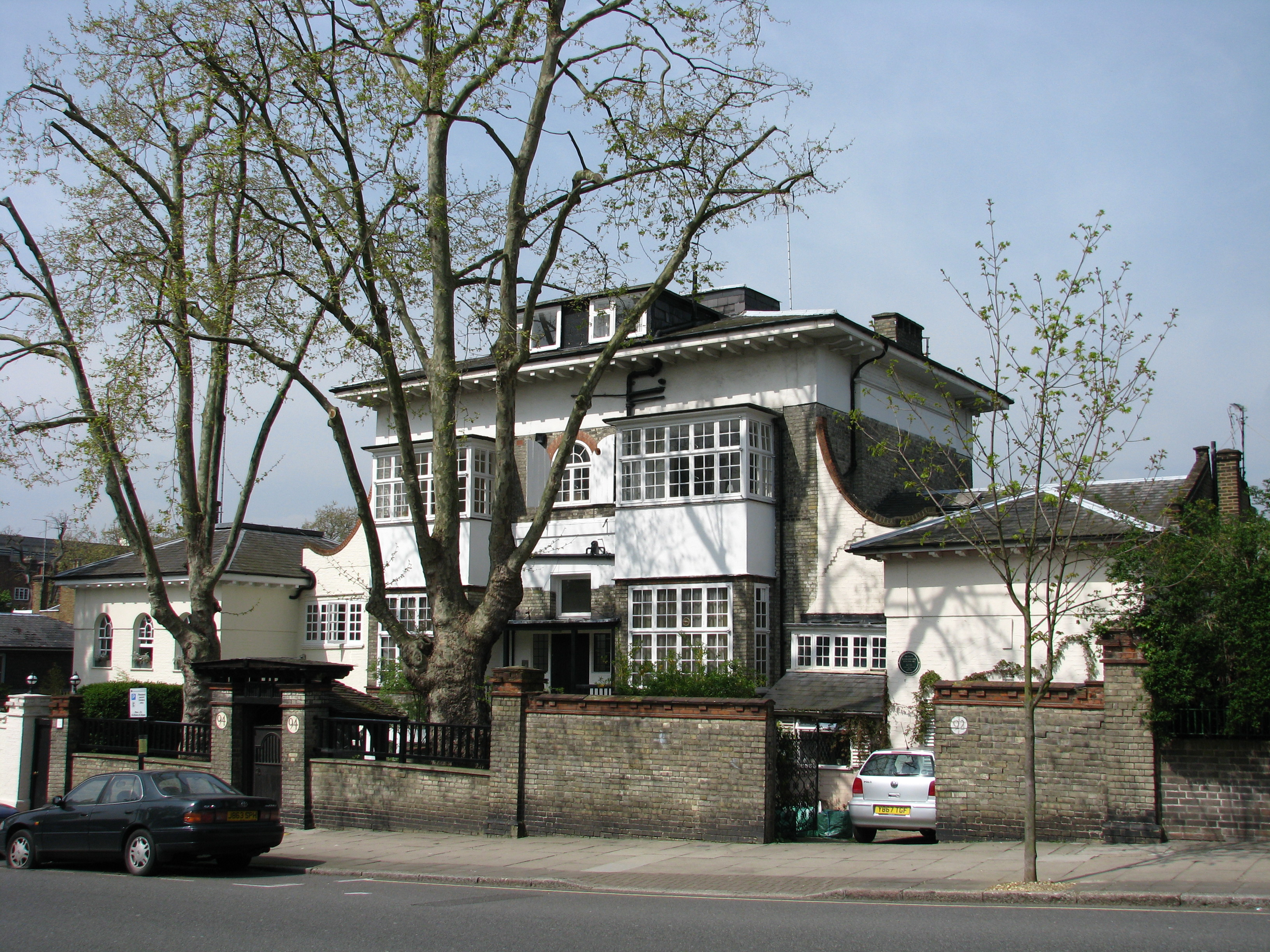
House of the sculptor Arthur Fleischmann.

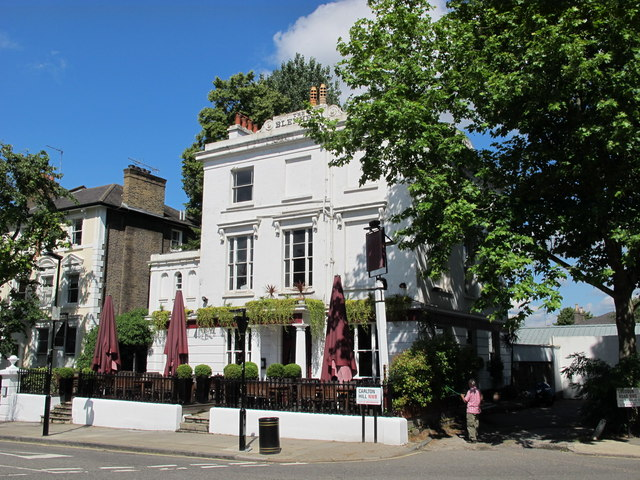
The former Blenheim Arms public house.

Unlike Carlton Vale, Carlton Hill retains many of its original buildings a number of which are now listed. Notable residents have included the textile designer C.F.A. Voysey who is now commemorated with a blue plaque and the sculptor Arthur Fleischmann whose house features a City of Westminster plaque. The former Blenheim Arms public house, built in the 1840s, is located at the junction with Loudoun Road.

== Bibliography ==
- Bebbington, Gillian. London Street Names. Batsford, 1972.
- Cockburn, J. S., King, H. P. F. & McDonnell, K. G. T. & A History of the County of Middlesex. Institute of Historical Research, 1989.
- Cherry, Bridget & Pevsner, Nikolaus. London 3: North West. Yale University Press, 2002.
