= Carleton Perry =

American politician

Member of the Wyoming House of Representatives
- In office 1977–1983

Member of the Wyoming State Senate
- In office 1988–1989

Personal details
- Born: December 1, 1931 Ware, Massachusetts, U.S.
- Died: March 6, 2017 (aged 85) Sheridan, Wyoming, U.S.
- Party: Republican

Carleton F. Perry (December 1, 1931 – March 6, 2017) was an American politician in the state of Wyoming.

He attended the University of Wyoming.

He served in the Wyoming House of Representatives and Wyoming State Senate as a member of the Republican Party.

He was a rancher.
