= Randolph Avenue =

Street in London, England

Coordinates: 51.52902°N 0.18492°W

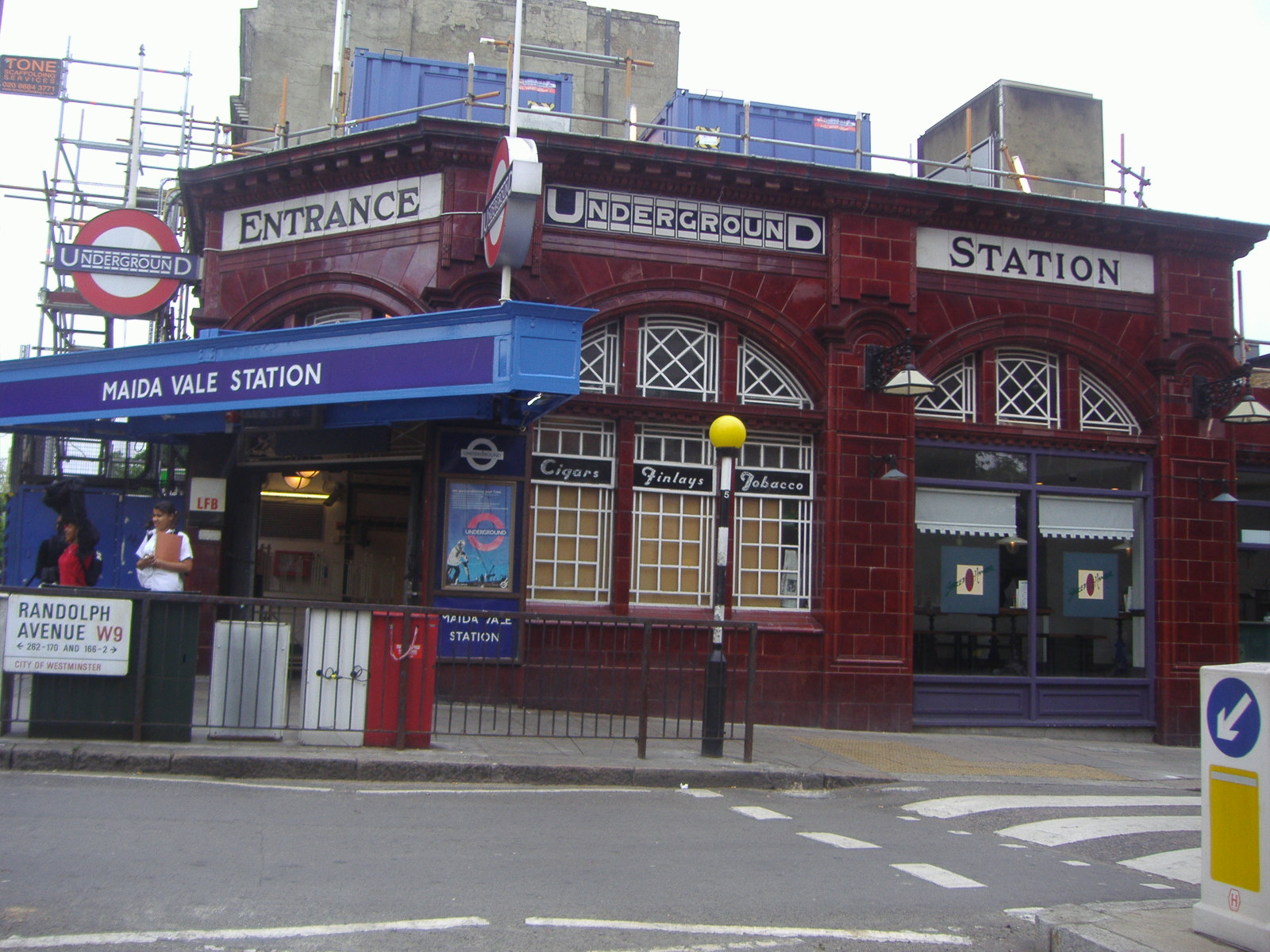
Entrance to Maida Vale tube station.

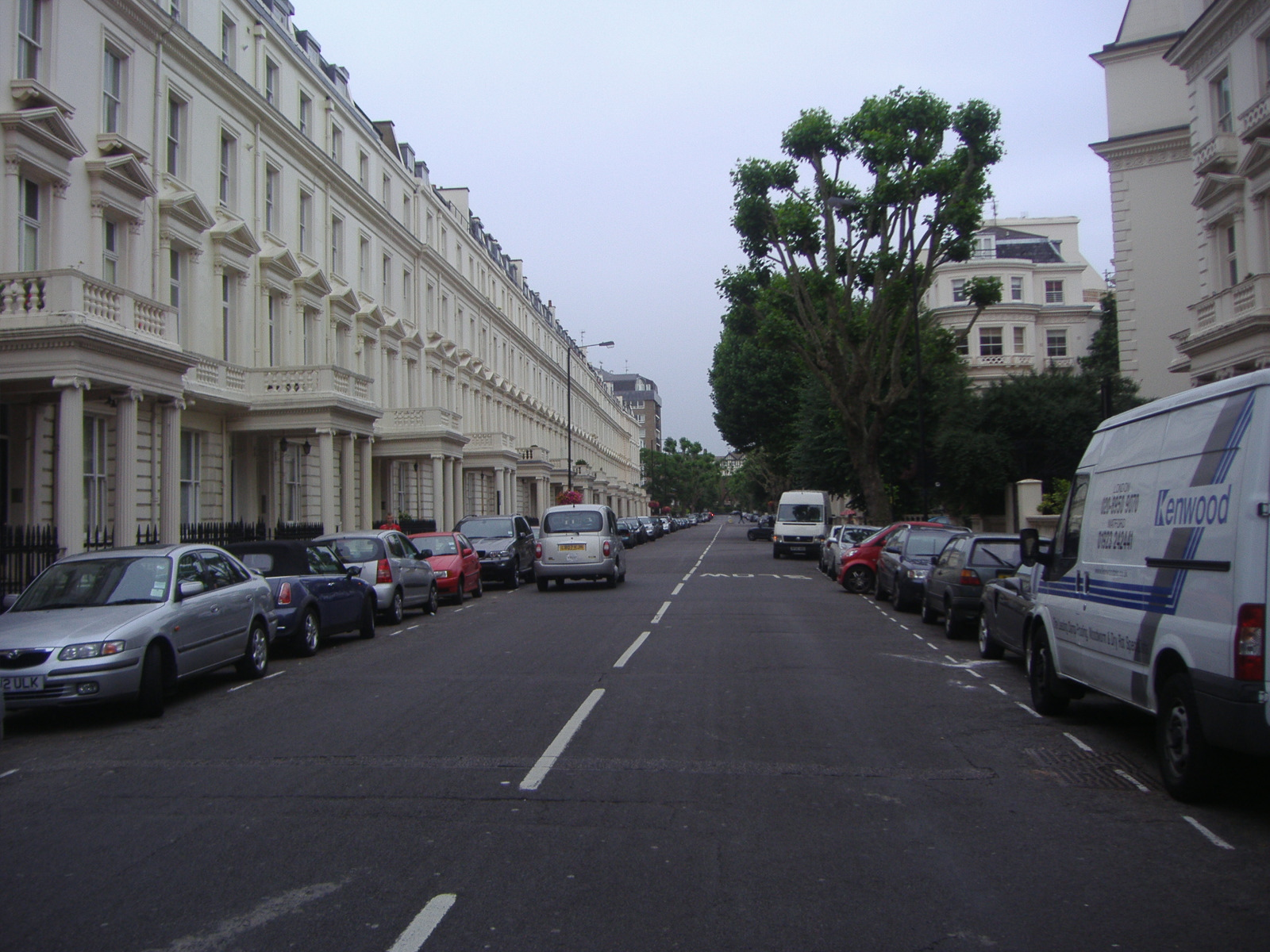
White stucco terraces are a feature of the street.

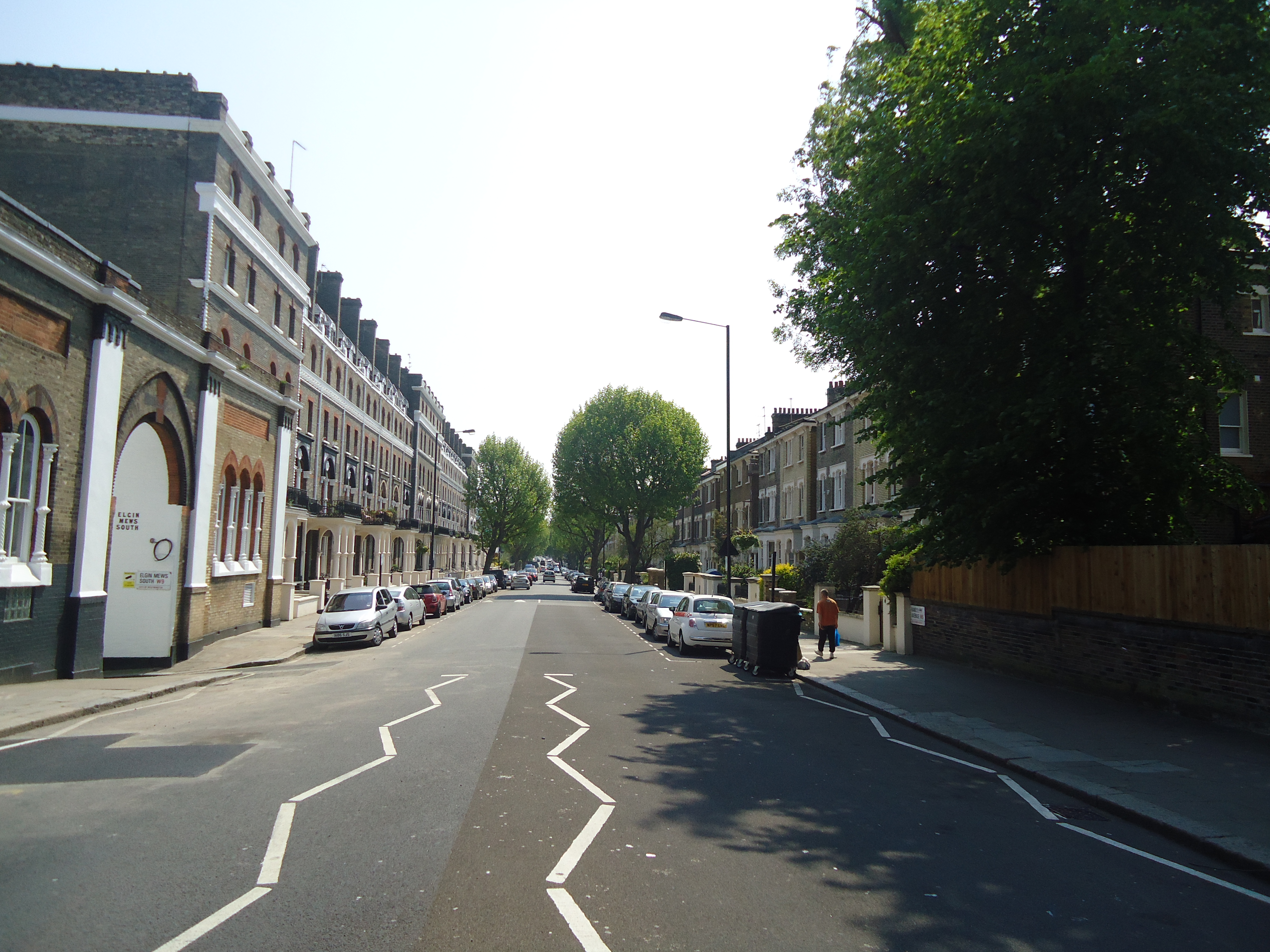
Looking south from the tube station.

Randolph Avenue is a street in Maida Vale in London. Located in the City of Westminster, it is a long avenue running from north to south. The southern end is located in Little Venice near to the Paddington branch of the Grand Union Canal. The street runs northwards, crossing Clifton Gardens, Sutherland Avenue (near to its junction with Warrington Crescent), Elgin Avenue and Carlton Vale. The road then continues as Randolph Gardens until it meets Kilburn Park Road. The Edgware Road runs directly parallel to Randolph Avenue to the east.

The street was part of an ambitious plan for the area laid out by the architect George Gutch in the 1820s to accommodate the expanding population of the capital. Development took several decades with many buildings constructed in the first half of the Victorian era, particularly the 1860s. For much of its existence it was known as Portsdown Road, but was renamed in 1939. It is a largely residential street. The southern end of the road features white stucco terraces but these give way to brick-fronted buildings further north including redbrick mansion blocks. Maida Vale tube station was opened in 1915 at the junction of the street and Elgin Avenue and is now Grade II listed. A number of other properties in Randolph Avenue are also listed.

Notable residents of the street have included the painter Eliza Anne Leslie-Melville and the illustrator John Tenniel. Tenniel's residence had a blue plaque, placed by the London County Council, on it from 1930 until 1959 when the house was demolished for redevelopment.

== Bibliography ==
- Bebbington, Gillian. London Street Names. Batsford, 1972.
- Cockburn, J. S., King, H. P. F. & McDonnell, K. G. T. & A History of the County of Middlesex. Institute of Historical Research, 1989.
- Cherry, Bridget & Pevsner, Nikolaus. London 3: North West. Yale University Press, 2002.
- Hibbert, Christopher Weinreb, Ben, Keay, John & Keay, Julia. The London Encyclopaedia. Pan Macmillan, 2011.
- Morris, Frankie. Artist of Wonderland: The Life, Political Cartoons, and Illustrations of Tenniel. ISD LLC, 2023.
