= List of acts of the Parliament of Victoria from 1994 =

This is a list of acts of the Parliament of Victoria, Australia for the year 1994.

== 1994 ==
Short title, or popular name	Citation	Royal assent
Long title
Employment and Training (Amendment) Act 1994 (repealed)	No. 1 of 1994	
(Repealed by Statute Law Revision (Repeals) Act 1999 (No. 3 of 1999))
Albury-Wodonga Agreement (Amendment) Act 1994 (repealed)	No. 3 of 1994	
(Repealed by Statute Law Revision (Repeals) Act 1999 (No. 3 of 1999))
Borrowing and Investment Powers (Further Amendment) Act 1994 (repealed)	No. 4 of 1994	
(Repealed by Statute Law Revision (Repeals) Act 1999 (No. 3 of 1999))
Small Business Development Corporation (Amendment) Act 1994 (repealed)	No. 9 of 1994	
(Repealed by Statute Law (Further Revision) Act 2006 (No. 29 of 2006))
Agent-General's Act 1994 (repealed)	No. 11 of 1994	3 May 1994
An Act to repeal and re-enact with amendments the Agent-General's Act 1958 (Note: Agent-General's Act 1958 (No. 6193)) and for other purposes. (Repealed by Agent-General and Commissioners for Victoria Act 2007 (No. 64 of 2007))
Food (Amendment) Act 1994	No. 13 of 1994	
(Repealed by Legislation Reform (Repeals No. 1) Act 2008 (No. 10 of 2008))
Legal Aid Commission (Amendment) Act 1994 (repealed)	No. 14 of 1994	
(Repealed by Statute Law Revision (Repeals) Act 1999 (No. 3 of 1999))
State Insurance Office (Amendment) Act 1994 (repealed)	No. 15 of 1994	
(Repealed by Statute Law Revision (Repeals) Act 1999 (No. 3 of 1999))
Wheat Marketing (Amendment) Act 1994 (repealed)	No. 16 of 1994	
(Repealed by Statute Law Revision (Repeals) Act 1999 (No. 3 of 1999))
Financial Management Act 1994	No. 18 of 1994	10 May 1994
An Act relating to financial management, to repeal the Public Account Act 1958 (Note: Public Account Act 1958 (No. 6345)) and the Annual Reporting Act 1983, (Note: Annual Reporting Act 1983 (No. 9941)) to make consequential amendments to other Acts and for other purposes.
Children and Young Persons (Miscellaneous Amendments) Act 1994 (repealed)	No. 19 of 1994	
(Repealed by Legislation Reform (Repeals No. 1) Act 2008 (No. 10 of 2008))
Equipment (Public Safety) Act 1994	No. 21 of 1994	17 May 1994
An Act to provide for public safety in relation to prescribed equipment and equipment sites, to amend the Occupational Health and Safety Act 1985 (Note: Occupational Health and Safety Act 1985 (No. 10190)) and Schedule 4 to the Magistrates' Court Act 1989. (Note: Magistrates' Court Act 1989 (No. 51 of 1989))
Medical Practice Act 1994	No. 23 of 1994	17 May 1994
An Act to make further provision for the registration of medical practitioners, the investigation into the professional conduct or fitness to practise of registered medical practitioners, to regulate the advertising of medical services, to establish the Medical Practitioners Board of Victoria and the Medical Practitioners Board Fund of Victoria, to repeal the Medical Practitioners Act 1970, (Note: Medical Practitioners Act 1970 (No. 8061)) to make various amendments to other Acts and for other purposes.
State Bank of South Australia (Transfer of Undertaking) Act 1994 (repealed)	No. 25 of 1994	17 May 1994
An Act to provide for the transfer of part of the undertaking of the State Bank of South Australia to a company formed to carry on the business of banking under the law of the Commonwealth and for other purposes. (Repealed by Treasury Legislation (Repeal) Act 2005 (No. 73 of 2005))
Control of Weapons (Amendment) Act 1994 (repealed)	No. 30 of 1994	
(Repealed by Statute Law Revision (Repeals) Act 1999 (No. 3 of 1999))
Financial Management (Consequential Amendments) Act 1994 (repealed)	No. 31 of 1994	31 May 1994
An Act to make amendments to certain Acts consequential on the enactment of the Financial Management Act 1994 (Note: Financial Management Act 1994 (No. 18 of 1994)) and for other purposes. (Repealed by Statute Law Revision (Repeals) Act 1999 (No. 3 of 1999))
Land Conservation (Amendment) Act 1994 (repealed)	No. 32 of 1994	
(Repealed by Statute Law Revision (Repeals) Act 1999 (No. 3 of 1999))
Subdivision (Further Amendment) Act 1994 (repealed)	No. 34 of 1994	
(Repealed by Statute Law Repeals Act 2012 (No. 30 of 2012))
Treasury Corporation of Victoria (Amendment) Act 1994 (repealed)	No. 35 of 1994	
(Repealed by Statute Law Revision (Repeals) Act 1999 (No. 3 of 1999))
Casino Control (Miscellaneous Amendments) Act 1994 (repealed)	No. 36 of 1994	
(Repealed by Statute Law Revision (Repeals) Act 1999 (No. 3 of 1999))
Gaming and Betting Act 1994	No. 37 of 1994	2 June 1994
An Act to make provision for the undertaking of certain wagering, betting and gaming businesses under licence, to amend the Racing Act 1958, (Note: Racing Act 1958 (No. 6353)) the Gaming Control Act 1991, (Note: Gaming Machine Control Act 1991 (No. 53 of 1991)) the Club Keno Act 1993, (Note: Club Keno Act 1993 (No. 56 of 1993)) the Casino Control Act 1991 (Note: Casino Control Act 1991 (No. 47 of 1991)) and certain other Acts and for other purposes.
Appropriation (Parliament) (Interim 1994-95) Act 1994 (repealed)	No. 38 of 1994	7 June 1994
An Act to make interim appropriation of moneys out of the Consolidated Fund for recurrent services and for certain works and purposes for the Parliament for the period July to October 1994. (Repealed by Statute Law Revision (Repeals) Act 1999 (No. 3 of 1999))
Melbourne Exhibition Centre Act 1994 (repealed)	No. 41 of 1994	7 June 1994
An Act to establish a Melbourne Exhibition Centre Trust to administer a Melbourne Exhibition Centre and for other purposes. (Repealed by Melbourne Convention and Exhibition Trust Act 1996 (No. 71 of 1996))
Office of the Regulator-General Act 1994 (repealed)	No. 42 of 1994	7 June 1994
An Act to establish the Office of the Regulator-General and to create an economic regulatory framework for regulated industries and for other purposes. (Repealed by Essential Services Commission Act 2001 (No. 62 of 2001))
Public Prosecutions Act 1994	No. 43 of 1994	7 June 1994
An Act to provide for the appointment of a Director of Public Prosecutions, a Chief Crown Prosecutor, Crown Prosecutors and a Solicitor for Public Prosecutions, to require that certain decisions be made by the Director of Public Prosecutions only after obtaining the advice of a Committee, to make fresh provision with respect to the manner of dealing with certain contempts of court, to establish an Office of Public Prosecutions and a Committee for Public Prosecutions, to repeal the Director of Public Prosecutions Act 1982, (Note: Director of Public Prosecutions Act 1982 (No. 9848)) to amend the Constitution Act 1975, (Note: Constitution Act 1975 (No. 8750)) the County Court Act 1958 (Note: County Court Act 1958 (No. 6230)) and the Crimes (Criminal Trials) Act 1993 (Note: Crimes (Criminal Trials) Act 1993 (No. 60 of 1993)) and make consequential amendments to certain other Acts and for other purposes.
Swan Hill Pioneer Settlement Authority (Repeal) Act 1994	No. 46 of 1994	7 June 1994
An Act to transfer the management of the Swan Hill Pioneer Settlement to the Swan Hill City Council, and to repeal the Swan Hill Pioneer Settlement Act 1974, (Note: Swan Hill Pioneer Settlement Act 1974 (No. 8548)) the Coal Creek Historical Park Act 1975 (Note: Coal Creek Historical Park Act 1975 (No. 8757)) and the Gippsland Folk Museum Act 1976 (Note: Gippsland Folk Museum Act 1976 (No. 8850)) and for other purposes.
Catchment and Land Protection Act 1994	No. 52 of 1994	15 June 1994
An Act to establish a system of integrated management and protection for catchments, to establish a framework for controlling noxious weeds and pest animals, to repeal the Soil Conservation and Land Utilization Act 1958 (Note: Soil Conservation and Land Utilization Act 1958 (No. 6372)) and the Vermin and Noxious Weeds Act 1958, (Note: Vermin and Noxious Weeds Act 1958 (No. 6409)) to amend various other Acts and for other purposes.
Southgate Project Act 1994	No. 57 of 1994	15 June 1994
An Act to facilitate the Southgate project and for other purposes.
Victorian Funds Management Corporation Act 1994	No. 61 of 1994	15 June 1994
An Act to establish a Victorian Funds Management Corporation, to amend the Borrowing and Investment Powers Act 1987 (Note: Borrowing and Investment Powers Act 1987 (No. 13 of 1987)) and the Transport Accident Act 1986 (Note: Transport Accident Act 1986 (No. 111 of 1986)) and for other purposes.
Westernport (Crib Point Terminal) Act 1994	No. 63 of 1994	15 June 1994
An Act to facilitate the development and operation of a petroleum terminal at Crib Point, to amend the Westernport (Oil Refinery) Act 1963, (Note: Westernport (Oil Refinery) Act 1963 (No. 7018)) to repeal the Westernport (Oil Refinery) (Further Agreement) Act 1985 (Note: Westernport (Oil Refinery) (Further Agreement) Act 1985 (No. 10197)) and the Westernport (Oil Refinery) Land Act 1990, (Note: Westernport (Oil Refinery) Land Act 1990 (No. 71 of 1990)) to clarify the status of certain pipeline agreements and for other purposes.
Margarine (Repeal) Act 1994	No. 64 of 1994	18 October 1994
An Act to repeal the Margarine Act 1975 (Note: Margarine Act 1975 (No. 8720)) and for other purposes.
Australian Grand Prix Act 1994 or the Australian Grands Prix Act 1994	No. 68 of 1994	25 October 1994
An Act to establish a body corporate to be known as the Australian Grand Prix Corporation, to amend the Borrowing and Investment Powers Act 1987 and the Liquor Control Act 1987 (Note: Liquor Control Act 1987 (No. 97 of 1987)) and for other purposes.
Emerald Tourist Railway (Amendment) Act 1994 (repealed)	No. 70 of 1994	25 October 1994
An Act to amend the Emerald Tourist Railway Act 1977. (Note: Emerald Tourist Railway Act 1977 (No. 9020)) (Repealed by Statute Law Revision (Repeals) Act 1999 (No. 3 of 1999))
Como Project Act 1994 (repealed)	No. 74 of 1994	22 November 1994
An Act to repeal the South Yarra Project Act 1984 (Note: South Yarra Project Act 1984 (No. 10153)) and to amend the South Yarra Project (Subdivision and Management) Act 1985 (Note: South Yarra Project (Subdivision and Management) Act 1985 (No. 10215)) and for other purposes. (Repealed by Legislation Reform (Repeals No. 2) Act 2008 (No. 16 of 2008))
Financial Management (Amendment) Act 1994 (repealed)	No. 75 of 1994	22 November 1994
An Act to amend the Financial Management Act 1994 in relation to supply management and various other matters, to amend other Acts and for other purposes. (Repealed by Statute Law Revision (Repeals) Act 1999 (No. 3 of 1999))
Therapeutic Goods (Victoria) Act 1994	No. 79 of 1994	22 November 1994
An Act relating to therapeutic goods, to make consequential amendments to certain Acts and for other purposes.
Domestic (Feral and Nuisance) Animals Act 1994 or the Domestic Animals Act 1994	No. 81 of 1994	29 November 1994
An Act to provide for the management of feral and nuisance domestic animals, the regulation of domestic animals and domestic animal businesses, to repeal the Dog Act 1970 (Note: Dog Act 1970 (No. 8079)) and for other purposes.
Project Development and Construction Management Act 1994	No. 101 of 1994	13 December 1994
An Act to facilitate certain development projects in Victoria, to provide for the setting of standards and the issuing of directions in relation to public construction, to establish the Secretary to the Department of Planning and Development as a body corporate, to provide for the transfer of certain matters from the Urban Land Authority to the Secretary to the Department of Planning and Development, to amend the Bayside Project Act 1988, (Note: Bayside Project Act 1988 (No. 67 of 1988)) to repeal the Public Lands and Works Act 1964, (Note: Public Lands and Works Act 1964 (No. 7228)) and to make consequential amendments to other Acts and for other purposes.
Prostitution Control Act 1994	No. 102 of 1994	13 December 1994
An Act to reform the law relating to prostitution, to repeal the Prostitution Regulation Act 1986 (Note: Prostitution Regulation Act 1986 (No. 124 of 1986)) and the Town and Country Planning (Miscellaneous Provisions) Act 1961, (Note: Town and Country Planning Act 1961 (No. 6849)) to amend the Crimes Act 1958, (Note: Crimes Act 1958 (No. 6231)) the Evidence Act 1958 (Note: Evidence Act 1958 (No. 6246)) and the Travel Agents Act 1986 (Note: Travel Agents Act 1986 (No. 52 of 1986)) and make consequential amendments to certain other Acts and for other purposes.
Queen Victoria Women's Centre Act 1994	No. 103 of 1994	13 December 1994
An Act to establish the Queen Victoria Women's Centre Trust to own and manage a women's centre and for other purposes.
Subordinate Legislation Act 1994	No. 104 of 1994	13 December 1994
An Act to re-enact with amendments the law relating to subordinate legislation, to amend the Interpretation of Legislation Act 1984, (Note: Interpretation of Legislation Act 1984 (No. 10096)) to repeal the Subordinate Legislation Act 1962 (Note: Subordinate Legislation Act 1962 (No. 6886)) and the Amendments Incorporation Act 1958, (Note: Amendments Incorporation Act 1958 (No. 6422)) to make consequential amendments to certain Acts and for other purposes.
University Acts (Amendment) Act 1994 (repealed)	No. 105 of 1994	
(Repealed by Statute Law Repeals Act 2012 (No. 30 of 2012))
Vocational Education and Training (State Training Wage) Act 1994 (repealed)	No. 106 of 1994	
(Repealed by Statute Law Revision (Repeals) Act 1999 (No. 3 of 1999))
Classification of Films and Publications (Amendment) Act 1994 (repealed)	No. 107 of 1994	
(Repealed by Statute Law Revision (Repeals) Act 1999 (No. 3 of 1999))
Environment Effects (Amendment) Act 1994 (repealed)	No. 111 of 1994	
(Repealed by Statute Law Revision (Repeals) Act 1999 (No. 3 of 1999))
Gas Industry Act 1994 or the Gas Industry (Residual Provisions) Act 1994	No. 112 of 1994	20 December 1994
An Act to restructure the gas industry, to amend the Gas and Fuel Corporation Act 1958 (Note: Gas and Fuel Corporation Act 1958 (No. 6260)) and certain other Acts and for other purposes.
Land Tax (Amendment) Act 1994 (repealed)	No. 113 of 1994	
(Repealed by Statute Law Revision (Repeals) Act 1999 (No. 3 of 1999))
Livestock Disease Control Act 1994	No. 115 of 1994	20 December 1994
An Act to provide for the monitoring and control of livestock diseases and to provide compensation for losses caused by certain livestock diseases, to repeal the Bees Act 1971, (Note: Bees Act 1971 (No. 8216)) the Cattle Compensation Act 1967, (Note: Cattle Compensation Act 1967 (No. 7615)) the Stock (Artificial Breeding) Act 1962, (Note: Stock (Artificial Breeding) Act 1962 (No. 6877)) the Stock Diseases Act 1968 (Note: Stock Diseases Act 1968 (No. 7724)) and the Swine Compensation Act 1967, (Note: Swine Compensation Act 1967 (No. 7614)) to amend the Stamps Act 1958 (Note: Stamps Act 1958 (No. 6375)) and to make consequential amendments to various Acts and for other purposes.
Melbourne City Link Authority Act 1994 (repealed)	No. 116 of 1994	20 December 1994
An Act to establish a body corporate to be known as the Melbourne City Link Authority, to amend the Borrowing and Investment Powers Act 1987 and for other purposes. (Repealed by Melbourne City Link (Miscellaneous Amendments) Act 2000 (No. 81 of 2000))
Melbourne Sports and Aquatic Centre Act 1994 or the State Sport Centres Act 1994	No. 117 of 1994	20 December 1994
An Act to establish a Melbourne Sports and Aquatic Centre Trust to administer a Melbourne Sports and Aquatic Centre, and to provide for the use of certain Albert Park land and for other purposes.
Planning Authorities Repeal Act 1994 (repealed)	No. 118 of 1994	20 December 1994
An to provide for the winding up of the Loddon-Campaspe Regional Planning Authority and the Upper Yarra Valley and Dandenong Ranges Authority, to repeal the Loddon-Campaspe Regional Planning Authority Act 1987 (Note: Loddon-Campaspe Regional Planning Authority Act 1987 (No. 59 of 1987)) and the Upper Yarra Valley and Dandenong Ranges Authority Act 1976 (Note: Upper Yarra Valley and Dandenong Ranges Authority Act 1976 (No. 8968)) and to amend the Planning and Environment Act 1987 (Note: Planning and Environment Act 1987 (No. 45 of 1987)) to provide for the continuation of the approved regional strategy plan made under the Upper Yarra Valley and Dandenong Ranges Authority Act 1976 and for other purposes. (Repealed by Legislation Reform (Repeals No. 3) Act 2008 (No. 53 of 2008))
Superannuation Acts (Further Amendment) Act 1994 (repealed)	No. 120 of 1994	
(Repealed by Statute Law Revision (Repeals) Act 1999 (No. 3 of 1999))
Water Industry Act 1994	No. 121 of 1994	20 December 1994
An Act to provide for the reform of the water industry, to amend the Melbourne and Metropolitan Board of Works Act 1958, (Note: Melbourne and Metropolitan Board of Works Act 1958 (No. 6310)) the Water Act 1989, (Note: Water Act 1989 (No. 80 of 1989)) the Melbourne Water Corporation Act 1992 (Note: Melbourne Water Corporation Act 1992 (No. 54 of 1992)) and certain other Acts and for other purposes.
Accident Compensation (Amendment) Act 1994	No. X of 1994	
Administration and Probate (Amendment) Act 1994	No. X of 1994	
Agricultural and Veterinary Chemicals (Victoria) Act 1994	No. X of 1994	
Agriculture (Registered Occupations) Act 1994 (repealed)	No. 65 of 1994	
(Repealed by Statute Law Revision (Repeals) Act 1999 (No. 3 of 1999))
Alcoholics and Drug-dependent Persons (Amendment) Act 1994 (repealed)	No. 26 of 1994	
(Repealed by Statute Law Revision (Repeals) Act 1999 (No. 3 of 1999))
Appropriation (1994-95, No. 1) Act 1994	No. X of 1994	
Appropriation (Interim 1994-95) Act 1994	No. X of 1994	
Appropriation (Parliament 1994-95, No. 1) Act 1994	No. X of 1994	
Arts Institutions (Amendment) Act 1994 (repealed)	No. 29 of 1994	
(Repealed by Statute Law (Further Revision) Act 2006 (No. 29 of 2006))
Audit Act 1994	No. X of 1994	
Borrowing and Investment Powers (Public Transport Corporation) Act 1994 (repealed)	No. 85 of 1994	
(Repealed by Statute Law Revision (Repeals) Act 1999 (No. 3 of 1999))
Business Franchise Acts (Amendment) Act 1994 (repealed)	No. 80 of 1994	
(Repealed by Statute Law Revision (Repeals) Act 1999 (No. 3 of 1999))
Casino (Management Agreement) (Amendment) Act 1994 (repealed)	No. 93 of 1994	
(Repealed by Statute Law Revision (Repeals) Act 1999 (No. 3 of 1999))
Constitution (Amendment) Act 1994	No. X of 1994	
Constitution (Court of Appeal) Act 1994	No. X of 1994	
Corrections (Amendment) Act 1994 (repealed)	No. 94 of 1994	
(Repealed by Statute Law Revision (Repeals) Act 1999 (No. 3 of 1999))
Crimes (Amendment) Act 1994 (repealed)	No. 95 of 1994	
(Repealed by Statute Law Revision (Repeals) Act 1999 (No. 3 of 1999))
Crown Lands Acts (Amendment) Act 1994 (repealed)	No. 96 of 1994	
(Repealed by Legislation Reform (Repeals No. 2) Act 2008 (No. 16 of 2008))
Dentists (Amendment) Act 1994 (repealed)	No. 69 of 1994	
(Repealed by Statute Law Revision (Repeals) Act 1999 (No. 3 of 1999))
Drugs, Poisons and Controlled Substances (Amendment) Act 1994	No. X of 1994	
Economic Development (Repeal) Act 1994	No. X of 1994	
Electricity Industry (Amendment) Act 1994	No. X of 1994	
Electricity Industry (Further Amendment) Act 1994	No. X of 1994	
Emergency Management (Amendment) Act 1994 (repealed)	No. 97 of 1994	
(Repealed by Statute Law Revision (Repeals) Act 1999 (No. 3 of 1999))
Employee Relations (Amendment) Act 1994 (repealed)	No. 82 of 1994	
(Repealed by Legislation Reform (Repeals No. 3) Act 2008 (No. 53 of 2008))
Environment Protection (General Amendment) Act 1994 (repealed)	No. 20 of 1994	
(Repealed by Statute Law Revision (Repeals) Act 1999 (No. 3 of 1999))
Estate Agents (Amendment) Act 1994 (repealed)	No. 86 of 1994	
(Repealed by Legislation Reform (Repeals No. 2) Act 2008 (No. 16 of 2008))
Financial Agreement Act 1994	No. X of 1994	
Financial Institutions (Victoria) (Amendment) Act 1994 (repealed)	No. 54 of 1994	
(Repealed by Statute Law Revision (Repeals) Act 1999 (No. 3 of 1999))
Fisheries (Amendment) Act 1994 (repealed)	No. 87 of 1994	
(Repealed by Statute Law Revision (Repeals) Act 1999 (No. 3 of 1999))
Friendly Societies (Benefit Funds) Act 1994 (repealed)	No. 22 of 1994	
(Repealed by Statute Law Revision (Repeals) Act 1999 (No. 3 of 1999))
Gaming and Betting (Amendment) Act 1994 (repealed)	No. 98 of 1994	
(Repealed by Statute Law (Further Revision) Act 2006 (No. 29 of 2006))
Health Services (Amendment) Act 1994 (repealed)	No. 88 of 1994	
(Repealed by Statute Law Revision (Repeals) Act 1999 (No. 3 of 1999))
Impounding of Livestock Act 1994	No. X of 1994	
Intellectually Disabled Persons' Services (Amendment) Act 1994	No. X of 1994	
Land (Further Miscellaneous Matters) Act 1994	No. X of 1994	
Land (Miscellaneous Matters) and National Tennis Centre (Amendment) Act 1994	No. X of 1994	
Land (Revocation of Reservations) Act 1994	No. X of 1994	
Land Titles Validation Act 1994	No. X of 1994	
Liquor Control (Amendment) Act 1994	No. X of 1994	
Local Government (Amendment) Act 1994 (repealed)	No. 99 of 1994	
(Repealed by Legislation Reform (Repeals No. 1) Act 2008 (No. 10 of 2008))
Local Government (Competitive Tendering) Act 1994	No. X of 1994	
Lotteries Gaming and Betting (Betting) Act 1994 (repealed)	No. 77 of 1994	
(Repealed by Statute Law Revision (Repeals) Act 1999 (No. 3 of 1999))
Lotteries Gaming and Betting (General Amendment) Act 1994	No. X of 1994	
Magistrates' Court (Amendment) Act 1994	No. X of 1994	
Melbourne Water Corporation (Amendment) Act 1994 (repealed)	No. 56 of 1994	
(Repealed by Statute Law Revision (Repeals) Act 1999 (No. 3 of 1999))
Mineral Resources Development (Further Amendment) Act 1994 (repealed)	No. 7 of 1994	
(Repealed by Statute Law Revision (Repeals) Act 1999 (No. 3 of 1999))
National Crime Authority (State Provisions) (Amendment) Act 1994 (repealed)	No. 27 of 1994	
(Repealed by Statute Law Revision (Repeals) Act 1999 (No. 3 of 1999))
Petroleum (Amendment) Act 1994 (repealed)	No. 8 of 1994	
(Repealed by Statute Law Revision (Repeals) Act 1999 (No. 3 of 1999))
Property Law (Amendment) Act 1994 (repealed)	No. 71 of 1994	
(Repealed by Statute Law Revision (Repeals) Act 1999 (No. 3 of 1999))
Road Safety (Amendment) Act 1994	No. X of 1994	
Road Safety (Further Amendment) Act 1994 (repealed)	No. 78 of 1994	
(Repealed by Statute Law Revision (Repeals) Act 1999 (No. 3 of 1999))
Royal Agricultural Show-grounds (Amendment) Act 1994 (repealed)	No. 72 of 1994	
(Repealed by Statute Law Revision (Repeals) Act 1999 (No. 3 of 1999))
Sentencing (Victim Impact Statement) Act 1994 (repealed)	No. 24 of 1994	
(Repealed by Statute Law Revision (Repeals) Act 1999 (No. 3 of 1999))
Stamps (Securities Clearing House) Act 1994	No. X of 1994	
State Taxation (Amendment) Act 1994	No. X of 1994	
State Trustees (State Owned Company) Act 1994	No. X of 1994	
Superannuation Acts (Amendment) Act 1994 (repealed)	No. 58 of 1994	
(Repealed by Statute Law Revision (Repeals) Act 1999 (No. 3 of 1999))
Tertiary Education (Amendment) Act 1994 (repealed)	No. 59 of 1994	
(Repealed by Statute Law Revision (Repeals) Act 1999 (No. 3 of 1999))
Tobacco Leaf Industry (Deregulation) Act 1994	No. X of 1994	
Transport (Further Amendment) Act 1994	No. X of 1994	
Transport Accident (General Amendment) Act 1994	No. X of 1994	
Valuation of Land (Amendment) Act 1994 (repealed)	No. 91 of 1994	
(Repealed by Legislation Reform (Repeals No. 2) Act 2008 (No. 16 of 2008))
Victorian Institute of Marine Sciences (Amendment) Act 1994	No. X of 1994	
Victorian Plantations Corporation (Amendment) Act 1994 (repealed)	No. 92 of 1994	
(Repealed by Statute Law Revision Act 2013 (No. 70 of 2013)
Vocational Education and Training (Amendment) Act 1994	No. X of 1994	
Water (Further Amendment) Act 1994 (repealed)	No. 49 of 1994	
(Repealed by Legislation Reform (Repeals No. 2) Act 2008 (No. 16 of 2008))
Witness Protection (Amendment) Act 1994 (repealed)	No. 28 of 1994	
(Repealed by Statute Law Revision (Repeals) Act 1999 (No. 3 of 1999))

== Sources ==
- "1994 Victorian Historical Acts". AustLII.
