= The Crooked House =

Former pub in Staffordshire, England

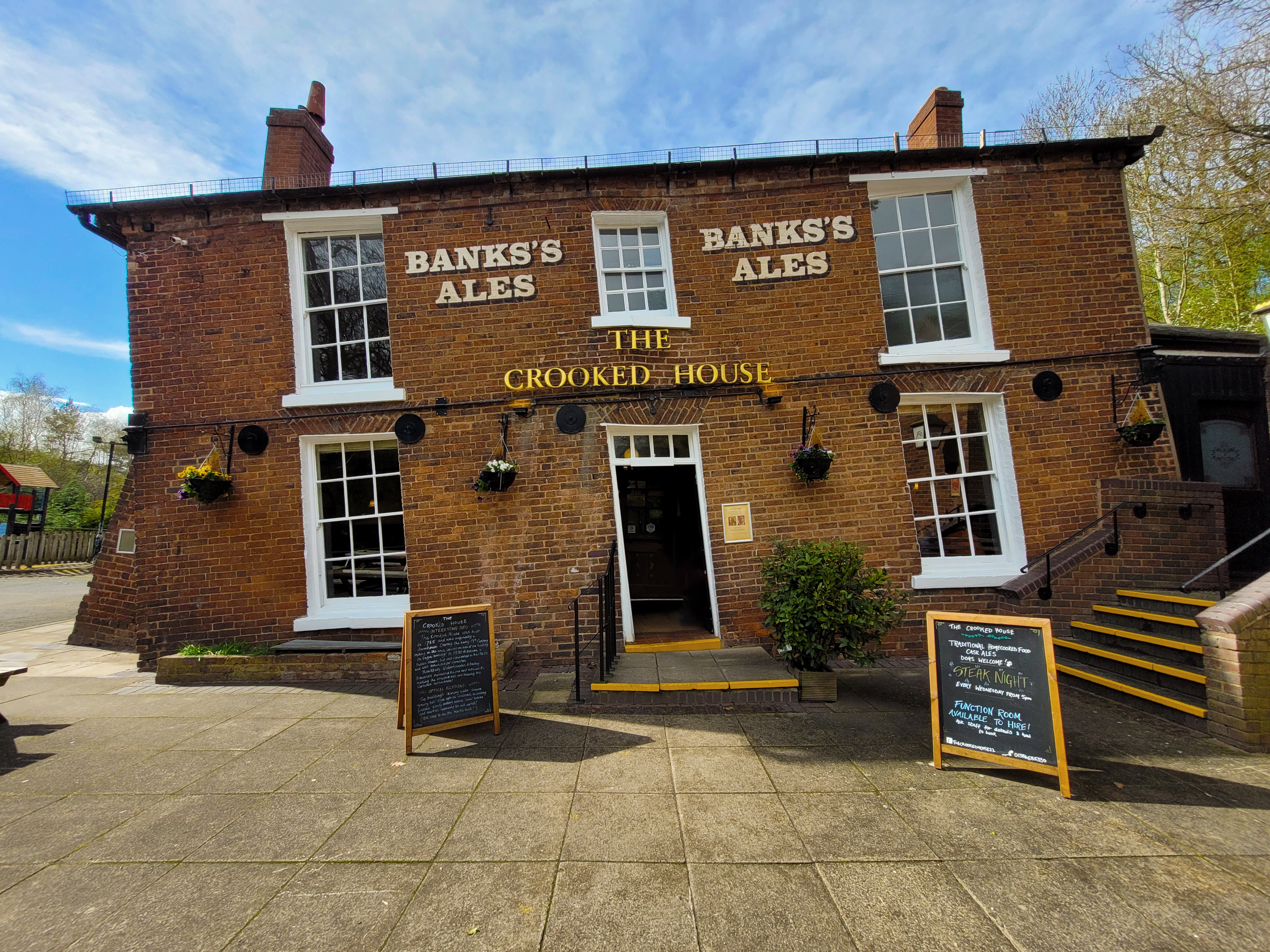
- The Crooked House (April 2023)
- Former names: Glynne Arms

General information
- Type: Pub
- Location: Coppice Mill, Himley, Staffordshire, DY3 4DA
- Coordinates: 52.5151°N 2.1524°W
- Completed: 1765
- Opened: c. 1830 (as pub)
- Closed: 2023
- Demolished: 7 August 2023

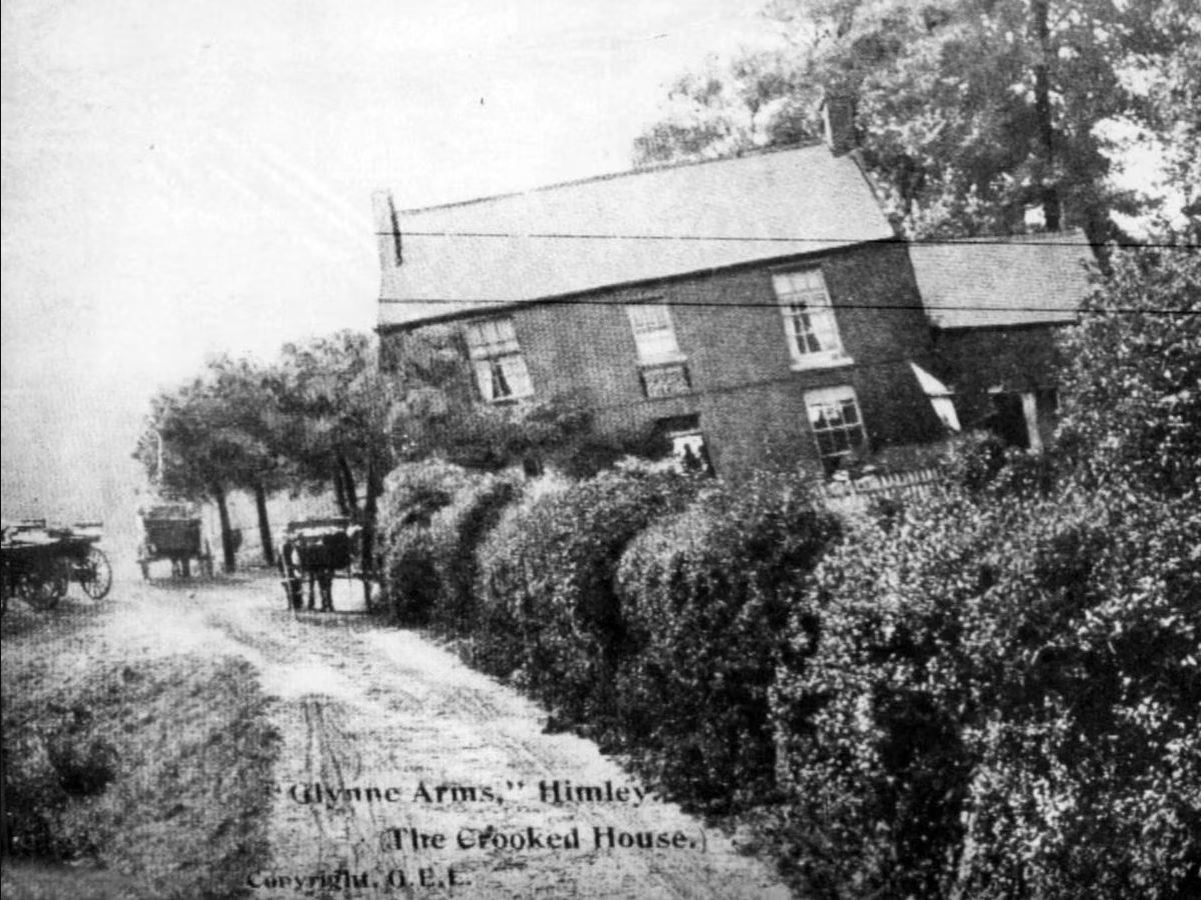
A 1904 postcard of the building

The Crooked House was a pub in South Staffordshire, England. Its name and distinctive appearance were the result of 19th-century mining subsidence which caused one side of the building to be approximately 4 feet (1.2 m) lower than the other. It was known as "Britain's wonkiest pub", and optical illusions inside the building made objects appear to roll uphill.

Located in Himley in England's Black Country, the building was originally an 18th-century millhouse before it was converted into a pub in the 1830s. In July 2023, the pub closed and was sold. The following month, the building was gutted in a fire and the new owners demolished it against the instructions of South Staffordshire Council. Criminal charges of arson with intent to endanger life have been brought against multiple people, and the landowner has been issued with an enforcement notice which requires them to reconstruct the building. The landowner lodged an appeal against the order, and their offer to relocate the pub has been opposed by campaigners.

== Optical illusions ==
The building's leaning walls gave rise to optical illusions, as with a gravity hill. These included objects seemingly rolling uphill along the pub's dado rails and bottles appearing to roll upwards along tables. Furniture and fixtures appeared not to hang plumb, including the grandfather clock (which was mounted on a tapered plinth) and the chandelier. In 1975, the landlord claimed that the novelty of the pub brought visitors from as far afield as China, Russia, Japan, the United States, and Canada.

== History ==
=== Origins ===
Built in 1765, the building was originally a corn mill – Coppice Mill – on Oak Farm on the Glynne estate in Himley, Staffordshire. (Note: When built, the building and its environs were located entirely within the county of Staffordshire, but the establishment of the county of West Midlands in 1974 resulted in some of the pub's property being located across the county border) The building was turned into a pub in c. 1830 and was originally named the Glynne Arms. Around this time, coal mines were established in the Black Country, and the Earl of Dudley owned the substantial Himley colliery in the area surrounding the pub.

In the 1850s the building began gradually sinking until one end of the building was 4 feet (1.2 m) lower than the other, leaning at an angle of 15 degrees. The subsidence is often attributed to mining near the building, although it is likely that the mill race had caused softening of the surrounding ground. The subsidence led the pub to become known locally as the "Siden House" ("siden" meaning "crooked" in the Black Country dialect). In 2002 the pub was officially renamed the Crooked House, which had been its long-standing colloquial name.

Although strengthened by buttresses by 1904, the building was condemned as unsafe in the 1940s and was scheduled for demolition. (Note: In a 1975 interview, Mrs Love (who ran the pub with her husband Arthur) stated that it was condemned in 1950; other sources give the date as "the 1940s") Wolverhampton and Dudley Breweries purchased the pub and in 1957 made the structure safe using steel tie rods and strengthening the buttresses, investing £10,000 (equivalent to £210,000 in 2025) in doing so.

In 1986 the pub was damaged by a fire which affected the first floor and the roof. The following year the brewery spent £360,000 (equivalent to £1,040,000 in 2025) on renovations.

=== 2023 sale ===
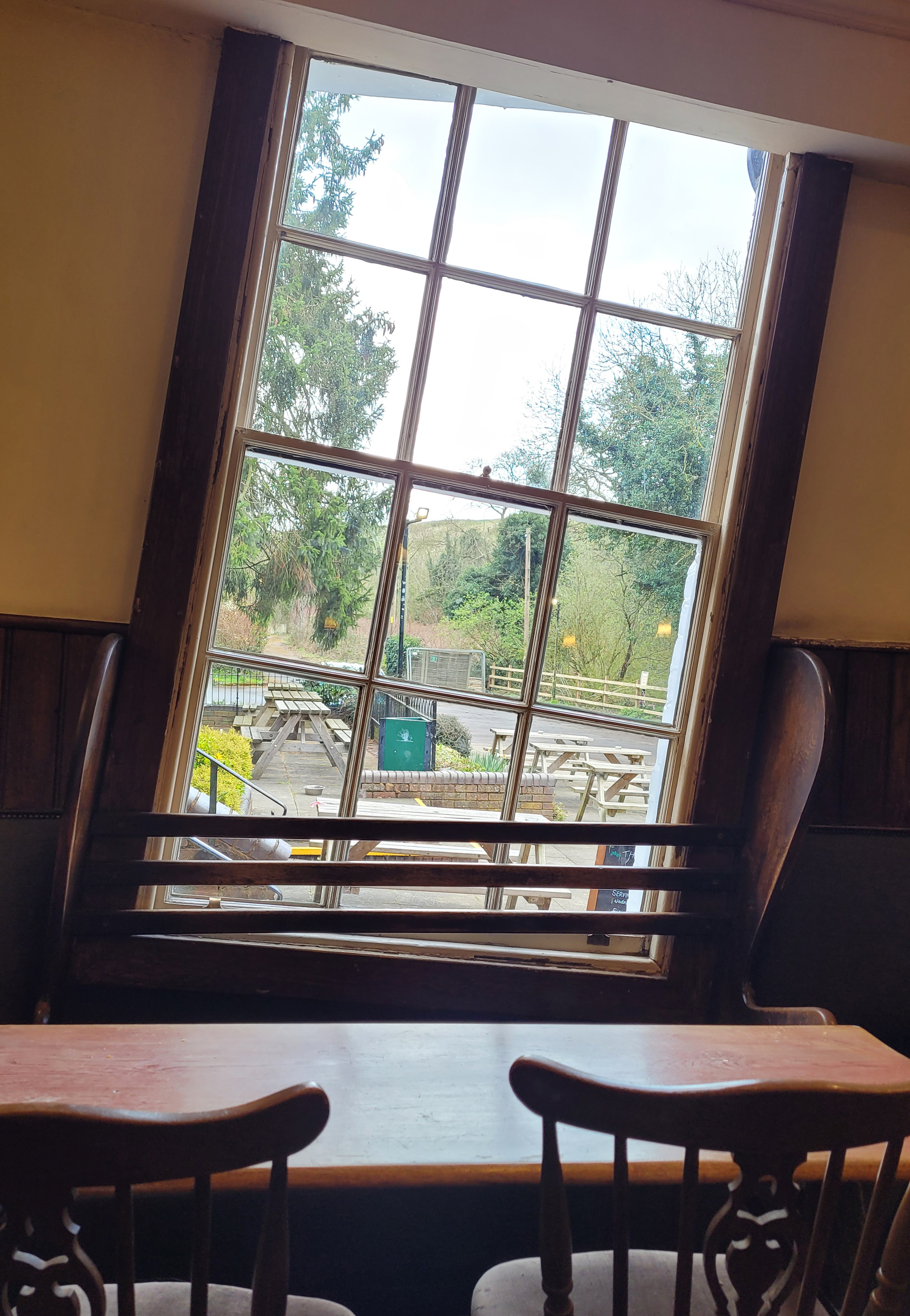
View from interior, April 2023

The building, known as "Britain's wonkiest pub", was put up for sale for £675,000 in March 2023 as a going concern. On 25 June, it was the subject of a burglary causing over £10,000 worth of damage to the bar, kitchen, and toilet areas.

In July, Historic England received a request to grant the building listed status. The Georgian Group also began to examine the suitability of the site for listed status.

The sale of the pub was completed on 27 July for an undisclosed price. It was reported that it had been sold "for alternative use" and was unlikely to reopen as a pub. The buyer was later shown to be ATE Farms Ltd, a property firm with the same registered address in Bedworth, Warwickshire, as the quarrying business adjacent to the pub as well as an equipment rental firm named AT Contracting and Plant Hire.

=== 2023 fire and demolition ===
On the evening of 5 August 2023, a fire gutted the pub's interior and destroyed part of the structure including the roof. No people were reported injured in the fire.

Crews from Staffordshire Fire and Rescue Service and the West Midlands Fire Service attended the fire after first receiving an emergency call at 21:58 BST. Access to the premises was hindered by an 8-foot (2.4 m) mound of earth blocking the only lane leading to the building, so approximately 1,000 metres (3,300 ft) of hose were used to pump water to the fire. Staffordshire Fire and Rescue Service and Staffordshire Police launched a joint investigation to ascertain the cause of the fire. South Staffordshire Council (SSC) visited the site after the fire, and discussed a plan of works with a representative of the landowner. The agreed programme included removing parts of the first floor of the pub's front elevation, to remove the risk of weakened parts of the structure falling, but council officers did not deem it necessary to have the whole structure demolished.

A police cordon was in place on the morning of 7 August while investigations were undertaken, but officers were stood down because of concerns that the building was structurally unsafe. The site was subsequently overseen by the landowner. That day, the building was demolished with an excavator hired by AT Contracting and Plant Hire. The plant hire company that supplied the excavator stated it had been on dry hire to an existing customer and that the supplier had no connection to nor foreknowledge of the pub's demolition.

=== Reactions and legal proceedings ===
Roger Lees, the leader of South Staffordshire Council, described the demolition as "completely unacceptable and contrary to instructions provided by [council] officers", and stated that the case had been passed to the council planning enforcement department to see if the demolition was lawful under the Town and Country Planning Act and the Building Act. Breaches of legislation during the demolition were referred to the Health and Safety Executive. Andy Street, the Mayor of the West Midlands, called for the pub to be rebuilt "brick by brick" and urged the Council to block any attempted change of use. Dudley North MP Marco Longhi said he was "completely devastated and angry at what had taken place".

On 9 August 2023, Staffordshire Police announced that while investigations with the fire service were still ongoing to identify the cause of the fire, they were treating the circumstances as arson. On 16 August, it was revealed that AT Contracting and Plant Hire had experienced a previous major fire in August 2018 at their landfill site in Finmere, Buckinghamshire. The cause was never established.

Members of the public formed the "Save the Crooked House (Let's Get It Re-Built)" group to campaign for the pub's rebuilding. After a spate of bricks being taken from the site and sold on social media, the group had the remaining reclaimed bricks locked in secure storage. Rebuild campaigners appealed for information to locate the pub's grandfather clock which they believe was removed from the pub before the fire and demolition.

Between August and October, Staffordshire Police arrested and bailed six people on charges including suspicion of arson with intent to endanger life.

=== Enforcement notice ===
In February 2024, South Staffordshire Council issued an enforcement notice on the landowner requiring them to reinstate the building as it was before demolition. The works are required to make use of bricks reclaimed from the site, using photographs to ensure the same bond. The landowners are required to complete the reconstruction within three years. ATE Farms Ltd lodged an appeal against the order, proposing to rebuild the pub on an alternative site nearby as the former location would "not provide a sustainable community facility". Campaigners opposed the proposed relocation.

=== Short film ===
For the third anniversary of the demolition a short film will be released.

== See also ==
- The Alchemist, a London pub demolished in 2015 and restored in 2018
- The Carlton Inn, an Australian pub demolished in 2016
- The Carlton Tavern, a London pub demolished in 2015 and rebuilt by 2021
- The Punch Bowl, Lancashire, a Lancashire pub demolished in 2021 and ordered to be reconstructed
- The Vulcan, a Cardiff pub scheduled for demolition before being relocated to a museum
