= List of acts of the Parliament of Victoria from 2023 =

This is a list of acts of the Parliament of Victoria, Australia for the year 2023.

== 2023 ==
Short title, or popular name	Citation	Royal assent
Long title
Building and Planning Legislation Amendment Act 2023	No. 1 of 2023	28 February 2023
An Act to amend the Building Act 1993, (Note: Building Act 1993 (No. 126 of 1993)) the Architects Act 1991, (Note: Architects Act 1991 (No. 13 of 1991)) the Surveying Act 2004 (Note: Surveying Act 2004 (No. 47 of 2004)) and the Planning and Environment Act 1987 (Note: Planning and Environment Act 1987 (No. 45 of 1987)) and for other purposes.
Racing Amendment (Unauthorised Access) Act 2023	No. 2 of 2023	
Local Government (Moira Shire Council) Act 2023	No. 3 of 2023	9 March 2023
An Act to dismiss the Moira Shire Council, to provide for a second general election for the Moira Shire Council, to make consequential amendments to the Local Government Act 2020 and for other purposes.
Health Legislation Amendment (Information Sharing) Act 2023	No. 4 of 2023	
Heritage Amendment Act 2023	No. 5 of 2023	
Statute Law Amendment Act 2023	No. 6 of 2023	9 May 2023
An Act to revise the statute law of Victoria, to make minor amendments to the Competition Policy Reform (Victoria) Act 1995 (Note: Competition Policy Reform (Victoria) Act 1995 (No. 74 of 1995)) and for other purposes.
Drugs, Poisons and Controlled Substances Amendment (Medically Supervised Injecting Centre) Act 2023	No. 7 of 2023	
Human Source Management Act 2023	No. 8 of 2023	16 May 2023
An Act to provide for the registration, use and management of human sources by Victoria Police, to provide for the external oversight of the use of human sources, to consequentially amend the Victoria Police Act 2013 (Note: Victoria Police Act 2013 (No. 81 of 2013)) and for other purposes.
Disability and Social Services Regulation Amendment Act 2023	No. 9 of 2023	
Water Legislation Amendment Act 2023	No. 10 of 2023	
Building Legislation Amendment Act 2023	No. 11 of 2023	
Energy Legislation Amendment (Electricity Outage Emergency Response and Other Matters) Act 2023	No. 12 of 2023	
Gambling Regulation Amendment Act 2023	No. 13 of 2023	
Gambling Taxation Act 2023	No. 14 of 2023	6 June 2023
An Act to consolidate and amend various gambling taxes, to make consequential amendments to the Casino Control Act 1991, (Note: Casino Control Act 1991 (No. 47 of 1991)) the Casino (Management Agreement) Act 1993, (Note: Casino (Management Agreement) Act 1993 (No. 94 of 1993)) the Gambling Regulation Act 2003 (Note: Gambling Regulation Act 2003 (No. 114 of 2003)) and the Taxation Administration Act 1997 (Note: Taxation Administration Act 1997 (No. 40 of 1997)) and for other purposes.
Appropriation (2023-2024) Act 2023	No. 15 of 2023	27 June 2023
An Act for the appropriation of certain sums out of the Consolidated Fund for the ordinary annual services of the Government for the financial year 2023/2024 and for other purposes.
Appropriation (Parliament 2023-2024) Act 2023	No. 16 of 2023	27 June 2023
An Act for the appropriation of certain sums out of the Consolidated Fund for the Parliament in respect of the financial year 2023/2024 and for other purposes.
Children and Health Legislation Amendment (Statement of Recognition, Aboriginal Self-determination and Other Matters) Act 2023	No. 17 of 2023	
State Taxation Acts Amendment Act 2023	No. 18 of 2023	
Victorian Future Fund Act 2023	No. 19 of 2023	27 June 2023
An Act to establish the Victorian Future Fund and set out the purposes for which money in the Victorian Future Fund may be used and to amend the Duties Act 2000 (Note: Duties Act 2000 (No. 79 of 2000)) and for other purposes.
Mental Health and Wellbeing Amendment Act 2023	No. 20 of 2023	
Drugs, Poisons and Controlled Substances Amendment (Authorising Pharmacists) Act 2023	No. 21 of 2023	
Energy Legislation Amendment (Energy Safety) Act 2023	No. 22 of 2023	
Mineral Resources (Sustainable Development) Amendment Act 2023	No. 23 of 2023	29 August 2023
An Act to amend the Mineral Resources (Sustainable Development) Act 1990 (Note: Mineral Resources Development Act 1990 (No. 92 of 1990)) to change the title of that Act and to remove requirements relating to work plans and to make consequential amendments to the Melbourne Strategic Assessment (Environment Mitigation Levy) Act 2020 (Note: Melbourne Strategic Assessment (Environment Mitigation Levy) Act 2020 (No. 1 of 2020)) and other Acts and for other purposes.
Energy Legislation Amendment Act 2023	No. 24 of 2023	
Statute Law Amendment (References to the Sovereign) Act 2023	No. 25 of 2023	5 September 2023
An Act to amend the Interpretation of Legislation Act 1984 (Note: Interpretation of Legislation Act 1984 (No. 10096)) in relation to references to the Sovereign, to amend the statute law of Victoria to revise language referring to the Queen and Her Majesty as a consequence of the death of Queen Elizabeth II and for other purposes.
Justice Legislation Amendment Act 2023	No. 26 of 2023	
Summary Offences Amendment (Nazi Salute Prohibition) Act 2023	No. 27 of 2023	
Bail Amendment Act 2023	No. 28 of 2023	
Education and Training Reform Amendment (Land Powers) Act 2023	No. 29 of 2023	
Gambling Legislation Amendment Act 2023	No. 30 of 2023	
Special Investigator Repeal Act 2023	No. 31 of 2023	8 November 2023
An Act to repeal the Special Investigator Act 2021 (Note: Special Investigator Act 2021 (No. 50 of 2021)) and to abolish the Office of the Special Investigator, to make necessary transitional arrangements, to continue in operation certain offences, to make consequential and related amendments to other Acts and for other purposes.
Triple Zero Victoria Act 2023	No. 32 of 2023	8 November 2023
An Act to establish Triple Zero Victoria, to repeal the Emergency Services Telecommunications Authority Act 2004 (Note: Emergency Services Telecommunications Authority Act 2004 (No. 98 of 2004)) and for other purposes.
Early Childhood Legislation Amendment (Premises Approval in Principle) Act 2023	No. 33 of 2023	
Transport Legislation Amendment Act 2023	No. 34 of 2023	21 November 2023
An Act to amend the Bus Safety Act 2009, (Note: Bus Safety Act 2009 (No. 13 of 2009)) the Commercial Passenger Vehicle Industry Act 2017, (Note: Commercial Passenger Vehicle Industry Act 2017 (No. 35 of 2017)) the Marine (Domestic Commercial Vessel National Law Application) Act 2013, (Note: Marine (Domestic Commercial Vessel National Law Application) Act 2013 (?)) the Road Management Act 2004, (Note: Road Management Act 2004 (No. 12 of 2004)) the Road Safety Act 1986, (Note: Road Safety Act 1986 (No. 127 of 1986)) the Sentencing Act 1991, (Note: Sentencing Act 1991 (No. 49 of 1991)) the Transport Accident Act 1986, (Note: Transport Accident Act 1986 (No. 111 of 1986)) the Transport (Compliance and Miscellaneous) Act 1983, (Note: Transport Act 1983 (No. 9921)) the Transport Integration Act 2010 (Note: Transport Integration Act 2010 (No. 6 of 2010)) and other Acts and for other purposes.
Environment Legislation Amendment (Circular Economy and Other Matters) Act 2023	No. 35 of 2023	
Corrections Amendment (Parole Reform) Act 2023	No. 36 of 2023	
Crimes Amendment (Non-fatal Strangulation) Act 2023	No. 37 of 2023	
State Taxation Acts and Other Acts Amendment Act 2023	No. 38 of 2023	12 December 2023
An Act to amend the Duties Act 2000, the Fire Services Property Levy Act 2012, (Note: Fire Services Property Levy Act 2012 (No. 58 of 2012)) the First Home Owner Grant and Home Buyer Schemes Act 2000, (Note: First Home Owner Grant Act 2000 (No. 5 of 2000)) the Land Tax Act 2005, (Note: Land Tax Act 2005 (No. 88 of 2005)) the Local Government Act 1989, (Note: Local Government Act 1989 (No. 11 of 1989)) the Property Law Act 1958, (Note: Property Law Act 1958 (No. 6344)) the Sale of Land Act 1962, (Note: Sale of Land Act 1962 (No. 6975)) the Treasury Corporation of Victoria Act 1992, (Note: Treasury Corporation of Victoria Act 1992 (No. 80 of 1992)) the Valuation of Land Act 1960 (Note: Valuation of Land Act 1960 (No. 6653)) and the Windfall Gains Tax Act 2021 (Note: Windfall Gains Tax and State Taxation and Other Acts Further Amendment Act 2021 (No. 52 of 2021)) and for other purposes.

== Sources ==
- "Acts as made: 2023". Victoria Legislation.
