= Carlton Tavern =

Pub in Kilburn, London

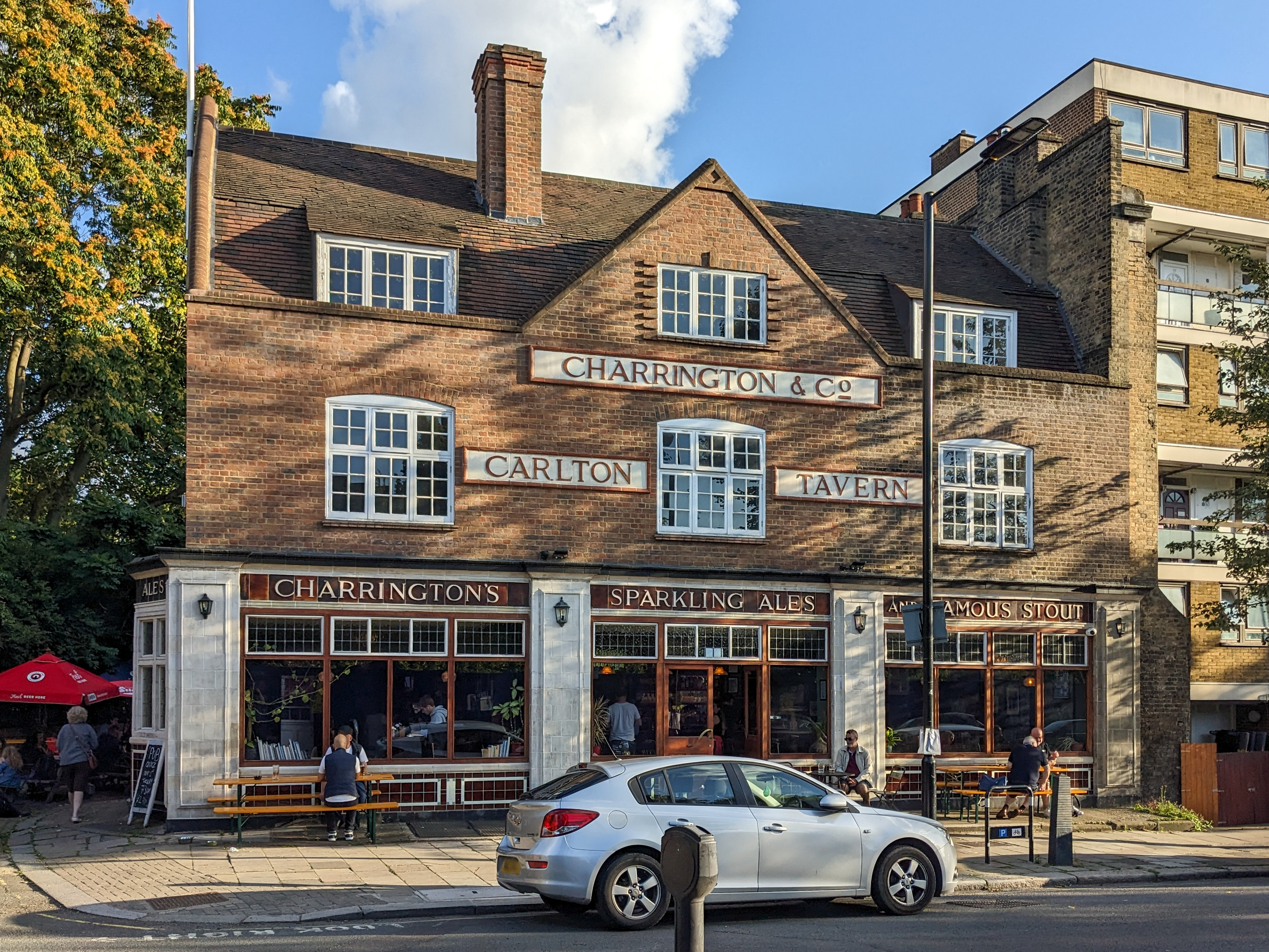
- The rebuilt Carlton Tavern in 2023

- Location within City of Westminster Location within Greater London

General information
- Location: 33 Carlton Vale, NW6 5EU, London, England
- Coordinates: 51°31′55″N 0°11′29″W
- Completed: 1921 and 2019
- Inaugurated: 1921; 12 April 2021 (reopening)
- Demolished: 8 April 2015
- Owner: Ori Calif

Design and construction
- Architect: Frank J. Potter

Website
- carltontavern.co.uk

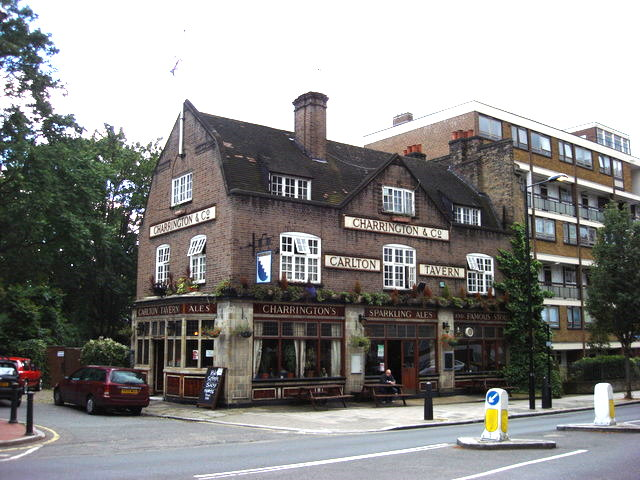
The Carlton Tavern in 2007, before demolition

The Carlton Tavern is a pub in the Kilburn neighbourhood of London, England, originally completed in 1921. It was illegally demolished in 2015 by Tel Aviv-based developer CLTX, after it failed to obtain the necessary planning permission. Westminster City Council subsequently ordered the pub to be rebuilt. It reopened on 12 April 2021. The pub was the only building in the street to survive the Blitz during World War II.

== Building ==
The Carlton Tavern stands on Carlton Vale, just north of Paddington Recreation Ground, and just to the south of St. Augustine's church. It was built in 1920–21 for Charrington Brewery to a design by the architect Frank J. Potter. It replaced an earlier pub on the same site that was destroyed by a German bomb from the major Gotha Raids air raid of 19/20 May 1918. The building was noted for its unaltered 1920s interiors and faience tiled exterior. It is the only building in the street to survive the Blitz during World War II. It was owned by Punch Taverns until at least June 2008, when Punch was unsuccessful in its application to have opening hours extended "until the early hours of the morning".

A spokesman for Historic England said "The site was remarkably well-preserved externally and internally. It displayed the hierarchy of rooms in their fixtures, fittings and decorative treatment and retained all its external signage. Few pubs were built at this date and fewer survive unaltered".

== Demolition ==
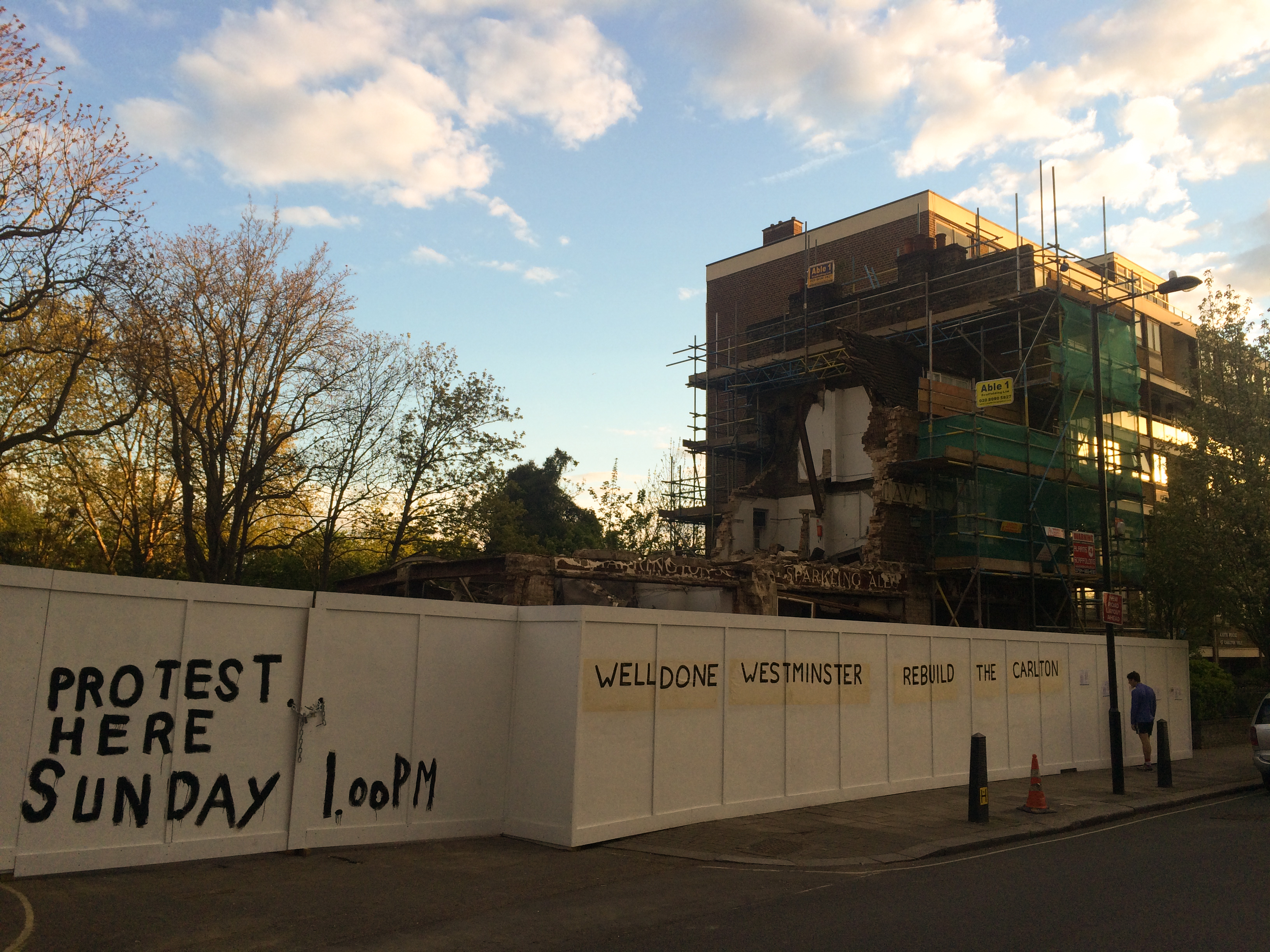
Site of the demolished pub in April 2015, with protest graffiti

The building was being considered by Historic England for Grade II listing when it was unexpectedly demolished on 8 April 2015 by its owner, Israeli property developer CLTX Limited, to make way for a block of flats above a new pub. The manager was told by the owner on Easter Monday to close the pub for an "inventory", but when she returned two days later she found the building had been demolished. According to Haaretz, CLTX is "a relatively unknown company with only one listed director – Tel Aviv lawyer Ori Calif".

Historic England had surveyed the pub, making records of the layout, tiles and other original details so that full architectural information was available. Listing as a Grade II building was going to be announced a few days after its unexpected destruction.

== Rebuilding ==
On 5 May 2015, Westminster City Council issued an "unprecedented" enforcement notice ordering CLTX to "recreate in facsimile the building as it stood immediately prior to its demolition". The notice prevented CLTX from selling the site until the pub had been rebuilt. The London Evening Standard reported that CLTX would have to rebuild the pub "brick by brick".

CLTX was ordered to rebuild the pub within 18 months from the date it was demolished, 8 April 2015. Councillor Jan Prendergast called the demolition "the lawless destruction of Westminster's heritage". Councillor Robert Davis, deputy leader, said "Westminster is home to the West End – not the Wild West".

CLTX appealed against both the refusal of planning permission for its proposed replacement flats (with ground floor bar) and the order to rebuild the pub "brick by brick". A public inquiry held by the Planning Inspectorate sat to consider both appeals in May 2016. It rejected both appeals, but extended the time allowed for rebuilding to 24 months.

In October 2016, it was reported that CLTX had met with Westminster City Council to discuss rebuilding the pub. In March 2017, surveys of the site were being carried out, and notices on the site announced that the rebuilding process had commenced.

In October 2017, CLTX submitted a further planning application to include three flats within the pub when rebuilt. This was declined, as it was considered to go against the decision of the planning inquiry. It was also noted that CLTX had restructured and no longer had any UK-based directors.

By April 2019, most of the pub's missing exterior had been rebuilt. In late February 2020, the pub had still not reopened, and Westminster City Council was once again considering taking action against its owners.

On 12 April 2021, the pub reopened with the lifting of COVID restrictions.

== See also ==
- The Alchemist, Battersea
- Carlton Inn, illegally demolished in Melbourne, Australia
- Punch Bowl, Lancashire in Hurst Green, Lancashire
- The Crooked House
- Battle of Britain, illegally demolished in Northfleet, Kent, England
