= Punch Bowl, Lancashire =

Former pub in Hurst Green, Lancashire, England

Coordinates: 53°50′09.7″N 2°29′49.0″W

The Punch Bowl
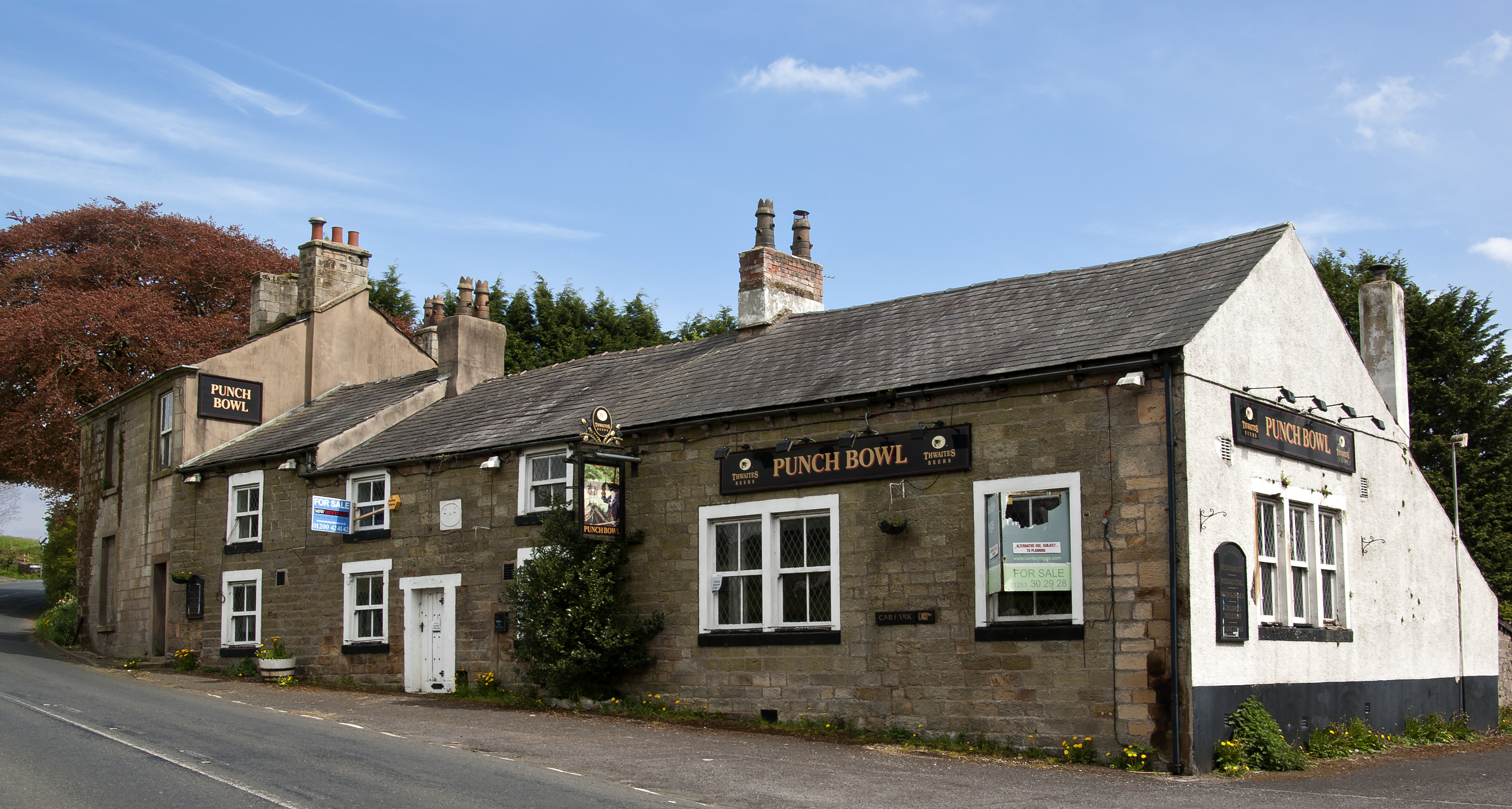
- The Punch Bowl in 2015

General information
- Type: Pub
- Completed: 18th-century
- Closed: 2012
- Demolished: 16 June 2021

The Punch Bowl Inn was an 18th-century Grade II-listed public house in Hurst Green, Ribble Valley, Lancashire, England. It consisted of a number of independent buildings, including what were originally two cottages and a barn, and a 19th-century extension. The pub was reputed to be haunted by the ghost of a highwayman. The pub closed in 2012 and afterwards stood empty. It was demolished in June 2021 without the required planning permission and an investigation followed, leading Ribble Valley Council to instruct the owners to rebuild it.

== History ==
The oldest part of the structure dated to the 18th century. According to local legend, the inn was built in the 1720s and was visited by the highwaymen Dick Turpin and Ned King in 1738. Turpin and King are said to have stayed for three days, after which Turpin travelled on to York while King attacked travellers on the local roads, assisted by landlord Jonathan Brisco. King was executed in 1741 and his ghost was said to haunt the pub. Historic England, who granted the structure protection as a Grade II listed building, notes that there was a plaque marked "1793" on the oldest portion of the structure.

The inn was originally two cottages which later formed the central portion of the structure. The eastern portion was added in the 19th century and the western portion was originally a barn. The walls of the two-bay, two-storey 18th-century portion were of sandstone laid in watershot pattern (courses angled slightly outwards to shed water) and the roof was of slate. This part of the structure had two chimney stacks and two plain stone door surrounds, one of which was blocked up. The windows were of the sash type in plain stone surrounds.

The western portion of the structure was of one storey with two sash windows. The original building was joined to the 19th-century eastern addition by a two-storey single bay structure which appeared to be of similar construction to the 18th-century part, with sash windows and plain stone surrounds. At the easternmost end of this bay (adjacent to the 19th-century portion) was a blocked-up doorway. The 19th-century addition was made of larger sandstone blocks than the rest and had a moulded stone cornice. It was of two bays and two storeys. This part of the building again had windows with plain stone surrounds; those in the easternmost bay were blank windows, those in the westernmost bay were sash-type glazed windows. There was a door in the westernmost bay. The eastern elevation of the 19th-century addition was of two bays with each floor having two sash windows; the first floor had an additional central modern window.

A public house has operated from the building since before 1844, when it was known as the Fenton Arms. The name was in honour of Joseph Fenton who purchased several manors in the area in 1831. By 1910 the pub was known as the Punch Bowl Inn and it retained this name until it closed in 2012.

== Later events ==
After closure of the pub the building stood empty, attracting vandalism and falling into disrepair; lead flashing was also stolen from its roof. Member of Parliament for the Ribble Valley Nigel Evans, in whose constituency the building was located, said: "It's quite miserable every time I drive past it to see what was a very popular pub in such a state". The building was put up for sale in 2013 with a £375,000 asking price and again in March 2015 with a £325,000 asking price.

The site was acquired by Donelan Trading Ltd who sought planning permission for a 20-unit static caravan site, which was refused. In October 2018, they were granted permission to construct a 15-unit site and to convert the building into five holiday cottages and a café. They were permitted to demolish a limited part of the structure and to erect new extensions. By this time the building's condition had deteriorated such that parts of its interior were inaccessible. Donelan Trading was refused permission to remove the existing roof of the building to facilitate repairs to the stonework as it was deemed that it would require "removal of important historic fabric".

Despite lacking any planning consent the building was demolished on 16 June 2021. Historic England said: "We are saddened to hear reports that the Grade II listed Punch Bowl Inn has been demolished without consent, and we will be investigating this with our regional partners. All listed sites are of national importance and are protected by law". Ribble Valley Council launched an investigation of the demolition and Evans has supported this.

In April 2022 Ribble Valley Council ordered that the Punch Bowl had to be rebuilt to its original plan based on architecture records. On 5 December 2022, five people—Andrew Donelan, Nicola Donelan, Rebecca Donelan, David Cotterell and Brian Ingleby—were found guilty at Burnley Magistrates Court of illegally demolishing the structure. The group were due to be sentenced at Burnley Magistrates Court on 24 January but the hearing was adjourned until 8 March. At sentencing, the group were required to pay a combined £70,000 in fines and court costs.

In March 2024 the deadline for the owners to rebuild the property, to its original plan, passed. Councillor Stephen Atkinson, however, said the council was "determined" it would be rebuilt "as soon as possible". The council commenced legal proceedings in the High Court in August 2025, seeking an injunction requiring Donelan Trading Limited, Andrew Donelan and Nicola Donelan to comply with the listed building enforcement notice to rebuild the pub.

== See also ==
- The Alchemist, a London pub demolished in 2015 and restored in 2018
- The Carlton Tavern, a London pub demolished in 2015 and rebuilt by 2021
- The Crooked House, a Staffordshire pub demolished in 2023 and ordered to be rebuilt
- Battle of Britain, illegally demolished in Northfleet, Kent, England, council refused to list as community asset and never rebuilt; now a care home
