= List of acts of the Parliament of Victoria from 1987 =

This is a list of acts of the Parliament of Victoria, Australia for the year 1987.

== 1987 ==
Short title, or popular name	Citation	Royal assent
Long title
Coal Mines (Amendment) Act 1987	No. 6 of 1987	28 April 1987
An Act to amend the Coal Mines Act 1958, (Note: Coal Mines Act 1958 (No. 6221)) to repeal the State Coal Mines (Winding Up) Act 1968 (Note: State Coal Mines (Winding Up) Act 1968 (No. 7715)) and the State Coal Mine Industrial Tribunal Act 1932 (Note: State Coal Mine Industrial Tribunal Act 1932 (No. 4030)) and for other purposes.
Shop Trading Act 1987 (repealed)	No. 10 of 1987	28 April 1987
An Act to provide for the regulation of shop trading, to make consequential amendments to certain Acts and for other purposes. (Repealed by Shop Trading Reform Act 1996 (No. 38 of 1996))
Animal Preparations Act 1987	No. 12 of 1987	5 May 1987
An Act to re-enact, with amendments, the law relating to the registration of animal preparations and the regulation of their sale and use, to repeal the Stock Foods Act 1958, (Note: Stock Foods Act 1958 (No. 6383)) the Stock Medicines Act 1958 (Note: Stock Medicines Act 1958 (No. 6384)) and the Sheep Branding Fluids Act 1963, (Note: Sheep Branding Fluids Act 1963 (No. 7001)) to amend the Agricultural Chemicals Act 1958 (Note: Fungicides Act 1958 (No. 6257)) and certain other Acts and for other purposes.
Borrowing and Investment Powers Act 1987	No. 13 of 1987	12 May 1987
An Act to make provision for borrowing and investment powers for certain statutory bodies and for other purposes.
Chattel Securities Act 1987	No. 15 of 1987	12 May 1987
An Act relating to chattel securities, to repeal the Chattel Securities Act 1981 (Note: Chattel Securities Act 1981 (No. 9650)) and for other purposes.
Companies and Securities Legislation (Miscellaneous Amendments) Act 1987 (repealed)	No. 18 of 1987	12 May 1987
An Act to amend the National Companies and Securities Commission (State Provisions) Act 1981, (Note: National Companies and Securities Commission (State Provisions) Act 1981 (No. 9572)) the Securities Industry (Application of Laws) Act 1981, (Note: Securities Industry (Application of Laws) Act 1981 (No. 9562)) the Companies (Acquisition of Shares) (Application of Laws) Act 1981 (Note: Companies (Acquisition of Shares) (Application of Laws) Act 1981 (No. 9564)) and the Futures Industry (Application of Laws) Act 1986 (Note: Futures Industry (Application of Laws) Act 1986 (No. 56 of 1986)) and for other purposes. (Repealed by Statute Law Revision (Repeals) Act 1999 (No. 3 of 1999))
Crimes (Family Violence) Act 1987 (repealed)	No. 19 of 1987	12 May 1987
An Act to provide for intervention orders in cases of family violence and to make amendments to the Crimes Act 1958 (Note: Crimes Act 1958 (No. 6231)) and for other purposes. (Repealed by Family Violence Protection Act 2008] (No. 52 of 2008))
Health Services (Conciliation and Review) Act 1987	No. 25 of 1987	12 May 1987
An Act to provide for an independent and accessible review mechanism for users of health services and for other purposes.
Industrial Relations (Miscellaneous Amendments) Act 1987 (repealed)	No. 28 of 1987	12 May 1987
An Act to amend the Industrial Relations Act 1979 (Note: Industrial Relations Act 1979 (No. 9365)) and for other purposes. (Repealed by Statute Law Revision (Repeals) Act 1999 (No. 3 of 1999))
Post-Secondary Education (Amendment) Act 1987 (repealed)	No. 33 of 1987	12 May 1987
An Act to amend the Post-Secondary Education Act 1978 (Note: Post-Secondary Education Act 1978 (No. 9145)) to constitute the Victorian Post-Secondary Education Accreditation Board and for other purposes. (Repealed by Statute Law Revision (Repeals) Act 1999 (No. 3 of 1999))
Supply (1987-88, No. 1) Act 1987 (repealed)	No. 36 of 1987	12 May 1987
An Act to make interim provision for the appropriation of moneys out of the Consolidated Fund for the recurrent services and for certain works and purposes for the financial year 1987-88. (Repealed by Statute Law Revision (Repeals) Act 1999 (No. 3 of 1999))
Works and Services (Ancillary Provisions, No. 1) Act 1987 (repealed)	No. 40 of 1987	12 May 1987
An Act to make ancillary provisions for certain works and purposes for the financial year 1987-88. (Repealed by Statute Law Revision (Repeals) Act 1999 (No. 3 of 1999))
Conservation, Forests and Lands Act 1987	No. 41 of 1987	19 May 1987
An Act to create a body corporate called the Director-General of Conservation, Forests and Lands, to abolish various bodies and transfer their functions to that body corporate, to provide for the administration and enforcement of Acts administered by the Minister for Conservation, Forests and Lands and for other matters concerning land management to make consequential amendments to various Acts and for other purposes.
House Contracts Guarantee Act 1987	No. 44 of 1987	19 May 1987
An Act to make fresh provision concerning the guarantees required to be given in relation to domestic building work, to specify requirements to be complied with in relation to domestic building work contracts, to repeal Division 1A of Part XLIX of the Local Government Act 1958 (Note: Local Government Act 1958 (No. 6299)) and the Building Contracts (Deposits) Act 1962, (Note: Building Contracts (Deposits) Act 1962 (No. 6973)) to amend the Sale of Land Act 1962 (Note: Sale of Land Act 1962 (No. 6975)) and the Building Control Act 1981 (Note: Building Control Act 1981 (No. 9720)) and for other purposes.
Planning and Environment Act 1987	No. 45 of 1987	27 May 1987
An Act to establish a framework for planning the use and development of land in Victoria and for other purposes.
BLF (De-recognition) (Amendment) Act 1987 (Note: BLF is a reference to the Builders Labourers' Federation.) (repealed)	No. 53 of 1987	14 October 1987
An Act to amend the BLF (De-recognition) Act 1985 (Note: BLF (De-recognition) Act 1985 (No. 10188)) and for other purposes. (Repealed by Statute Law Revision Act 1995 (No. 11 of 1995))
Litter Act 1987	No. 54 of 1987	20 October 1987
An Act to make provision with respect to litter, to repeal the Litter Act 1964 (Note: Litter Act 1964 (No. 7145)) and for other purposes.
Victoria State Emergency Service Act 1987 (repealed)	No. 57 of 1987	27 October 1987
An Act to reconstitute the Victoria State Emergency Service and for other purposes. (Repealed by Victoria State Emergency Service Act 2005 (No. 51 of 2005))
Loddon-Campaspe Regional Planning Authority Act 1987 (repealed)	No. 59 of 1987	27 October 1987
An Act to facilitate the planning of the Loddon–Campaspe region and to reconstitute the Loddon-Campaspe Regional Planning Authority, and for other purposes. (Repealed by Planning Authorities Repeal Act 1994 (No. 118 of 1994))
Appropriation (1987-88, No. 1) Act 1987 (repealed)	No. 61 of 1987	30 October 1987
(Repealed by Statute Law Revision (Repeals) Act 1999 (No. 3 of 1999))
Works and Services (Ancillary Provisions No. 2) Act 1987 (repealed)	No. 62 of 1987	30 October 1987
An Act to make ancillary provisions for certain works and purposes for the financial year 1987-88. (Repealed by Statute Law Revision (Repeals) Act 1999 (No. 3 of 1999))
Melbourne Lands Act 1987	No. 77 of 1987	24 November 1987
An Act to revoke the permanent reservations and Crown grants of certain lands and for other purposes.
Shop Trading (Amendment) Act 1987 (repealed)	No. 79 of 1987	24 November 1987
An Act to amend the Shop Trading Act 1987 (Note: Shop Trading Act 1987 (No. 10 of 1987)) and for other purposes. (Repealed by Statute Law Revision Act 1995 (No. 11 of 1995))
Tobacco Act 1987	No. 81 of 1987	24 November 1987
An Act to provide for the regulation of the sale and promotion of tobacco products and for other purposes.
Abattoir and Meat Inspection (Arrangements) Act 1987	No. 82 of 1987	1 December 1987
An Act to provide for the reference of certain matters relating to meat inspection to the Parliament of the Commonwealth, to make consequential amendments to certain Acts and for other purposes.
Lotteries Gaming and Betting (Amendment) Act 1987 (repealed)	No. 88 of 1987	1 December 1987
An Act to amend the Lotteries Gaming and Betting Act 1966, (Note: Lotteries Gaming and Betting Act 1966 (No. 7429)) the Tattersall Consultations Act 1958, (Note: Tattersall Consultations Act 1958 (No. 6390)) and the Lotteries Gaming and Betting (Amusement Machines) Act 1986 (Note: Lotteries Gaming and Betting (Amusement Machines) Act 1986 (No. 34 of 1986)) and for other purposes. (Repealed by Statute Law Revision Act 1995 (No. 11 of 1995))
Teaching Service (Amendment) Act 1987 (repealed)	No. 94 of 1987	1 December 1987
An Act to give the Industrial Relations Commission jurisdiction over the terms and conditions of staff employed in the teaching service and the technical and further education teaching service, to amend the Teaching Service Act 1981, (Note: Education Service Act 1981 (No. 9714)) the Post-Secondary Education Act 1978, the Teaching Service Act 1983, (Note: Teaching Service Act 1983 (No. 10029)) the Teaching Service (Amendment) Act 1984, (Note: Teaching Service (Amendment) Act 1984 (No. 10065)) and the Industrial Relations Act 1979 and for other purposes. (Repealed by Legislation Reform (Repeals No. 2) Act 2008 (No. 16 of 2008))
Liquor Control Act 1987 (repealed)	No. 97 of 1987	1 December 1987
An Act relating to the sale, disposal and consumption of liquor and for other purposes. (Repealed by Liquor Control Reform Act 1998 (No. 94 of 1998))
Accident Compensation (Amendment) Act 1987	No. X of 1987	
Adoption (Amendment) Act 1987	No. X of 1987	
Agricultural Acts (Amendment) Act 1987	No. X of 1987	
Agricultural Acts (Further Amendment) Act 1987	No. X of 1987	
Anzac Day (Amendment) Act 1987	No. X of 1987	
Associations Incorporation and Business Names (Amendment) Act 1987	No. X of 1987	
Business Franchise Acts (Amendment) Act 1987	No. X of 1987	
Chiropractors and Osteopaths (Amendment) Act 1987	No. X of 1987	
Co-operation (Amendment) Act 1987	No. X of 1987	
Community Services Act 1987	No. X of 1987	
Courts (Amendment) Act 1987	No. X of 1987	
Crimes (Amendment) Act 1987	No. X of 1987	
Dairy Industry (Amendment) Act 1987	No. X of 1987	
Drugs, Poisons and Controlled Substances (Amendment) Act 1987	No. X of 1987	
Education Acts (Amendment) Act 1987	No. X of 1987	
Environment Protection (Amendment) Act 1987	No. X of 1987	
Equal Opportunity (Amendment) Act 1987	No. X of 1987	
Evidence (Neighbourhood Mediation Centres) Act 1987	No. X of 1987	
Extractive Industries (Amendment) Act 1987	No. X of 1987	
Fair Trading (Amendment) Act 1987	No. X of 1987	
Fire Authorities Act 1987	No. X of 1987	
Firearms (Amendment) Act 1987	No. X of 1987	
Fisheries (Abalone) Act 1987	No. X of 1987	
Forests (Dunstan Agreement) Act 1987	No. X of 1987	
Gas and Fuel Corporation (Amendment) Act 1987	No. X of 1987	
Geelong Market Site (Amendment) Act 1987	No. X of 1987	
Grocery Prices Act 1987	No. X of 1987	
Health (Amendment) Act 1987	No. X of 1987	
Health (Children's Services) Act 1987	No. X of 1987	
Housing (Amendment) Act 1987	No. X of 1987	
Human Tissue (Amendment) Act 1987	No. X of 1987	
Infertility (Medical Procedures) (Amendment) Act 1987	No. X of 1987	
Intellectually Disabled Persons' Services (Amendment) Act 1987	No. X of 1987	
Judicial Salaries Act 1987	No. X of 1987	
Jurisdiction of Courts (Cross-vesting) Act 1987	No. X of 1987	
La Trobe University (Amendment) Act 1987	No. X of 1987	
Land (Amendment and Miscellaneous Matters) Act 1987	No. X of 1987	
Land (Miscellaneous Matters) Act 1987	No. X of 1987	
Legal Profession Practice (Professional Indemnity) Act 1987	No. X of 1987	
Melbourne and Metropolitan Board of Works (Amendment) Act 1987	No. X of 1987	
Metropolitan Fire Brigades Superannuation (Amendment) Act 1987	No. X of 1987	
Mines (Miscellaneous Amendments) Act 1987	No. X of 1987	
National Mutual Royal Savings Bank Limited (Merger) Act 1987	No. X of 1987	
National Parks (Amendment) Act 1987	No. X of 1987	
National Parks (Dandenong Ranges) Act 1987	No. X of 1987	
Planning Appeals (Amendment) Act 1987	No. X of 1987	
Police Regulation (Protective Services) Act 1987	No. X of 1987	
Property Law (Amendment) Act 1987	No. X of 1987	
Psychologists Registration Act 1987	No. X of 1987	
Public Holidays (Bicentennial Celebrations) Act 1987	No. X of 1987	
Public Service (Amendment) Act 1987	No. X of 1987	
Racing (Amendment) Act 1987	No. X of 1987	
Racing (Further Amendment) Act 1987	No. X of 1987	
Racing (Miscellaneous Amendments) Act 1987	No. X of 1987	
Residential Tenancies (Amendment) Act 1987	No. X of 1987	
River Murray Waters (Amendment) Act 1987	No. X of 1987	
Road Safety (Amendment) Act 1987	No. X of 1987	
Sale of Goods (Vienna Convention) Act 1987	No. X of 1987	
Sisters of Mercy (Wodonga Land) Act 1987	No. X of 1987	
State Concessions (Amendment) Act 1987	No. X of 1987	
State Trust Corporation of Victoria Act 1987	No. X of 1987	
Superannuation Schemes (Accident Compensation) Act 1987	No. X of 1987	
Survey Co-ordination (Amendment) Act 1987	No. X of 1987	
Swan Hill Pioneer Settlement (Amendment) Act 1987	No. X of 1987	
Taxation (Reciprocal Powers) Act 1987	No. X of 1987	
Taxation Acts Amendment Act 1987	No. X of 1987	
Victoria Grants Commission (Amendment) Act 1987	No. X of 1987	
Victorian Arts Centre (Amendment) Act 1987	No. X of 1987	
Water Acts (Amendment) Act 1987	No. X of 1987	

== Sources ==
- "1987 Victorian Historical Acts". AustLII.
