= Sean Lynch (artist) =

Irish visual artist

- Born: Kerry, Ireland
- Occupation: Artist

Sean Lynch is a contemporary Irish visual artist. He lives and works in Askeaton, County Limerick, Ireland.

== Early life and education ==
Lynch was born in County Kerry, Ireland in and studied art at the Städelschule. He has a master's degree in History of Art from the University of Limerick.

== Work ==
Lynch works with forgotten histories especially those of public monuments. He describes his outlook in an interview: “We live in a time with so much information available to us—the least we can do is try to use it to recontextualize the vicious binary aggression that is linear history.”

== Career ==
Lynch has exhibited with EVA International (2006), and had solo exhibitions with the Crawford Gallery (2011), Hugh Lane Gallery (2012–15), Modern Art Oxford (2014), representing Ireland at the Venice Biennale in 2015, Royal Hibernian Academy (2016), the Charles H. Scott Gallery (2016), the Rose Art Museum (2016), and the Douglas Hyde Gallery (2017). In A Rocky Road at the Crawford Gallery, he investigated the legacy of Eilish O'Connell's Great Wall of Kinsale. In his Douglas Hyde Gallery exhibition, Lynch made work about the relocation and presentation of the Tau Cross of Kilnaboy in Rosc '67. In 2019 he created an exhibition about the Yorkshire forger Flint Jack for the Yorkshire Sculpture International 2019 art exhibition, displayed in the Henry Moore Institute.

In 2019 he was Visiting Professor of Sculpture at Carnegie Mellon School of Art, Pittsburgh.

Lynch was commissioned by the City of Melbourne to make Distant Things Appear Suddenly Near in 2021. The public artwork consists of a "scale replica of the Corkman Hotel", felled elm trees, and parts of Hossein Valamanesh’s artwork Faultline (1997).

== Museum projects ==
Sleepwalkers (2012–15) at the Hugh Lane Gallery, curated by Michael Dempsey and Logan Sisley, was a two-year project in which six artists were invited to use the museum's resources, reveal their artistic process, and to collaborate with each other in this "unusual experiment in exhibition production". This process culminated in each artist developing a solo exhibition at the Hugh Lane Gallery and a publication. Lynch's exhibition was titled A Blow-by-Blow Account of Stonecarving in Oxford and took place during July – September 2013.

== Bibliography ==
- Lynch, Sean (with Jorge Sattore). The Rise and Fall of Flint Jack. Leeds: Henry Moore Institute, 2019. ISBN 9781905462629
- Barry, Kevin, and Sean Lynch. Bardlore / This is Bardcore. Southampton: John Hansard Gallery, 2019. ISBN 9781912431106
- Lynch, Sean, and Michael Hill. What is an apparatus?; [and] A walk through time. Dublin, Ireland: The Douglas Hyde Gallery, 2017. ISBN 9781905397679
- Lynch, Sean. Sean Lynch : Vancouver Days. Vancouver BC: Charles H. Scott Gallery Publication Studio Vancouver, 2016. ISBN 9781927385449
- Lynch, Sean, and Woodrow Kernohan. Sean Lynch : Adventure: capital. Italy: Ireland at Venice, 2015. ISBN 9780957625822
- Edited by Michael Dempsey and Logan Sisley. Sleepwalkers. Dublin: Hugh Lane Gallery and Ridinghouse, 2015. ISBN 9781905464982
- Lynch, Sean. A Blow-by-blow Account of Stonecarving in Oxford. Oxford: Modern Art Oxford, 2014. ISBN 9781901352603
- Lynch, Sean. For the birds. Carlow: VISUAL, 2014. ISBN 9780955863080
- Lynch, Sean. The stuccowork of Pat McAuliffe of Listowel. Tralee: Siamsa Tíre, 2008. ISBN 9780955863028
- Lynch, Sean. Yesterday's papers : art and artists in Irish newspapers. Sean Lynch, 2007. ISBN 9780955863004
- Lynch, Sean, and Matt Packer. Preliminary sketches for the reappearance of HyBrazil. Galway: Galway Arts Centre, 2007. ISBN 9780955863035
