= The Alchemist, Battersea =

Former pub in Battersea, London

Coordinates: 51°27′34″N 0°10′46″W

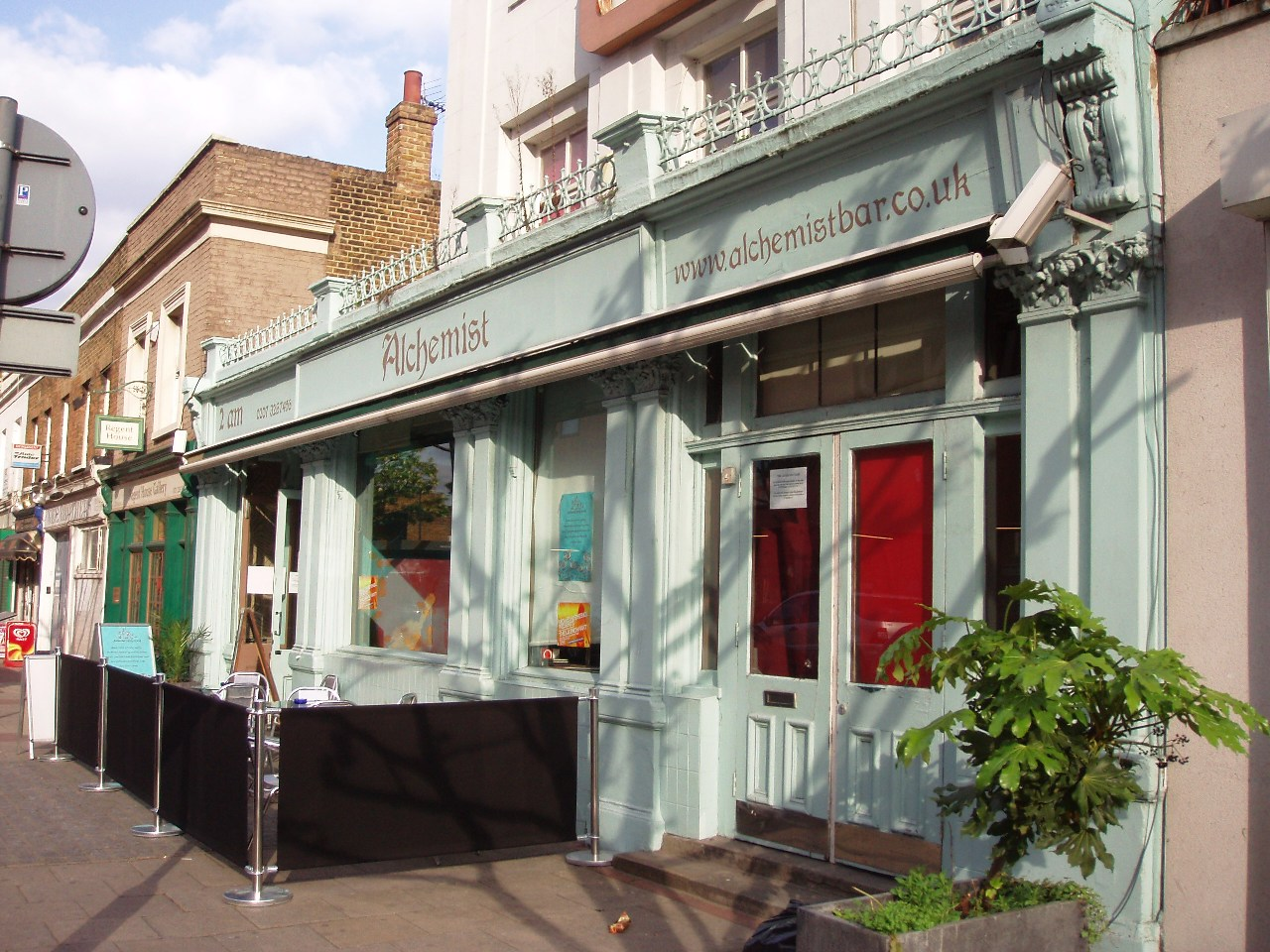
The pub in 2008

The Alchemist is a former pub at 225 St John's Hill, Battersea, London, that was demolished in May 2015 after over 100 years in business, and rebuilt in 2018.

The pub was originally called The Fishmongers' Arms, and was built in 1854. It closed in 2013, and was demolished in 2015 by a developer hoping to extend the building and build a block of flats. Wandsworth Council regarded the demolition having taken place without planning permission, and called it a "very serious breach" of council rules, and "unjustified". The council ordered developer Udhyam Amim to rebuild the pub and restore it to its appearance prior to demolition, but a year later this had not been carried out and the developer was seeking retrospective approval to demolish the building and replace it with six apartments, along with retail and commercial space.

The demolition was compared to that of the Carlton Tavern in Kilburn, north London, which was demolished in April the same year. The Carlton Tavern was subsequently rebuilt and re-opened following a community campaign and planning appeals.

In July 2018 the building was restored. In October that year its owners applied for planning permission to make the building into a shop, office or food establishment, but planners rejected the application, ruling that the change of use would "result in the loss of a public house of historic and community value". This rejection was later appealed and the building's classification was changed to D2, "assembly and leisure".

== See also ==
- Carlton Inn, Melbourne, Australia
- Carlton Tavern, Kilburn
- Ship of Theseus
- Battle of Britain, illegally demolished in Northfleet, Kent, England, council refused to list as community asset and never rebuilt; now a care home
