= Victorian Funds Management Corporation =

Agency of the Government of Victoria, Australia

Agency overview
- Jurisdiction: Government of Victoria
- Headquarters: Level 13, 101 Collins Street, Melbourne
- Minister responsible: Jaclyn Symes, Treasurer of Victoria
- Agency executives: Kate Galvin, CEO; Russell Clarke, CIO; Lucy Carr, COO
- Website: Official website

The Victorian Funds Management Corporation (VFMC) is an agency of the Government of Victoria in Melbourne.

The VFMC was established by the Victorian Funds Management Corporation Act 1994 (No. 61 of 1994). Its role is to provide investment and funds management services to Victorian public authorities. The corporation controls a total of about $70 billion in assets that are used mainly to pay superannuation entitlements to serving and former state public servants.

The fund suffered from poor investment decisions during the 2008 financial crisis when money was invested in the Queensland-based company, Life Settlements Wholesale Fund. Funds suffered, like many, during the Covid pandemic of 2020-2023, when funds under management dropped by AU$2.4 billion to $72.1 billion in 2022.

In compliance with climate-friendly investment, VFMC reported its aspiration to meet 'net zero' criteria for the majority of its portfolio in 2023.

== See also ==
- Australian Government Future Fund
- Queensland Investment Corporation
- New South Wales Treasury Corporation
