= Carlton Inn =

Destroyed pub in the Melbourne suburb of Carlton

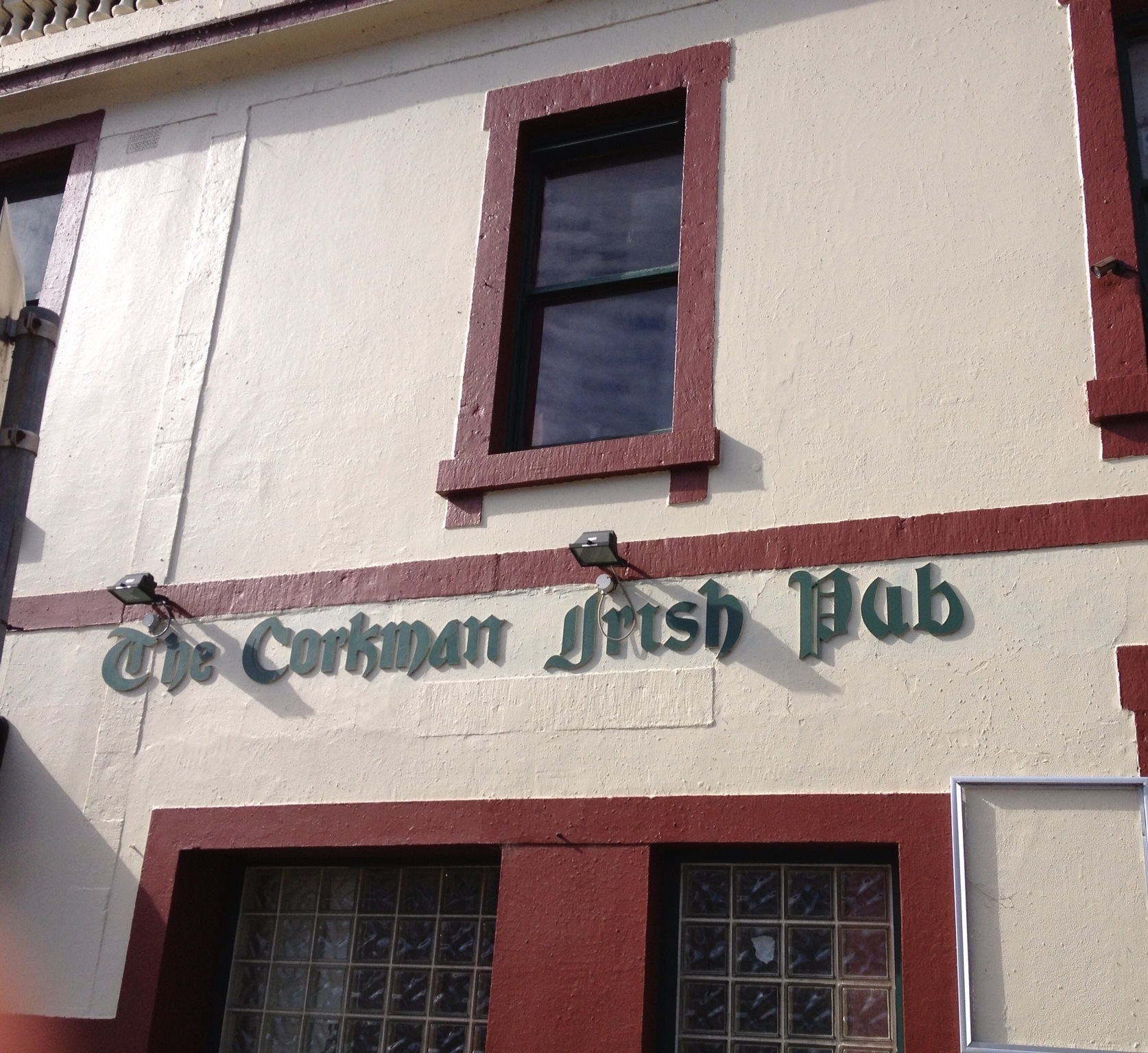
- A section of the pub's exterior in 2013
- Alternative names: Corkman Irish Pub; Corkman Hotel

General information
- Location: Corner of Leicester and Pelham Streets, Carlton, Victoria, Australia
- Coordinates: 37°48′08″S 144°57′39″E
- Groundbreaking: February 1856
- Demolished: 16 October 2016

The Carlton Inn was a pub in Carlton, Melbourne, in the Australian state of Victoria. Built c. 1856, it was illegally demolished without planning or heritage approval on the weekend of 15–16 October 2016. Before demolition, it was one of the oldest buildings in the Carlton area. In its last years, it was known as the Corkman Irish Pub.

== History ==
The Carlton Inn's history began when a 0.25-acre (0.10 ha) crown allotment at the corner of Leicester and Pelham Streets was sold to R. Hepburn in 1853, who subsequently subdivided the land into numerous small allotments with the corner lot measuring 70 by 70 feet (21 m × 21 m). Construction of the hotel was underway by early February 1856, as evidenced by an advertisement for bricks. The completed Carlton Inn was licensed in 1856 to George Edmonds. Soon after it was transferred to John Cozens. The Noble family were proprietors for about a century from 1863, when a Mrs Noble was listed as owner in the rate books, through to William K. Noble of Mirboo who was owner in 1923 to 1936, and then the estate of W. K. Noble in 1954.

A robbery occurred at the pub on the 27 August 1887 in the late evening, in which the burglar gained access to the bedroom of the licensee, Duncan McMillan, and stole £100 worth of items, including a watch, a gold pin with diamonds and bluestone, other jewellery and a Webley Revolver, before escaping through a window. On 4 October, John Charles Vernon was arrested in connection with the robbery, and it was found that in his possession was a pawn ticket for a pin matching the description of that stolen from the hotel and which was later identified as belonging to McMillan. Before his arrest in connection with the Carlton Inn robbery, Vernon had been acquitted of a charge of stealing a cash box from the Niagara Hotel in Lonsdale Street.

In 1933, architects Thomas Watts & Sons designed a new rear addition valued at £500 including new kitchen, and alterations to the front bar. The works were carried out by builder G. G. Edwards of North Brighton. In 1936, a new two-storey section was built on the eastern boundary costing £700. Additional bedrooms and relocation of the kitchen (which had previously been a billiard room), were undertaken by Harry J. Johnston with designs by architect J. A. Trencher of Caulfield. In 1954, architect Harry J. Little designed further alterations, including single-storey sections for laundry, toilets, garage and fuel store, replacing former outbuildings. Building was undertaken by R. J. Johnstone of Mitcham.

In its last years, the hotel was known as the Corkman Irish Pub, with a large student clientele, and traditional Irish music sessions.

A nearby building proposal was objected in 2016 by the Carlton Residents Association due to the impact it would have had to the adjacent heritage places, including the Carlton Inn.

== Built form ==
The Carlton Inn was a two-storey brick-and-bluestone hotel with rendered façades in a simple Georgian style. It had a brown tiled dado on the Pelham and Leicester Street façades, and a balustered parapet with urns.

The site is included in the City of Melbourne Heritage Overlay (HO85), where it is described as:

historically significant as one of the earliest extant buildings in this part of Carlton, which has undergone substantial change since the time of its initial phase of construction in 1857. The Carlton Inn is of aesthetic significance as a good example of the Victorian period. The façade is relatively plain and generally indicative of the early to mid-Victorian period, though the parapet may date to the later Victorian period. The façade has a stucco finish but the original corner section may be partly stone.

== Demolition ==
In August 2016, the hotel was purchased for $4.76 million ($1.76 million above reserve) by a company known as '160 Leicester Pty Ltd', owned by Stefce Kutlesovski and Raman Shaqiri. A fire was deliberately lit inside the hotel on 8 October, and on Saturday morning 15 October, demolition was commenced by Shaq Demolitions and Excavations. A Melbourne City Council official attended the site and spoke to Kutlesovski, who was on site overseeing the demolition, and told him to cease the demolition. Kutlesovski refused, responding "It's my site, I can do whatever I want." A stop order was then issued by the City of Melbourne officer on Saturday, but the demolition contractors returned on Sunday, ignored it and completed the demolition.

== Reaction and approval of tower ==
The demolition of the Carlton Inn received extensive media coverage in state and national media, with both the Victorian Planning Minister Richard Wynne and Lord Mayor of Melbourne Robert Doyle conducting media interviews on the site. Councillor Doyle referred to the illegal demolition as "the most brazen and wanton act of vandalism" he had seen in his political career.

In response to the incident, several calls were made for increasing penalties for illegal demolition. An investigation by the Victorian Environment Protection Authority confirmed the presence of asbestos on the site.

Victorian Planning Minister Richard Wynne initially sought to have the pair rebuild the building through court action in the Victorian Civil and Administrative Tribunal. Wynne eventually scrapped initial plans to try and compel Shaqiri and Kutlesovsky to have the pub rebuilt, instead allowing them to build a 12-storey tower on the site, for which he received harsh criticism in the media. It was estimated that the developers would receive huge financial benefits. The deal allowed the pair to not have to rebuild the pub at all on the condition that the new tower development is completed before 2022. A further condition was that the site must be landscaped as a temporary public park by November 2019.

Critics of the developers, including parties to the case, were disappointed with the deal, saying that the deal Wynne reached with them was no disincentive for rogue developers. Crikey's Guy Rundle lamented that the pair were likely to make "millions" from the deal they had struck to build a 12-story tower on the site.

Following Wynne and the council's decision to allow the developers to develop the site and build a 12-story tower, the state opposition and planning groups demanded that the Government compulsorily acquire the site, which was within their legal power to do so under section 172 of the Planning and Environment Act 1987. It was argued this was the main method of setting a precedent and sending a message to further rogue developers.

A wooden scale replica of the Carlton Inn's facade was included as part of a public artwork by Sean Lynch. It is located in University Square across from the hotel site since 2021.

== Court action ==
Following the demolition, Kutlesovski and Shaqiri removed asbestos from the site and dumped it on another location, near a school and residential buildings, endangering the people in the vicinity. The pair were fined over $600,000 for breaches of the Environment Protection Act for illegal dumping of asbestos contaminated material following a successful prosecution by the Environment Protection Authority. The magistrate said in court he would have jailed them, but the law only allowed for fines. Raman Shaqiri was admonished in the court for smirking and trying to out-stare the magistrate.

The pair appeared again in court in 2019, and this time were fined a further $1.32 million for the demolition following a successful prosecution by the Victoria Building Authority. The fine was large so as to dissuade other developers from similar practices. The barrister representing the Government noted a lack of contrition by the pair, who had initially agreed to rebuild the pub, but then not only refused to, but made a legal challenge to the rebuild order, indicating they had no interest in doing it.

In September 2019, the pair appealed the fines in Sunshine Magistrates court, which saw the presiding magistrate, Judge Wraight, reduce their fines from just under $2 million to $1.1 million. The defendants allegedly showed no remorse, and one of the defendants chose not to not show up at court.

The developers did not build the temporary public park and as a result contempt of court proceedings were instigated in July 2020. Shaqiri and Kutlesovski were convicted in November 2020, and were sentenced on 15 December 2020 to jail and fined $150,000 with $250,000 legal costs awarded against them. The pair then completed the park, only after being sentenced to jail, as a last attempt to evade a jail sentence. The judge in the case remarked that they had to be "dragged every step of the way to compliance". Kutlesovski and Shaqiri failed in appealing their sentence and each spent 28 days in jail.

== Rebuild ==
A planning application for a modern three-storey pub, designed by Six Degrees, with two basement levels was lodged for the site in late 2022. After the development failed to get approval from the minister for planning, Shaqiri and Kutlesovski took the minister and Melbourne City Council to the planning tribunal.

After negotiations with the minister and council failed, Shaqiri and Kutlesovski agreed to rebuild a replica of the demolished pub. A spokesman for the pair said the new building will not be used as a pub and the owners have had discussions with The Salvation Army about using it for a food bank or community centre.

Construction of the new building began in June 2024, and the exterior of the replica pub was completed in 2026, over a year past the competition date specified by VCAT. The interior of the building is a hollow shell, as there was no compulsion to restore the interior. The rebuild was controversial: with one of the original complainants, Tim Staindl, calling the project a "Temu Corkman". The pub was not built with the same original bluestone, and instead is constructed from precast concrete. The Age reported that some planning insiders still believe the rebuild to be a "pragmatic victory", as it blocked the original goal of a lucrative apartment tower.
