= Planning and Environment Act 1987 =

Law in Australia

Parliament of Victoria
- Long title: An [Act] to establish a framework for planning the use and development of land in Victoria and for other purposes.
- Citation: 1987 No. 45
- Enacted by: Victorian Legislative Assembly
- Enacted by: Victorian Legislative Council
- Assented to: 27 May 1987
- Commenced: 27 May 1987 (Part 1, section 204); 16 February 1988 (s. 2(1); rest of Act (except Schedule items 118, 119)
- Administered by: Minister for Planning; Department of Environment, Land, Water and Planning

Legislative history

Initiating chamber: Victorian Legislative Assembly
- Bill title: Planning and Environment Bill
- Introduced by: Frank Wilkes OAM MLA, Minister for Local Government and Ian Trezise MLA
- First reading: 25 February 1987
- Second reading: 24 March 1987

Revising chamber: Victorian Legislative Council
- Bill title: Planning and Environment Bill
- Member(s) in charge: Jim Kennan MLC, Minister for Planning and Environment
- Second reading: 24 March 1987

Amended by
- Planning and Environment (Amendment) Acts: 1988, 1989, 1993, 1995, 1997, 2000, 2004, 2007, 2012, 2013 and 2021

Related legislation
- Environment Effects Act 1978; Conservation, Forests and Lands Act 1987; Subdivision Act 1988; Administrative Appeals Tribunal (Planning) Act 1991; Building Act 1993; Catchment and Land Protection Act 1994; Liquour Control Reform Act 1998; Road Management Act 2004; Transport Integration Act 2010; Environment Protection Act 2017; Heritage Act 2017; Victorian Planning Authority Act 2017; Marine and Coastal Act 2018; Local Government Act 2020; COVID-19 Omnibus (Emergency Measures) Act 2020

Keywords
- Planning
- Status: Current legislation

The Planning and Environment Act 1987 (No. 45 of 1987) is an act passed by the Parliament of Victoria in 1987 to provide a framework for urban planning and the use and development of land in the State of Victoria.

== Purpose ==
The act's stated purpose is "to establish a framework for planning the use, development and protection of land in Victoria in the present and long-term interests of all Victorians."

== Background ==
Suggestions for legislation surrounding urban planning in Victoria materialised in the 1920s. However, it was not until years later that the initial Town and Country Planning Act 1944 was enacted that provided a regulatory framework for land use and development in the state. Later, in 1961, the act was amended by the Bolte Government to broaden the scope of planning controls and workability of its systems. The Town and Country Planning Act 1944 was then amended for a final time in 1984 on similar administrative principles.

When the act went through the second reading in the Legislative Council, then Minister for Planning and Environment Jim Kennan addressed the rationale behind the introduction of new legislation regarding planning and replacing the considered obsolete Town and Country Planning Act 1944.

"Contemporary planning almost invariably involves restrictions on whether land or buildings may be used or developed. For this aspect of planning, where property rights are affected, that legislation is needed".

— Minister for Planning and Environment Jim Kennan reading the Planning and Environment Bill for the second time in 1987.

Concerns raised from the opposition during debates of the bill's merits regarding the jurisdiction of the act and the abilities for relevant decision-making bodies on the usage of land in their respective areas. Kennen responded by saying the act would have a broad scope to consolidate practices.

"It was never intended to introduce a planning act to precisely define the scope of planning, or tell planners, councils or anybody else how to plan. The Bill enables planning proposals to be implemented. Most planning, as such, does not need specific legislation".

— Minister for Planning and Environment Jim Kennan.

The bill would subsequently pass both houses of the Parliament of Victoria with amendments and assented on 27 May 1987 by the Governor of Victoria The Reverend Davis McCaughey AC.

== Scope of the act ==
The act sets out the legal framework for planning instruments and regulating land use and development in Victoria. The main instruments that allow for urban planning to be enabled in Victoria are:

- The act itself and relevant statutes
- Ministerial directions
- Planning provisions and planning schemes
- Authorities and enforcement
- Appeals and dispute resolution

The instruments of the act allow tangible planning policies, such as the Planning Provisions and Planning Schemes to be created, amended and ultimately administered. Under Section S8, the act also outlines the jurisdiction of the Minister for Planning and their ability to direct these provisions and schemes and the role of relevant authorities such as local government area councils (LGAs) or municipalities. These positions are respectively known as "Planning Authorities" and "Responsible Authorities" with each role varying between setting out relevant policies and directions as well as enforcing the legislation through processes such as to permit applications and panels.

In 1996, the act saw the addition of the Planning and Environment (Planning Schemes) Act 1996, which set out a standardised and universal template for Planning Schemes called the Victorian Planning Provisions. The Provisions stipulates required documentation and inclusions regarding planning controls from LGAs. Generally, they must include the purpose and vision of the scheme, planning policy frameworks, zone and overlay controls, and other relevant provisions.

Planning Schemes are a legally binding document that sets out planning controls for the use and development of land in the respective jurisdictions of LGAs. However, in some cases, the Minister is also responsible for certain applications and responsible for the application process and decision. For example, the City of Melbourne has its own planning schemes relevant to its own geographical area.

Both the Planning Provisions and Planning Schemes can be amended by both LGAs and the Minister for Planning. However, such desire to amend these documents have differing processes; The LGA must go through a formal process that the Minister must approve while the Minister can bypass these steps at their discretion under their responsibilities within S8.

The nesting of a planning process between two levels of governments within the state creates a framework similar to a judicial system such as the Supreme Court of Victoria. By way of the act, enforcement is generally administered through planning permits and relevant processes for grounds of approval or refusal. Under Sections 47 to 71, this process is to ensure that the intended land use and development are aligned with the act and both the Planning Provisions and Planning Scheme. Furthermore, responsible authorities can also direct applications with a 'Section 173 Agreement' that negotiates a consideration with an owner or developer of land to stipulate conditions or restrictions for land use and development or other objectives concerning it.

Indeed, there are mechanisms in place for enforcement, non-compliance and dispute resolution. Sections 114 allows a responsible authority or any person to apply to the Victorian Civil and Administrative Tribunal hand an enforcement order that can stop, not start, maintain or restore relevant actions to use and development. Additionally, Section 125 allows an escalation of disputes to the court system through requests for injunctions for perceived non-compliance or enforcement orders. Finally, Section 130 allows responsible authorities to serve infringement notices to any perceived non-compliance or contraventions in areas in which the authority is responsible. The enforcement of the act is also complemented by protections set out within its body but also complemented by other legislation such as the Heritage Act 2017 and Environmental Protection Act 2017 which can be administered through referrals in application or planning scheme overlays on a site. Yet, there have been criticisms of this enforcement mechanism, as seen with the non-compliance case of the demolition of the Carlton Inn by developers in 2016 and the protracted legal proceedings between the developers, the State Government and the public community.

== Changes to the act ==
The Planning and Environment Act 1987 has undergone various changes and other legislation to the initial act. Some examples include the establishment of the Victorian Planning Authority (VPA), a statutory body that focuses on long-term strategic planning and the COVID-19 Omnibus (Emergency Measures) Act 2020 that allowed digital inspections and hearings of planning related matters.
