= Church of Christ in Poland =

Christian free Protestant denomination in Poland

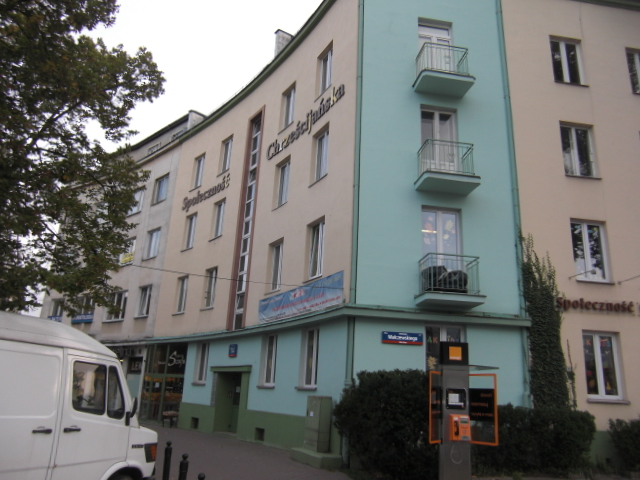
- Headquarters of the Church of Christ in Poland
- Classification: Christianity
- Orientation: Protestantism
- Theology: Evangelicalism
- Polity: Presbyterian-Congregational
- Governance: National Conference
- Leader: Andrzej W. Bajeński
- Associations: Evangelical Alliance in the Republic of Poland
- Region: Poland
- Headquarters: Warsaw
- Origin: 1921; Warsaw
- Separated from: United Evangelical Church in Poland
- Congregations: 48 (2023)
- Members: 6,650 (2023)
- Ministers: 490 (2023)
- Official website: chrystusowi.pl
- Slogan: Faithful to God, Friendly to People, Devoted to the Gospel

The Church of Christ in the Republic of Poland (previously known as the Community of Churches of Christ in Poland and Church of Christ Congregations) is a Christian free Protestant denomination of the evangelical tradition, rooted in the Churches of Christ movement (often called Campbellites after Thomas Campbell). It advocates a return to Biblical teachings, guided by the maxim: "Where the Bible speaks, we speak; where the Bible is silent, we are silent", and the Reformation principle of sola scriptura. As of 2022, the church had 6,650 members, including 490 clergy, across 48 congregations. It is organized on a Presbyterian model. Its press organ is the quarterly Słowo i Życie.

The church is a founding member of the Evangelical Alliance in Poland. On 1 February 1990, it was entered into the register of churches and religious associations by the Ministry of Administration and Digitization under Section A, number 24. Its headquarters are in Warsaw. The Presiding Elder is Pastor Andrzej W. Bajeński.

== History ==
=== Second Polish Republic ===
The Church of Christ's ideas emerged in Poland in late 1921, when pastor Konstanty Jaroszewicz, the movement's pioneer, returned from the United States to his native Starowieś. He soon gathered a small group of followers comprising several families. The first baptisms occurred in May and September 1923, establishing the first congregation in Starowieś. Activities centred on Kresy, primarily among Orthodox populations. In autumn 1924, Jaroszewicz and his wife moved to Kobryn, which became a missionary hub.

In 1923, Jaroszewicz sought legal recognition for the community, but the request was denied. In 1926, despite resistance from Ludwik Szenderowski, local legalization was granted for congregations in the Wołyń and Polesie voivodeships. By the 1930s, congregations were legalized in other eastern voivodeships as well. Until 1925, the group was called the "International Christian Mission", renamed at a 1926 Kobryn conference to "Mission of Evangelical Christians in Poland". In 1928, the Union of Churches of Christ was formed.

By 1928, 30 congregations existed. In 1929, the First National Union of Churches of Christ Assembly in Kobryn established an Executive Committee: Konstanty Jaroszewicz (president), Jan Bukowicz (vice-president and treasurer), Jerzy Sacewicz (secretary), Bolesław Winnik (deputy secretary), and members Grzegorz Bajko, Teodor Pawluk, Nikon Jakoniuk, Jan Moskaluk, and Jan Władysiuk. Annual assemblies occurred in various locations (except 1933) until 1939. Until 1939, the Union of Churches of Christ was headquartered in Kobryn, then moved to Brest. All interwar congregations were Russian-speaking, with the largest concentration near Kobryn, where around 1,500 members lived in the Kobryn County by 1937, mostly farmers, urban poor, and domestic workers.

=== World War II ===
The outbreak of World War II split congregations across the General Government, East Prussia, Belarus, Ukraine, and the Reich, with most on Ukrainian territory. Occupation borders hindered operations, with the harshest conditions in the General Government, where religious gatherings were banned in May 1941. Some congregations joined the Union of German Evangelical Free Church Congregations (Baptists). Many leaders were deported to the Reich, concentration camps, or Soviet gulags. Post-war border changes left 72 congregations beyond Poland's eastern border, incorporated into the Soviet All-Union Council of Evangelical Christians-Baptists.

=== Polish People's Republic ===
In 1945, Union of Churches of Christ congregations joined the Baptist Christian Church of Poland. The Baptist Christian Church of Poland leadership opposed Jerzy Sacewicz's methods of acquiring sacral buildings in Pomerania and Masuria and demanded the dissolution of the Union of Churches of Christ Executive Committee, which persisted despite integration. Consequently, in November 1946, Union of Churches of Christ leaders withdrew from the Baptist Christian Church of Poland.

In November 1946, the Union of Churches of Christ of the Evangelical Faith in Poland resumed operations, with four congregations in Białystok Voivodeship (Siemiatycze, Boćki, Milejczyce, Grodzisk), eight in Masuria (Olsztyn, Lidzbark Warmiński, Kętrzyn, Mrągowo, Rumy, Świętajno, Ruskowo, Pasłęk), and others in Gdańsk, Sosnowiec, and Muratyna (Lublin Voivodeship).

In 1948, the first issue of the monthly Jedność was published (2,000 copies), alongside a 10,000-copy Śpiewnik Kościoła Chrystusowego and several pamphlets.

The Polish People's Republic era was challenging. On 15 September 1950, State Security arrested clergy and lay workers after fabricating evidence, targeting the entire Church Council: Jerzy Sacewicz (president), Mikołaj Korniluk (secretary), Bolesław Winnik (treasurer), Paweł Bajeński, and Nikon Jakoniuk. Bajeński and Jakoniuk were released after months, but others faced espionage charges, with charitable work and Western contacts deemed subversive. Jerzy Sacewicz faced accusations:

Sacewicz remained in areas liberated by the Red Army, concealing his past and religious activities, and worked at the Brest Communal Bank. After the German-Soviet war began and eastern territories were occupied, he immediately shifted allegiance, contacting local SD authorities and the German Eastern Front staff. Secret talks earned him their trust, documents, and access to military transport, including aviation… He frequently traveled to Ukrainian cities, especially Kyiv, posing as a fervent Hitler supporter, urging locals to submit to Nazi rule, work in Germany, and abandon resistance, while encouraging collaboration… He continued this pro-Hitler activity until liberation.

Sacewicz was imprisoned and tortured until 1952.

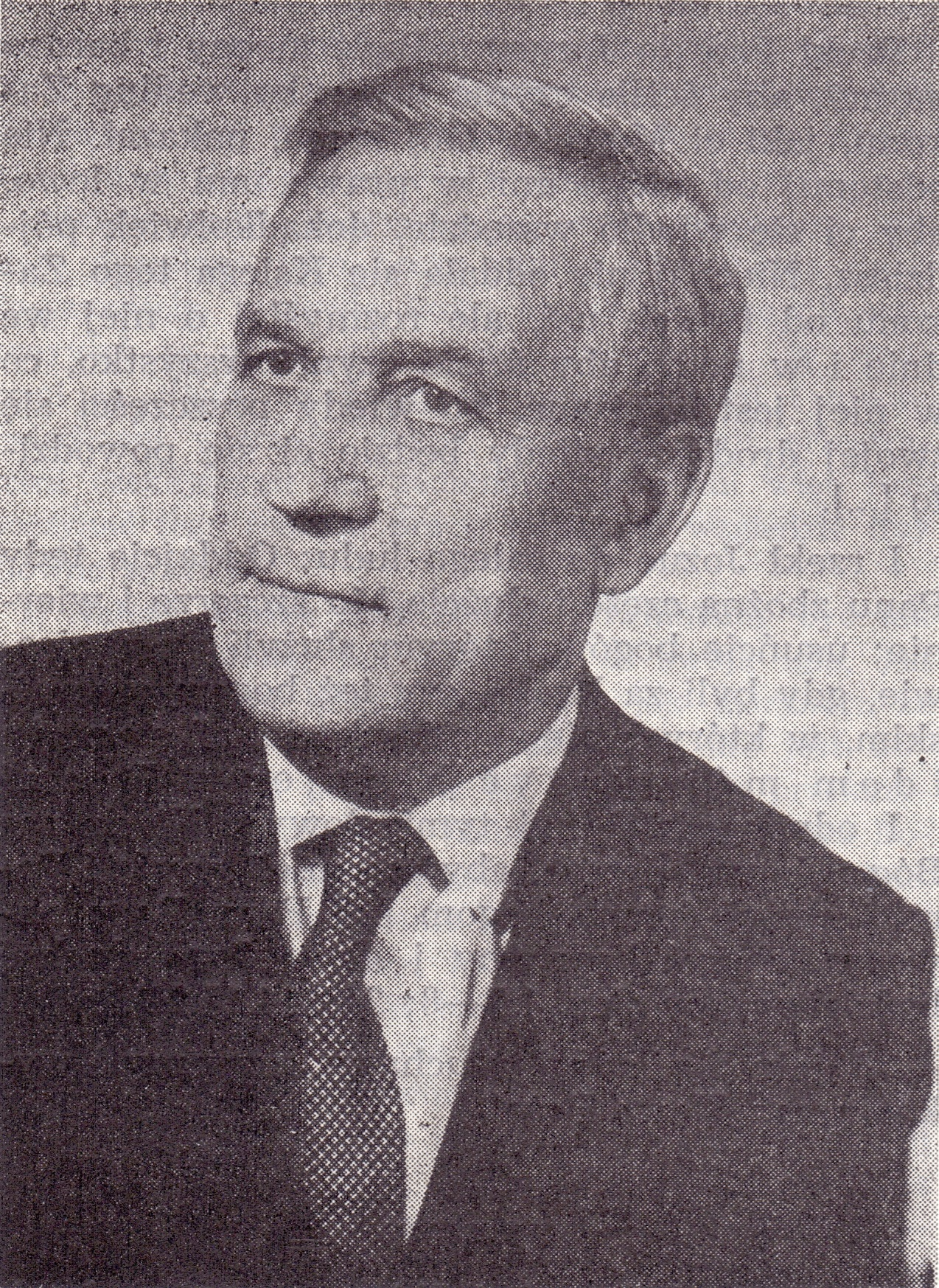
Konstanty Sacewicz, United Evangelical Church president between 1975 and 1981

In 1951, Paweł Bajeński, released and hospitalized, worked to reclaim sealed chapels and convened a conference in Inowrocław, electing a new board: Paweł Bajeński (president), Konstanty Sacewicz (secretary), Nikon Jakoniuk (treasurer), while Jerzy Sacewicz and Mikołaj Korniluk remained imprisoned. Church activities were limited to services, with authorities enforcing shared chapel use among denominations. The Union of Churches of Christ had 24 congregations, 53 stations, 12 chapels, 6 prayer halls, and about 3,000 members. Ryszard Michalak alleged Bajeński followed state directives to merge with the United Evangelical Church, facilitating Union of Churches of Christ's entry into the United Evangelical Church. Jerzy Sacewicz, imprisoned, later criticized Bajeński for "leading the Church into Babylon". Separatist tendencies emerged in 1956, backed by Americans, but Bajeński prevented a Union of Churches of Christ exit from the United Evangelical Church. In 1958, J. Naumiuk and Walenty Dawidow founded the independent Church of Christ in Poland, registered in 1982.

From 1953 to 1988, Polish Churches of Christ were part of the federated United Evangelical Church in the Polish People's Republic. Konstanty Sacewicz served as United Evangelical Church president from 1975 to 1981, and Henryk Rother-Sacewicz led the Churches of Christ faction in its final years.

After the United Evangelical Church's dissolution, the group became the independent "Church of Christ Congregations" in 1988, led by Pastor Henryk Rother-Sacewicz.

=== Third Polish Republic ===
After over a decade under Henryk Rother-Sacewicz, Andrzej W. Bajeński became leader in 2011. Post-1989, the church renamed itself twice: on 30 November 2004, to "Community of Churches of Christ in Poland", and since 31 August 2011, as "Church of Christ in the Republic of Poland".

== Agencies ==
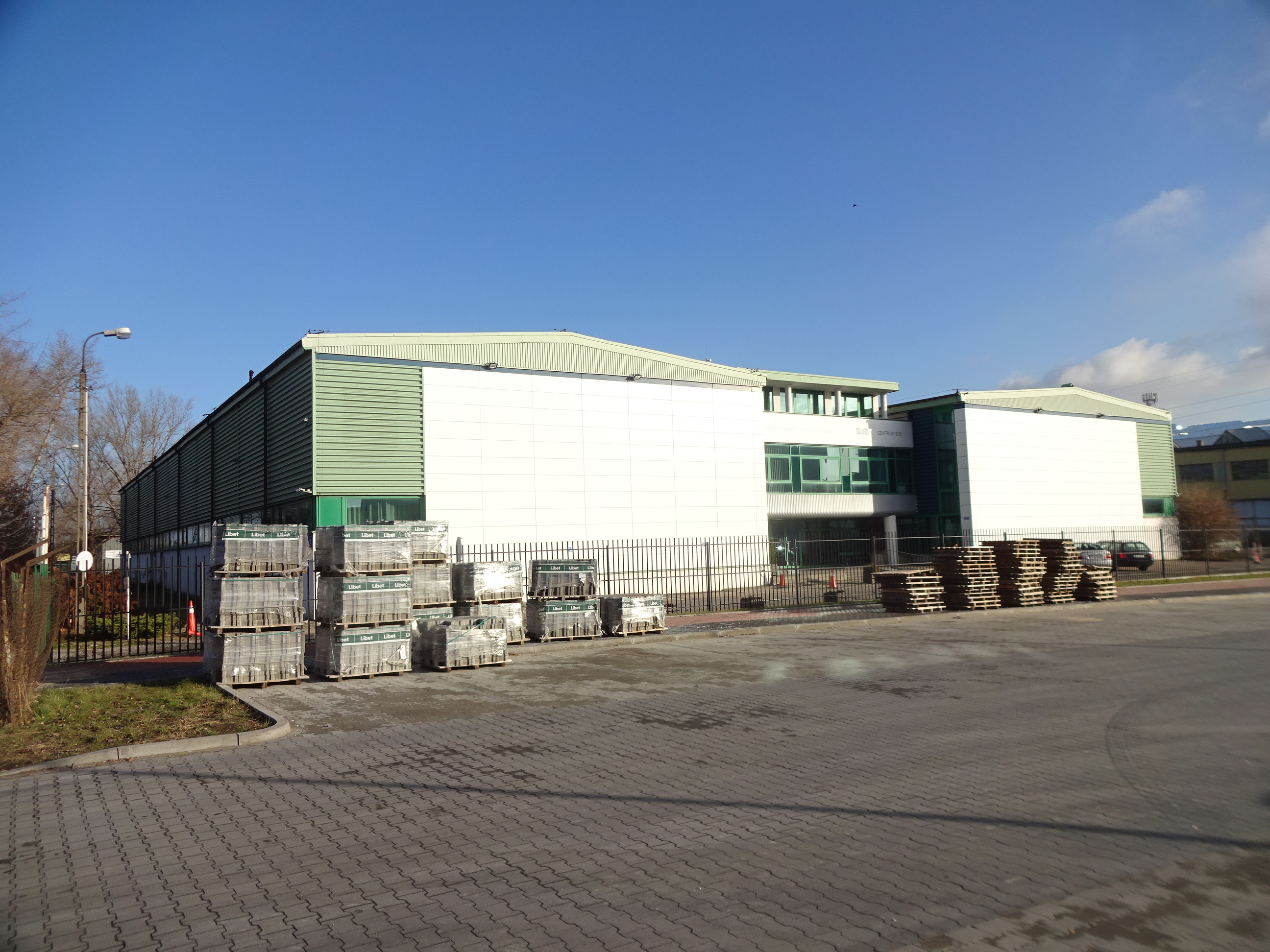
Centre E10 in Warsaw

The oldest agency is the Betania Retirement Home in Ostróda, established in 1958 within the United Evangelical Church (then called the Old People's Home). The Ostróda Camp Catechetical-Missionary Centre began in May 1971 in Ostrów near Ostróda.

The Christian Biblical Institute, founded in 1984 in Warsaw, conducts educational and publishing activities, releasing 83 titles with over 250,000 copies.

In 1988, the Słowo i Życie Publishing House was established through Henryk Ryszard Tomaszewski's efforts, then secretary of the Church's National Council. It launched the monthly Słowo i Życie in 1989, becoming a bimonthly in 1990 and a quarterly in 1995, alongside several books. Bronisław Hury has been director since 2001, with a circulation of about 800 copies.

Other agencies include:

- Centre E10
- Graceland Education Centre
- Hope4You Education Centre
- CRK ProEcclesia
- International Church Association
- International Culture Exchange ICX
- Dobro Czynić Charitable Mission
- Dom Łaski Evangelical Mission in Poland
- Poślij Mnie Mission
- Nadzieja Social Mission
- Pioneer Bible Translators Poland

== Congregations and mission stations ==
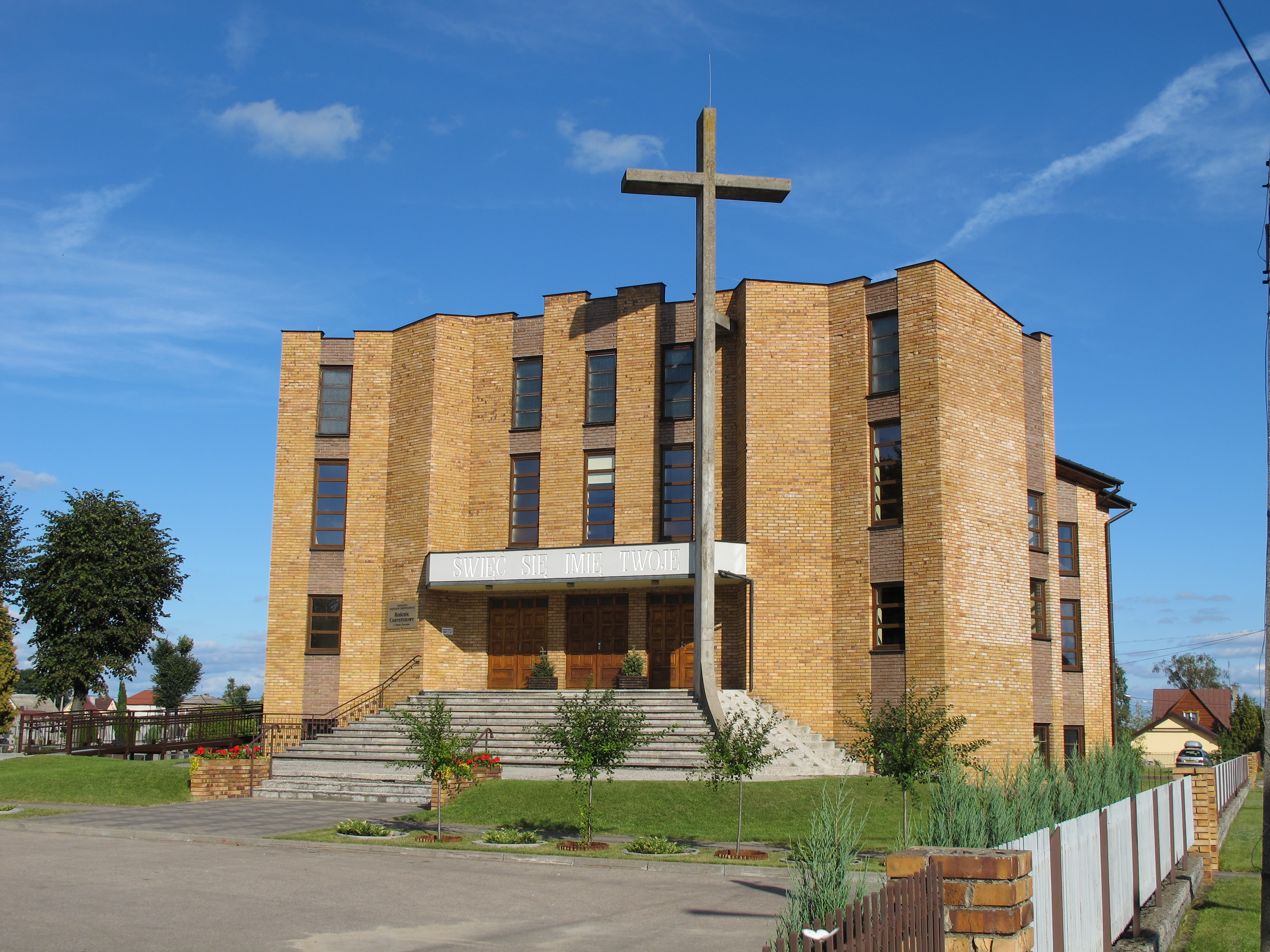
Church of Christ in Bielsk Podlaski

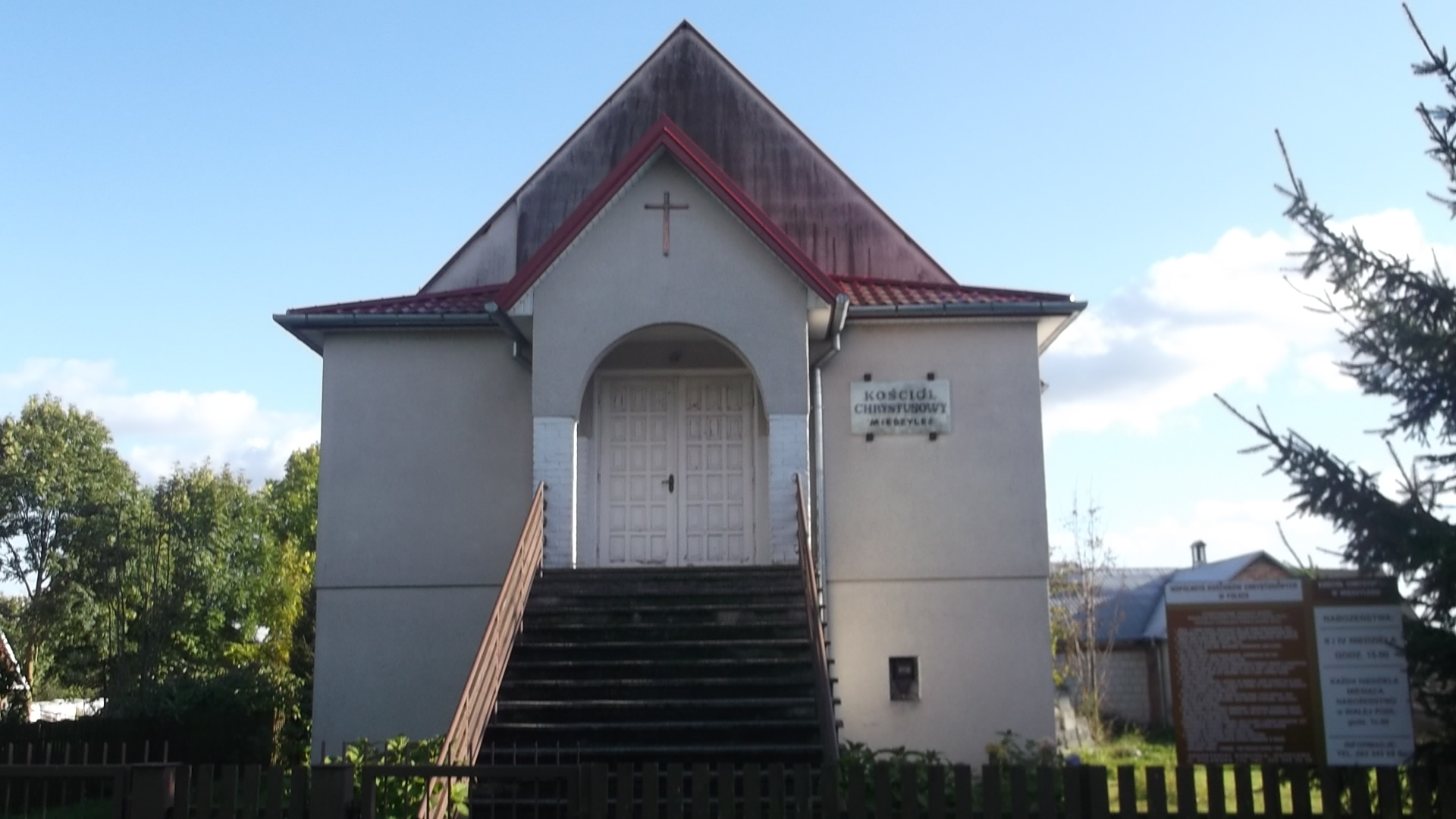
Church of Christ in Międzyleś

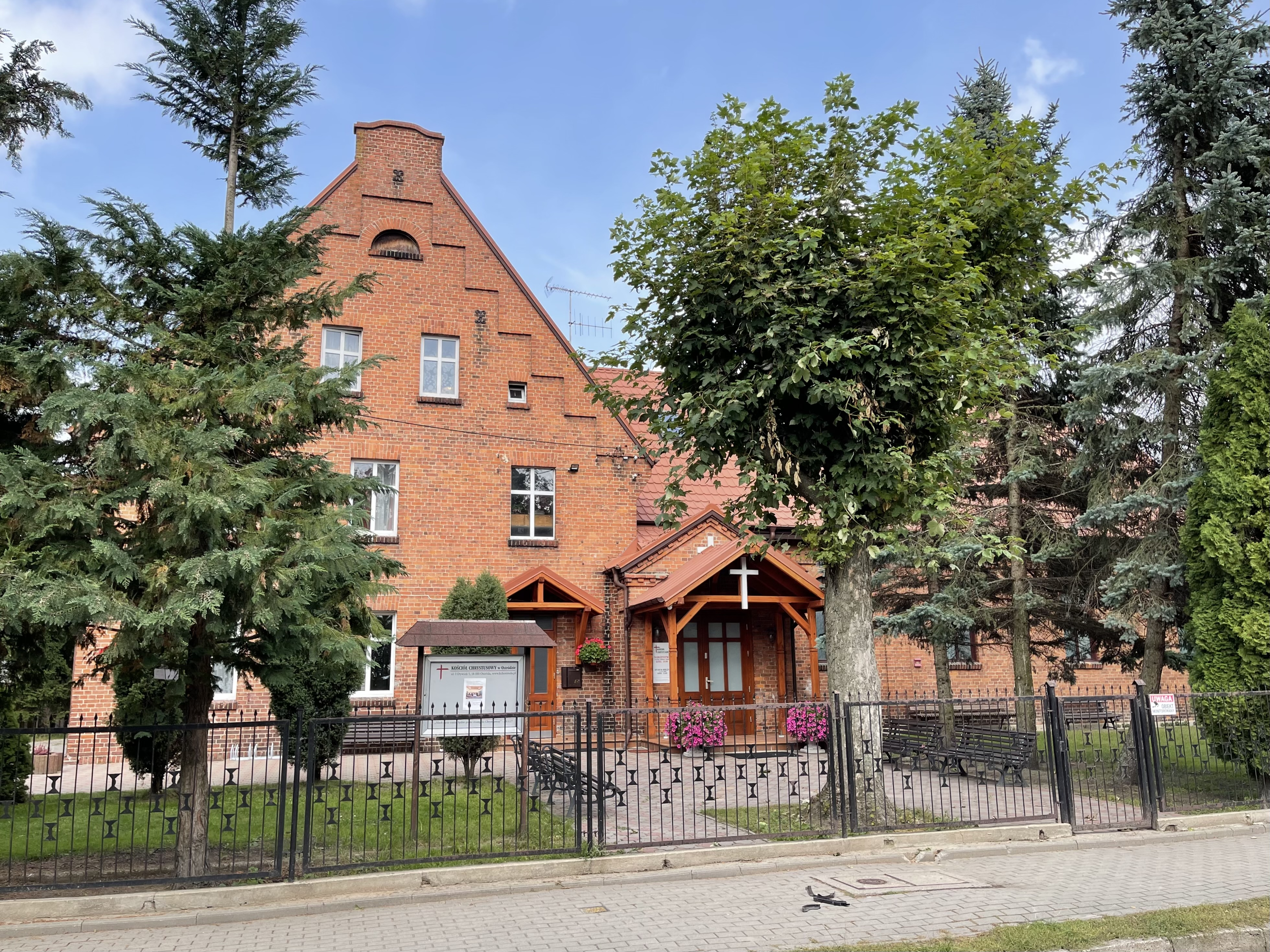
Church of Christ in Ostróda

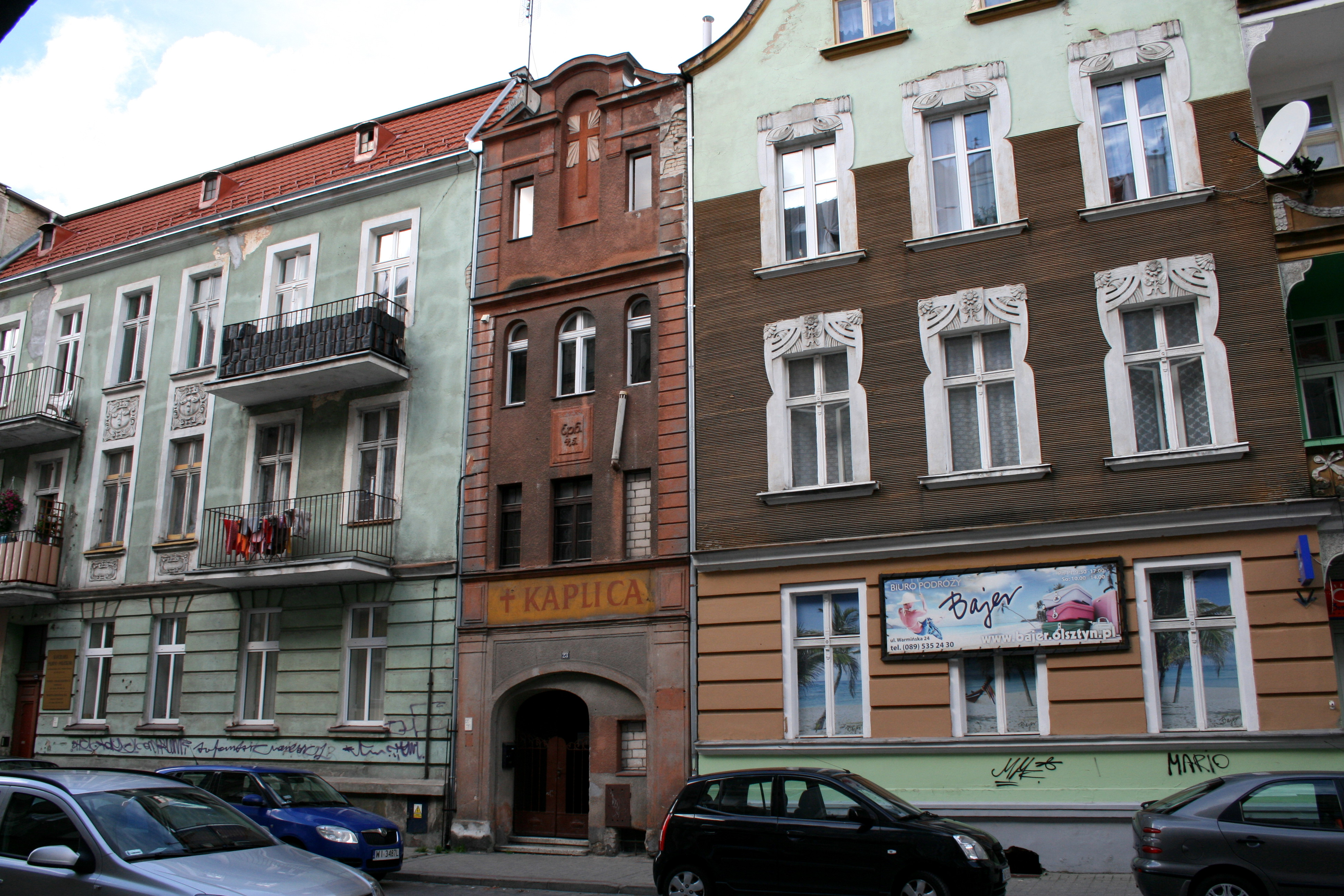
Chapel in Olsztyn

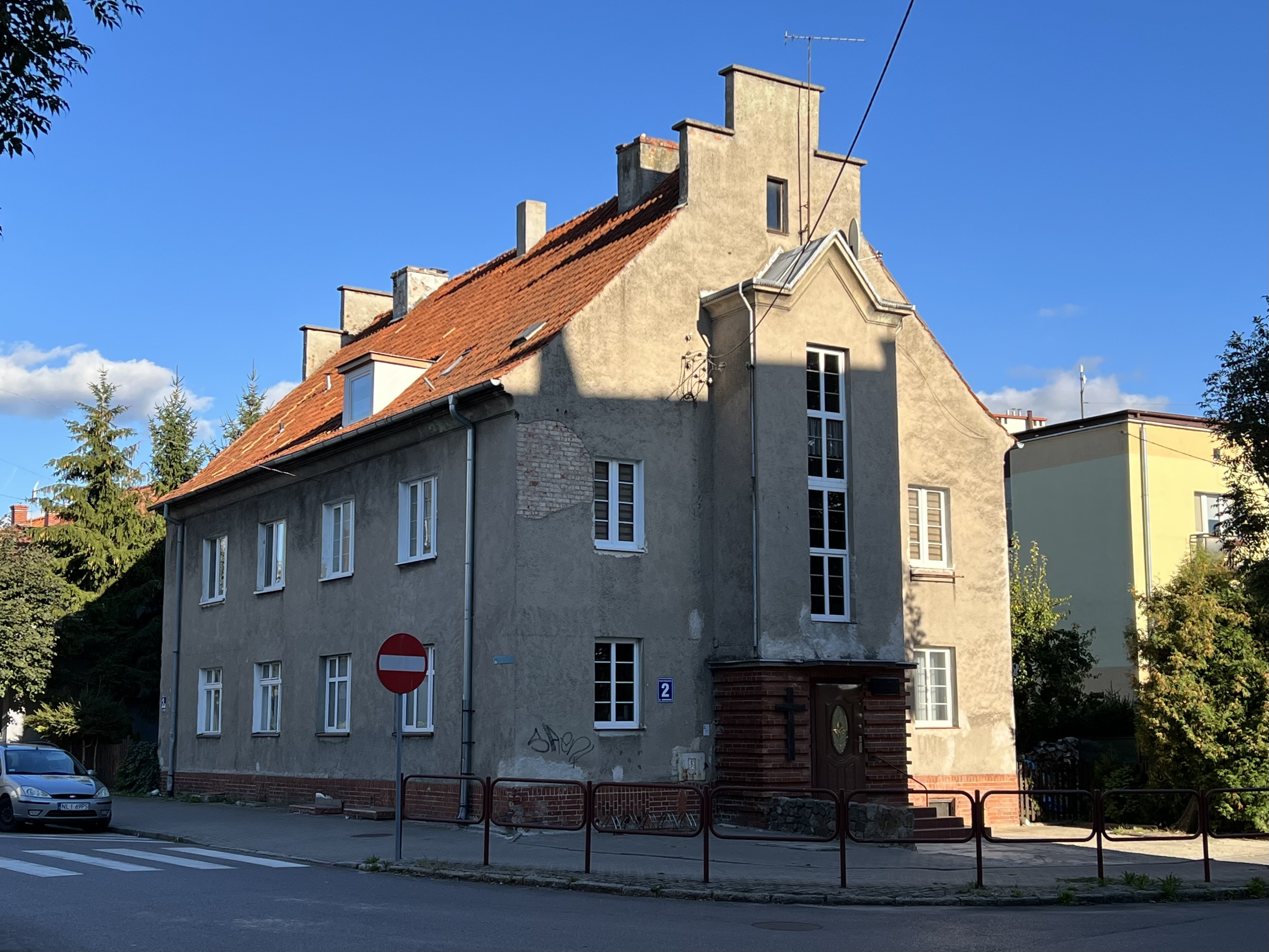
Church of Christ in Lidzbark Warmiński

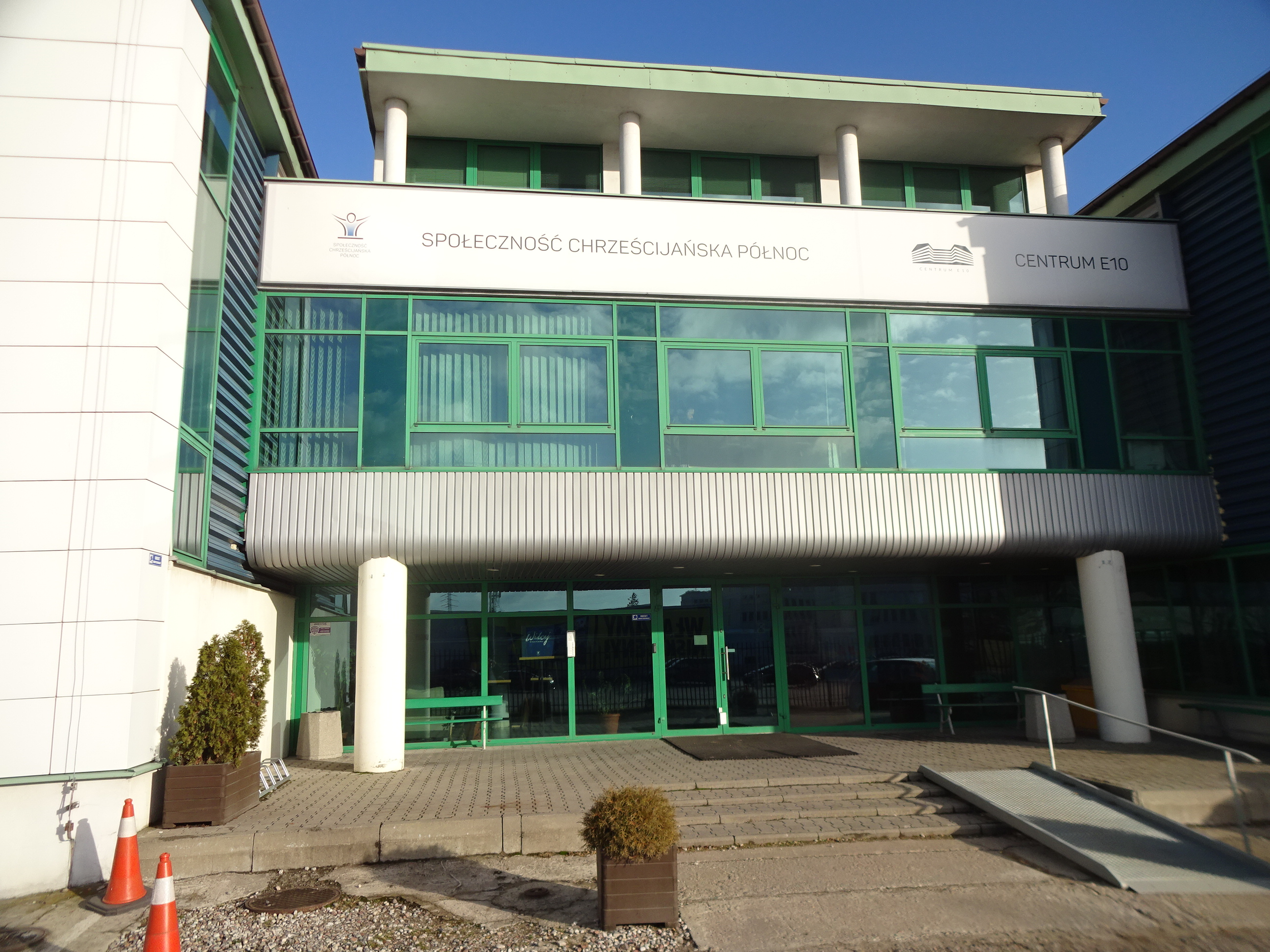
Headquarters of Christian Community "North" in Warsaw

Local communities include:

- Biała Podlaska – Church of Christ "Salvation in Jesus", with a mission station at Międzyleś
- Białogard – Church of Christ in Białogard
- Bielsk Podlaski – Church of Christ in Bielsk Podlaski
- Ciechanów – Christian Community in Ciechanów
- Dąbrowa Górnicza – Christian Community in Dąbrowa Górnicza
- Działdowo – Christian Community in Działdowo
- Garwolin – Christian Community in Garwolin
- Gdynia-Orłowo – Christian Community in Gdynia
- Głogów – Christian Community in Głogów
- Grudziądz – Christian Community in Grudziądz
- Gryfice – Church of Christ in Gryfice
- Jaworzno – Church of Christ in Jaworzno
- Katowice – Christian Community in Katowice
- Kołobrzeg – Church of Christ in Kołobrzeg
- Koszalin – Church of Christ in Koszalin
- Kraków – Church of Christ "Holy Land" in Kraków
- Lidzbark Warmiński – Church of Christ in Lidzbark Warmiński
- Lidzbark Welski – Christian Community in Lidzbark
- Lublin – Christian Community "Centre"
- Łódź:
  - Christian Community TOMY in Łódź
  - Evangelical Community in Łódź
- Nysa – Church of Christ in Nysa
- Olsztyn – Christian Community in Olsztyn
- Ostróda – Church of Christ in Ostróda
- Pabianice – Church of Christ "Genesis Nova" in Pabianice
- Płock – Christian Community in Płock
- Polkowice – Church of Christ "New Life" in Polkowice
- Połczyn-Zdrój – Church of Christ in Połczyn-Zdrój
- Radom – Christian Community in Radom
- Rybnik – Church of Christ in Rybnik
- Rzeszów – Church of Christ "Christian Revival Church CRC"
- Sandomierz – Christian Community in Sandomierz (Christian Community "Golgotha")
- Siemiatycze – Church of Christ in Siemiatycze
- Sosnowiec – Church of Christ in Sosnowiec
- Tomaszów Mazowiecki – Christian Community TOMY in Tomaszów Mazowiecki
- Warsaw:
  - Church of Christ "Grace Church"
  - Church of Christ "International Christian Fellowship"
  - Church of Christ "Life Church"
  - Christian Community "God's Peace"
  - Christian Community "HIS Church"
  - Christian Community "Kingdom Life"
  - Christian Community "North"
  - Christian Community "South"
  - Christian Community "Puławska"
  - Christian Community "Wilanów"
  - Christian Community "West"
- Wrocław – Christian Community in Wrocław
- Wyszków – Christian Community in Wyszków

== Statistics ==
=== Data from denominational surveys ===
Membership, congregations, and clergy of the Church of Christ in Poland as reported to the Central Statistical Office
Year	Members	Congregations	Churches/Chapels	Clergy
1989	2,492	21	28	50
1990	3,297	50	29	51
1991	3,471	26	30	60
1992	3,543	26	30	65
1994	3,550	26	31	65
1995	3,580	26	31	66
1996	3,645	27	31	66
1998	3,875	27		63
1999	3,942	25		60
2000	4,291	25	28	63
2001	4,886	25		75
2002	5,092	25		80
2003	5,233	31		84
2004	5,527	33		85
2005	5,673	35	33	93
2006	5,858	35	33	97
2007	5,815	36	34	103
2008	4,825	36	34	102
2010	4,927	38	33	112
2011	4,252	38	30	118
2012	4,518	37	30	125
2015	5,138	39	28	366
2016	5,361	41	28	329
2017	5,869	38	29	360
2018	6,326	40	29	362
2019	6,540	43	31	362
2020	6,645	44	31	365
2021	6,048	41	27	334
2022	6,821	48		492
2023	6,650	48		490

=== Census data ===
Declarations of affiliation in national censuses
Census	Declarations
2011 census	860
2021 census	2,072
