= Osinki =

Osinki may refer to:

- Osinki, Lublin Voivodeship (east Poland)
- Osinki, Siemiatycze County in Podlaskie Voivodeship (north-east Poland)
- Osinki, Suwałki County in Podlaskie Voivodeship (north-east Poland)
- Osinki, Masovian Voivodeship (east-central Poland)
- Osinki, Russia, name of several inhabited localities in Russia
