= Union of Churches of Christ =

Former Polish evangelical denomination

- Zjednoczenie Kościołów Chrystusowych (Polish)
- Orientation: Protestantism
- Founder: Konstanty Jaroszewicz
- Origin: 1928; Poland
- Branched from: Churches of Christ
- Merged into: United Evangelical Church (1953)

The Union of Churches of Christ (Polish: Zjednoczenie Kościołów Chrystusowych) was an evangelical denomination in Poland, active from 1928 to 1953, as part of the Churches of Christ movement. Its congregations were incorporated into the United Evangelical Church from 1953 to 1988. In 1988, these congregations formed a separate registered denomination, initially named the Church of Christian Congregations, now known as the Church of Christ in Poland.

== Second Polish Republic ==
The pioneer of the Churches of Christ in Poland was Konstanty Jaroszewicz, who returned to Poland in late 1921 as an ordained preacher. In May 1923, the first baptism of several believers took place. In autumn 1924, Jaroszewicz and his wife relocated to Kobryn, where they purchased a property with a large house and built a house of prayer the following year, establishing a mission center for the Churches of Christ. Congregations were primarily formed in the eastern borderlands of the Second Polish Republic, among people of Orthodox background, with the majority in the Wołyń and Polesie voivodeships. The first congregations were registered starting in 1926, based on a Tsarist decree regarding the registration of "sectarian communities".

Initially, Jaroszewicz operated under the "International Christian Mission", the early name for the forming community. After 1926, the name "Mission of Evangelical Christians in Poland" was adopted. In 1928, 30 congregations met in Kobryn to establish the Union of Churches of Christ. The board, authorized by the congregations, consisted of Konstanty Jaroszewicz (president), Jan Bukowicz (vice-president and treasurer), and Jerzy Sacewicz (secretary). The following year, the first National Conference of the Union of Churches of Christ was held in Kobryn. Annual national conferences were organized in various locations until 1939, totaling 10, with none held in 1933 due to financial difficulties.

By 1939, the Union of Churches of Christ had its headquarters in Kobryn, later moving to Brest. During the Tenth National Conference, held from 18 to 20 August 1939 in Zimno, Wołyń, some decisions were made, including reverting to the name "Church of Christ", adopting a new statute, and approving plans for a Bible College in Brest.

== World War II ==
During World War II, Union of Churches of Christ congregations were divided by administrative borders set by Nazi Germany. They were located in the General Government, East Prussia, Belarus, Ukraine, and the Reich. In the General Government, they joined the Union of Non-German Evangelical Free Church Congregations, which united some evangelical communities. Wartime restrictions on freedom of assembly led some congregations to join denominations tolerated by the occupying authorities, others operated clandestinely, and some suspended activities.

== Post-war period ==
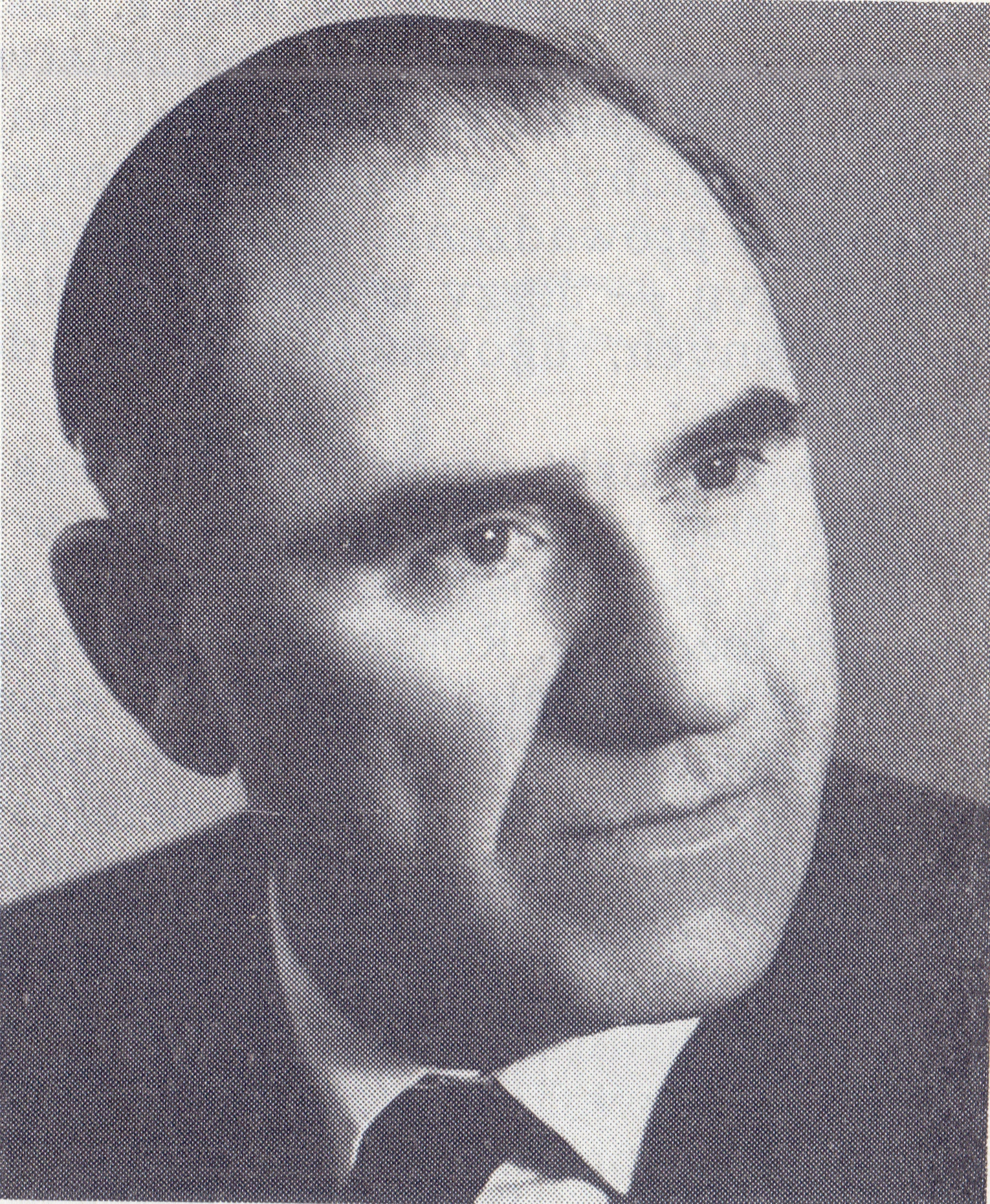
Paweł Bajeński

After World War II, the new international order left 72 Union of Churches of Christ congregations in the Soviet Union, where they were absorbed into the All-Union Council of Evangelical Christians-Baptists. In Poland, the Union of Churches of Christ congregations joined the Baptist Christian Church of the Republic of Poland in 1945. However, tensions arose between the leadership of the Baptist Christian Church of the Republic of Poland and Union of Churches of Christ leaders, led by Jerzy Sacewicz, who maintained an alternative administrative structure for former Union of Churches of Christ congregations.

In August 1946, the Eleventh Extraordinary Conference of the Union of Churches of Christ was held, deciding to reactivate the Union of Churches of Christ as an independent church. A new Supreme Council was elected, comprising Jerzy Sacewicz (president), Bolesław Winnik (vice-president and treasurer), Mikołaj Korniluk (secretary), and members Nikon Jakoniuk, Paweł Bajeński, Szymon Sacała, Konstanty Sacewicz, Teodor Lewczuk, and Józef Muranty. Konstanty Jaroszewicz, then residing in the United States, was named honorary president and international representative.

In November 1946, the former Union of Churches of Christ community withdrew from the Baptist Christian Church of the Republic of Poland. The Union of Churches of Christ of the Evangelical Faith in Poland resumed operations, with the following congregations:

- 4 in Białystok Voivodeship (Siemiatycze, Boćki, Milejczyce, Grodzisk)
- 8 in Masurian Voivodeship (Olsztyn, Lidzbark Warmiński, Kętrzyn, Mrągowo, Rumy, Świętajno, Ruskowo, Pasłęk)
- 1 in Gdańsk
- 1 in Sosnowiec
- 1 in Muratyń (Lublin Voivodeship).

In 1948, publishing activities began, including the monthly magazine Jedność (2,000 copies) and Śpiewnik Kościoła Chrystusowego (10,000 copies). Władysław Kołodziej served as editor-in-chief of Jedność.

In September 1950, the Security Service arrested church clergy and lay workers, including the entire church council: Jerzy Sacewicz (president), Mikołaj Korniluk (secretary), Bolesław Winnik (treasurer), Paweł Bajeński, and Nikon Jakoniuk (board members).

In 1951, a Union of Churches of Christ conference in Inowrocław elected a new board: Paweł Bajeński (president), Konstanty Sacewicz (secretary), and Nikon Jakoniuk (treasurer). The church had approximately 3,000 members, 24 congregations, 53 outposts, 12 chapels, and 6 prayer halls.

== Bibliography ==
- Tomaszewski, Henryk Ryszard (1991). Wyznania typu ewangeliczno-baptystycznego wchodzące w skład Zjednoczonego Kościoła Ewangelicznego w latach 1945-1956 [Evangelical-Baptist Denominations within the United Evangelical Church, 1945–1956] (in Polish).
