= Paweł Bajeński =

Polish evangelical activist

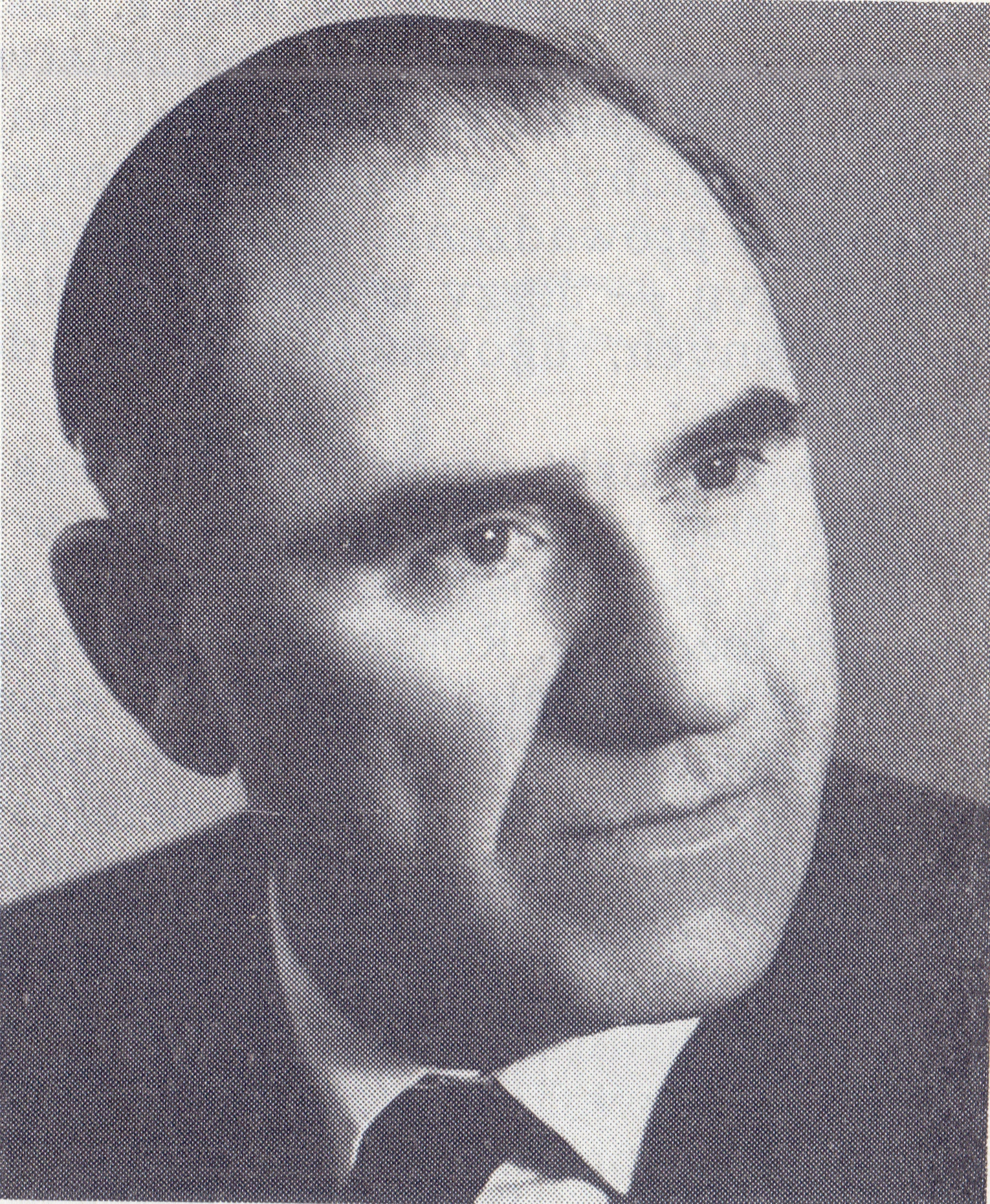
- Born: 23 December 1908; Chańki
- Died: 27 November 1971 (aged 62); Warsaw
- Burial place: Evangelical Reformed Cemetery, Warsaw
- Religion: Christianity
- Church: Union of Churches of Christ, United Evangelical Church in Poland

Paweł Bajeński (23 December 1908 – 27 November 1971) was a Polish evangelical activist during the Polish People's Republic. He led the Union of Churches of Christ from 1951 to 1953 and served on the Presidium of the United Evangelical Church from 1953 to 1962. A strong advocate for cooperation among evangelical groups, he faced surveillance and arrest by the Security Service in 1950.

== Biography ==
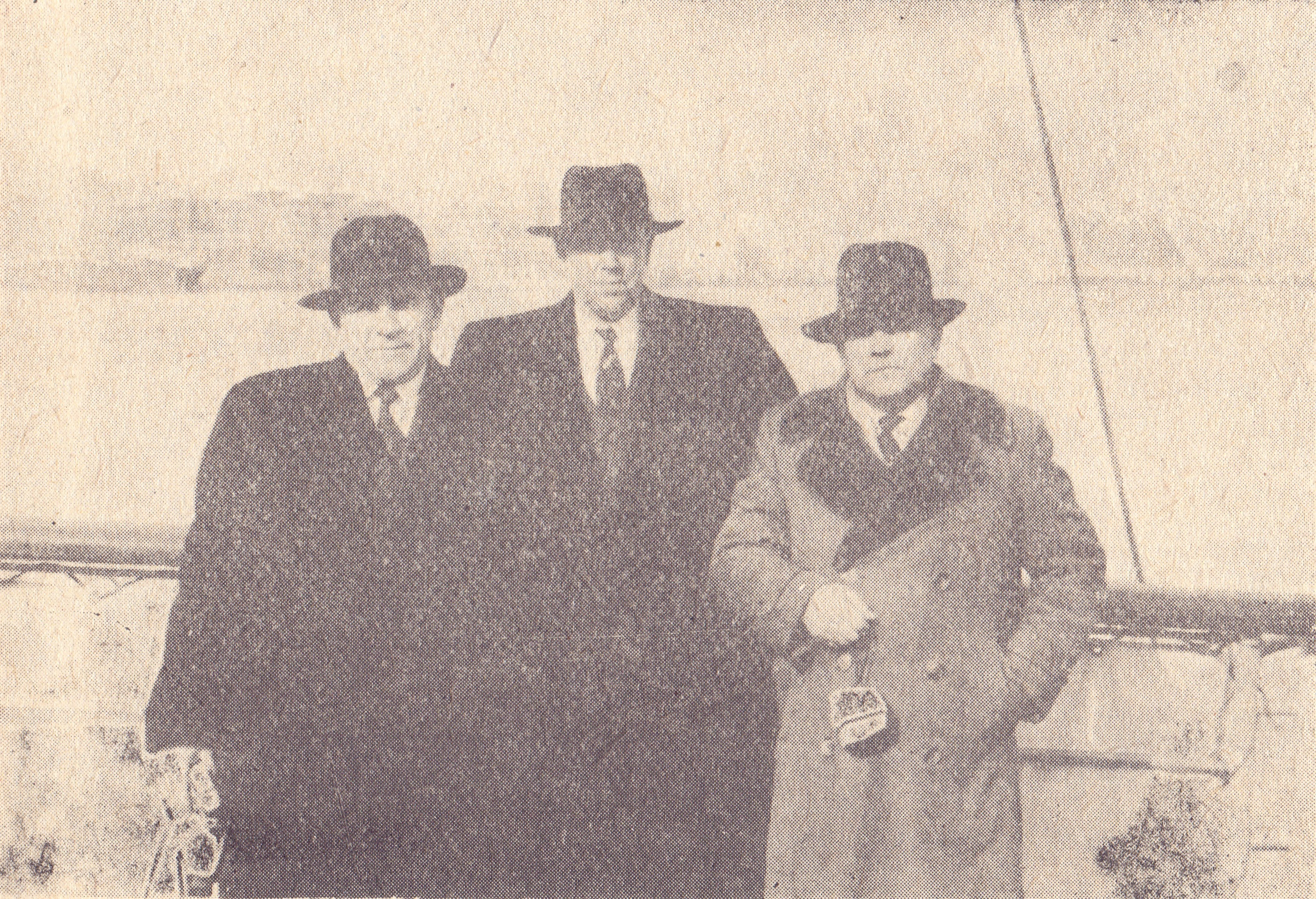
Trip to Canada in 1958 aboard the SS Atlantic; from left: Paweł Bajeński, Teodor Maksymowicz, Sergiusz Waszkiewicz

Paweł Bajeński was born on 23 December 1908 in the village of Chańki, near Milejczyce, to a farming family.

In 1915, his family fled to Russia during the mass exile, staying until 1922. There, he completed a Russian gymnasium. Upon returning to Poland, he joined the Churches of Christ and was baptised in 1928 by Jerzy Sacewicz. After military service in 1930, he became a preacher in the Milejczyce region in 1933. From 1934 to 1938, he led the youth group in the Białystok district. In January 1938, he moved to Warsaw, engaging in the congregation led by Stanisław Krakiewicz.

In 1941, he became chairman of the Lublin Voivodeship. In 1945, he relocated to Gdańsk, establishing congregations and outposts, including one in Gdańsk itself. A proponent of evangelical unity, he worked with the Baptist Christian Church from 1945 to 1947, serving on its Supreme Council.

In August 1949, the Security Service began surveilling him. In September 1950, he was arrested alongside other evangelical leaders. Due to poor health, he was hospitalised for several months. He was released in March 1951. As the first senior leader of the Union of Churches of Christ freed, he worked to reopen sealed chapels, petitioning the Office for Religious Affairs and Ministry of Public Security. A Warsaw chapel was reopened in 1952. He convened a conference in Inowrocław, where he was elected president of the church, as Jerzy Sacewicz and Mikołaj Korniluk remained imprisoned. In 1953, he facilitated the Union's entry into the United Evangelical Church, a move Sacewicz later criticised.

From 1953 to 1962, Bajeński served as a vice-president of the United Evangelical Church and oversaw various districts (Pomeranian 1953–1956, Olsztyn and Białystok 1956–1959, Bydgoszcz and Lublin 1959–1962). His rivalry with Sacewicz led to tensions, resulting in the United Evangelical Church appointing Kazimierz Muranty as interim leader of the Puławska Street congregation in 1962. In 1965, Sacewicz became leader, with Bajeński as deputy.

In 1956, despite separatist pressures from American co-religionists, Bajeński maintained the Union's place in the United Evangelical Church. R.J. Smith of the American Church of Christ offered financial aid to form an independent church, but Bajeński declined.

He died in Warsaw on 27 November 1971 and was buried at the Evangelical Reformed Cemetery (plot 8-1-1).

== Controversies ==
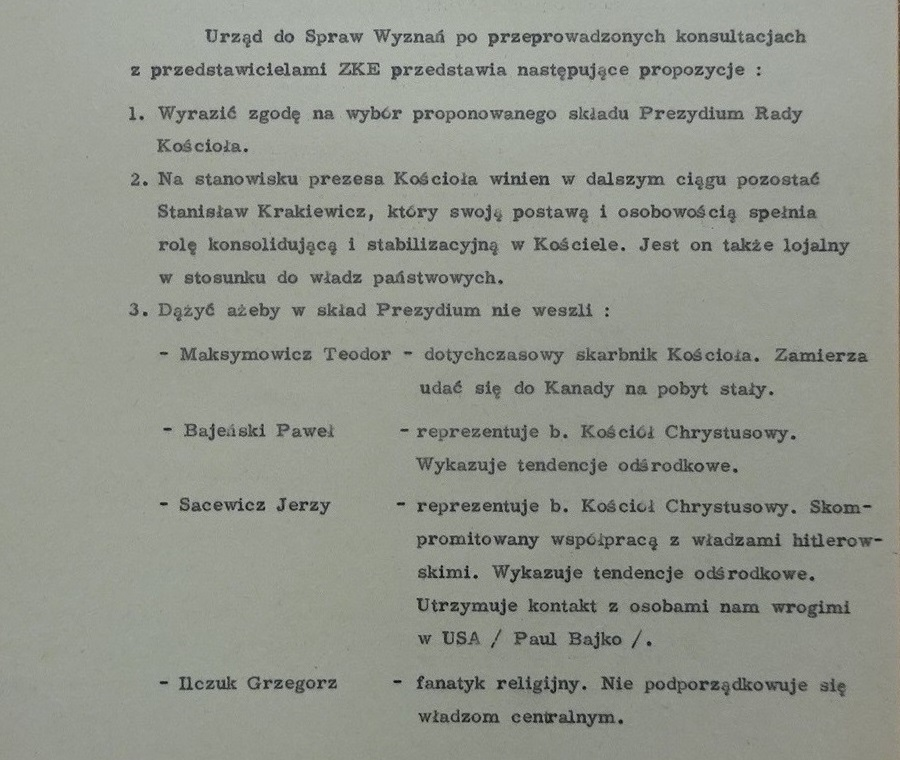
Excerpt from a 1968 note by an Office for Religious Affairs employee (AAN UdSW 131/482)

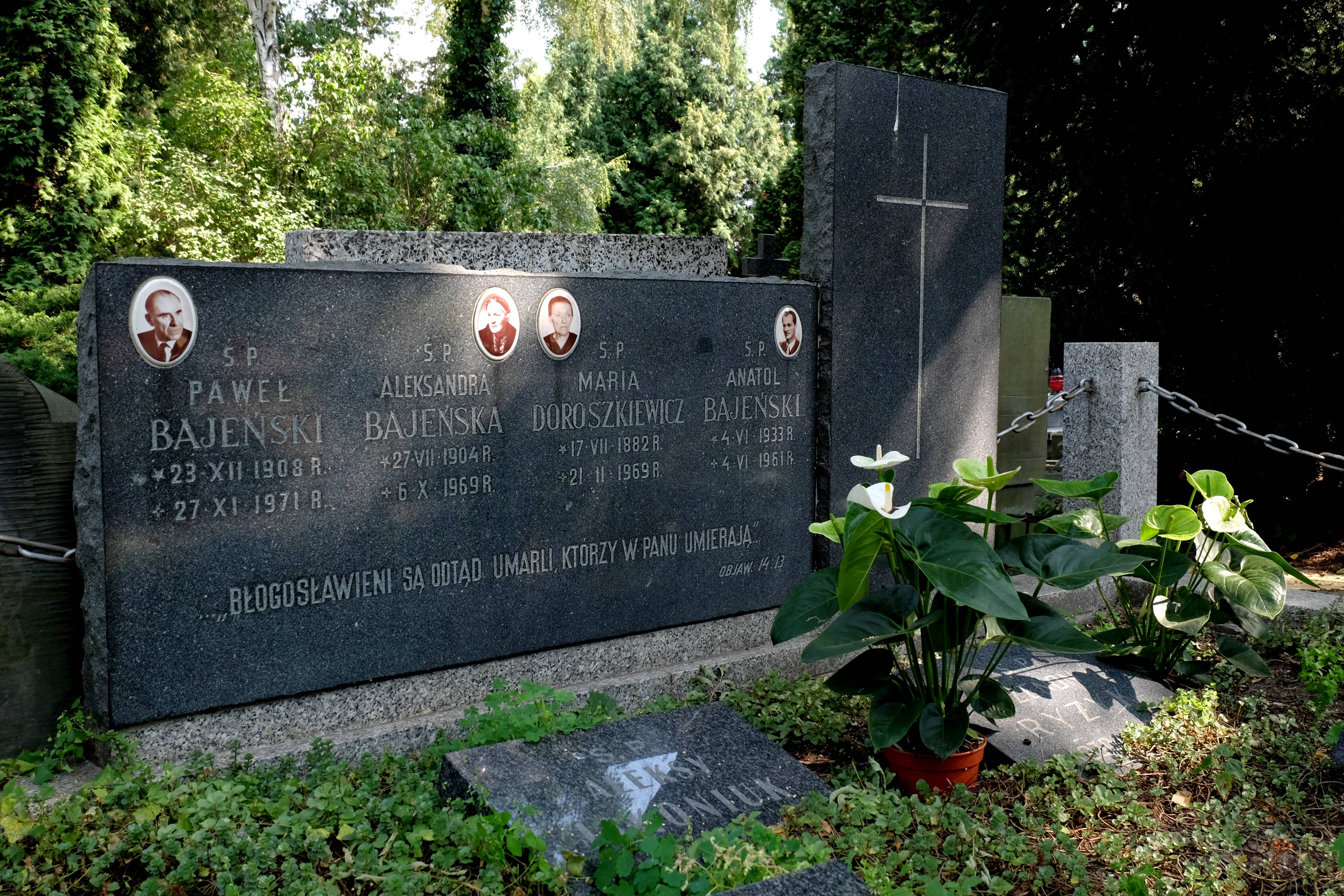
Paweł Bajeński's grave at the Evangelical Reformed Cemetery

Bajeński was noted for his deferential stance toward authorities. After his 1951 release, he used flattery in correspondence, claiming the Union operated freely under the regime. In November 1952, with Konstanty Sacewicz, he sent a telegram to the Office for Religious Affairs expressing gratitude for "religious freedom", while other church leaders remained jailed. Following Joseph Stalin's death, he wrote that it "cast a shadow of mourning over all progressive nations".

Ryszard Michalak suggested Bajeński and Stanisław Krakiewicz followed state directives to merge the Union with the United Evangelical Church. This implied collaboration with the Security Service. Tomasz Terlikowski accused Bajeński of extensive cooperation with authorities. This claim was echoed by Paweł Chojecki. The Union's publication Słowo i Życie dismissed Terlikowski's article as biased.

Wojciech Sławiński, after reviewing Institute of National Remembrance archives, found no evidence of collaboration, noting Bajeński was targeted for surveillance. Mirosława Weremiejewicz countered that Bajeński's pre-arrest experience with ecumenical cooperation, including during the German occupation and in the post-war Polish Baptist Church, shaped his approach to unity. Leszek Jańczuk confirmed Bajeński was not registered as an informant.

Bajeński's grandson, Andrzej W. Bajeński, stated that Paweł consistently supported evangelical unity, viewing like-minded believers as brothers in faith, though he remained cautious toward other Christian traditions.

== Bibliography ==
- Weremiejewicz, Mirosława Regina (2014). Kościół Chrystusowy w Polsce w latach 1921–2006 [Church of Christ in Poland, 1921–2006] (in Polish). Toruń: Duet. ISBN 978-83-62558-81-0.
