= Gmina Milejczyce =

Gmina Milejczyce Milejczyce Commune
- Gmina
- Coat of arms
- Interactive map of Gmina Milejczyce
- Coordinates (Milejczyce): 52°31′N 23°8′E
- Country: Poland
- Voivodeship: Podlaskie
- County: Siemiatycze
- Seat: Milejczyce

Area
  - Total: 151.79 km^{2} (58.61 sq mi)

Population (2006)
  - Total: 2,209
  - Density: 14.55/km^{2} (37.69/sq mi)

Gmina Milejczyce is a rural gmina (administrative district) in Siemiatycze County, Podlaskie Voivodeship, in north-eastern Poland. Its seat is the village of Milejczyce, which lies approximately 21 kilometres (13 mi) north-east of Siemiatycze and 67 km (42 mi) south of the regional capital Białystok.

The gmina covers an area of 151.79 square kilometres (58.6 sq mi), and as of 2006 its total population is 2,209.

== Villages ==
Gmina Milejczyce contains the villages and settlements of Biełki, Borowiki, Chańki, Choroszczewo, Choroszczewo-Kolonia, Gołubowszczyzna, Grabarka, Jałtuszczyki, Klimkowicze, Lewosze, Lubiejki, Miedwieżyki, Mikulicze, Milejczyce, Nowosiółki, Osinki, Pokaniewo, Pokaniewo-Kolonia, Rogacze and Sobiatyno.

== Neighbouring gminas ==
Gmina Milejczyce is bordered by the gminas of Boćki, Czeremcha, Dziadkowice, Kleszczele and Nurzec-Stacja.
