= Miedwieżyki =

- Village
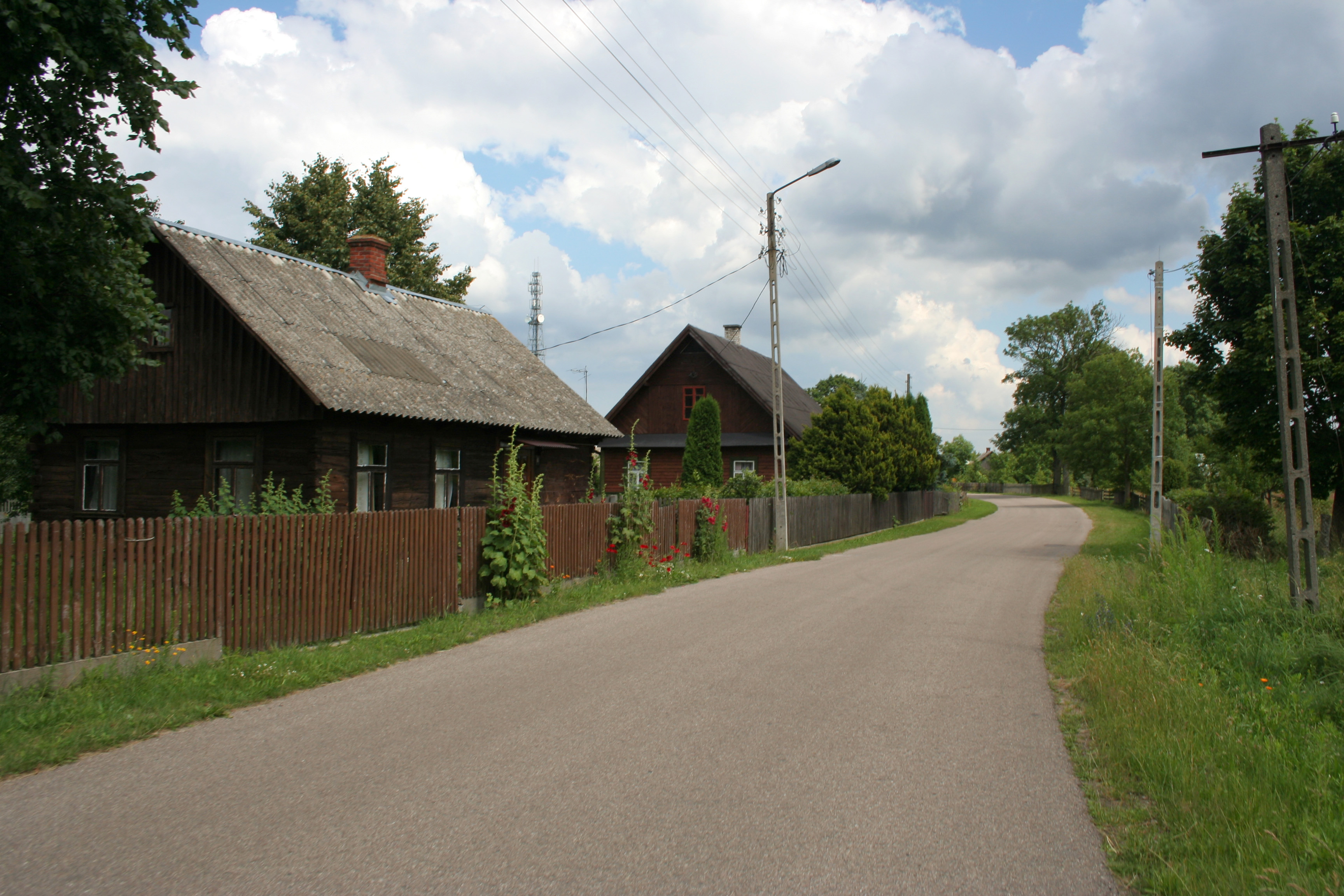

- Location within Poland
- Coordinates: 52°30′N 23°16′E
- Country: Poland
- Voivodeship: Podlaskie
- County: Siemiatycze
- Gmina: Milejczyce
- Time zone: UTC+1 (CET)
  - Summer (DST): UTC+2 (CEST)

Miedwieżyki (Polish pronunciation: [mjɛdvjɛˈʐɨkʲi]) is a village in the administrative district of Gmina Milejczyce, within Siemiatycze County, Podlaskie Voivodeship, in eastern Poland.

== History ==
Three Polish citizens were murdered by Nazi Germany in the village during World War II.
