= Gołubowszczyzna =

- Village
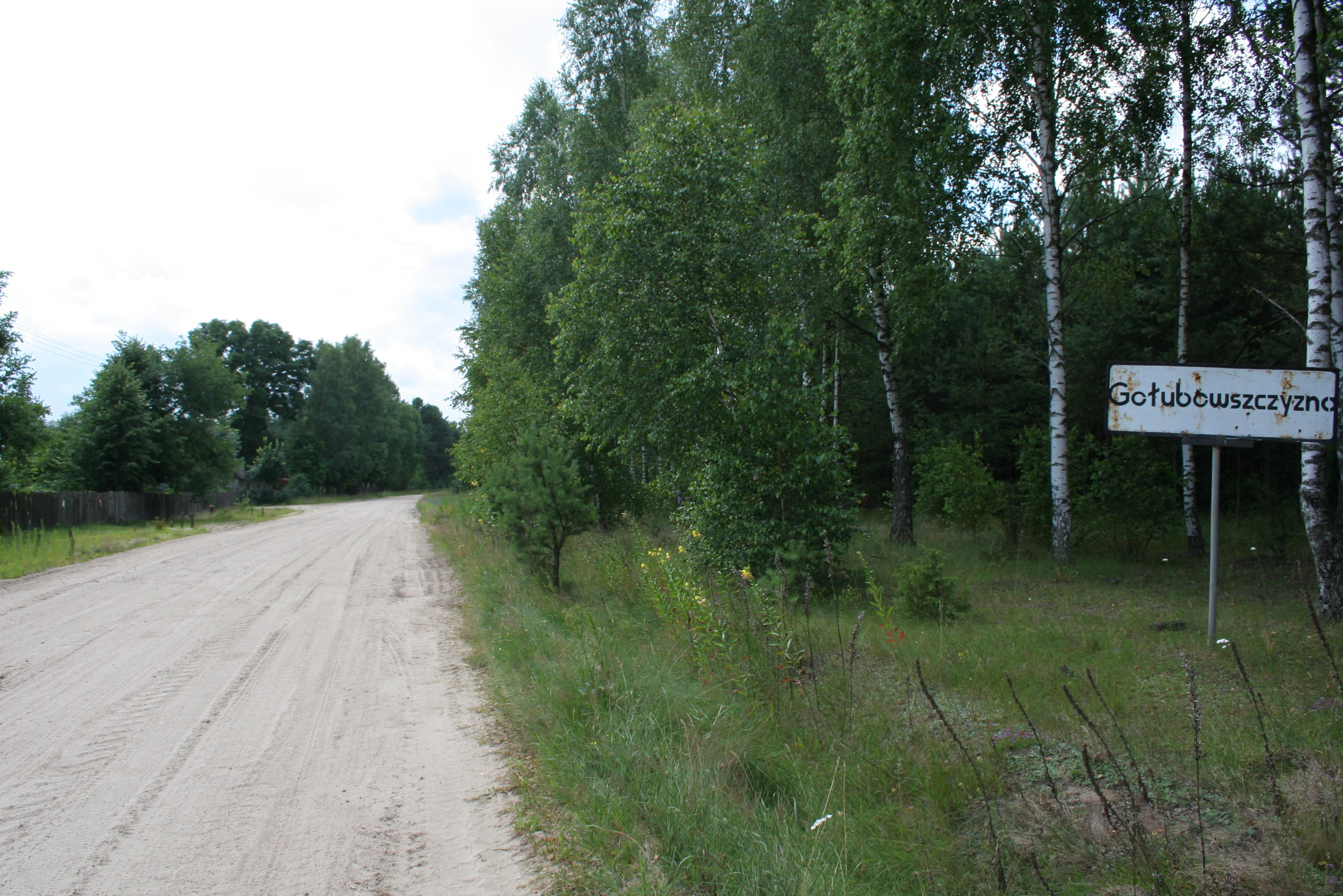
- Road sign in Gołubowszczyzna

- Location within Poland
- Coordinates: 52°29′38″N 23°00′38″E
- Country: Poland
- Voivodeship: Podlaskie
- County: Siemiatycze
- Gmina: Milejczyce

Gołubowszczyzna [ɡɔwubɔfʂˈt͡ʂɨzna] is a village in the administrative district of Gmina Milejczyce, within Siemiatycze County, Podlaskie Voivodeship, in north-eastern Poland.
