= Biełki =

Village in Gmina Milejczyce, Poland

- Village
- Location within Poland
- Coordinates: 52°33′56″N 23°9′21″E
- Country: Poland
- Voivodeship: Podlaskie
- County: Siemiatycze
- Gmina: Milejczyce

Biełki [ˈbʲɛu̯kʲi] is a village in the administrative district of Gmina Milejczyce, within Siemiatycze County, Podlaskie Voivodeship, in north-eastern Poland.
