= Mikulicze =

- Village
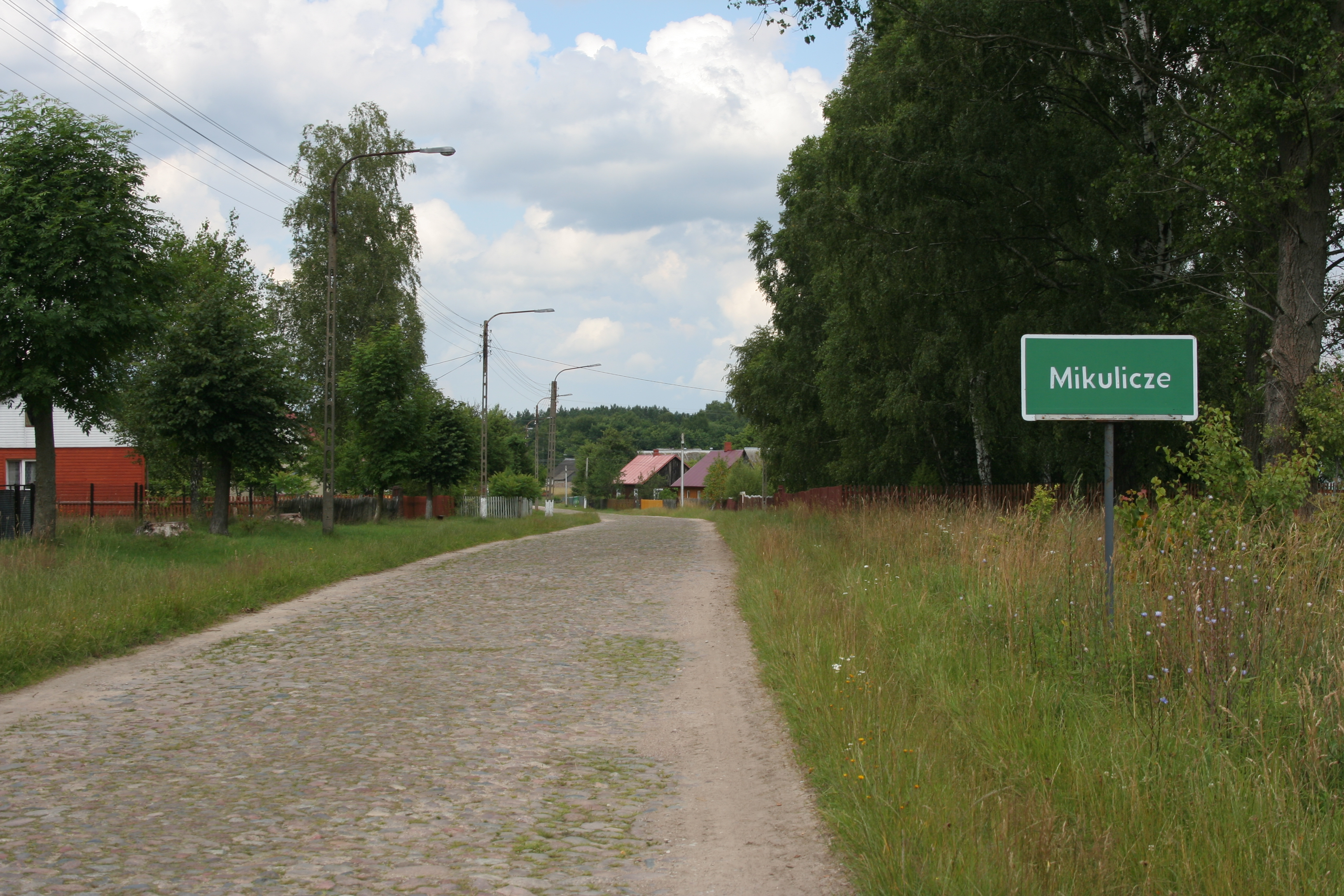
- Entering the village

- Location within Poland
- Coordinates: 52°31′N 23°14′E
- Country: Poland
- Voivodeship: Podlaskie
- County: Siemiatycze
- Gmina: Milejczyce

Mikulicze [mʲikuˈlʲit͡ʂɛ] is a village in the administrative district of Gmina Milejczyce, in Siemiatycze County, Podlaskie Voivodeship, in northeastern Poland. It is the birthplace of Polish soldier Władysław Grydziuszko.
