= St. Barbara's Church, Milejczyce =

Orthodox church in Milejczyce, Poland

St. Barbara's Church
- Cerkiew św. Barbary
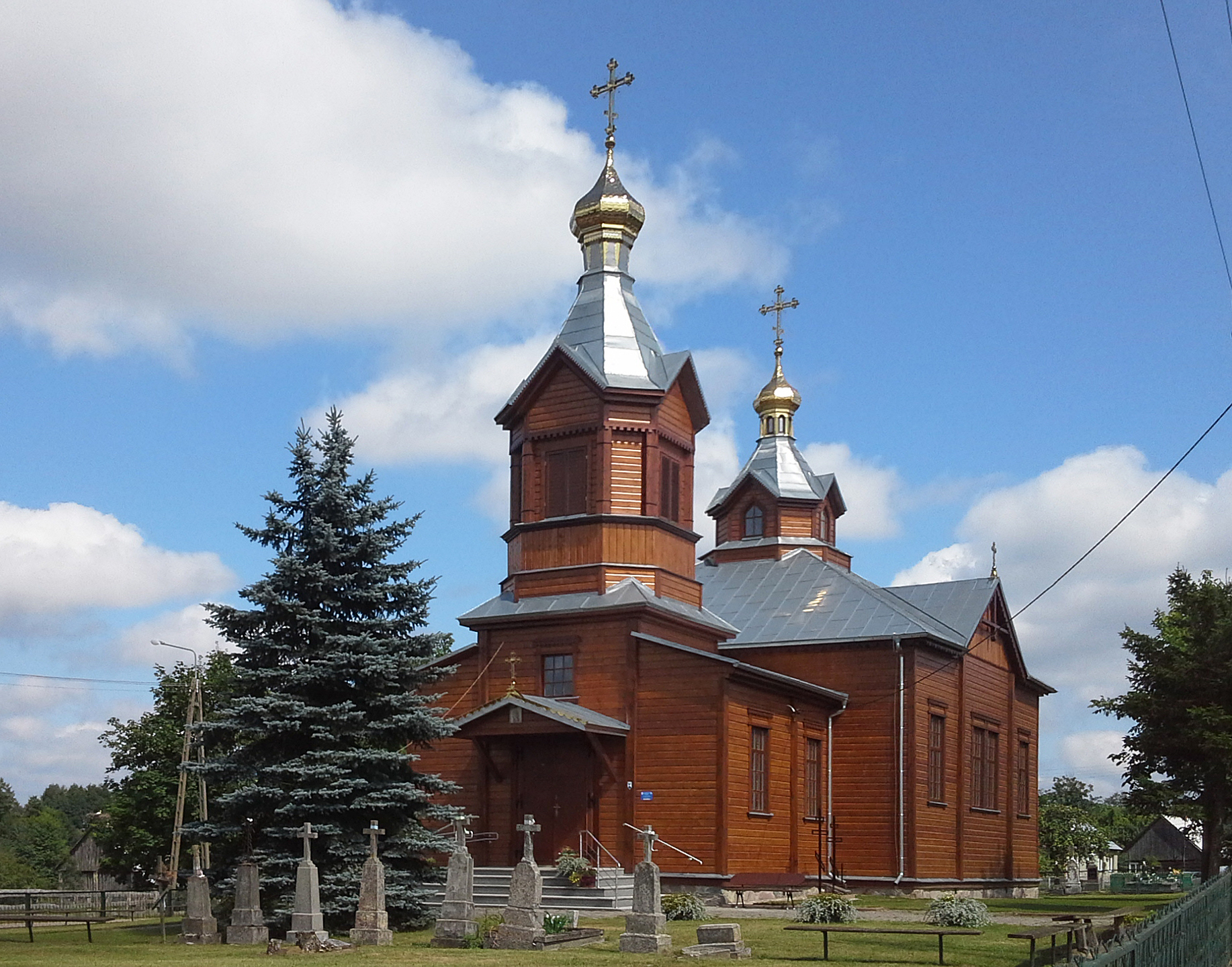
- St. Barbara's Church
- 52°31′12.0″N 23°07′38.0″E
- Location: Milejczyce
- Country: Poland
- Denomination: Eastern Orthodoxy
- Churchmanship: Polish Orthodox Church

History
- Status: active Orthodox church
- Dedication: Saint Barbara

Architecture
- Completed: 19th century

Specifications
- Materials: wood

Administration
- Diocese: Diocese of Warsaw and Bielsk

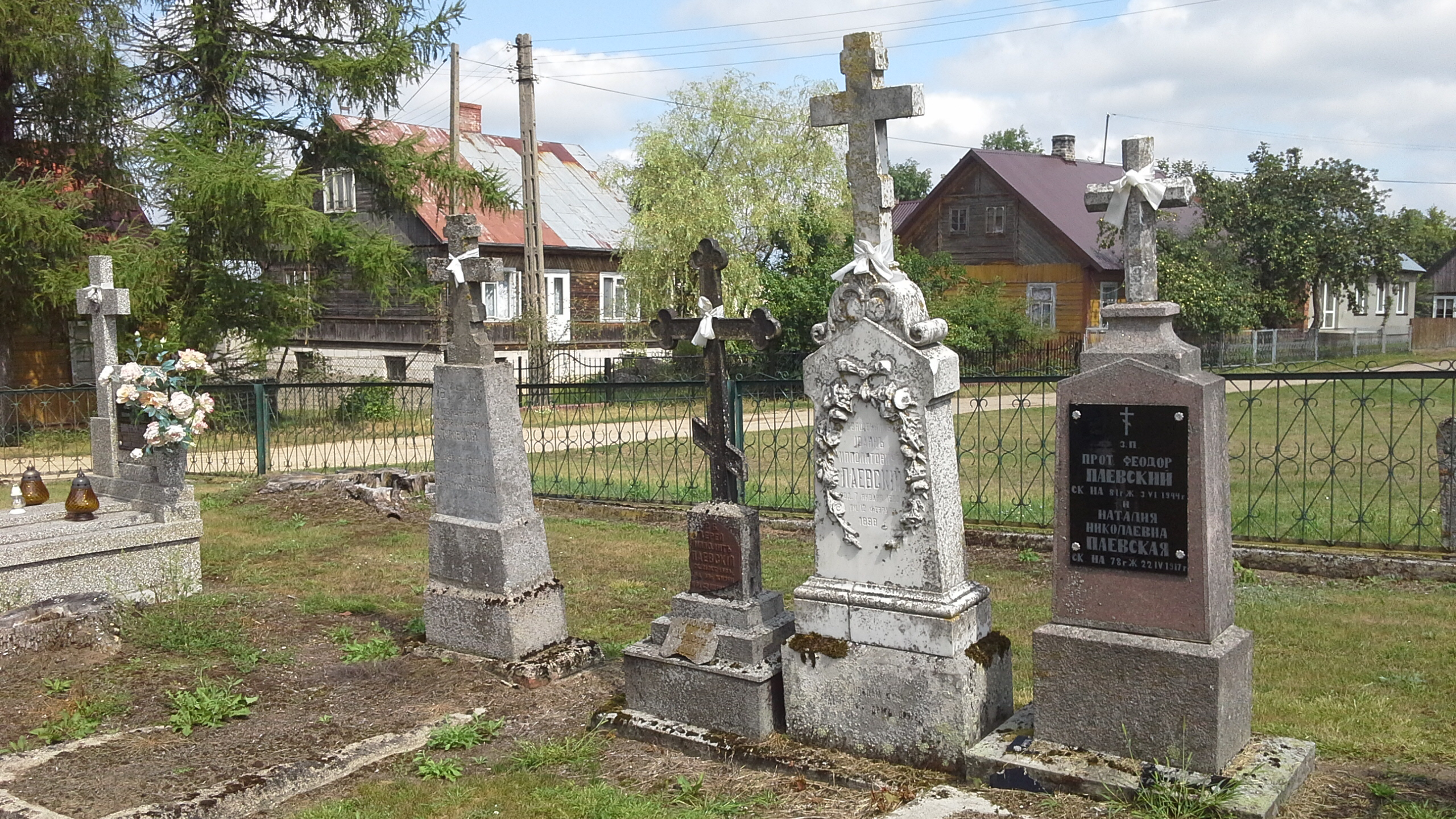
19th- and 20th-century tombstones of clergymen from the Pajewski family, serving in the local parish, located on the church grounds

St. Barbara's Church is an Orthodox parish church in Milejczyce that belongs to the Kleszczele Deanery of the Diocese of Warsaw and Bielsk of the Polish Orthodox Church.

The Orthodox parish of St. Barbara in Milejczyce existed at the beginning of the 16th century. In the following century, it accepted the Union of Brest despite initial resistance from local clergy and parishioners. In the 18th century, the church dedicated to St. Barbara in Milejczyce (the town also had a church dedicated to St. Nicholas) was described as severely damaged. In 1839, following the decisions of the Synod of Polotsk, the local parish was incorporated into the Russian Orthodox Church. In 1859, the St. Barbara's Church in Milejczyce was completely destroyed in a fire. A new church was built between 1899 and 1900, and it has served as the parish church since its consecration.

The church is a notable center for the veneration of St. Barbara, housing a 17th-century image of the saint.

The building is situated on St. Barbara Street, within a plot surrounded by a low, modern fence. Nearby the church are several tombstones and a few scattered trees.

== History ==
The Orthodox parish in Milejczyce existed at the beginning of the 16th century, as evidenced by records from 1516 indicating the presence of a freestanding church. In the 16th century, Milejczyce may have also had an Orthodox monastic center. In 1529, King Sigismund I the Old endowed two Orthodox churches in this town and guaranteed their free operation, similar to the privilege granted to the Catholic Church of St. Stanislaus in Milejczyce.

At the end of the 16th century, the vast majority of Milejczyce's residents were Orthodox and reacted negatively to the Union of Brest. The local protopope, Leontij, participated in the council of Union opponents in Brest and signed its final act. Despite this, by the mid-17th century at the latest, the pastoral station belonged to the Uniate Diocese of Volodymyr and Brest.

In 1725, a visitation protocol of the Uniate parish in Milejczyce recorded that the local wooden church was in very poor condition, prompting a reprimand for the parson's negligence. The church's inventory included 19 "Moscow images", i.e., icons created before the Union of Brest.

The Milejczyce church remained a Uniate church until the Synod of Polotsk of 1839, after which, like all churches of this denomination in Podlachia, it became part of the Russian Orthodox Church. It existed until 1859 when it was destroyed in a fire in Milejczyce. (Note: In Milejczyce, there was also a second church dedicated to St. Nicholas, which existed until 1887. Additionally, in 1865, the Russian authorities transferred the Catholic Church of St. Stanislaus to the Orthodox community, and it was reconsecrated as the Church of the Holy Spirit. This building remained under the control of the Orthodox parish until 1919 when it was returned to the Catholics. The Church of St. Nicholas was relocated to Zubacze in 1887. Its dedication was adopted by a small 19th-century wooden cemetery chapel (Kołomajska-Saeed (1996, p. 40)).)

The current functioning church was built between 1899 and 1900. The church operated until 1915, when, in August of that year, the Orthodox inhabitants of the village fled during mass deportation. The church bells were taken to Minsk, and the church's furnishings were buried in the local Orthodox cemetery near the tomb of Father Alexander Bursa. The building was reopened for worship after 1918, following the return of the Orthodox community.

During the interwar period, the Milejczyce parish belonged to the Diocese of Warsaw and Chełm, and after World War II, it became part of the Diocese of Warsaw and Bielsk, within the Siemiatycze Deanery. In 1951, the church had 1,278 parishioners, and by 1969, this number had decreased to between 1,209 and 1,215. In both instances, the Milejczyce parish was one of the largest in the deanery, ranking fifth in 1951 and second in 1969.

In 1980, the building was registered as a historical monument under number 497. In 2013, a major renovation of the church was undertaken, co-financed by European Union funds. The restoration included returning the church to its original color, replacing the roof, and gilding the onion-shaped domes.

== Architecture ==
=== Structure ===
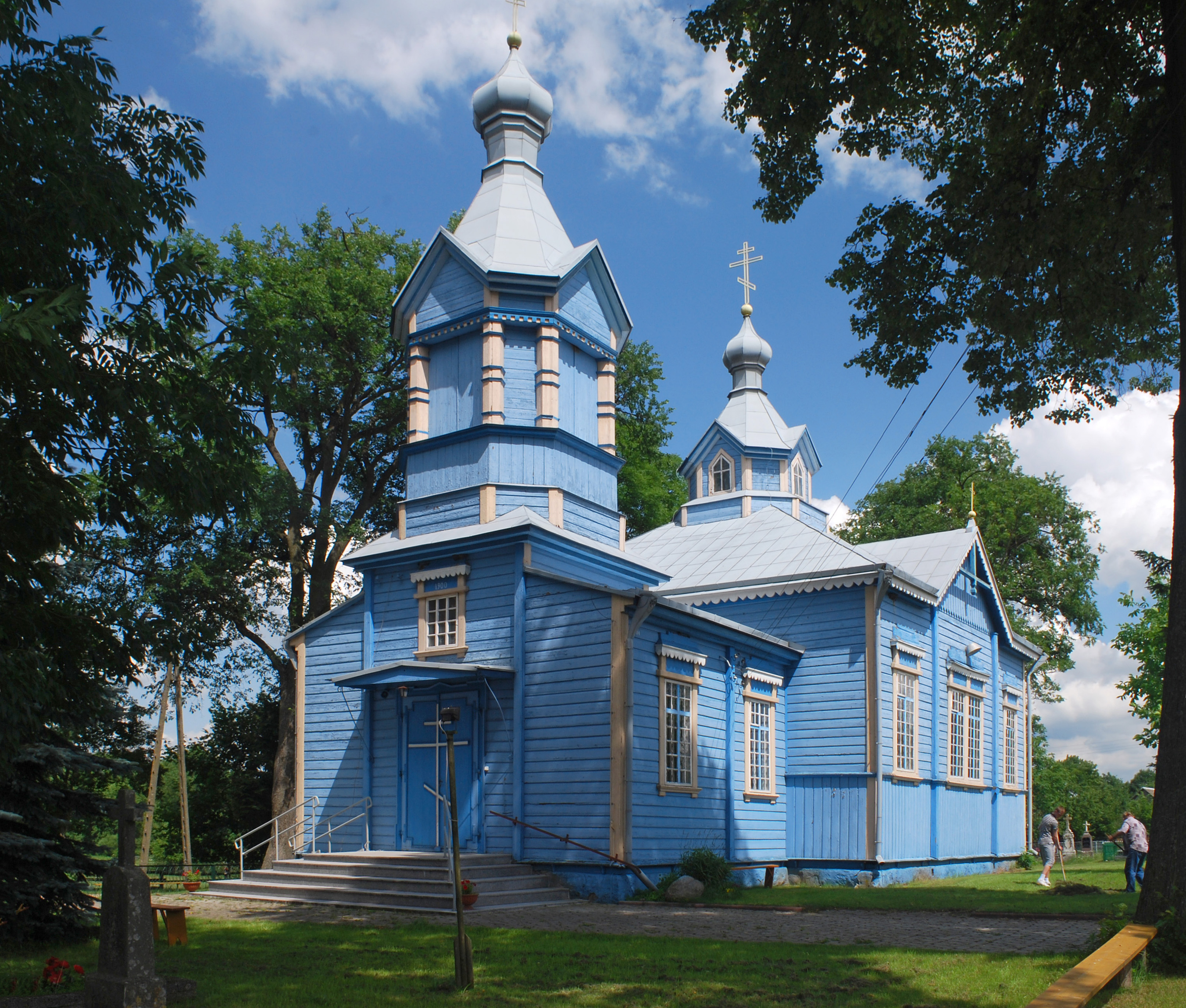
Church before the renovation

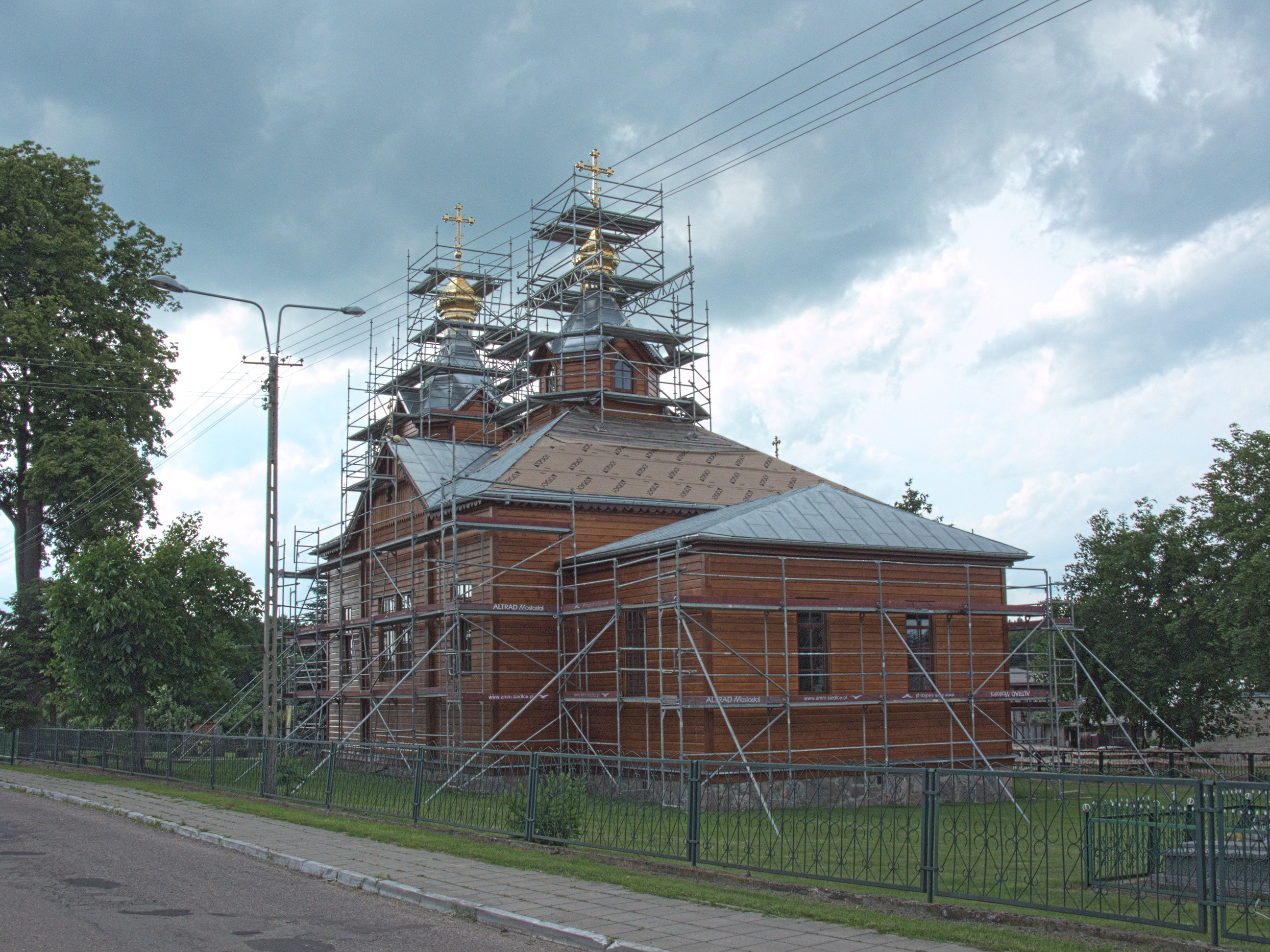
Church during the renovation in 2013

St. Barbara's Church in Milejczyce is a wooden structure, set on a stone foundation, oriented, and built using a log construction technique reinforced with formwork. Before the renovation between 2013 and 2014, the exterior was painted with oil paint. The building follows a tripartite layout. It features a square nave, and lower square-plan structures for the chancel and church porch. Above the church porch rises an octagonal tower topped with a pyramidal tented roof and an onion dome. The nave is surmounted by a tholobate crowned with an octagonal roof lantern with a pyramidal tented roof and an onion dome. The church's roofs are made of sheet metal. The nave is covered by a tented roof, the church roof by a gable roof, and the chancel by a similar gable roof. The church windows are rectangular.

=== Interior ===
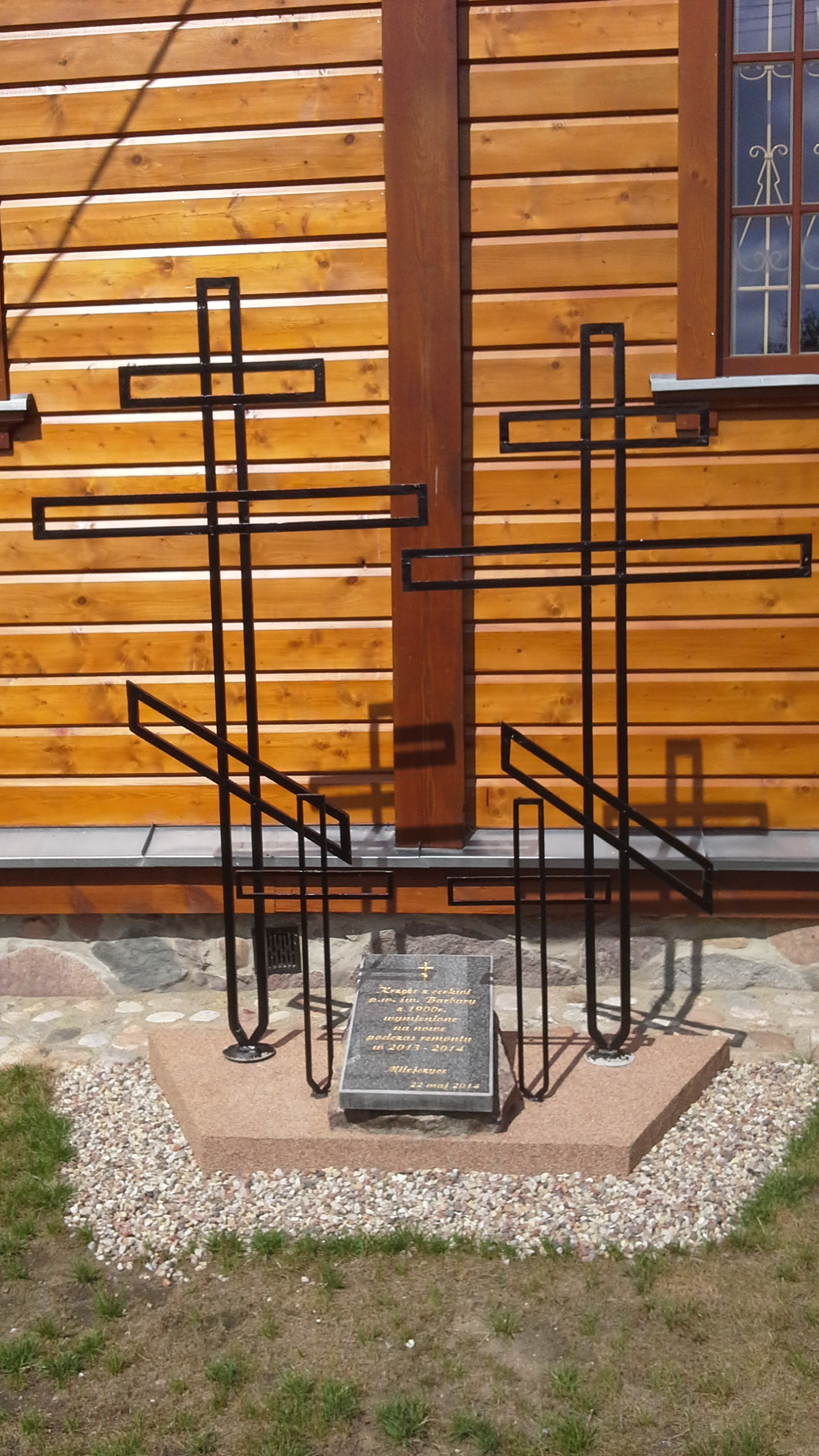
Crosses originally located on the domes of the church, placed in its vicinity in 2014

The church houses two iconostases: the main one, created around 1900 specifically for this church, and an older one from 1865, transferred from the Church of the Holy Spirit when it was returned to the Catholics. This older iconostasis is placed against the northern wall of the building. The main iconostasis includes two older, 17th-century Baroque icons of Saints Barbara and Nicholas with scenes from their lives.

In the nave of the church, there is an 18th-century icon case carved in a Baroque-Neoclassical style, containing Uniate icons: a 17th-century Hodegetria-style icon of the Virgin Mary with Child (repainted in the early 20th century) and an Immaculate Conception from the late 18th century. The church also features other Uniate icons: two 17th-century icons of Christ Pantocrator, an image of the Holy Trinity from the early 19th century, and a depiction of Simeon Stylites from the late 18th century. Additionally, there are two Latin-style paintings from the same period: (Note: Latin paintings, unrelated to icon painting, commonly appeared in the Uniate churches of Podlachia after the Synod of Zamość.) an Assumption of the Virgin Mary painted in the Baroque style in the second half of the 18th century, and a 19th-century Crucifixion.

From the second half of the 19th century, the church preserves a tabernacle with figurines of Saints Peter and Paul and angels, and plaques on the base depicting the Burial and the Last Supper. The tabernacle is topped with a glory and an enameled medallion depicting the Resurrection. The church also holds a Renaissance Revival chalice from 1871, with medallions of Christ Pantocrator, the Virgin Mary, John the Baptist, and a depiction of the Cross. A liturgical spoon from 1870, also Moscow-made, is part of the church's collection.

Older than these liturgical vessels are the processional banners. The oldest, from around the mid-18th century, features images of Saints Barbara and Nicholas. The second, from the third quarter of the 18th century, holds 19th-century icons of St. Barbara and the Virgin Mary. The third, made by a folk artist in the first half of the 19th century, includes an icon of the Virgin Mary from the same period and a 20th-century image of St. Nicholas.

The church also contains three 19th-century altar crucifixes: a silver one with Baroque elements, a brass one adorned with plaques depicting the Evangelists, Jesus Christ, and God the Father (partially damaged), and a silver one made in Moscow in the third quarter of the 19th century. From the same period are the church's neo-Baroque wedding crowns, each decorated with four medallions: the Crucifixion, Christ, the Virgin Mary, Constantine the Great, and the Crucifixion, Our Lady of the Sign, John the Evangelist, and St. Helena.

=== Icon of St. Barbara of Milejczyce ===
Since the 16th century, there has been a particularly vibrant cult of St. Barbara in Milejczyce. According to Grzegorz Sosna, there must have been an icon of St. Barbara in the local church, and its omission in the 1725 visitation records was likely a deliberate oversight. Katalog zabytków indicates that the church houses a 17th-century icon of St. Barbara, from the Uniate period. The saint is depicted frontally, to the knees, holding a martyr's palm in her right hand and a scroll with a Church Slavonic inscription in her left hand. St. Barbara wears a blue gown and an ochre cloak, with a crown on her head. Her hair is loose, and her face is oval and elongated. She is depicted against a gold background adorned with floral motifs. The image of the martyr is surrounded by smaller depictions of scenes from her life.

== Bibliography ==
- Kołomajska-Saeed, M., ed. (1996). Katalog zabytków sztuki w Polsce. Siemiatycze, Drohiczyn i okolice (in Polish). Warsaw: Instytut Sztuki Polskiej Akademii Nauk.
- Sosna, G.; Troc-Sosna, A. (2006). Święte miejsca i cudowne ikony. Prawosławne sanktuaria na Białostocczyźnie (in Polish). Białystok: Orthdruk. ISBN 83-85368-69-8.
- Urban, K. (1996). Kościół prawosławny w Polsce 1945–1970 (in Polish). Kraków: Nomos. ISBN 83-85527-35-4.
