= Lewosze =

- Village
- Location within Poland
- Coordinates: 52°30′N 23°13′E
- Country: Poland
- Voivodeship: Podlaskie
- County: Siemiatycze
- Gmina: Milejczyce

Lewosze [lɛˈvɔʂɛ] is a village in the administrative district of Gmina Milejczyce, within Siemiatycze County, Podlaskie Voivodeship, in north-eastern Poland.
