= Grabarka, Gmina Milejczyce =

Grabarka
- Village
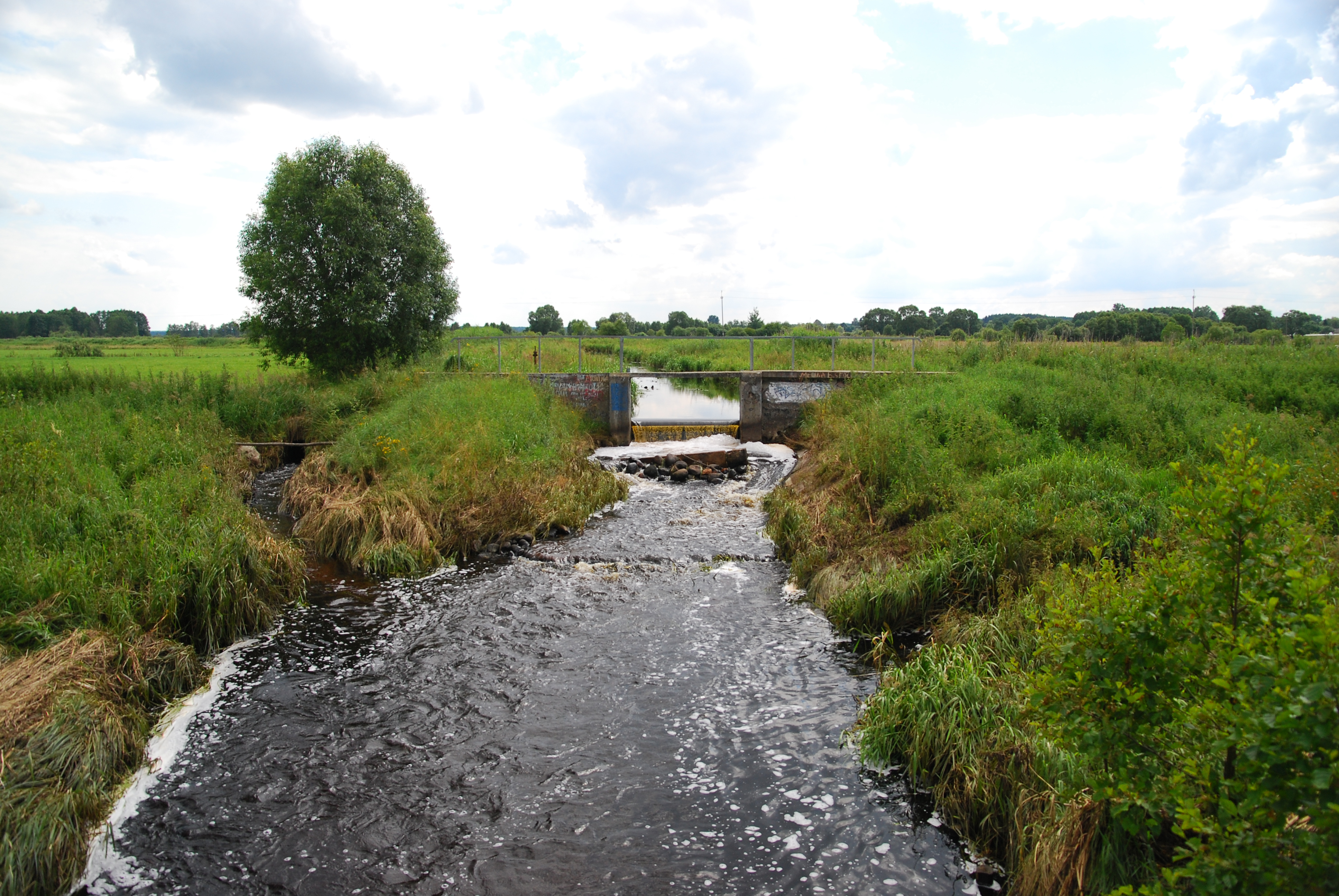
- River in Grabarka

- Location within Poland
- Coordinates: 52°31′48″N 23°05′14″E
- Country: Poland
- Voivodeship: Podlaskie
- County: Siemiatycze
- Gmina: Milejczyce

Grabarka [ɡraˈbarka] is a village in the administrative district of Gmina Milejczyce, within Siemiatycze County, Podlaskie Voivodeship, in north-eastern Poland.

According to the 1921 census, the village was inhabited by 72 people, among whom 2 were Roman Catholic, 65 Orthodox, and 3 Mosaic. At the same time, 2 inhabitants declared Polish nationality, 65 Belarusian and 3 Jewish. There were 20 residential buildings in the village.
