= Choroszczewo-Kolonia =

- Settlement
- Location within Poland
- Coordinates: 52°32′11″N 23°01′08″E
- Country: Poland
- Voivodeship: Podlaskie
- County: Siemiatycze
- Gmina: Milejczyce

Choroszczewo-Kolonia [xɔrɔʂˈt͡ʂɛvɔ kɔˈlɔɲa] is a settlement in the administrative district of Gmina Milejczyce, within Siemiatycze County, Podlaskie Voivodeship, in north-eastern Poland.
