= Pokaniewo-Kolonia =

- Village
- Location within Poland
- Coordinates: 52°30′35″N 23°2′39″E
- Country: Poland
- Voivodeship: Podlaskie
- County: Siemiatycze
- Gmina: Milejczyce
- Population: 180

Pokaniewo-Kolonia [pɔkaˈɲɛvɔ kɔˈlɔɲa] is a village in the Administrative District of Gmina Milejczyce, within Siemiatycze County, Podlaskie Voivodeship, in northeastern Poland.
