= Pokaniewo =

- Village
- Location within Poland
- Coordinates: 52°32′N 23°4′E
- Country: Poland
- Voivodeship: Podlaskie
- County: Siemiatycze
- Gmina: Milejczyce

Pokaniewo [pɔkaˈɲɛvɔ] is a village in the administrative district of Gmina Milejczyce, within Siemiatycze County, Podlaskie Voivodeship, in north-eastern Poland.
