= Nowosiółki, Siemiatycze County =

Nowosiółki
- Village
- Location within Poland
- Coordinates: 52°33′N 23°11′E
- Country: Poland
- Voivodeship: Podlaskie
- County: Siemiatycze
- Gmina: Milejczyce

Nowosiółki [nɔvɔˈɕuu̯kʲi] is a village in the administrative district of Gmina Milejczyce, within Siemiatycze County, Podlaskie Voivodeship, in north-eastern Poland.
