= Choroszczewo =

- Village
- Location within Poland
- Coordinates: 52°33′N 23°2′E
- Country: Poland
- Voivodeship: Podlaskie
- County: Siemiatycze
- Gmina: Milejczyce

Choroszczewo [xɔrɔʂˈt͡ʂɛvɔ] is a village in the administrative district of Gmina Milejczyce, within Siemiatycze County, Podlaskie Voivodeship, in north-eastern Poland.
