= Jałtuszczyki =

- Village
- Location within Poland
- Coordinates: 52°31′30″N 23°6′49″E
- Country: Poland
- Voivodeship: Podlaskie
- County: Siemiatycze
- Gmina: Milejczyce

Jałtuszczyki [jau̯tuʂˈt͡ʂɨki] is a village in the administrative district of Gmina Milejczyce, within Siemiatycze County, Podlaskie Voivodeship, in north-eastern Poland.
