= Sobiatyno =

- Village
- Location within Poland
- Coordinates: 52°34′N 23°7′E
- Country: Poland
- Voivodeship: Podlaskie
- County: Siemiatycze
- Gmina: Milejczyce

Sobiatyno [sɔbjaˈtɨnɔ] is a village in the administrative district of Gmina Milejczyce, within Siemiatycze County, Podlaskie Voivodeship, in north-eastern Poland.

According to the 1921 census, the village had a population of 367 inhabitants. Of these, 2 identified as Roman Catholic, 350 as Orthodox, and 15 as of the Mosaic faith. In terms of nationality, 358 individuals declared Polish nationality, while 9 identified as Jewish. The village comprised 72 residential buildings.
