= Klimkowicze =

- Village
- Location within Poland
- Coordinates: 52°33′N 23°5′E
- Country: Poland
- Voivodeship: Podlaskie
- County: Siemiatycze
- Gmina: Milejczyce

Klimkowicze [klʲimkɔˈvʲit͡ʂɛ] is a village in the administrative district of Gmina Milejczyce, within Siemiatycze County, Podlaskie Voivodeship, in north-eastern Poland.

According to the 1921 census, the village was inhabited by 47 people, among whom 41 Orthodox, and 6 Mosaic. At the same time, all inhabitants declared Polish nationalityn. There were 8 residential buildings in the village.
