= Władysław Grydziuszko =

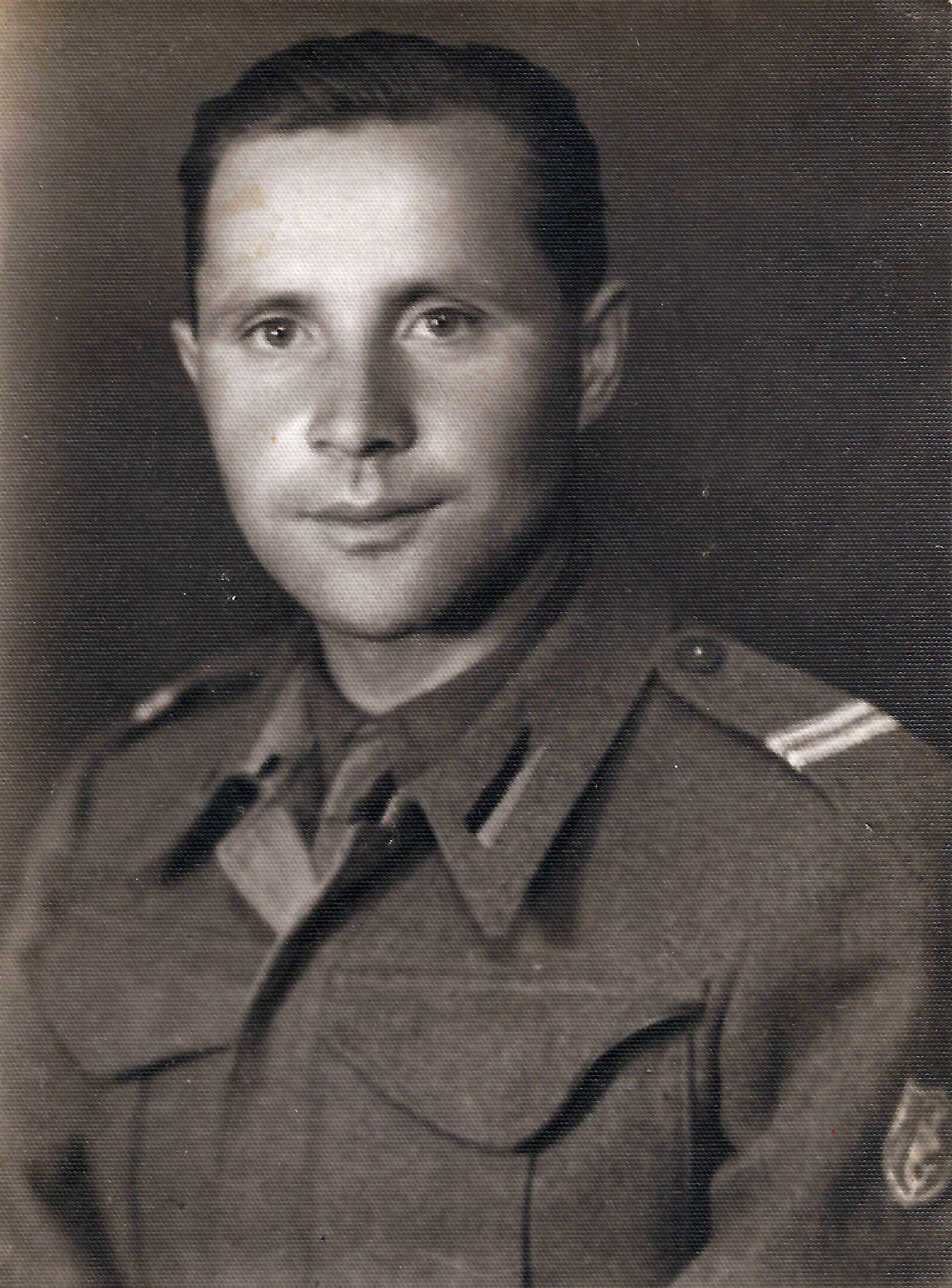
- Born: September 6, 1910; Mikulicze, Poland
- Died: January 29, 1946 (aged 35); Treia, Italy
- Military career
- Allegiance: (United Kingdom) Great Britain Poland
- Branch: Polish Army
- Service years: 1942-1946
- Rank: Sergeant
- Units: II Corps (Poland), 7th Field Artillery Regiment, Eighth Army (United Kingdom), 2nd Armoured Brigade (Poland)
- Conflicts: Polish–Soviet War, Invasion of Poland, World War II, Monte Cassino
- Awards: 1939-1945 Star Italy Star Defense Medal War Medal 1939–1945 Krzyż Walecznych Monte Cassino Commemorative Cross

Władysław Grydziuszko (1910–1946) was a soldier in the Polish Army during World War II. He served as a tank commander and was awarded the Cross of Valour for his actions during the Battle of Monte Cassino.

== Early life and military service ==
Władysław Grydziuszko was born on September 6, 1910, in the small rural village of Mikulicze, Poland. Prior to military service, Grydziuszko worked as a master tailor until he was enlisted with the Polish Forces in 1939. On August 28, 1939, he was called from reserve and together with the Polish Police unit participated in the 1939 Invasion of Poland campaign. Grydziuszko was taken prisoner of war by the former Soviet Red Army and was held in the USSR. Following his ordeal on the basis of the Sikorski–Mayski agreement of July 30, 1941, Grydziuszko was released for the purpose of joining the Polish Armed Forces in USSR. Grydziuszko was primarily posted to the Fifth Field Artillery Regiment, and was later transferred to the Seventh on January 1, 1942.

From 1942 to 1944, Grydziuszko received military training by the British Army in the Middle East. From 1944 to 1946, he participated in the Italian campaign.

== Battle at Monte Cassino ==
At Monte Cassino, the Polish Army was advancing against the Hitler Line, and on May 23 the Poles finally managed to break through attacking the village of Piedimonte. Grydziuszko, along with many other soldiers in the II Corps used stables and other local buildings to camouflage tanks and attack the advancing enemy from behind. In the following day the 5th Canadian (Armoured) Division breached the lines and on May, 25 the Poles cleared way for an advance onward to Rome. Władysław Grydziuszko, one of the tank commanders, was awarded the Cross of Valour for showing tremendous courage on the battlefield. During the battle, Grydziuszko was lightly wounded on October 17, 1944, and suffered minor spinal cord injuries from Nazi artillery fire. However, he quickly recovered and returned to the forces to serve for another two years.

== Other war efforts ==
Theater of Operations	Country		Dates
Invasion of Poland	Poland	(Poland)	September 1–20, 1939
Held prisoner of war	USSR	(Soviet Union)	Released July 30, 1941
Action in Middle East and Training	Palestine Egypt Iran Iraq	(Palestine) (Egypt) (Iran) (Iraq)	1942–1944
Action on the Rivers Sangro and Gari (river)	Italy	(Italy)	February 15 - April 4, 1944
Battle of Monte Cassino	Italy	(Italy)	April 24 - May 31, 1944
Battle for Ancona	Italy	(Italy)	June 1 - September 9, 1944
Action in the Northern Apennines	Italy	(Italy)	October 10 - December 20, 1944 – 1945
Action on River Senio	Italy	(Italy)	January 13 - April 8, 1945
Battle for Bologna	Italy	(Italy)	April 9 - May 2, 1945

== Death and aftermath ==
Following the end of World War II, Władysław Grydziuszko was killed in an accident near Treia, Macerata, in Italy on January 29, 1946. During a routine 2nd Armoured Brigade (Poland) training period, Władysław was killed when he fell underneath one of his tanks breaking his spine at the neck. The military considered his death "Killed in Action" (KIA) because he was on duty. His death was instantaneous, and soon afterward there was a memorial service held in his honor. Some 400 soldiers attended his funeral, and he was buried in the Polish cemetery in Loreto, Italy on January 30, 1946. The two witnesses of his death were Sgt Zygmunt Bartłomiej Ostrowski, born 24 August 1907, service number 3006762, of the same regimentand Michał Matusiewicz.

== Gallery ==
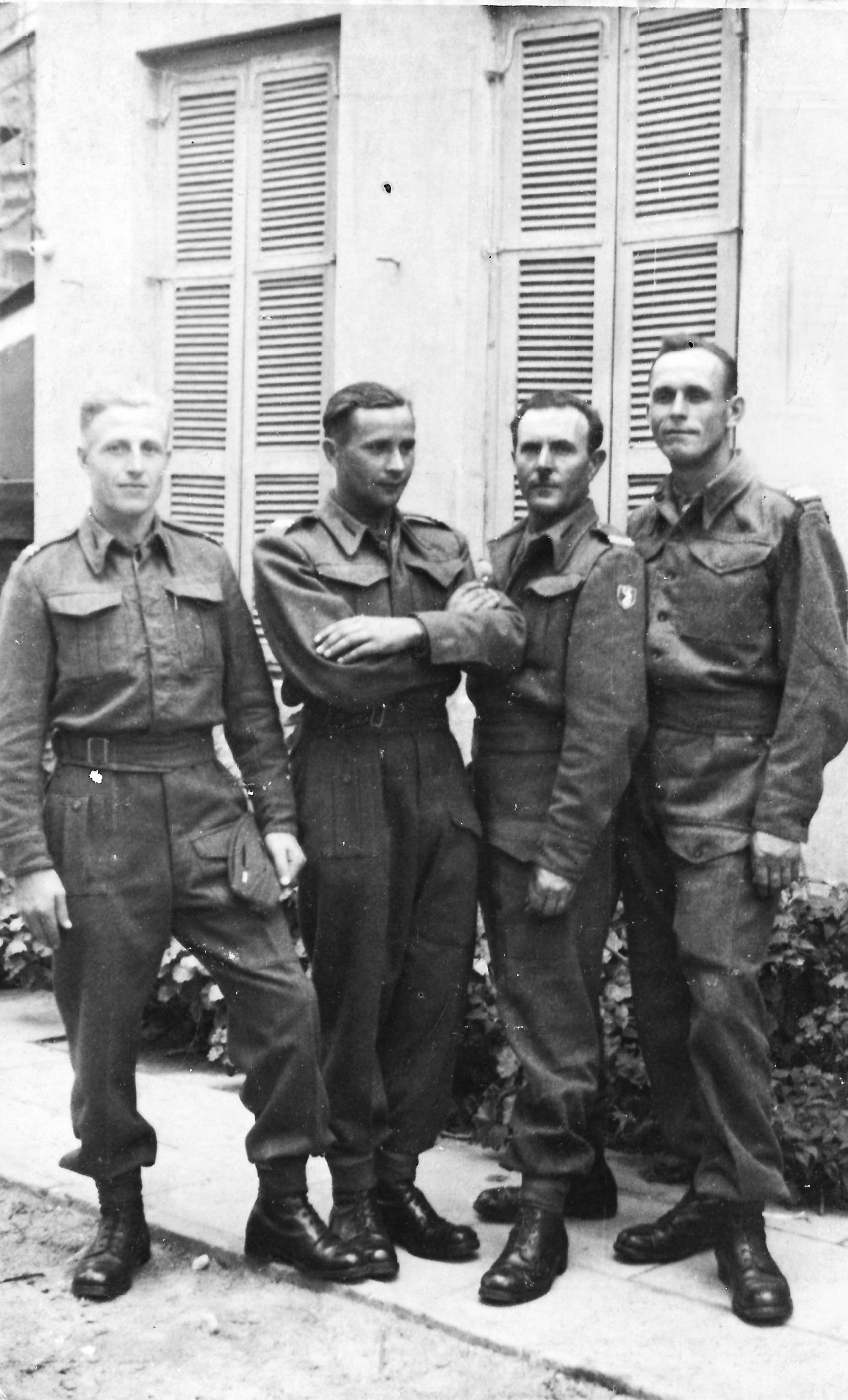
Grydziuszko's tank crew. Pictured second from left, ca. 1942

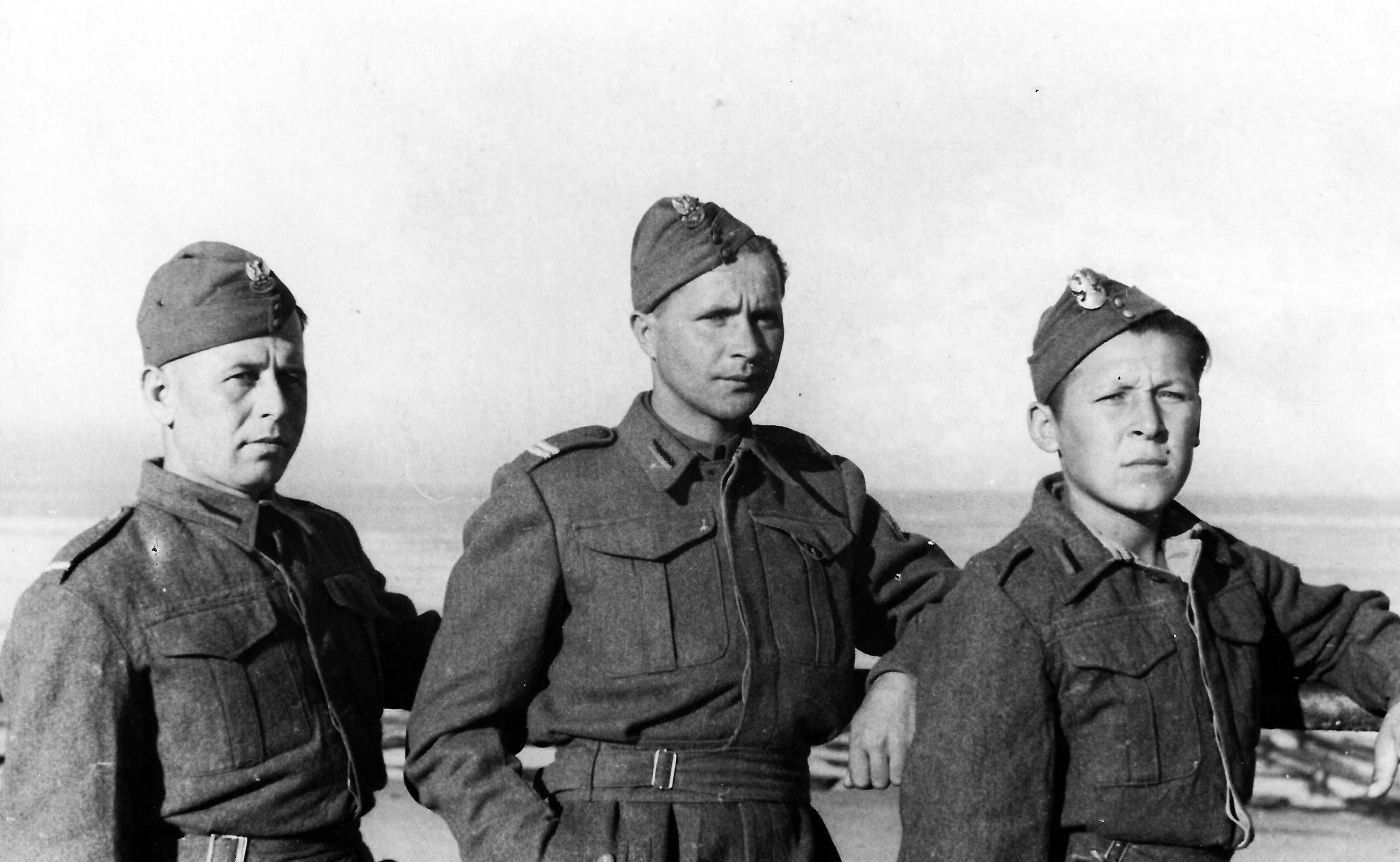
Władysław Grydziuszko as a tank commander (pictured middle), ca. 1942

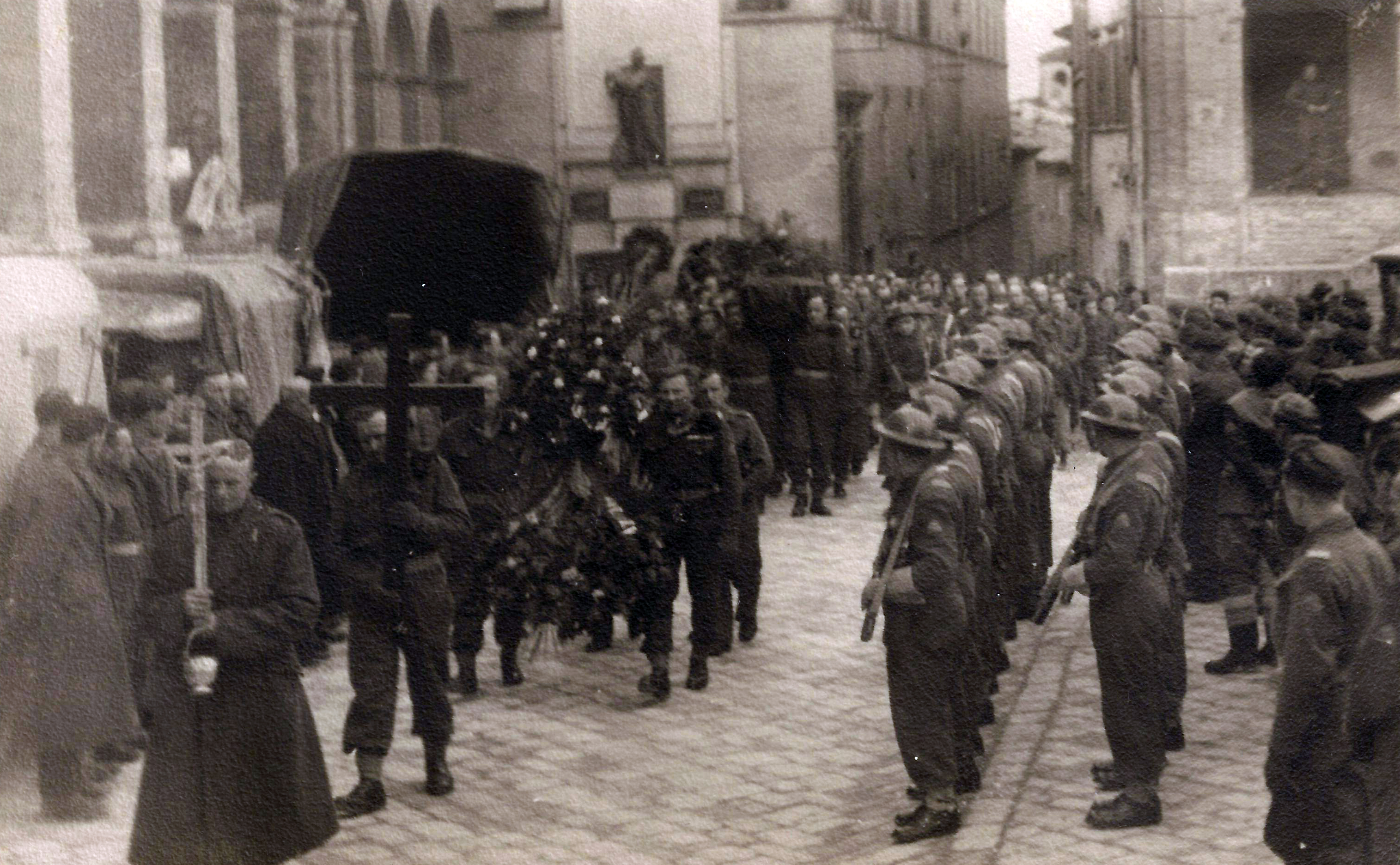
Władysław Grydziuszko's funeral service at the Piazza of Repubblica, Treia, ca. 1946

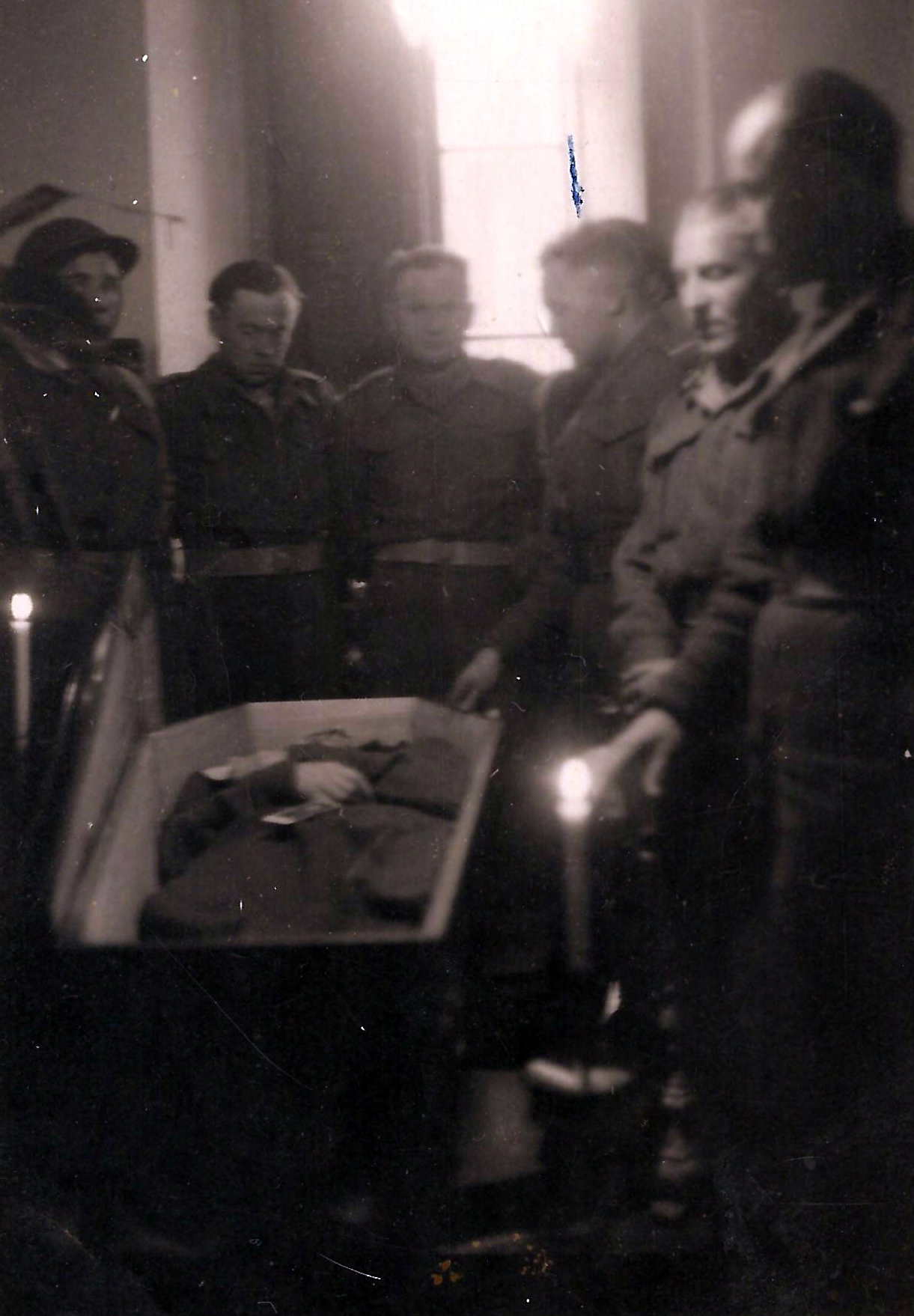
Grydziuszko after the memorial service with pl:Zygmunt Ostrowski, ca. 1946
