= Lubiejki =

- Village
- Location within Poland
- Coordinates: 52°34′N 23°2′E
- Country: Poland
- Voivodeship: Podlaskie
- County: Siemiatycze
- Gmina: Milejczyce
- Postal code: 17-332
- Vehicle registration: BSI

Lubiejki [luˈbjɛi̯ki] is a village in the administrative district of Gmina Milejczyce, within Siemiatycze County, Podlaskie Voivodeship, in eastern Poland.

Four Polish citizens were murdered by Nazi Germany in the village during World War II.
