= Evangelical Alliance in the Republic of Poland =

Polish evangelical Christian organisation

- Founded: 1999
- Type: Evangelical organization
- Purpose: Evangelical Christianity
- Headquarters: Warsaw, Poland
- Location: Poland
- Affiliations: World Evangelical Alliance
- Website: aliansewangeliczny.pl

Evangelical Alliance in the Republic of Poland (Polish: Alians Ewangeliczny w Rzeczypospolitej Polskiej, AE) is a national evangelical alliance in Poland, member of the World Evangelical Alliance.

== History ==
The history of evangelical churches in Poland dates back to the mid-19th century, when the first Baptists appeared to Poland. It was not until the late 1980s that political changes in the country allowed communities to function independently and gave freedom to formally register churches and create new communities. On 21 June 1999, the founding meeting of the Evangelical Alliance in the Republic of Poland was held, which resulted in the signing of the founding declaration by 17 churches and evangelical organisations. Polish Evangelical Alliance joined European Evangelical Alliance in 2000.

== Member denominations ==
Members of the Evangelical Alliance in the Republic of Poland:

=== Full members ===
- Baptist Christian Church of the Republic of Poland
- Church of Christ in the Republic of Poland
- Church of God in Poland
- Church of God in Christ of Poland
- Evangelical Faith Christian Church in the Republic of Poland
- Pentecostal Church in Poland

=== Associate members ===
- Church of Jesus Christ ‘Zion’ in Rzeszów
- Christian Centre ‘The Lord is the Banner’
- Christian Life and Mission Foundation
- Christian Radio Foundation
- Evangelical College of Theology in Wrocław
- Mt28 Christian Movement
- Peres Community Initiatives Association
- ZOE Christian Church
