= Osinki, Siemiatycze County =

Osinki
- Settlement
- Location within Poland
- Coordinates: 52°33′16″N 23°08′08″E
- Country: Poland
- Voivodeship: Podlaskie
- County: Siemiatycze
- Gmina: Milejczyce

Osinki [ɔˈɕiŋki] is a settlement in the administrative district of Gmina Milejczyce, within Siemiatycze County, Podlaskie Voivodeship, in north-eastern Poland.
