= Osinki, Russia =

Osinki (Russian: Осинки) is the name of several inhabited localities in Russia.

Urban localities

- Osinki, Samara Oblast, an urban-type settlement in Bezenchuksky District of Samara Oblast

Rural localities

- Osinki, Ivanovo Oblast, a village in Pestyakovsky District of Ivanovo Oblast
- Osinki, Kirov Oblast, a village in Kotelnichsky District of Kirov Oblast
- Osinki, name of several other rural localities
