= Chańki =

- Village
- Location within Poland
- Coordinates: 52°33′54″N 23°4′35″E
- Country: Poland
- Voivodeship: Podlaskie
- County: Siemiatycze
- Gmina: Milejczyce
- Population: 30

Chańki [ˈxaɲki] is a village in the administrative district of Gmina Milejczyce, within Siemiatycze County, Podlaskie Voivodeship, in north-eastern Poland.
