= Milejczyce =

- Village
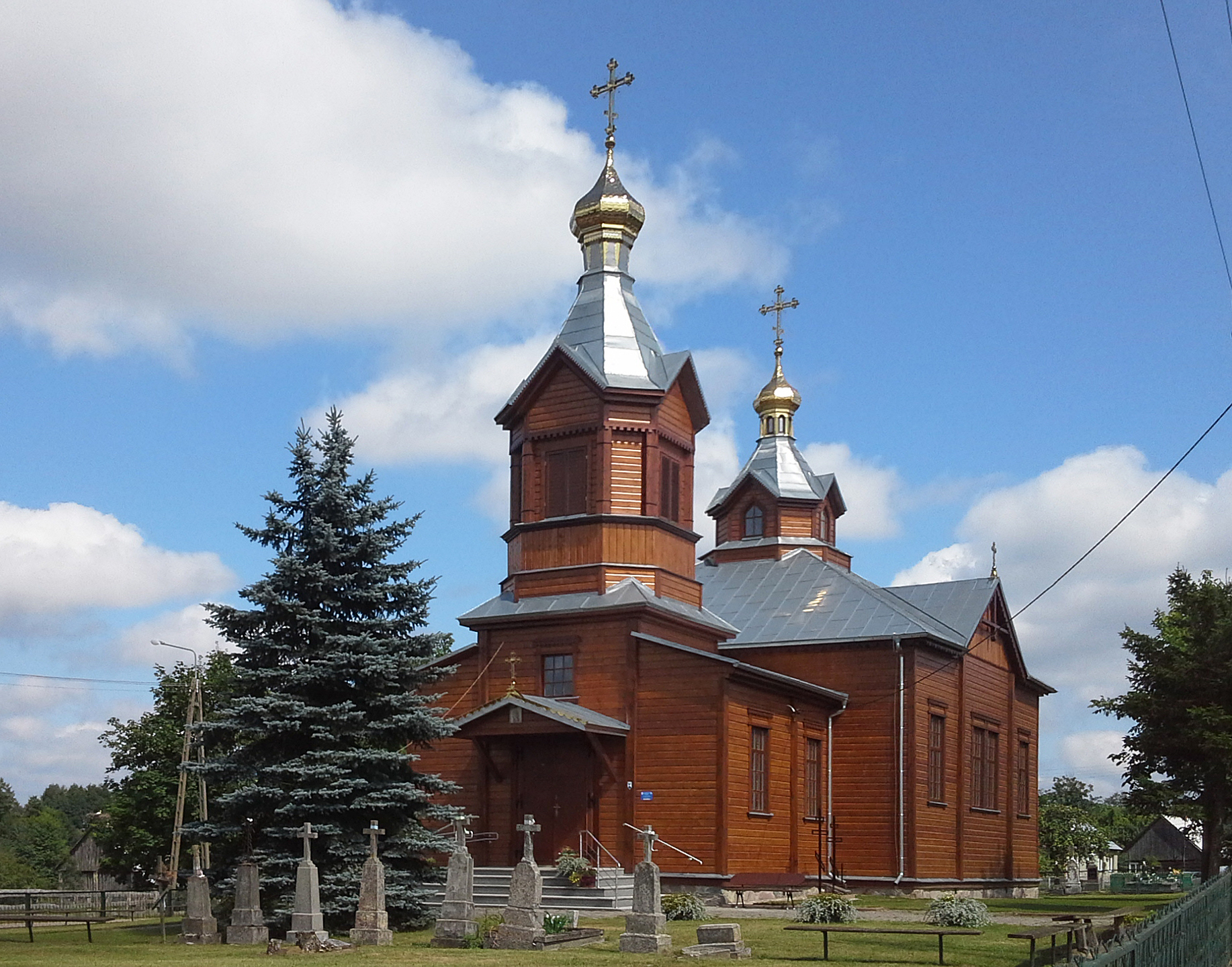
- St. Barbara's Church in Milejczyce

- Location within Poland
- Coordinates: 52°31′N 23°8′E
- Country: Poland
- Voivodeship: Podlaskie
- County: Siemiatycze
- Gmina: Milejczyce
- Population: 1,100

Milejczyce [mʲilɛi̯ˈt͡ʂɨt͡sɛ] is a village in Siemiatycze County, Podlaskie Voivodeship, in north-eastern Poland. It is the seat of the gmina (administrative district) called Gmina Milejczyce.

According to the 1921 census, the village was inhabited by 1,180 people, among whom 32 were Roman Catholic, 500 Orthodox, and 648 Mosaic. At the same time, 499 inhabitants declared Polish nationality, 241 Belarusian and 440 Jewish. There were 224 residential buildings in the village. The Germans invaded Milejczyce in 1941 after the Soviet occupation that began in September 1939. The Jewish population at the time of the German occupation was more than 1200. In November 1942, most were taken to a transit camp and then sent to Treblinka, where they were murdered upon arrival. A few had hidden from the transport, but the number of Jewish survivors from the town are thought to have been very few.
