= Places of worship in Warsaw =

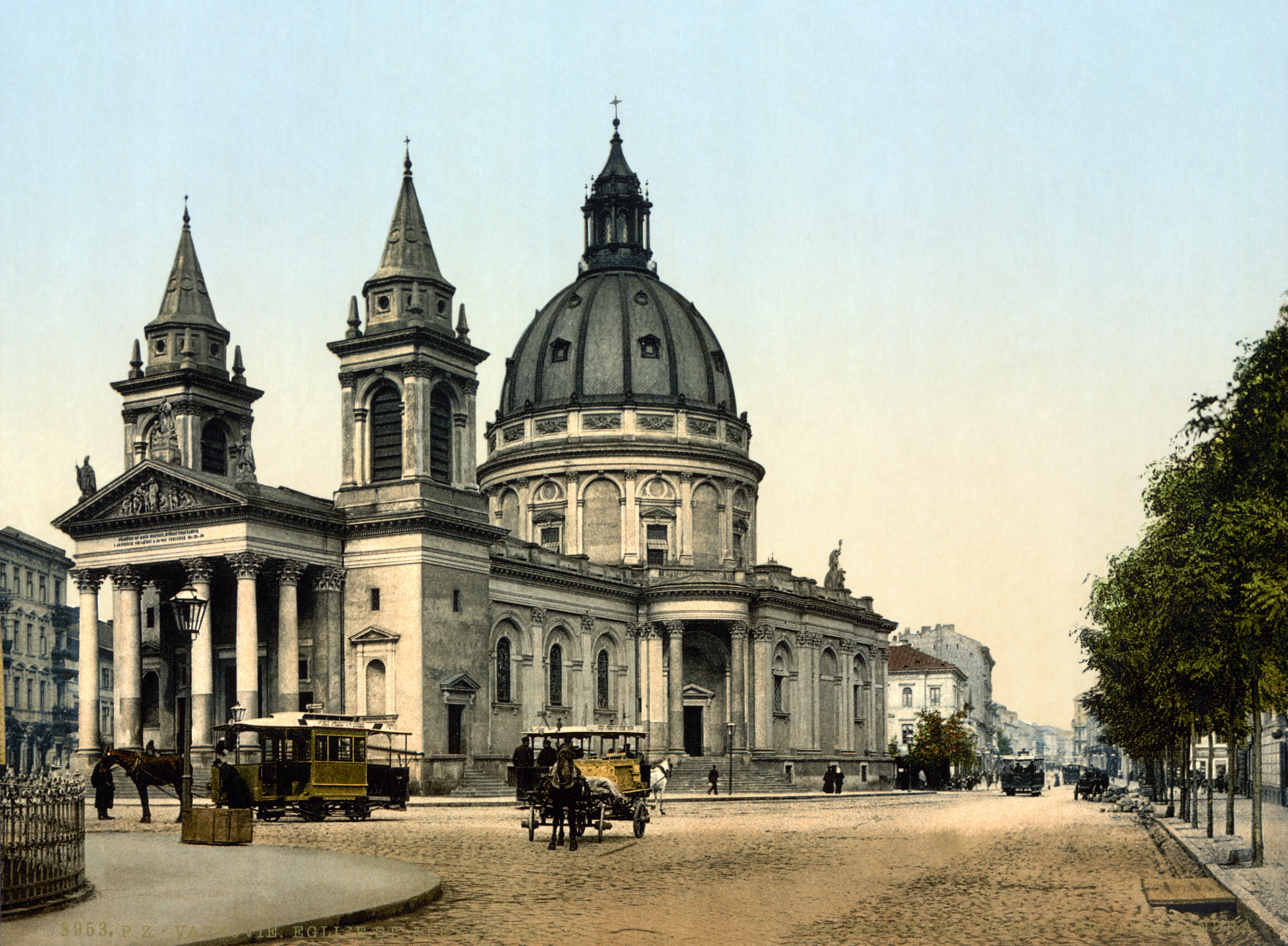
St. Alexander's Church prior to destruction in World War II, c. 1890–1900.

This article is a list of places of worship in Warsaw, Poland, both current and historical. It includes Catholic, Uniate, Protestant and Orthodox churches, as well as synagogues and shrines of other denominations. Note that the list includes also places of worship that were destroyed some time in the past and are currently non-existent. Throughout its existence, Warsaw has been a multi-cultural city. According to a census of 1901, out of 711,988 inhabitants there were 56.2% Catholics, 35.7% Jews, 5% Greek orthodox Christians and 2.8% Protestants. Eight years later, in 1909, there were 281,754 Jews (36.9%), 18,189 Protestants (2.4%) and 2,818 Mariavites (0.4%). This led to construction of hundreds of places of religious worship in all parts of the town. Most of them were destroyed in the aftermath of the Warsaw Uprising of 1944. After the war the new communist authorities of Poland discouraged church construction and only a small number of them were rebuilt.

The cathedrals and other main places of worship are bolded, non-existent churches are listed in italics.

== Christian ==
=== Roman Catholic ===
- St. Alexander's Church on Plac Trzech Krzyży
- All Saints Church
- St. Anne Church at Krakowskie Przedmieście, serving the academic community
- St. Anne Collegiate Church in Wilanów
- Church of St. Anthony of Padua in Czerniaków
- Church of St. Anthony of Padua in downtown Warsaw
- Church of the Ascension of the Lord
- St. Augustine's Church
- St. Barbara Chappel
- Camaldolese Church
- Capuchins Church at Miodowa Street
- Carmelite Church
- St. Casimir's Church
- St. Catherine's Church
- Shrine of St. Faustina
- Church of St. Felix of Cantalice
- **Field Cathedral of the Polish Army**
- **St. Florian's Cathedral** in the eastern borough of Praga
- St. Francis' Church
- Church of the Holiest Saviour at the square of the same name
- Holy Cross Church on Krakowskie Przedmieście
- Church of the Holy Spirit
- St. Hyacinth's Church
- Church of the Immaculate Conception of the Blessed Virgin Mary
- Jesuit Church in Old Town.
- **St. John's Cathedral**
- Church of John of God
- Blessed Ladislas of Gielniów Church
- Church of Our Lady of Loreto
- St. Lawrence's Church
- St. Martin's Church
- National Temple of Divine Providence (under construction)
- Church of the Nativity of the Blessed Virgin Mary
- Sts. Apostles Peter and Paul Church in Ursynów
- Sts. Apostles Peter and Paul Church in Downtown
- St. Stanislaus Kostka Church
- Church of the Visitation of the Blessed Virgin Mary
- Visitationist Church and convent

=== Eastern Orthodox ===
- **Alexander Nevsky Cathedral** at the Saxon Square (demolished between 1924 and 1926)
- Chapel of the Holy Mary Mother of God at Paryska street
- Church of the Holy Trinity in Podwale.
- St. John Climacus's Orthodox Church at the Orthodox Cemetery in Wola
- **St. Mary Magdalene's Cathedral** in Praga
- Church of the Archangel Michael in Warsaw (demolished in 1923)
- St. Peter and Paul's Church in Wołomin
- St. Olga's Church (demolished before 1935)

=== Protestant ===
==== Evangelical Church of the Augsburg Confession ====
- Holy Trinity Church (so-called Zug's Church)
- Church of the Ascension (Kościół Wniebowstąpienia Pańskiego w Warszawie)
- Church of the Epiphany (Kościół Objawienia Pańskiego w Warszawie)

==== Baptist Christian Church ====
- First Congregation of the Baptist Church
- Second Congregation of the Baptist Church
- Congregation of the Baptist Church in Radość
- Ukrainian Congregation of the Baptist Church (Ukrainian-speaking)
- Salvation Congregation of the Baptist Church (Russian-speaking)

==== Other Protestant denominations ====
- Anglican Church of Warsaw in Krakowskie Przedmieście
- Calvinist Parochial Church
- Evangelical Reformed Parish
- International Christian Fellowship, Warsaw
- Methodist Chapel at Plac Zbawiciela
- Pentecostal Church (Zbór Stołeczny)
- Seventh Day Adventist Church
- Warsaw International Church
- Warsaw Home Worship Group

=== Eastern Catholic ===
- Church of the Ascension of the Holy Mary of the Basilian monks at Miodowa street

=== Independent Catholic ===
==== Polish-Catholic Church ====
- **Holy Spirit Cathedral**
- Divine Mercy Chapel (Parafia polskokatolicka Miłosierdzia Bożego w Warszawie)

==== Old Catholic Mariavite Church ====
- Church of Our Lady of Perpetual Help (Kościół Matki Boskiej Nieustającej Pomocy w Warszawie)

==== Polish National Catholic Church in Poland ====
- Church of the Good Shepherd (Parafia Dobrego Pasterza w Warszawie)

== Jewish ==
- **Great Synagogue** (demolished in 1943)
- Nożyk Family Synagogue, the only synagogue to be rebuilt after the war
- Beit Warszawa Synagogue
- Chabad Lubavitch Synagogue
- Jewish house of prayer in Praga (abandoned after 1939)

== Muslim ==
- Islamic Cultural Centre in Ochota
- Wilanów Mosque

== Hindu ==
- Hindu Bhawan Temple
- Red Sues Temple in Sulejowek

== See also ==
- Tourist attractions in Warsaw
- Eastern Catholic Churches
