= Baptist Christian Church Congregation in Szczecin =

Roman Catholic church in Warsaw, Poland

Coordinates: 53°25′25.1″N 14°32′55.2″E

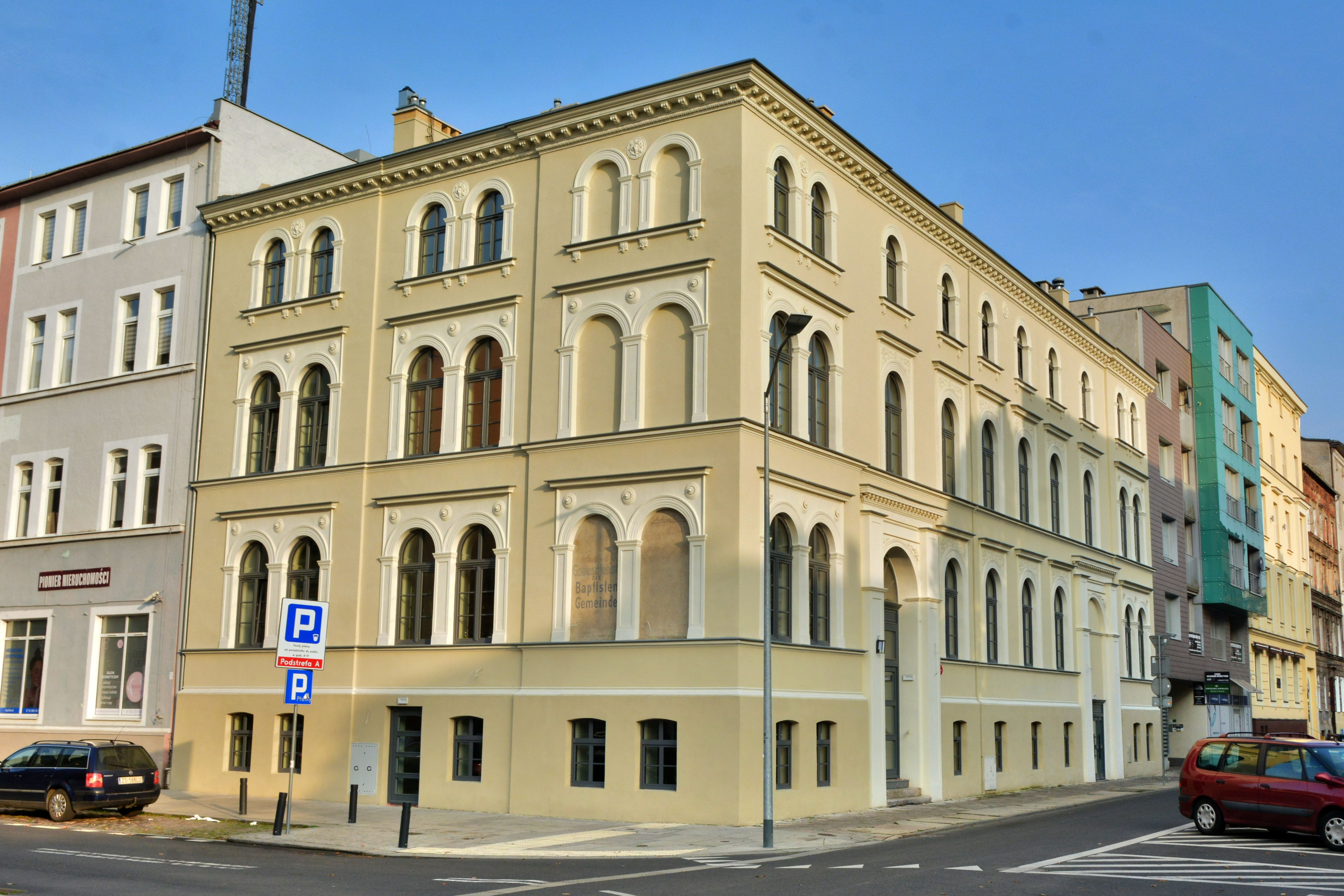
- The building of the Baptist congregation in Szczecin.

- Location in Poland
- Location: 4 Stoisława Street, Szczecin, Poland
- Denomination: Baptist Christian Church of the Republic of Poland

History
- Status: Active
- Consecrated: 1855

Architecture
- Functional status: Chapel
- Architect: A. Mews
- Completed: 1855

The Baptist Christian Church Congregation in Szczecin (Polish: Zbór Kościoła Chrześcijan Baptystów w Szczecinie; German: Baptistenkirche in Stettin) is a congregation of the Baptist Christian Church of the Republic of Poland in the city of Szczecin, Poland. Its chapel is housed in a tenement at 4 Stoisława Street within the neighbourhood of New Town. The building dates to 1855, and is the oldest Baptist structure in Poland.

== History ==
A Baptist congregation was founded in Szczecin in 1846. A tenement, which houses its chapel, was constructed at the current 4 Stoisława Stree in 1855. It was designed by A. Mews. Currently, it is the oldest Baptist building in Poland. After the end of the Second World War, the building became a property of the government of Poland, with Baptists having to pay rent for its usage. During this period, held services two days in a week. At the beginning of the 21st century, the ownership over the building was granted to the Baptist Christian Church of the Republic of Poland.

The building was renovated between 2019 and 2024. In 2024, a coffeehouse was opened in the building, operated by the Baptist organisation, with profits being donated to charities. Its tables were made from the wood sourced from floor and other elements removed from the chapel during the renovations works. The wood dated at over 170 years. In 2024, the building was also distinguished in the Well-maintained Landmark (Polish: Zadbany Zabytek), an annual architecture contest held by the National Institute of Cultural Heritage.
