= Statue of Stefan Wyszyński =

Monument in Warsaw, Poland

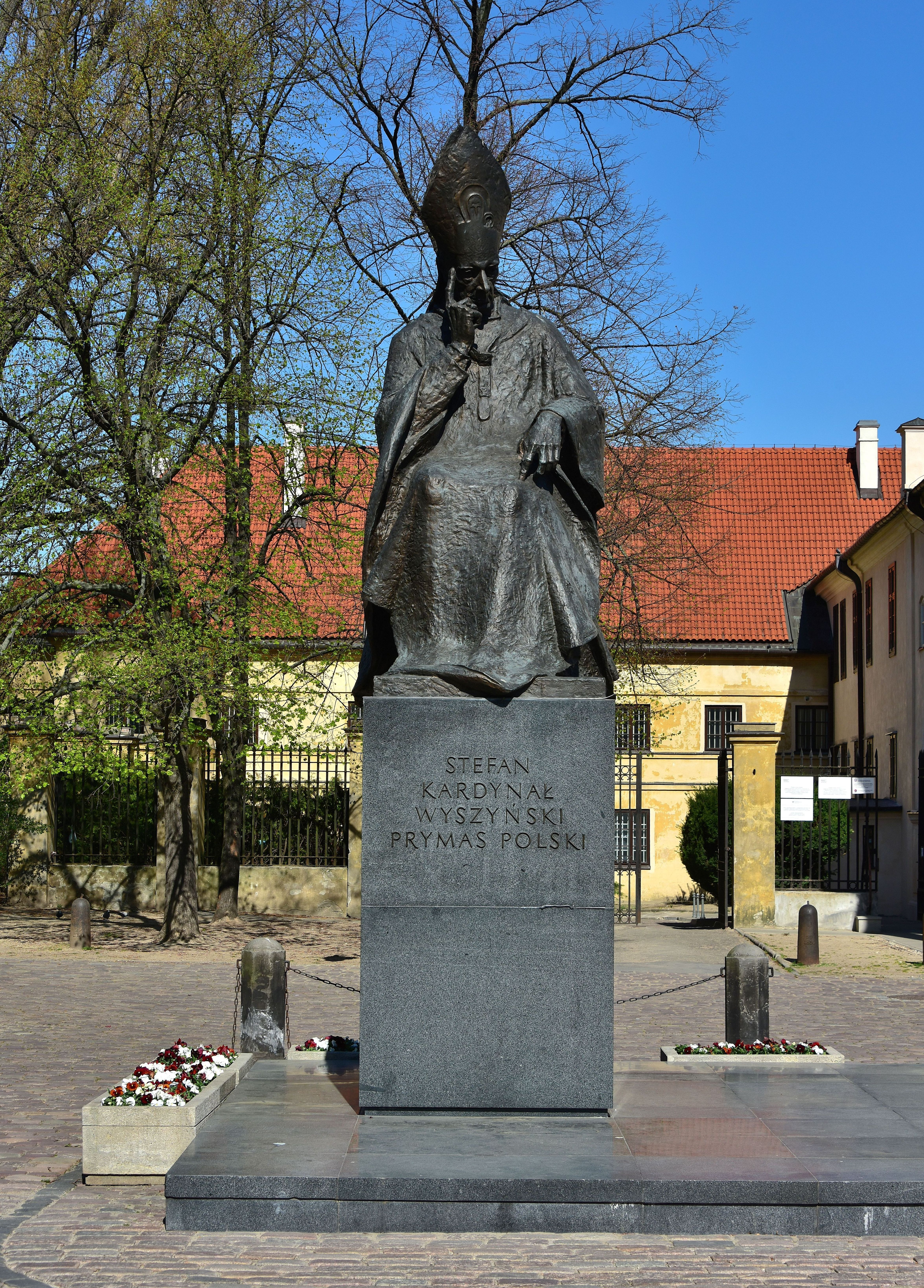
- The monument in 2019.
- Interactive map of Statue of Stefan Wyszyński
- Location: 34 Kraków Suburb Street, Downtown, Warsaw, Poland
- Coordinates: 52°14′28.02″N 21°00′59.78″E
- Designer: Andrzej Renes
- Type: Statue
- Material: Bronze
- Opening date: 27 May 1987
- Dedicated to: Stefan Wyszyński

The statue of Stefan Wyszyński (Polish: Pomnik Stefana Wyszyńskiego) is a bronze statue in Warsaw, Poland, within the North Downtown neighbourhood. It is placed in front of the Visitationist Church at 34 Kraków Suburb Street. It depicts Stefan Wyszyński, a Catholic prelate who served as Archbishop of Warsaw and Gniezno from 1948 to 1981. The sculpture was designed by Andrzej Renes, and unveiled on 27 May 1987.

== History ==
During the period of the martial law in Poland between 1981 and 1983, the small square in front of the Visitationist Church, became a gathering spot of Warsaw residents. There would place flowers and grave candles in a shape of a cross, in the protest against the state, and as a symbol of their affiliation of the Church, which was in the opposition to the government. The display was systematicly destroyed by officers of the Citizens' Militia and Security Office.

On 27 May 1987, at this location was unveiled a statue dedicated to Stefan Wyszyński, a Catholic prelate who served as Archbishop of Warsaw and Gniezno from 1948 to 1981. The sculpture was designed by Andrzej Renes.

== Design ==
The sculpture includes a bronze statue of Stefan Wyszyński, depicting him in a thinking post, wearing vestment garments, and sitting on a archbishop'a throne. It is placed on a granite pedestal, on top of a large slab, intended for people to lie flowers and grave candles on top of. The pedestal breads a Polish inscription which reads "Stefan Kardynał Wyszyński; Prymas Polski", and translates to "Cardinal Stefan Wyszyński; Primate of Poland".
