= Field Cathedral of the Polish Army =

Church of Our Lady Queen of the Polish Crown Katedra Polowa Wojska Polskiego (in Polish)
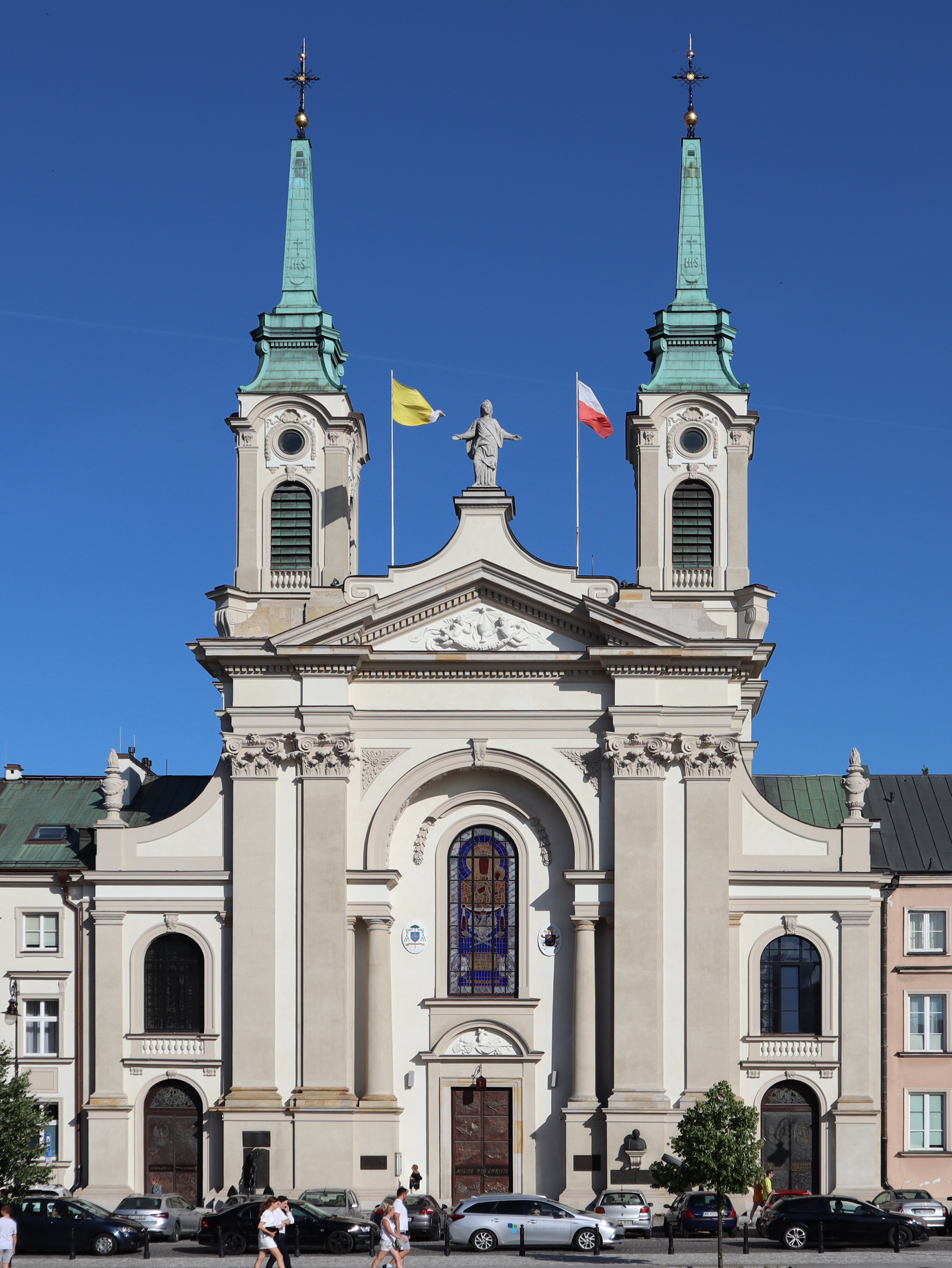
- The Field Cathedral, reconstructed after World War II
- Church of Our Lady Queen of the Polish Crown; Katedra Polowa Wojska Polskiego (in Polish)
- 52°14′56″N 21°0′24″E
- Location: Warsaw
- Country: Poland
- Denomination: Roman Catholic
- Previous denomination: Roman Catholic (1660-1834); Eastern Orthodox (1834-1915)

History
- Founded: 1660

Architecture
- Architect: Constantino Tencalla
- Architectural type: Church
- Style: Baroque
- Years built: 1660-1701
- Demolished: 1944

The Field Cathedral of the Polish Army (Polish: Katedra Polowa Wojska Polskiego, also known as the Church of Our Lady Queen of the Polish Crown) is the main garrison church of Warsaw and the representative cathedral of the entire Polish Army. In the past the church served a variety of communities and roles: it used to be the church of the Collegium Nobilium and in the 19th century was also turned into a Russian Orthodox church. Currently all major military religious feasts in Warsaw are held there.

It is located on Długa Street 13/15, opposite the Heroes of the Warsaw Uprising Monument and Krasiński Square, close to Warsaw's Old Town.

== History ==
In the 17th century the Piarist friars were given a royal privilege to obtain a large parcel to the west of Warsaw's Old Town. The area, located along the newly paved Miodowa Street, was close to the contemporary city centre, but at the same time offered much more space than in densely populated town. The monks founded the Collegium Nobilium, one of the most notable schools of the epoch and a predecessor to the Warsaw University. In 1660 they also started the construction of a new church that would serve both the students and their teachers, designed most probably by Constantino Tencalla, an Italian architect active in the Polish–Lithuanian Commonwealth at the time.

The church, financed largely by King John Casimir of Poland, was to occupy the place of a former wooden church of Saint Prym and Felicjan, destroyed by the Swedes during the Deluge. However, following the wars with Sweden, Muscovy and the Cossacks, Poland's economy was in ruins and the king's abdication marked an end of the ambitious construction. Because of that, the construction lasted until 1682. The internal works lasted two additional decades and it was not until 1701 that the church was finally consecrated by the bishop of Poznań Mikołaj Święcicki.

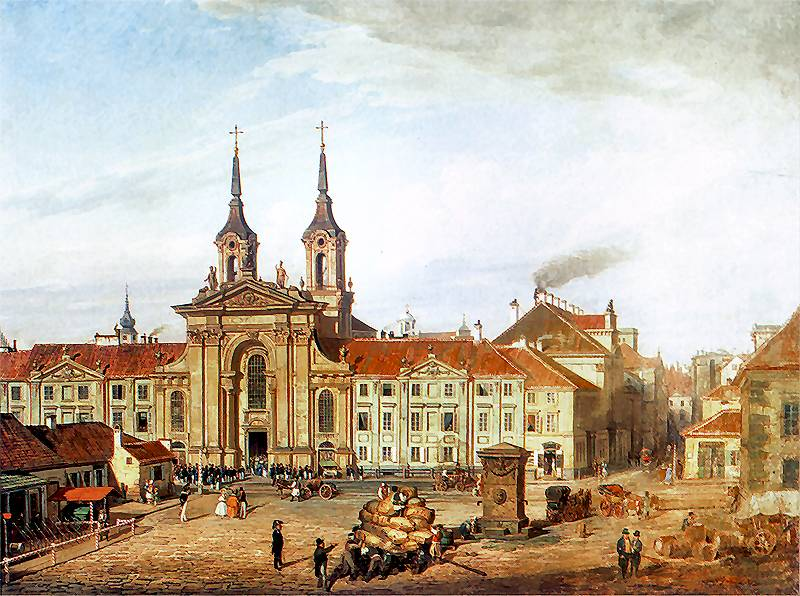
View of the church in 1830 by Marcin Zaleski.

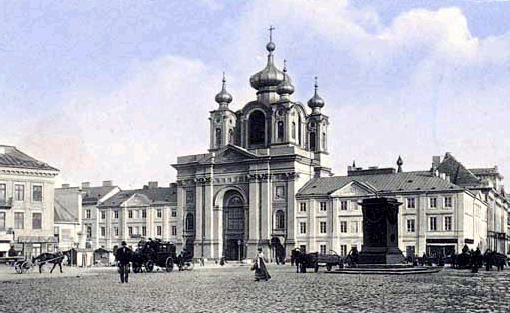
View of the church during the Russian years.

The church continued the traditions of the earlier church of Saint Prym and Felicjan, but also received a new patron saint, the Holy Mary of Victories. A painting of Holy Mary the Gracious was imported from Faenza and relics of two Catholic saints were brought from Rome, donated by Pope Urban VIII. Due to its long period of construction, the church's design became outdated almost instantly after its completion, as late baroque was being replaced with classicism in European architecture. In 1730 the church was reconstructed according to the plans of Józef Fontana.

Following the failed November Uprising against the Russian Empire, in 1834 the church was confiscated by the Russian authorities and turned into an Orthodox church of the Holy Trinity. Between 1835 and 1837 it was yet again reconstructed in a style reminiscent of Rastrelli's baroque churches. Its authors were Antonio Corazzi and Andrzej Gołuński. During the reconstruction much of the internal design was destroyed and replaced with Orthodox frescoes as well as with a large iconostasis. In addition, large, onion domes were added to both towers. Simultaneously, the surrounding buildings of the former Piarist monastery and Humański's Palace were also reconstructed to suit the Russian style.

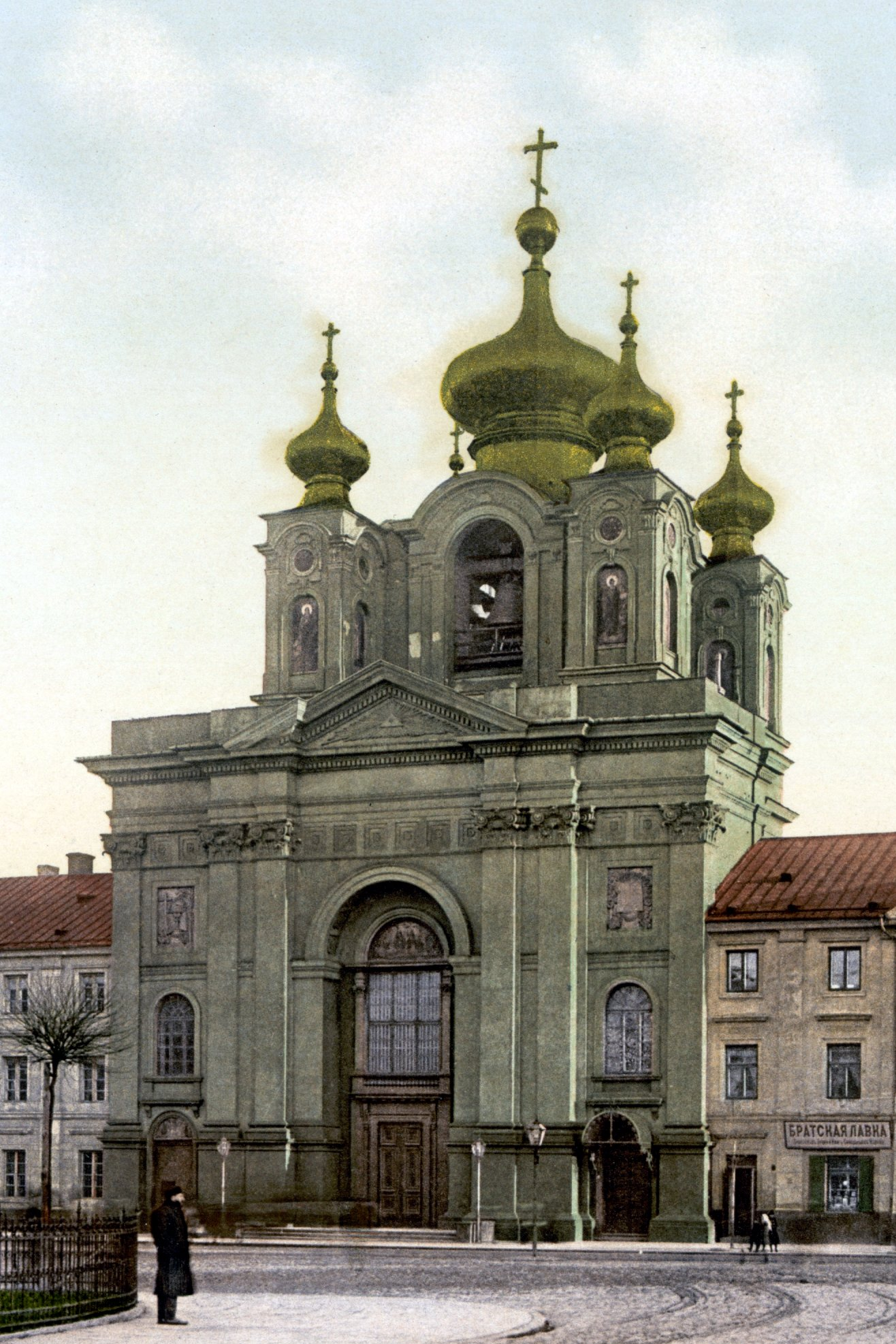
Religion was an element of Russification in the Russian Empire. The church was seized and converted into a Russian Orthodox Church while Warsaw was a part of the Russian Empire.

After the Russians left Warsaw in 1915, the church was used by the German army stationed in Warsaw as a depot. After Poland regained her independence in 1918, the decision was made to reconstruct the church back to its former look. Between 1923 and 1927 the church was yet again reconstructed, this time by Oskar Sosnowski, who based his design on 17th century drawings. After the refurbishment the shrine was yet again consecrated as a Catholic church, but it was not returned to the Piarists. Instead, it rose to the dignity of a cathedral, as it became the seat of the field bishop of the Polish Army.

During the Warsaw Uprising of 1944 the cathedral was one of the churches frequently targeted by the Luftwaffe. Heavy fights were also fought for the ruins, as the preserved western tower was used as an observation post. At the same time the cellars of the monastery and the crypts beneath the church were used as a provisional field hospital. The remnants of the church, along with the hospital, were destroyed by German aerial bombardment on August 20, 1944.

After the war, between 1946 and 1960 the church was restored to its former glory by a team of architects led by Leon Marek Suzin. The church remained the seat of the bishop of the army, though that post was almost purely titular as in Communist-led Poland religion had no place in the army. The official institution of the Field Bishop of the Polish Army (along with similar posts for other denominations) was restored after Poland regained sovereignty following the 1989 Autumn of Nations. The church consequently regained the status of a cathedral becoming the seat of the Military Ordinariate of Poland, one of three cathedrals in Warsaw currently.

== Notable features ==
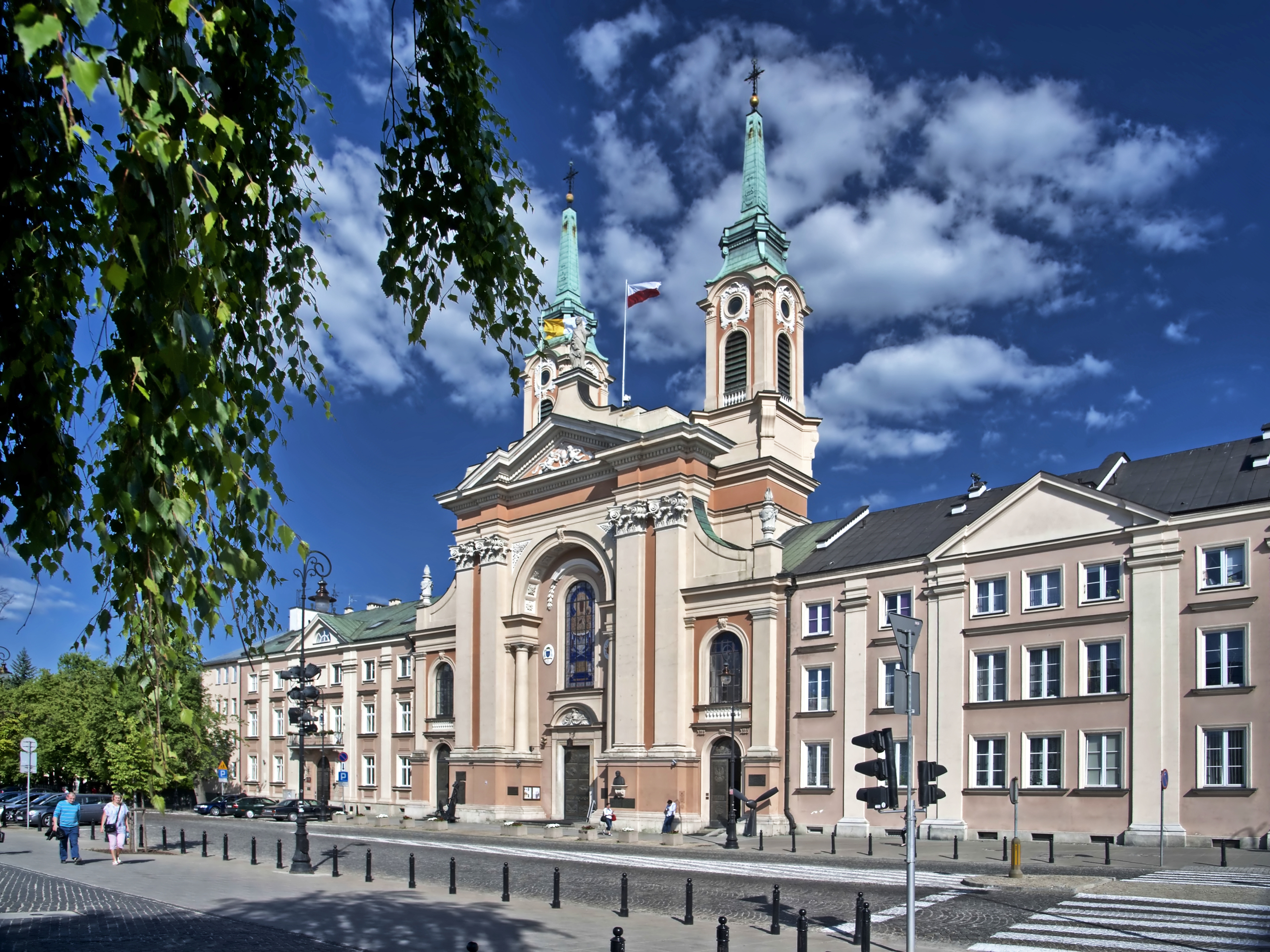
Field Cathedral of the Polish Army

The cathedral is currently the central church of the Polish Army and all major religious feasts related to the Polish armed forces are held there. The front façade is marked by a large tympanum pointed by a sculpture depicting the Holy Mary and sided by two low towers. On both sides of the main entrance there are a number of stone tablets commemorating notable Polish military units of the past, as well as an anchor and a propeller symbolizing two branches of the Polish armed forces. The church's lobby is marked by a number of symbolic paintings depicting some of the most prominent Polish battles and Uprisings. Additional battles are depicted on a bronze gate.

The main altar contains a sculpture of the patron saint of the church, Our Lady Queen of the Polish Crown. Beneath the sculpture there is a steel grating with hundreds of military decorations and votive plaques donated by the soldiers. To the left there is a small Chapel of the Polish Soldier - a Mausoleum of the Defenders of the Motherland. Among the battles featured on stone slabs there are the battle of Cedynia, battle of Grunwald, battle of Vienna, battle of Westerplatte, defence of Warsaw, Warsaw Uprising and the battle of Berlin, as well as other battles of World War II. A chapel to the right of the altar is devoted to the victims of the Katyn massacre. Approximately 15,000 small tablets mark the names of the Polish officers mass murdered by the NKVD in 1940, while additional 7000 wait for the names of those, whose bodies are yet to be found. Some of the pre-war paintings that were destroyed by the Germans in 1944 were replaced with paintings by Michael Willmann, brought to Warsaw from Silesia after the war.

== Burials ==
- Ludomił Rayski (ashes reinterred)

== See also ==
- Places of worship in Warsaw
- Visitationist Church
- St Martin's Church
- St. Florian's Cathedral

== Notes and references ==
In-line

General

- "Katedra Polowa Wojska Polskiego". Wieżowce Warszawy (The Scy-Scrapers of Warsaw) (in Polish). 2005. Archived from the original on 2012-02-04.
- Rev. Grzegorz Kalwarczyk (2004). "excerpt". Kościoły lewobrzeżnej Warszawy. Nasze dziedzictwo. Churches on the left-bank of Warsaw. Our heritage (in Polish). Bydgoszcz: Opoka. pp. 16–21. Archived from the original on 2007-03-23.
- Katedra polowa Wojska Polskiego w Warszawie (in Polish). Warsaw: Parol. 1995. p. 63. ISBN 83-85331-41-7.
- Ryszard Mączewski (2005). "Kościół pw Matki Bożej Królowej Polski". Architektura przedwojennej Warszawy (in Polish).
