= Sts. Apostles Peter and Paul Church (Downtown, Warsaw) =

Roman Catholic church in Warsaw, Poland

Coordinates: 52°13′35.40″N 21°00′25.92″E

- Kościół Świętych Apostołów Piotra i Pawła
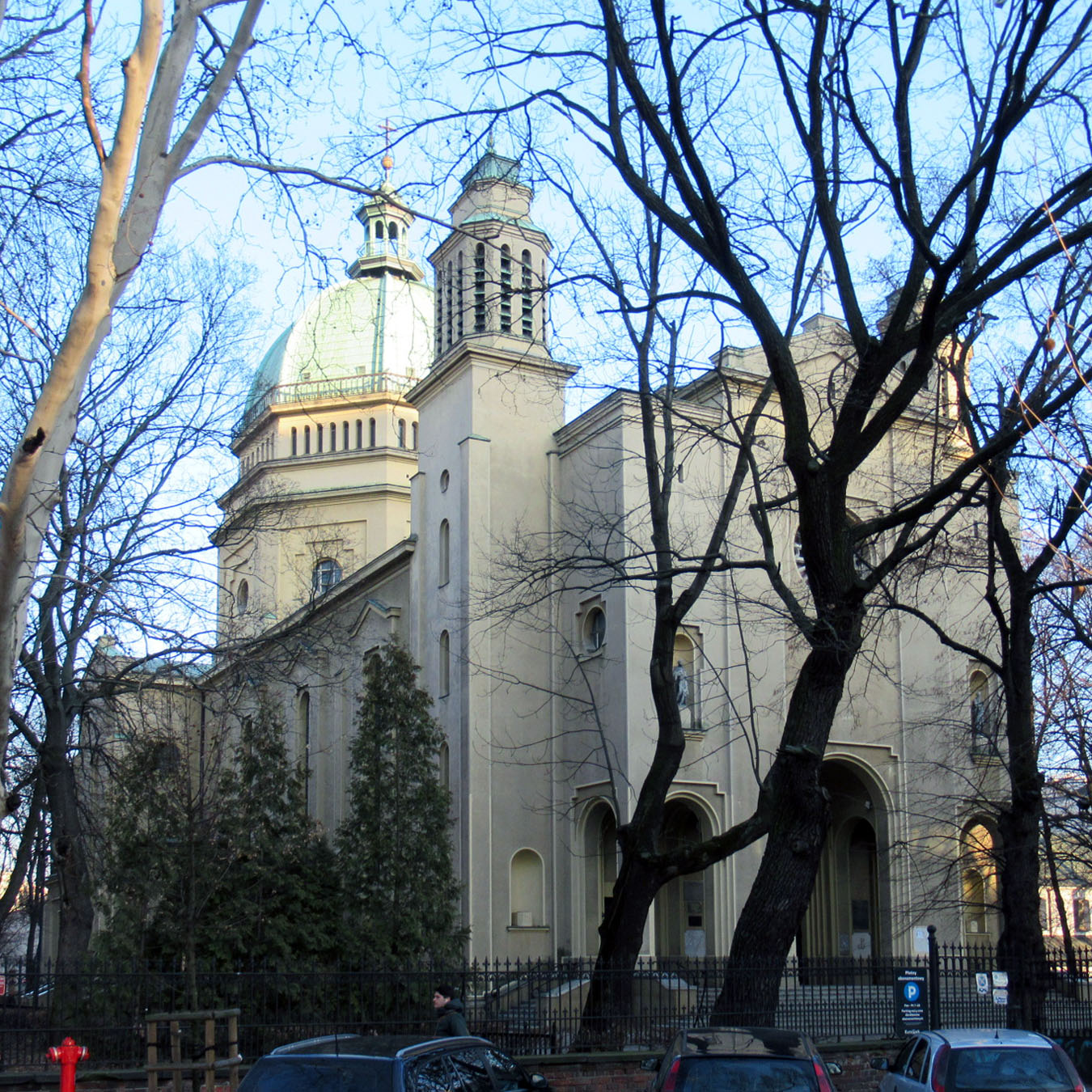
- The church in 2020.

- Location in Warsaw, Poland
- Location: 18 Plater Street, Downtown, Warsaw
- Country: Poland
- Denomination: Roman Catholic

History
- Status: Active
- Dedication: Saint Peter; Saint Paul
- Consecrated: 4 October 1979

Architecture
- Functional status: Parish church
- Style: Modernist
- Groundbreaking: 7 September 1946
- Completed: 17 November 1957

Administration
- Archdiocese: Warsaw
- Deanery: Downtown
- Parish: St. Barbara

The Sts. Apostles Peter and Paul Church (Polish: Kościół Świętych Apostołów Piotra i Pawła) is a modernist Roman Catholic parish church in Warsaw, Poland, located within the Downtown district. It is placed at 18 Plater Street, at the corner with Wspólna Street, within the neighbourhood of South Downtown. The original church, designed by Edward Cichocki in the Romanesque Revival style, was built between 1983 and 1886. It was destroyed in 1944. The current building, designed by Stanisław Marzyński, was built between 1946 and 1957, and consecrated in 1979. It is placed on the voivodeship heritage list. The church is dedicated to Saint Peter and Saint Paul, who, in the Christian theology, were the apostles who spread the teachings of Jesus Christ in the first-century AD. Saint Peter was also the first Pope, the leader of the Catholic Church.

== History ==
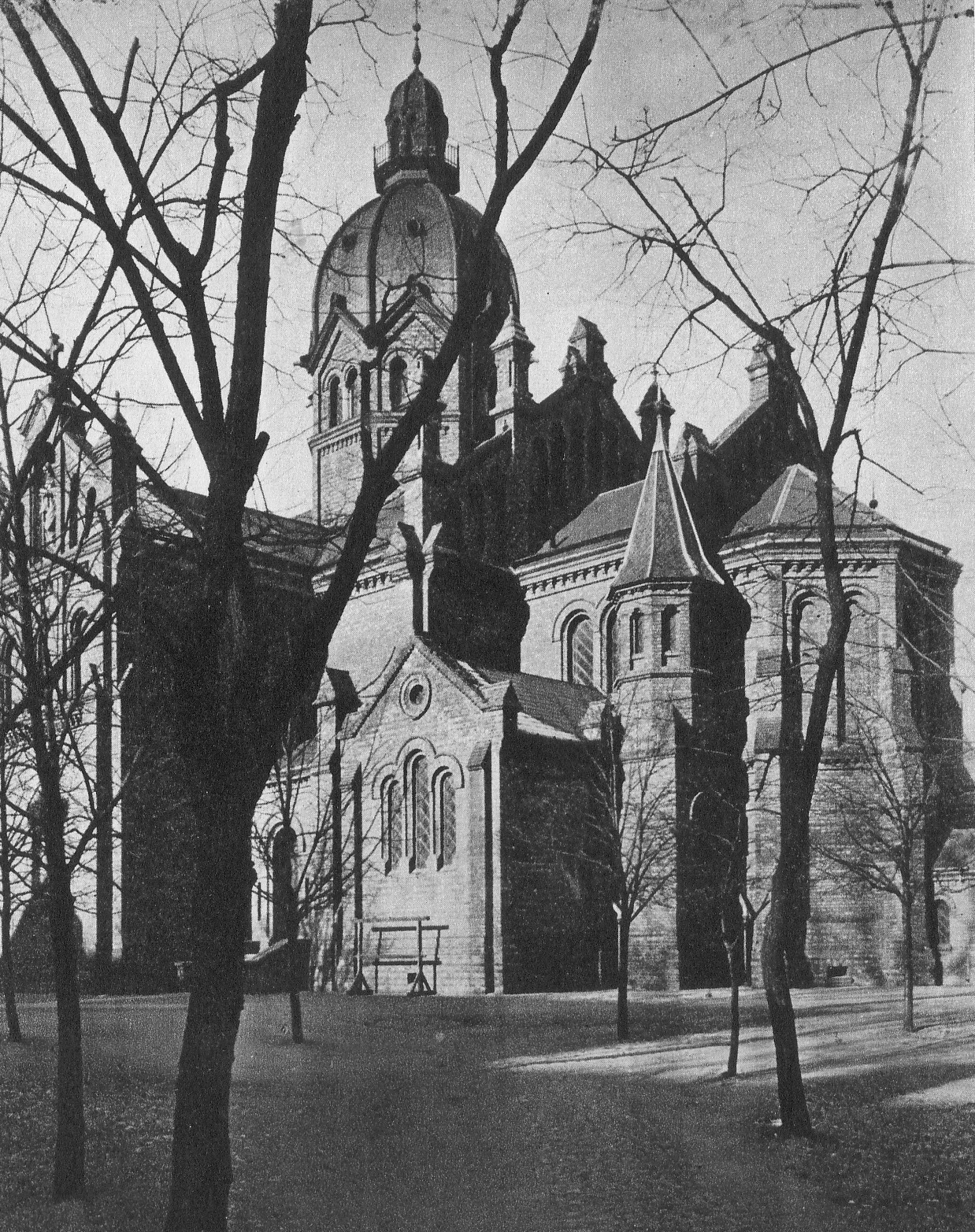
The original church building in the 1930s, prior to its destruction in 1944.

The church was built in the area of the former Holy Cross Cemetery. The necropolis was founded in 1783 and closed in 1836. It was demolished between 1860 and 1865, with graves being exhumed and moved to the Powązki Cemetery. In 1866, the St. Barbara Chappel, built at the cemetery in 1781, was elevated to the status of a parish church. As its capacity was limited to 200 people, it was expanded in 1881, with another chapel on its side. It increased the capacity to 400 people. As this proved insufficient, a new church building, named the Sts. Apostles Peter and Paul Church, begun being constructed nearby in March 1883. It was financed by philanthropist Tekla Rapacka. On 28 June 1983, a cornerstone was ceremonially laid at the fundaments by Wincenty Teofil Popiel, the metropolitan archbishop of Warsaw. The construction was finished in June 1886, and the building was consecrated by Popiel. The building was named after Saint Peter and Saint Paul, who, in the Christian theology, were the apostles who spread the teachings of Jesus Christ in the first-century AD. Saint Peter was also the first Pope, the leader of the Catholic Church. In 1883, a mausoleum of the Przeździecki family, was built behind the church, on the current Św. Barbary Street.

The building was designed by Edward Cichocki, who also oversaw its construction together with Józef Pius Dziekoński. The church was built from bricks without the use of a plasterwork, in a Romanesque Revival style. Its had a cruciform foundations, with a large dome above the transept. Its columns, pinnacles, slopes couting, and a portion of cornices, were made from ashlar masonry. In the inside, it features a large marble altar with sandstone decorations, created in 1900 by Gustaw Werner, and financed by countess Maria Przeździecka, rows of Romanesque Revival chapels with altars in the side aisles, and wall mosaics depicting Sts. Peter and Paul, and Pope Leo X, imported from Venice. It also included brick rib vaults, and brick pillars. In the late 1920s, the interior was decorated with polychrome elements, made using sgraffito technique and gold-plated decorative elements.

In September 1939, during the siege of Warsaw in the Second World War, a nearby ammunition depot exploded, leading to the collapse of the church's roof and portion of its rib vaults, as well as a damage of the mausoleum of the Przeździecki family. They were repaired in 1940. The church was heavily damaged in August 1944, when its surroundings became a site of heavy fighting during the Warsaw Uprising. A fence surrounding the church still features marks left by bullets. Following the fall of the uprising in October 1944, the German officers laid a series of mines across the building, destroying it with their detonation. It was done as part of the planned destruction of the city. The building was almost completely destroyed, with its foundations and basement surviving, together with some pieces of art which were stored underground or on its outside.

Soon after the end of the conflict in September 1945, the rubble was cleared out from the remaining foundations, and on 7 September 1946, Antoni Szlagowski, the auxiliary bishop of Warsaw, laid ceremonially a cornerstone for a new church building. It was designed by Stanisław Marzyński. The construction was finished on 17 November 1957. The St. Barbara Chapel was also restored, while the remains of the mausoleum of the Przeździecki family was removed. The church was consecrated on 4 October 1979 by cardinal Stefan Wyszyński, the primate of Poland.

Between 1998 and 2001, a pipe organ was installed inside of the church, by the company Kamińscy, considered one of the leading manufacturers in the country. They were unveiled and blessed by cardinal Józef Glemp, the primate of Poland, on 4 June 2001.

On 27 November 2020, the building was placed on the voivodeship heritage list.

== Characteristics ==
The church building has a modernist façade, with its structure built from bricks. It has cruciform foundations, with a large eight-sided dome above the transept. On the interior, it features a large marble altar with sandstone decorations, created in 1900 by Gustaw Werner, which was heavily damaged during the Second World War. The walls behind are decorated with a large ceramic mosaic, created in the 1990s by Lech Grześkiewicz and Piotr Grześkiewicz. It depicts the Holy Trinity, with angels, Saint Peter and Saint Paul, and a symbol of the Eucharist. In the side aisles, the church also has rows of Romanesque Revival chapels with altars. The interior is decorated with works of art which survived from the previous church building, which survived its destruction in 1944. This includes a statue of Francis of Assisi, two replicas of paintings Black Madonna of Częstochowa and Our Lady of Perpetual Help, a sculpture The Angel of Sadness and Death, and a 16th-century gunmetal cross, hang over a chancel. The windows are made from stained glass, decorated with images of twenty four Polish saints and beatified individuals, who were elevated to their status by Pope John Paul II. They were made by the Mysiakowski Workshop in Gliwice. A set of ceramic mosaics, depicting eight Polish saints and beatified individuals, are placed underneath the dome. They were designed by Barbara Bielińska, and created by Przemysław Górek. Walls inside are decoredted with mosaics of the Stations of the Cross, unveiled in 2000. One of the stainless glass windows depicts cardinal Stefan Wyszyński paying Homage to Pope John Paul II. They are also depicted on a wall painting in the choir loge. A mosaic is placed above the main door, depicting the mass held by Pope John Paul II at the Saviour Square in 1979, during his first pastoral visit to Poland. It is inscribed with Polish text which reads "Niech zstąpi Duch Twój i odnowi oblicze ziemi. Tej ziemi!". It translates to "Let Your Spirit descend and renew the face of the earth. This land!". The church also has a pipe organ, which was manufactured between 1998 and 2001, by the company Kamińscy, considered one of the leading manufacturers in the country.
