= Church of Our Lady of Loreto =

Church in Warsaw, Poland

Coordinates: 52.2567°N 21.0277°E

Loreto Church
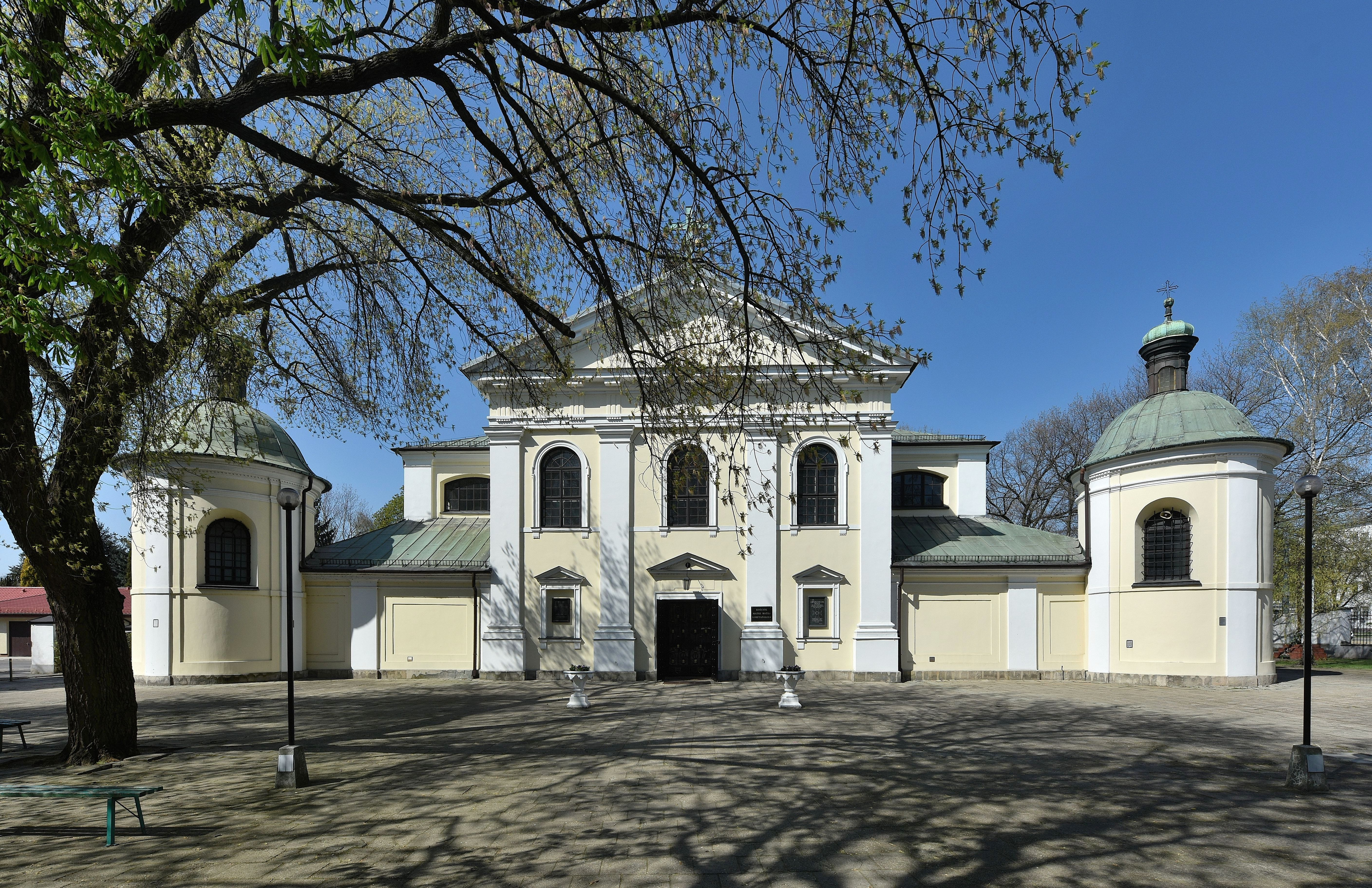
- Interactive map of the Loreto Church area

General information
- Architectural style: Baroque
- Location: Warsaw, Poland
- Construction started: 1640
- Completed: 1642
- Demolished: 1944

Design and construction
- Architect: Constantino Tencalla

The Church of Our Lady of Loreto (Polish: Kościół Matki Bożej Loretańskiej) is an ornate church in Praga, a district of Warsaw, Poland, on the east bank of the Vistula River. The church stands on Ratuszowa (City Hall) Street and is Praga's oldest monument. What may be seen today is a former chapel that on its south side was once attached to a baroque church and a Bernardine (Minor Friars) monastery.

== History ==
A chapel is all that remains of the old building that used to stand adjacent to the Bernardine church and monastery. On 4 October 1617 the cornerstone of the baroque church was laid in the presence of King Sigismund III Vasa. The St. Andrew's church was constructed between 1628 and 1638.

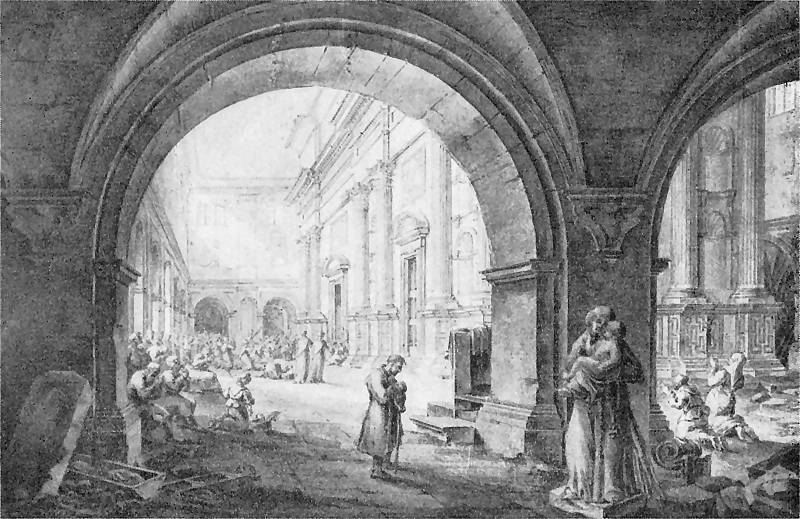
Interior of the Loreto Church in 1811, by Vogel

The Loreto Chapel was built between 1640 and 1642, in the southern part of the shrine. The construction was financially supported by King Władysław IV Vasa and Queen Cecilia Renata. Other members of the royal family, especially king's brothers, also participated in the construction. The chapel was built according to design by Royal architect Constantino Tencalla and modelled after Basilica della Santa Casa by Donato Bramante and Andrea Sansovino. Tencalla adjusted the original renaissance design to the baroque forms.

The copy of Mary's house, so-called Loreto house, was placed inside the chapel. According to legend the Loreto house was transported by angels from the Holy Land to Croatia, and later to the Italian town of Loreto in about 1294. Inside a small room of the chapel the statue of Virgin Mary of Loreto, brought from Italy at the king's initiative, was arranged. In 1641 Queen Cecilia Renata established golden crowns for the statue. The solemn consecration of the chapel occurred in 1642.

During the Deluge the chapel was ransacked and destroyed by Swedish and Brandenburgian forces. It was rebuilt thanks to donations of Stefan Warszycki, castellan of Kraków and Michał Warszycki, voivode of Sandomierz. Again during the Kościuszko Uprising the building was severely damaged, when the city was besieged by the Suvorov army.

The most precious item in the church was transferred here in 1807, when the Skaryszew Church was pulled down by the Napoleon's Army. It is a Gothic cedar statue of the Madonna and Child of Kamion. The statue was removed several times, when it finally found the place in the main altar of the Loreto Chapel (the statue of the Loreto Virgin was moved to the St. Anne' Church).

Around 1811 the Bernardine monastery was pulled down to build Praga fortifications, but the Church of Our Lady of Loreto was preserved in answer to a protest by the inhabitants.

During the Warsaw Uprising the church was badly damaged by German artillery fire. It was rebuilt in 1953 to Alfons Kropiwnicki design.

== See also ==
- Places of worship in Warsaw
- St. Hyacinth's Church

== Images ==
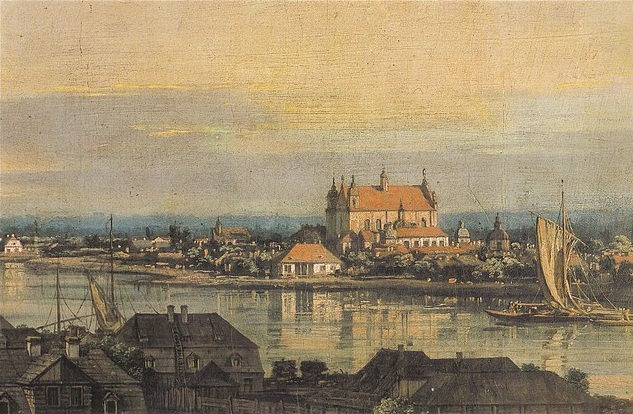
Bernardine monastery in 1772, by Bellotto ("Canaletto")

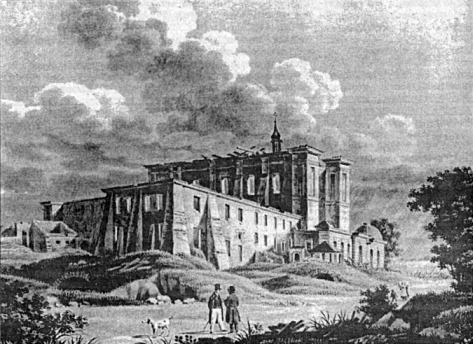
Bernardine monastery during demolition in 1811

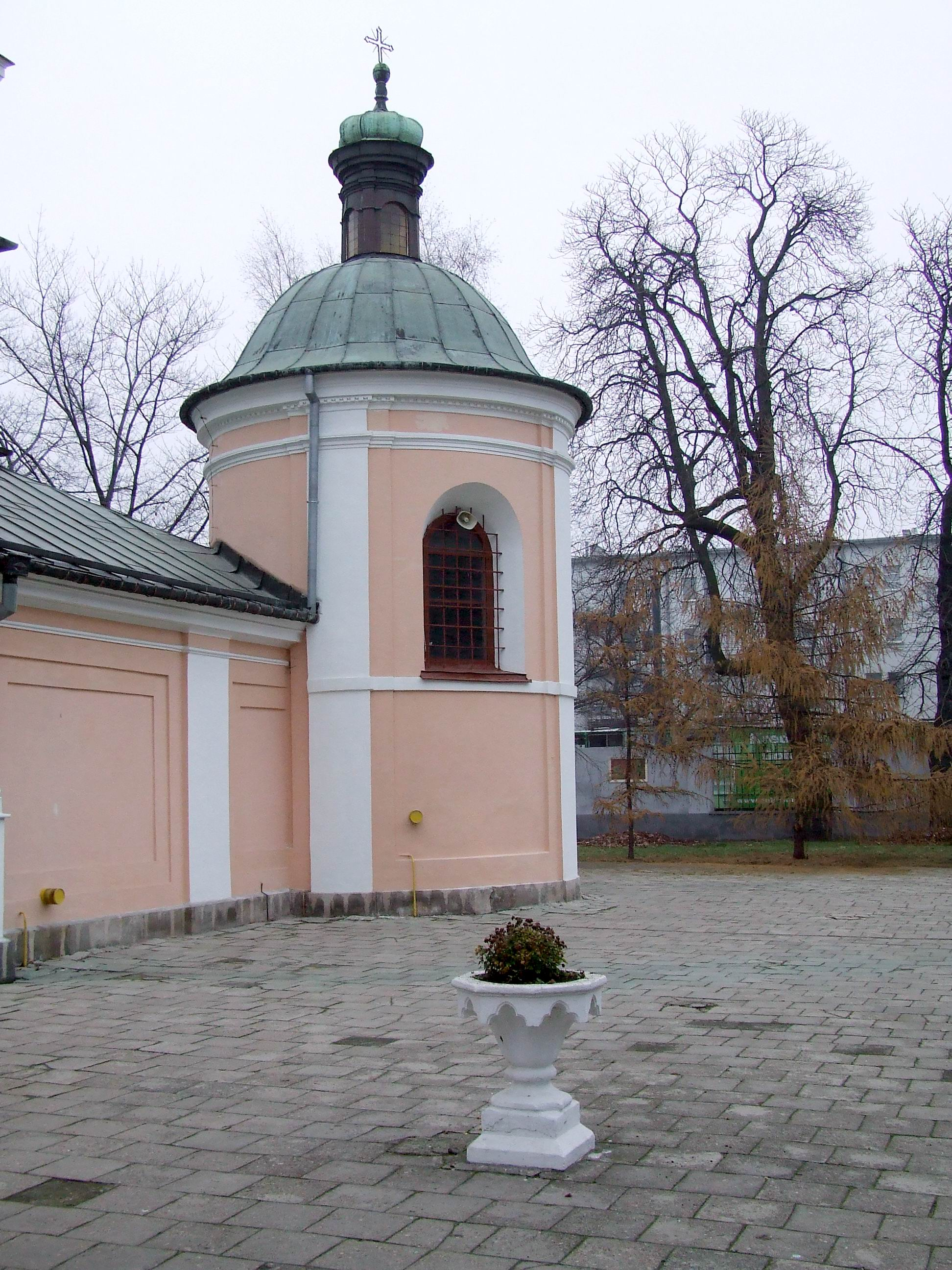
Early baroque side tower, 1640s

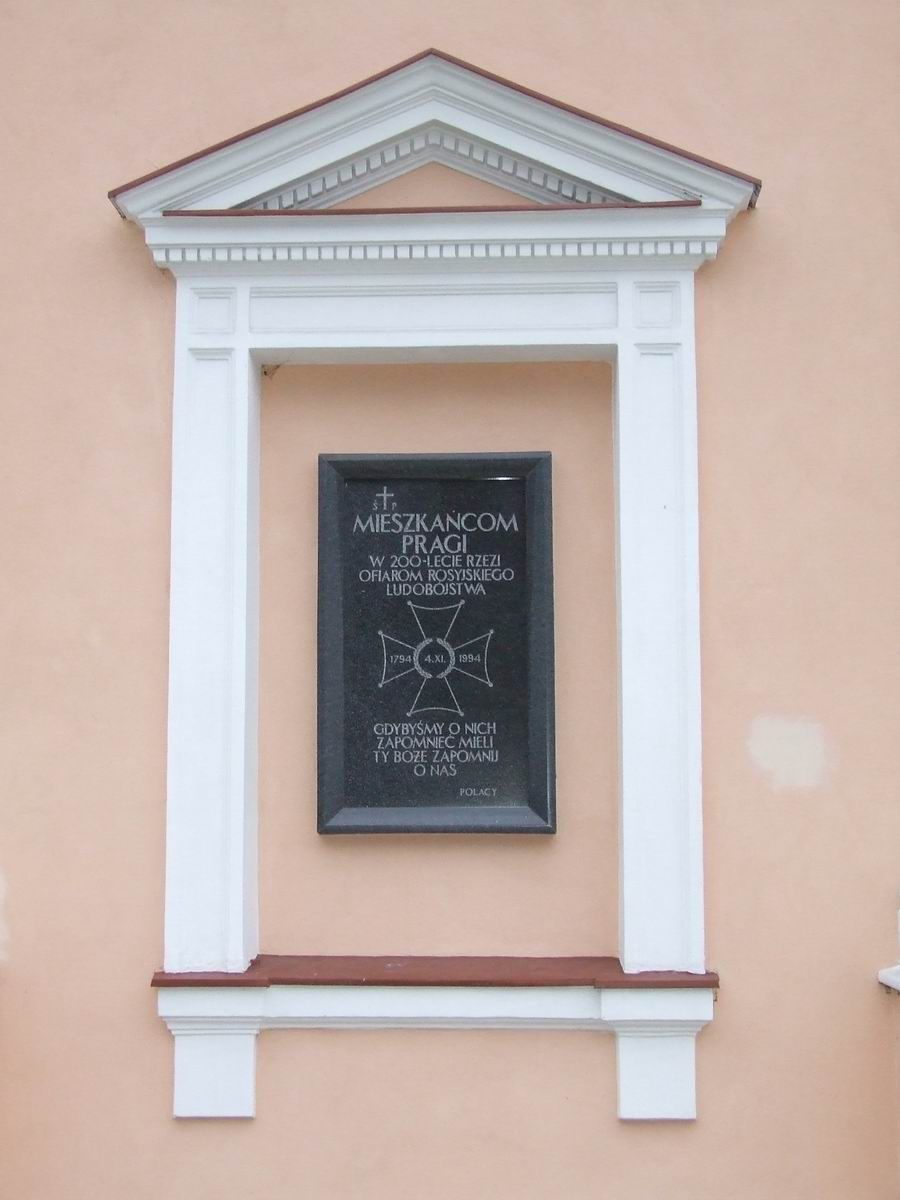
Plaque commemorating the victims of the Massacre of Praga
