= First Congregation of the Baptist Church in Warsaw =

Baptist church in Warsaw, Poland

Coordinates: 52°14′14.24″N 20°59′27.56″E

- Pierwszy Zbór Kościoła Chrześcijan Baptystów w Warszawie
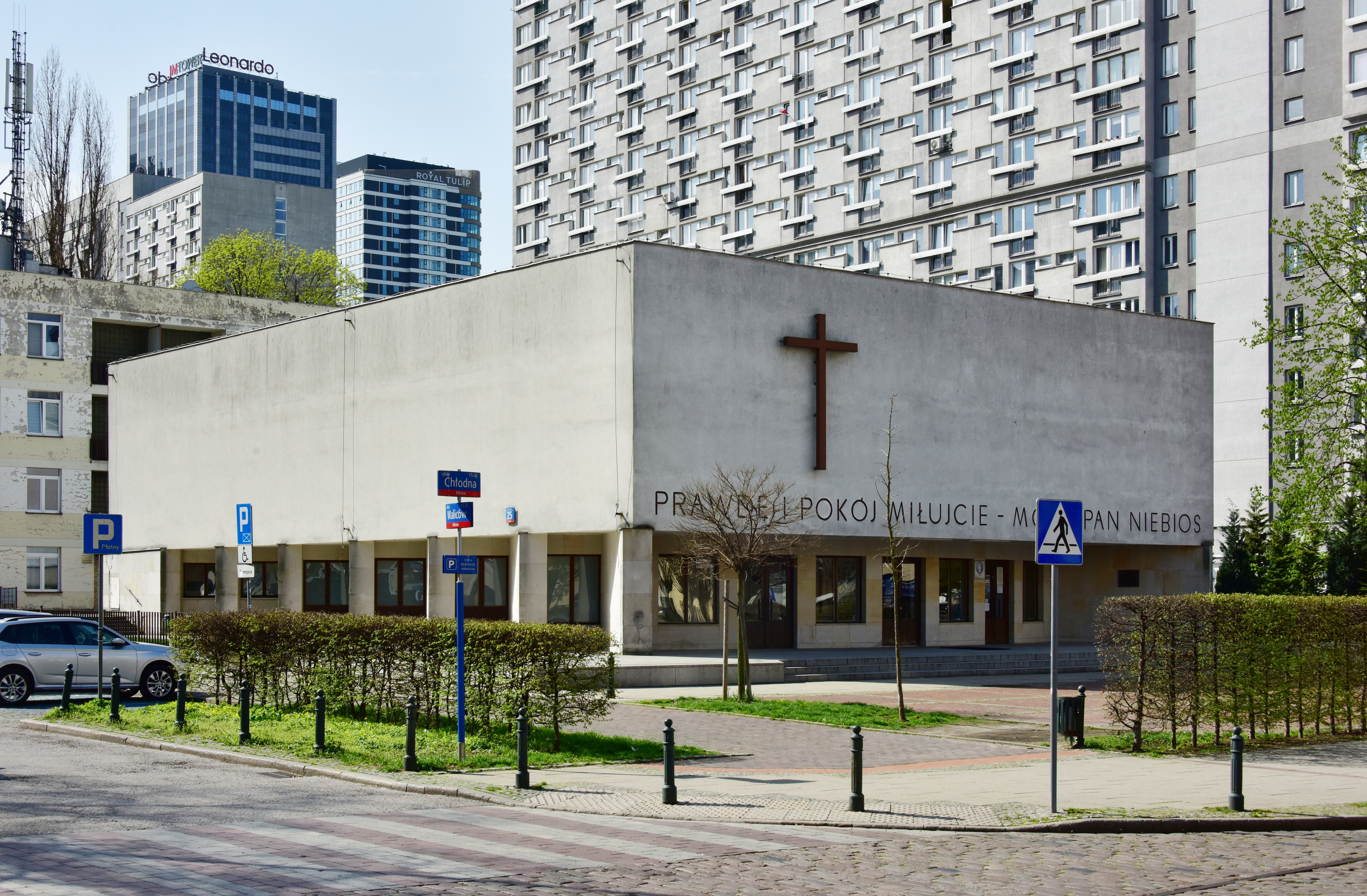
- Congregation's chapel

- Location in Poland
- Location: 25 Waliców Street, Warsaw, Poland
- Denomination: Baptist Christian Church of the Republic of Poland
- Website: https://baptysci.waw.pl

History
- Status: Active
- Consecrated: 1961

Architecture
- Functional status: Chapel

The First Congregation of the Baptist Church in Warsaw (Polish: I Zbór Kościoła Chrześcijan Baptystów w Warszawie) is a congregation of the Baptist Christian Church of the Republic of Poland in the city of Warsaw, Poland.

== Beliefs and programs ==
The congregations holds to its denomination's statement of belief, as well as the 1930 Polish Baptists' Confession of Faith and the 1689 Baptist Confession of Faith.

Services are held on Sunday mornings and Wednesday evenings. The congregation runs a Sunday school for children, a youth group, a Bible school, and various Bible study groups. The congregation also has a choir, which celebrated its 100th anniversary in 2019.

== History ==
In 1871, Józef Herb began holding Baptist meetings in his apartment at 54 Nowolipie Street. By the end of 1874, the Warsaw congregation had 56 members, and about 100 people attended the services. In 1884, a hall at 12 Chłodna Street was rented for congregational use. In 1908, the congregation's first chapel, built at 54 Żelazna Street, was dedicated.

On September 9, 1961, the building at 25 Waliców Street was opened. The following day, 26 people were baptized. The chapel was designed to seat 300 people, while the congregation at that time numbered 130 members.

In 1978, Billy Graham preached to the congregation during his visit to Poland.

In the 1980s, the branches in Kielce and Żyrardów became independent congregations.

In 2015, the congregation withdrew from the ecumenical movement and called on the leadership of the Baptist Church to withdraw from the Polish Ecumenical Council.

In 2024, the congregation’s branch in Nowy Dwór Mazowiecki became an independent congregation. That same year, work began on the expansion of the congregation’s building, which is scheduled to be completed in 2026.

== Gallery ==
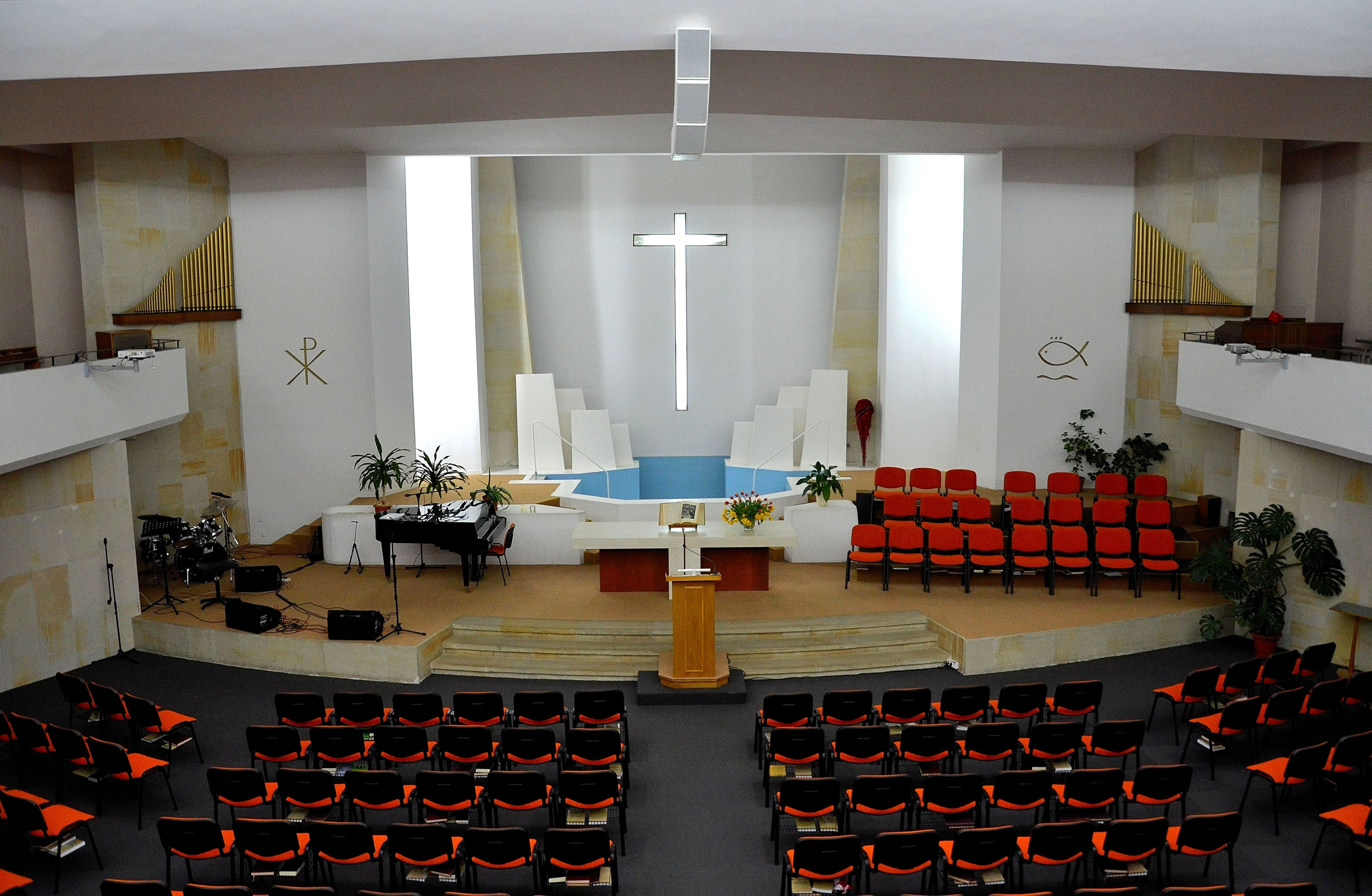
Interior of the chapel

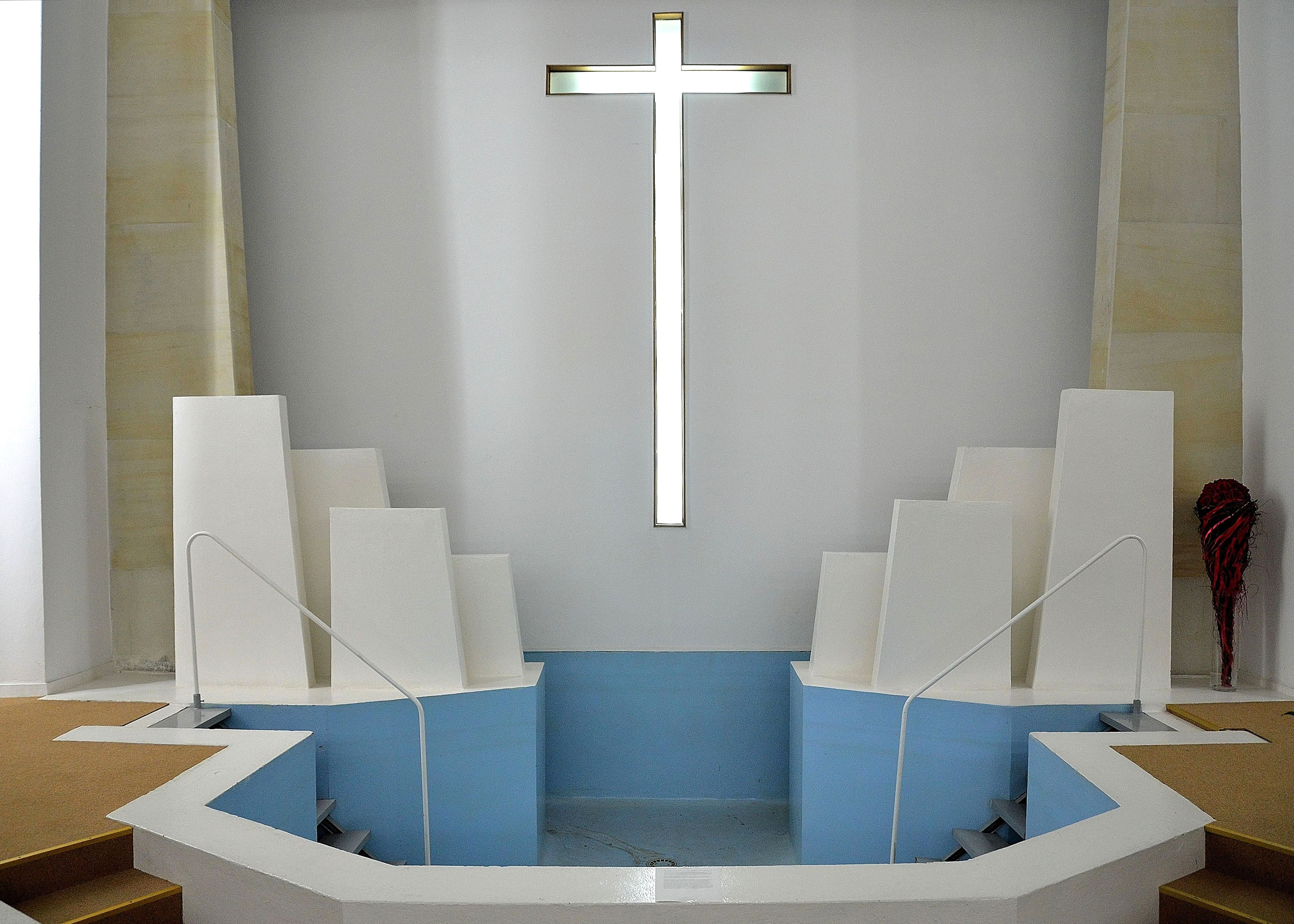
Baptistery

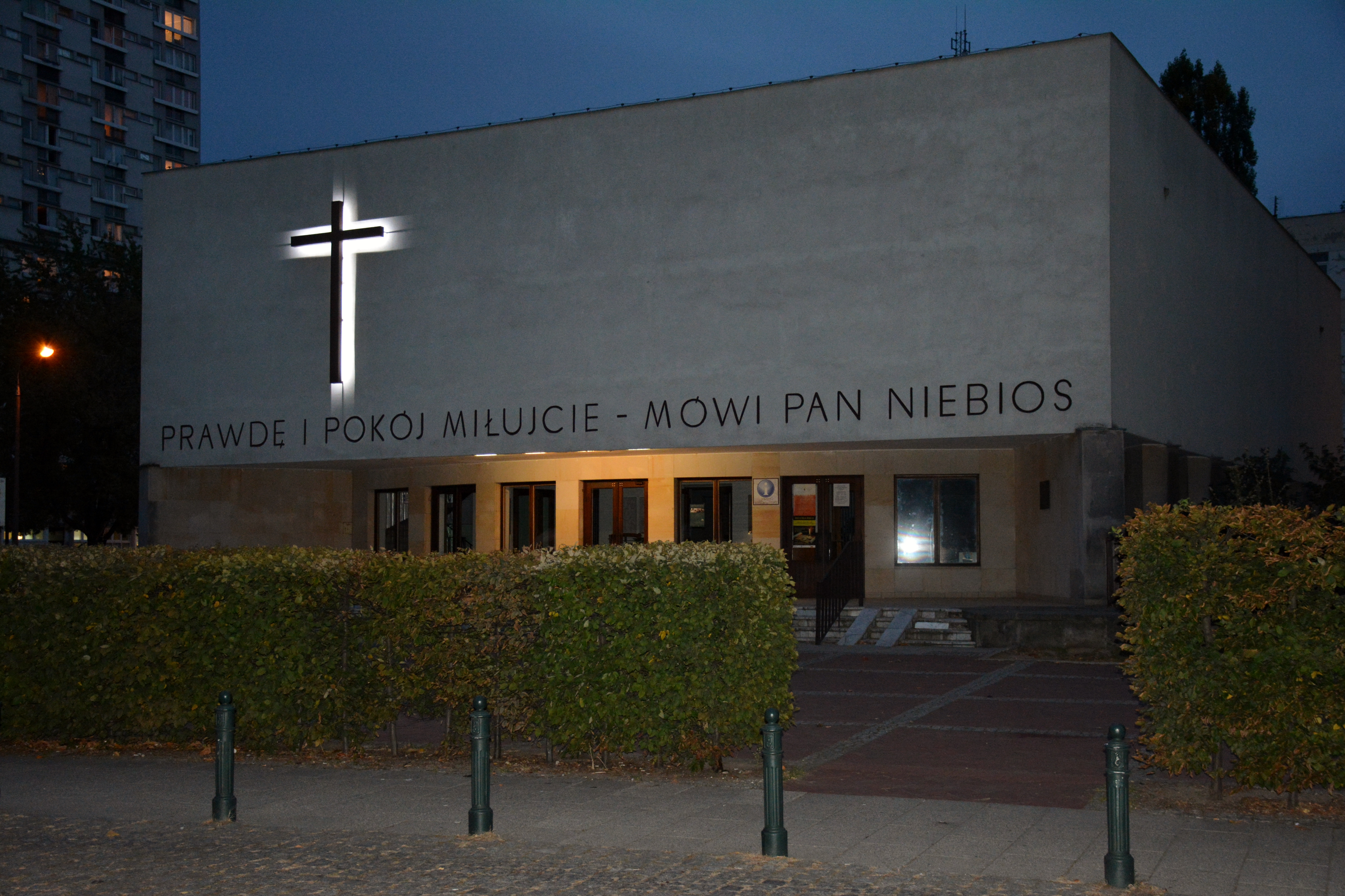
Building at night

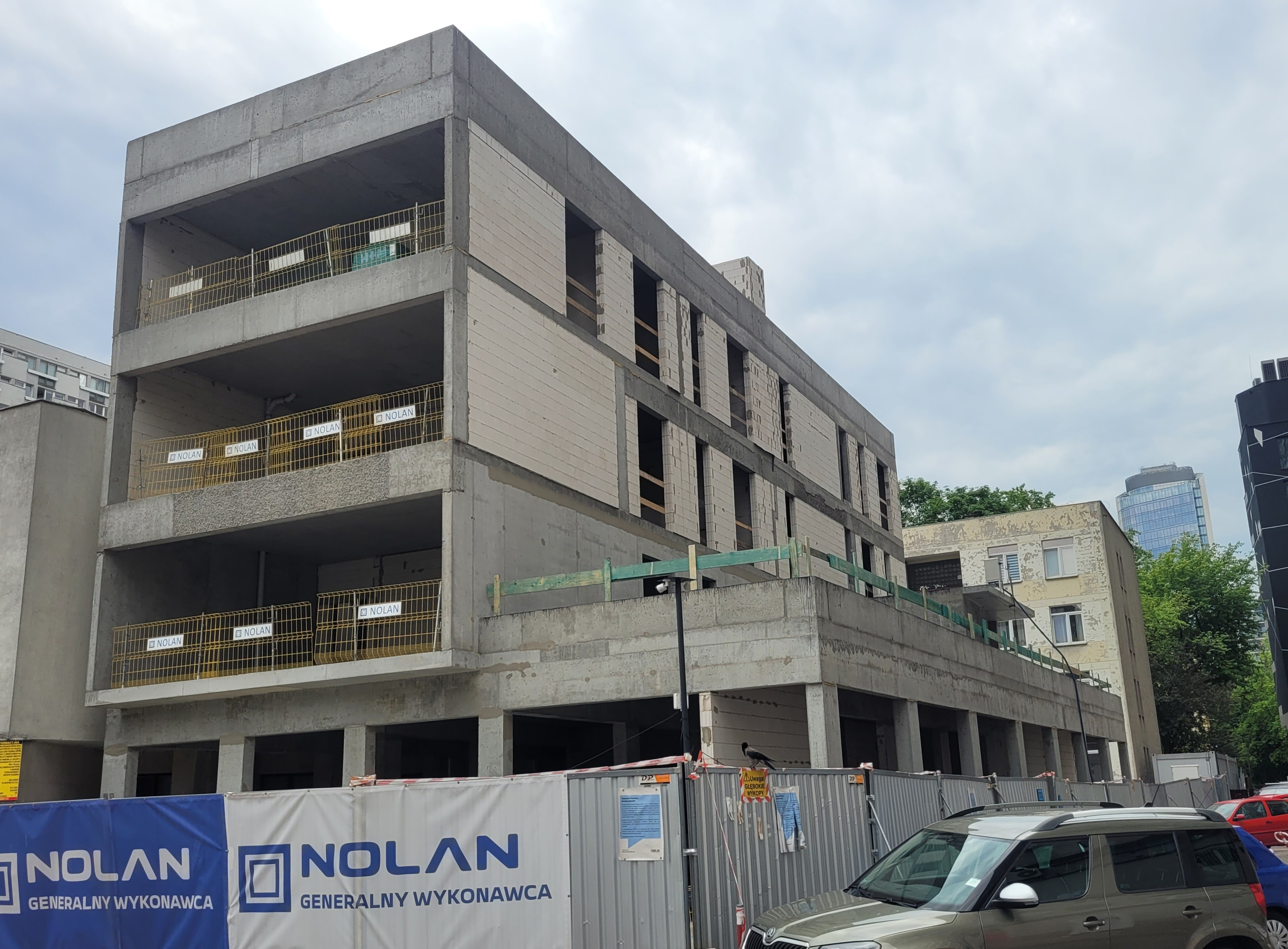
Building expansion, June 2026
