= Chabad Lubavitch of Poland =

Chabad synagogue in Warsaw, Poland

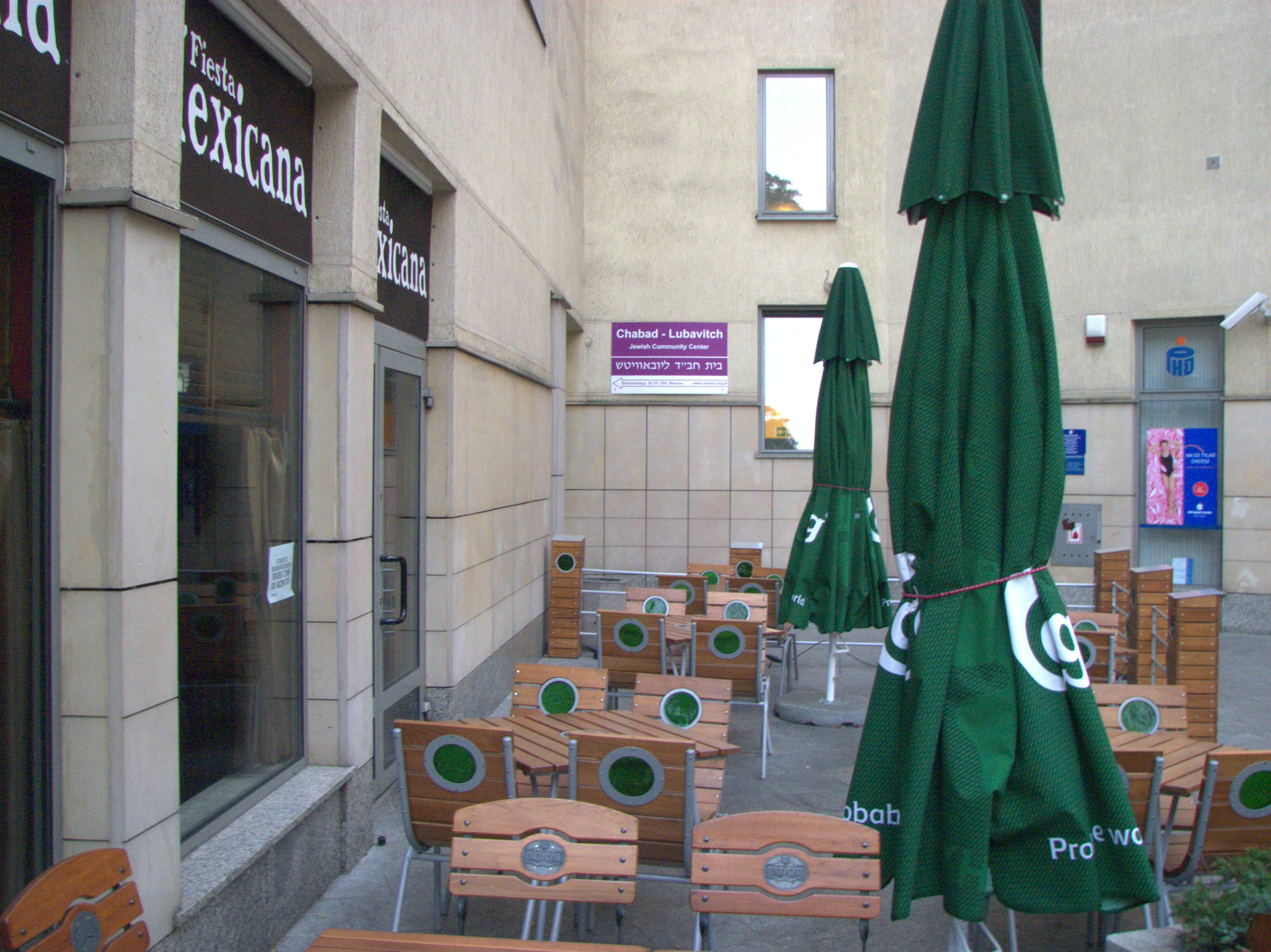
- Synagogue entrance and kosher restaurant, in 2007

- Location of the synagogue in Masovian Voivodeship

Religion
- Affiliation: Hasidic Judaism
- Rite: Chabad
- Ecclesiastical or organizational status: Synagogue
- Leadership: Rabbi Sholem Ber Stambler
- Status: Active

Location
- Location: 9/508 Słomińskiego Street, Warsaw, Masovian Voivodeship
- Country: Poland
- Interactive map of Chabad Lubavitch of Poland
- Coordinates: 52°13′47″N 21°00′42″E

Architecture
- Type: Synagogue architecture
- Founder: Rabbi Sholem Ber Stambler; Mrs Dina Stambler
- Established: 2005 (as a congregation)
- Completed: 2005

Website
- chabadpoland.org/en/

The Chabad Lubavitch of Poland, also called the Chabad House Warsaw, Poland, is a Chabad Hasidic Jewish congregation and synagogue, located at 19/508 Słomińskiego Street, in Warsaw, in the Masovian Voivodeship of Poland.

Another temple of this type in Poland (ongoing ownership disputes) is the Isaac Jakubowicz Synagogue in Kraków.

The synagogue was founded in December 2005. The prayer room is part of the Jewish Centre, where a yeshiva, kosher restaurant and library are also located. The current rabbi of the synagogue is Chabad Rabbi Shalom Ber Stambler.

== See also ==
- Chronology of Jewish Polish history
- Chabad house
- History of the Jews in Poland
- List of active synagogues in Poland
