= Church of St. Felix of Cantalice, Warsaw =

Church of St. Felix of Cantalice
- Kościół św. Feliksa z Kantalicjo
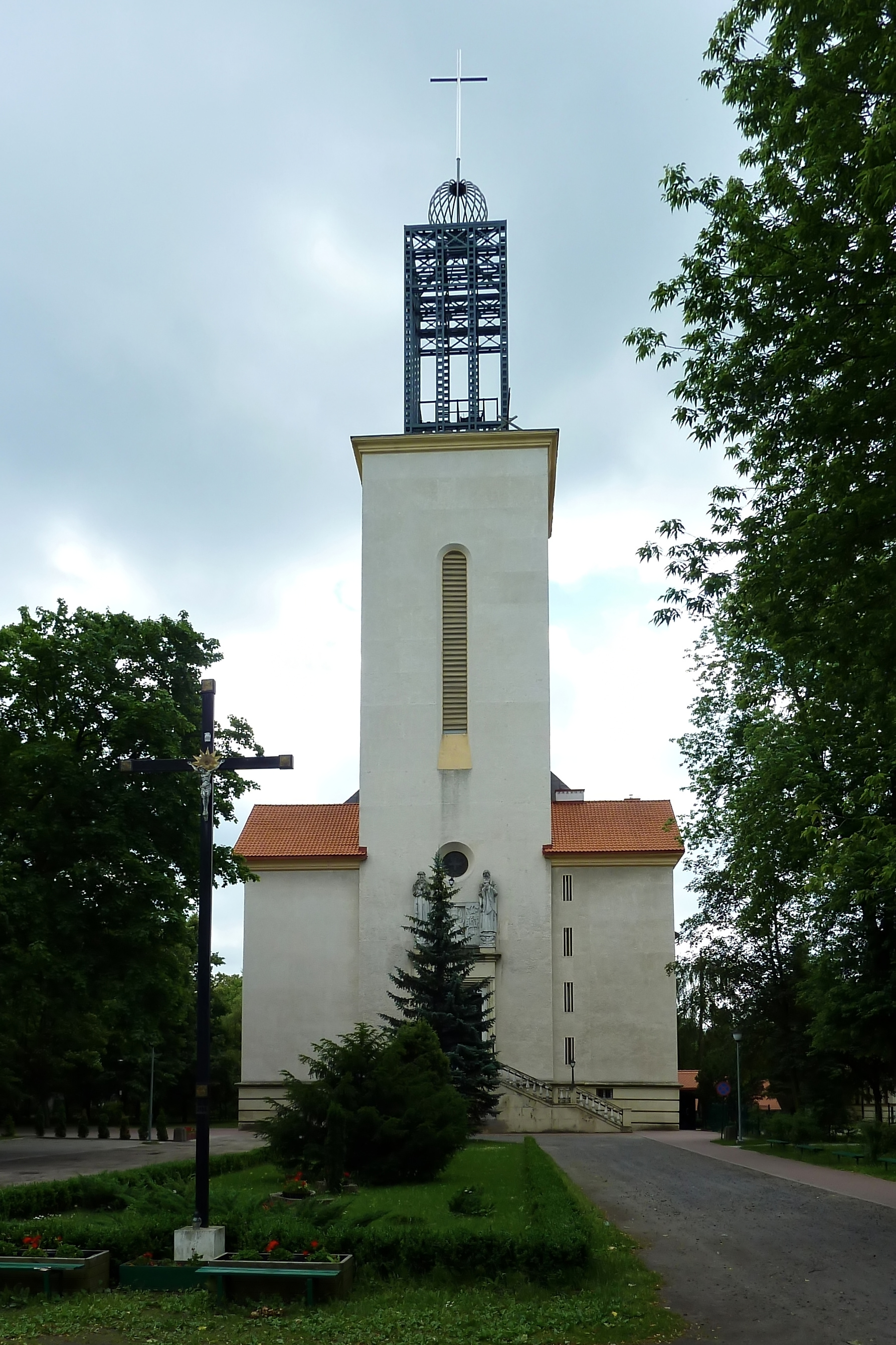
- The church of St. Felix of Cantalice

- 52.236889°N 21.156131°E
- Location: Warsaw
- Country: Poland
- Denomination: Roman Catholic
- Website: parafiaswfeliks.pl

History
- Status: Parish church
- Dedication: Felix of Cantalice

Architecture
- Functional status: Active
- Architect: Zygmunt Gawlik
- Completed: 1935

Administration
- Archdiocese: Warsaw
- Deanery: Praga
- Parish: St. Felix of Cantalice Warsaw

The Church of St. Felix of Cantalice (Polish: Kościół św. Feliksa z Kantalicjo) in Warsaw, Poland, is located in the Wawer district, on Kościuszkowców Street. It was founded in 1935.

== History ==
The parish was erected in 1958. The present parish church was built in the years 1928–1935 as the Felician Sisters' monastery church.

The decision to build the church was made in 1927, and on August 29, 1929, Cardinal Aleksander Kakowski laid the foundation stone. In 1935, the church was consecrated. The church was designed by the Polish architect Zygmunt Gawlik.

On September 15, 1939, Adolf Hitler watched the defence of Warsaw from the church tower that dominated the neighborhood.

In November 1944, the church was damaged by German artillery fire. Since the church tower was an excellent landmark for the enemy, on November 28, 1944, Polish sappers, at the request of the sisters, blew it up. In 2007, the reconstruction of the main church tower was started and it was completed on March 12, 2008.
