= Baptist Christian Church of the Republic of Poland =

Christian denomination in Poland

- Kościół Chrześcijan Baptystów w Rzeczypospolitej Polskiej
- Classification: Evangelical Christianity
- Scripture: Bible
- Theology: Baptist
- Associations: Polish Ecumenical Council; European Baptist Federation; Baptist World Alliance
- Language: Polish
- Headquarters: Warsaw
- Territory: Poland
- Origin: 19th century
- Congregations: 102
- Members: 5,390 (2023)
- Official website: https://baptysci.pl

The Baptist Christian Church of the Republic of Poland (Polish: Kościół Chrześcijan Baptystów w Rzeczypospolitej Polskiej) is a Baptist Christian denomination in Poland. It is a member of the Polish Ecumenical Council, the European Baptist Federation and the Baptist World Alliance. The headquarters is in Warsaw.

== History ==
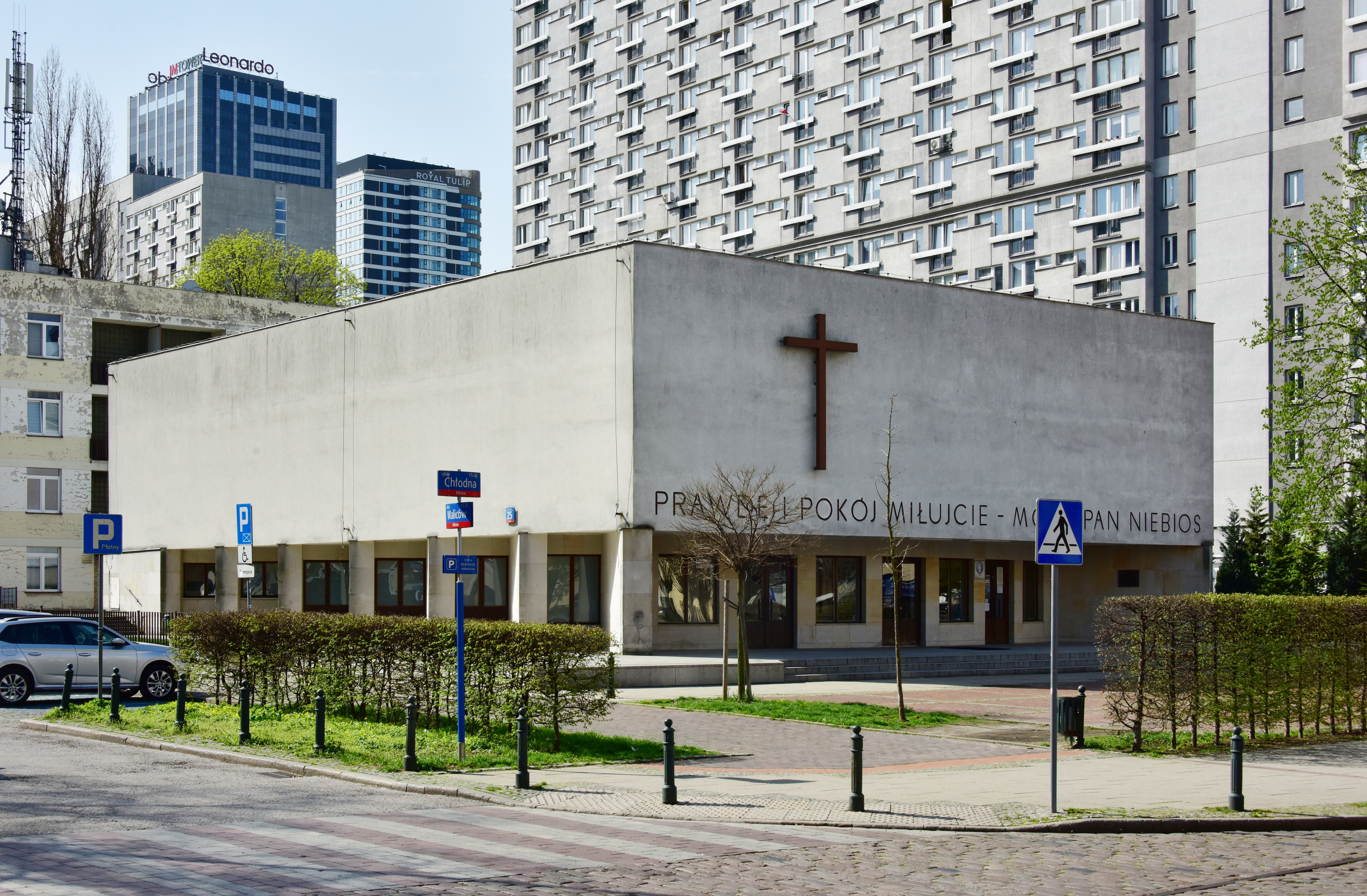
First Congregation of the Baptist Church in Warsaw.

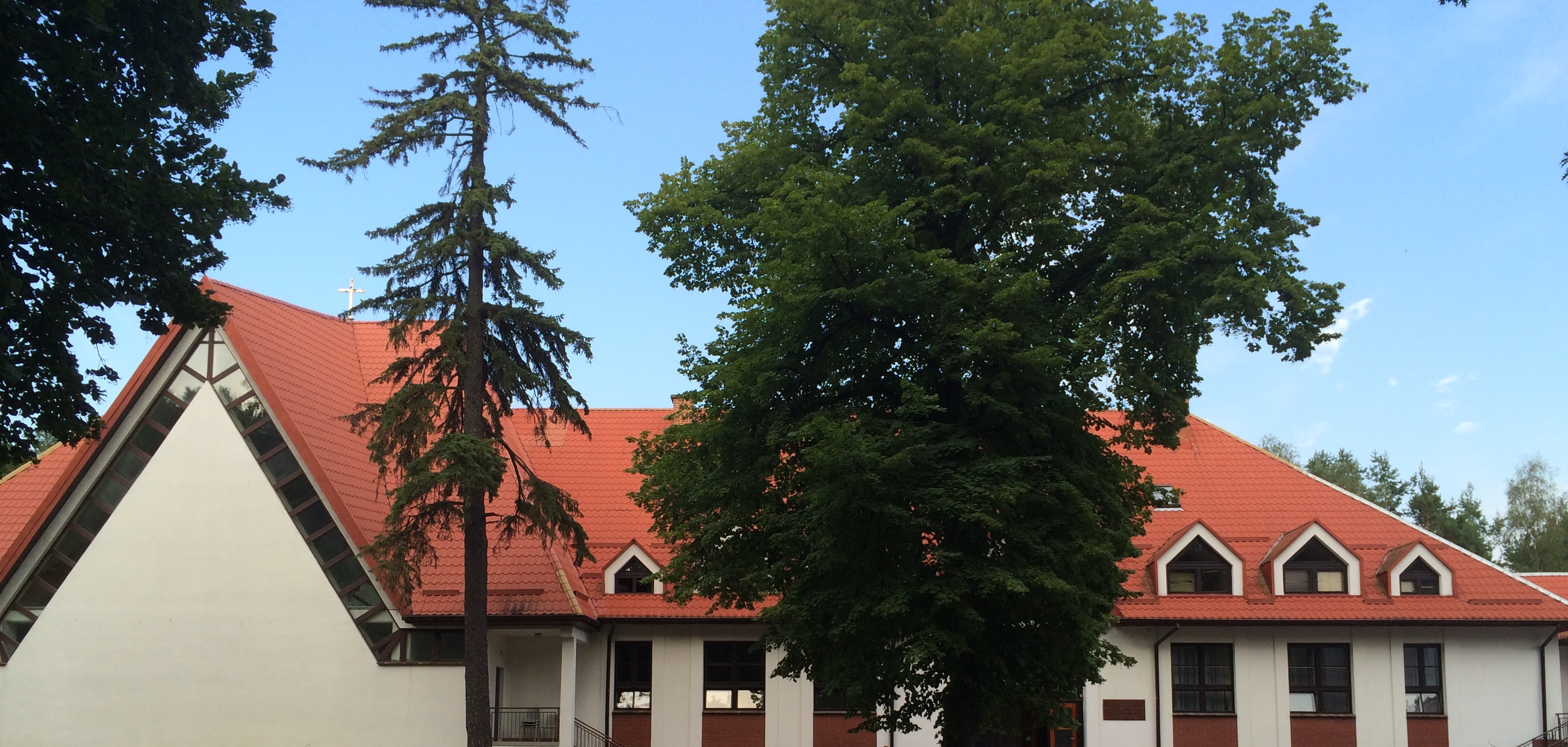
Warsaw Baptist Theological Seminary in Warsaw.

Modern Baptist work began in Poland in 1844. The first typical Polish congregation was formed in the village of Zelow in 1872. Polish Baptists adopted the German Baptist Confession of 1847 as their own confession.

In 1922, the Union of Slavic Baptists in Poland was formed, and the Union of the Baptist Churches of the German Language was formed in 1928. The unions of German-speaking and Polish-speaking Baptists existed until World War II, when they were forced into a merger with other evangelical Christian bodies. In 1946, the Baptist Christian Church of the Republic of Poland was founded. In 1994, it founded the Warsaw Baptist Theological Seminary in Warsaw.

According to a census published by the association in 2023, it claimed 102 churches and 5,390 members.

== See also ==
- Christianity in Poland
- Baptist beliefs
- Jesus Christ
- Believers' Church
