= Visitationist Church =

Coordinates: 52°14′28″N 21°1′03″E

Visitationists Church Kościół Wizytek (in Polish)
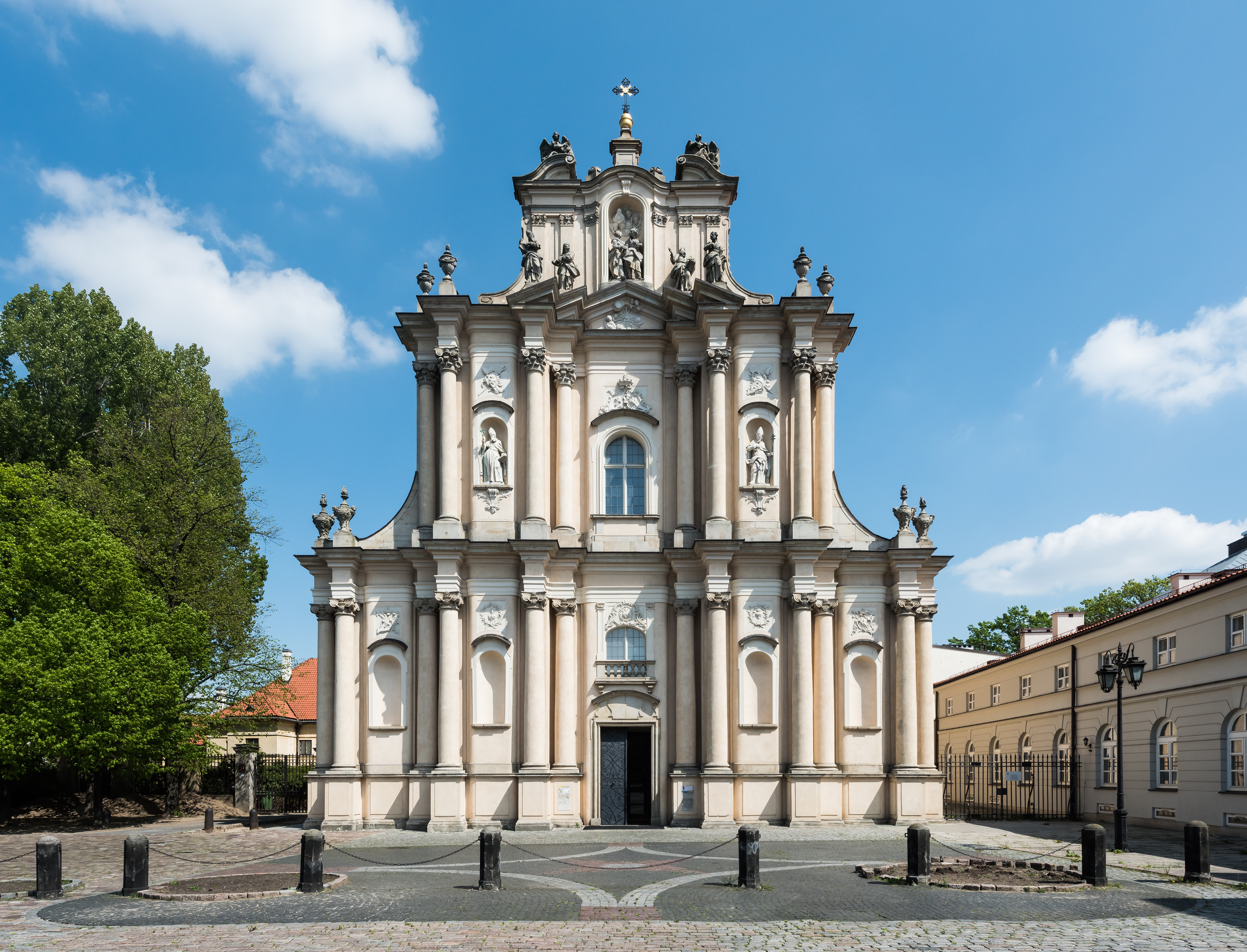
- Visitationist Church.

General information
- Architectural style: Baroque
- Location: Warsaw, Poland
- Construction started: 1728 (Current church)
- Completed: 1765

Design and construction
- Architects: Karol Antoni Bay; Ephraim Schröger

Historic Monument of Poland
- Designated: 1994-09-08
- Part of: Warsaw – historic city center with the Royal Route and Wilanów
- Reference no.: M.P. 1994 nr 50 poz. 423

The Visitationist Church (Polish: Kościół Wizytek), formally the Church of the Protection of St Joseph (Polish: Kościół Opieki św. Józefa), is a Roman Catholic church at 34 Krakowskie Przedmieście in Warsaw, Poland. It is a notable example of late Baroque architecture, with elements of Rococo decoration.

The Order of the Visitation established its first Warsaw convent in 1654 under the patronage of Queen Marie Louise Gonzaga. Construction of the present church began in 1728 under Carlo Antonio Bay, was interrupted in 1733, and resumed in 1754 under Jakub Fontana. The church was consecrated on 20 September 1761 by Bishop Józef Andrzej Załuski, although construction and finishing work continued into the early 1760s.

The church survived the Second World War and retains much of its historic interior, including a boat-shaped pulpit.

== History ==
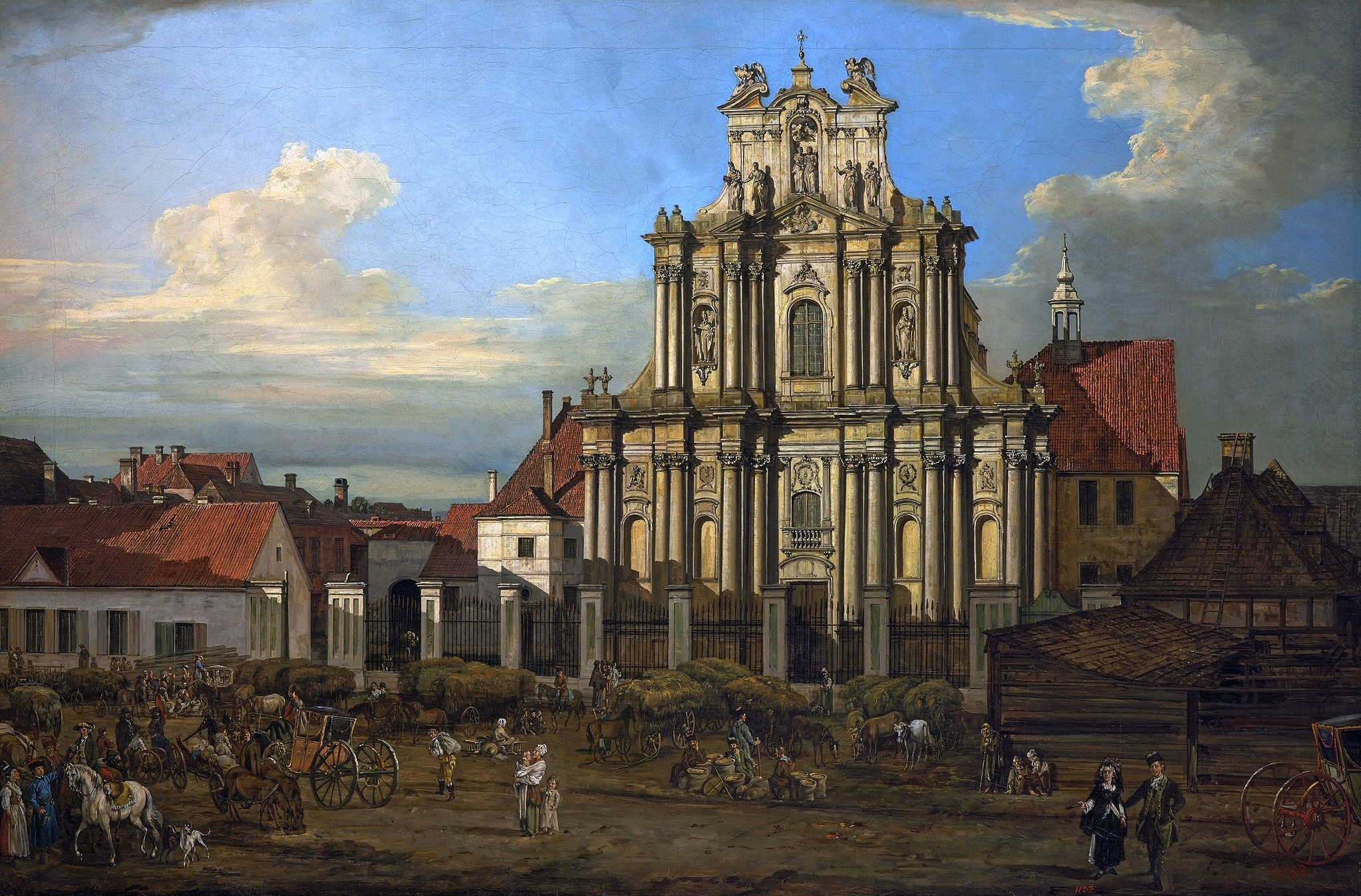
Visitationist Church in 1780 by Bernardo Bellotto.

The first wooden church was established in 1651 by Queen Marie Louise Gonzaga de Nevers for the French Order of the Visitation of the Blessed Virgin Mary. This church was burned down by the Swedes during the Deluge in 1656.

In 1664 the Visitationists started to build a new oblong church. The first stone was laid by primate Wacław Leszczyński. This unfinished church burned in 1695. After the fire, the church was restored again. The new foundation was made in 1728 by a stateswoman Elżbieta Sieniawska following the plan of her private architect Karol Antoni Bay. The structural work was finished in 1761. The finishing touch was finally given in 1765.

The church's main claim to fame, in Polish eyes, is that Fryderyk Chopin used to play the church organ here, mainly during services for schoolchildren.

In front of this late-baroque church stands a statue of Cardinal Stefan Wyszyński, primate of Poland from 1948 to 1981.

== Interior ==
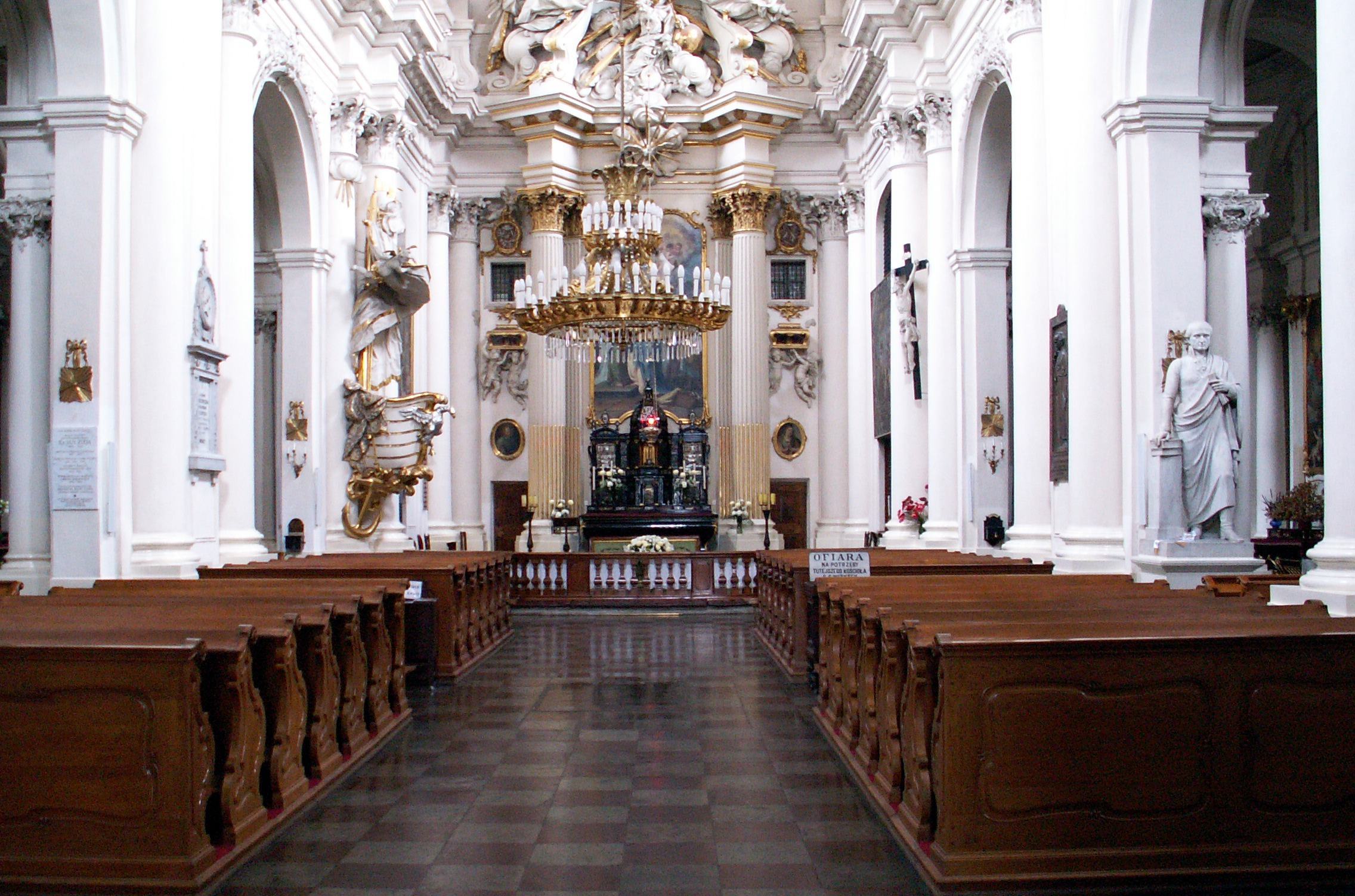
Interior

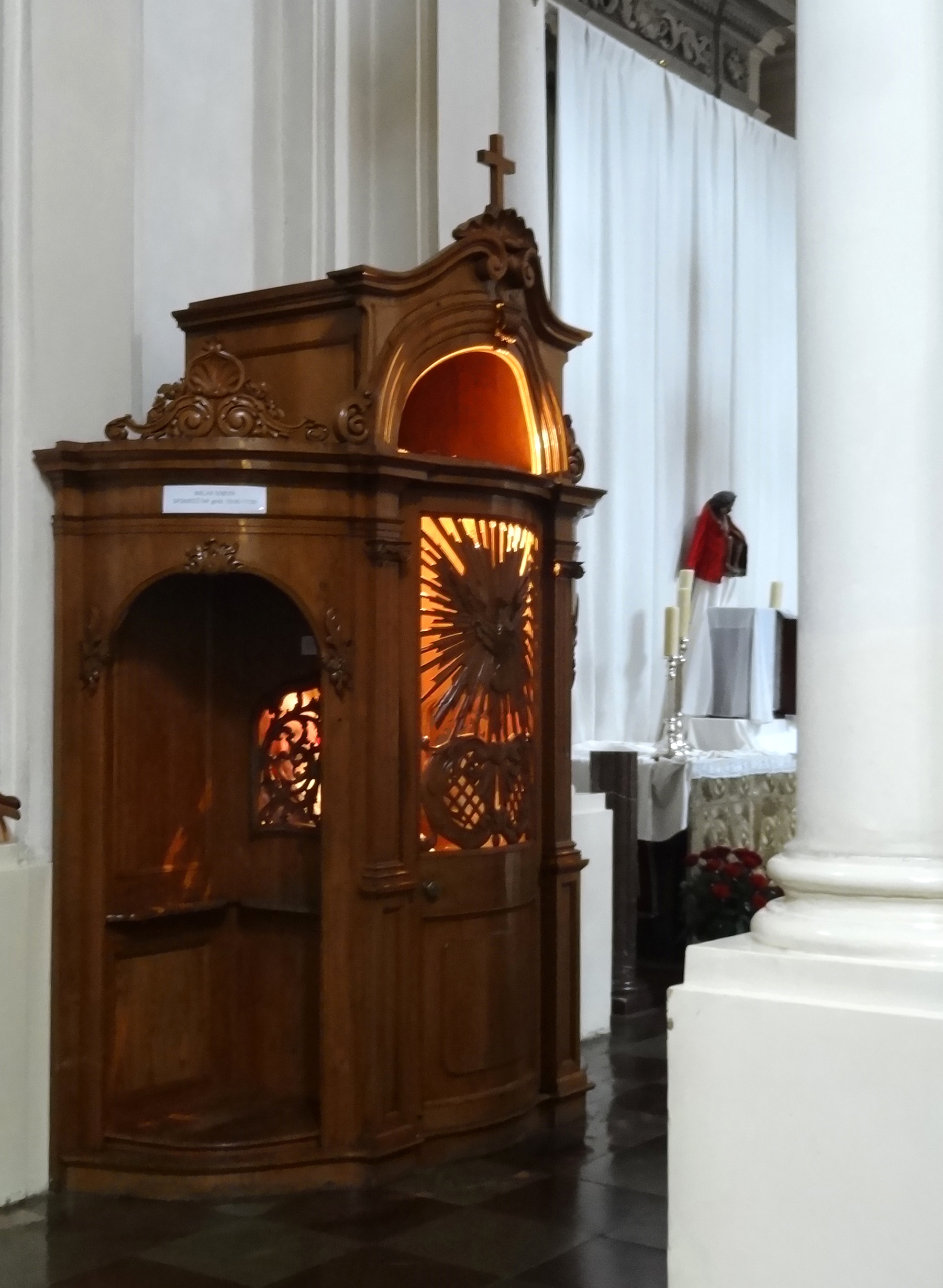
A wooden confessional on Easter Saturday with the lights on to signal a priest is inside ready to hear confessions

The nave with main altar and 6 side chapels in Baroque style are embellished with Rococo decorations. There is an unique pulpit in a shape of boat and also a lot of old sculptures, paintings by old Polish, Italian and French masters (including Saint Louis de Gonzaga by Daniel Schultz), portraits of famous and noble Poles and tabernacle made of ebony and silver. This tabernacle, which initially was placed in the chapel of Villa Regia Palace in Warsaw, was donated to the church by Queen Marie Louise Gonzaga de Nevers in 1654.

== See also ==
- St Martin's Church
- Church of the Holy Cross
- Field Cathedral of the Polish Army
- St. Florian's Cathedral
