= St. Barbara's Chapel, Warsaw =

Coordinates: 52.226513°N 21.00717°E

Chapel of St. Barbara
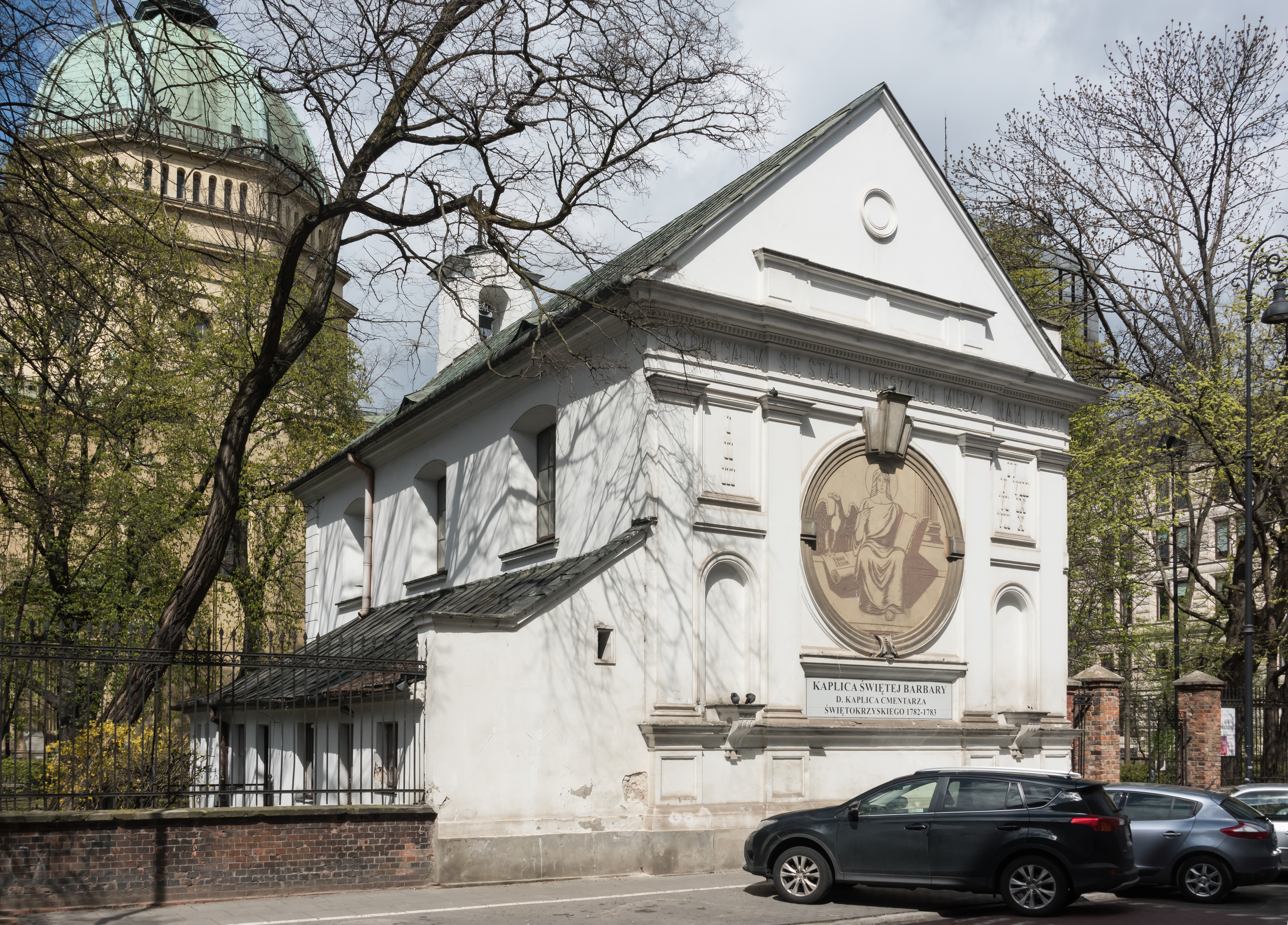

General information
- Architectural style: Neo-Romanesque
- Location: Warsaw, Poland
- Construction started: 1880
- Completed: 1883
- Demolished: 1944

Design and construction
- Architects: Edward Cichocki (19th century), Stanisław Marzyński (post-war reconstruction)

The Chapel of St. Barbara (Polish: Kaplica św. Barbary) is a Roman Catholic chapel in the Śródmieście district of Warsaw, Poland.

== History ==
The origins of the church date back to 1781, when a small chapel was erected at the Świętokrzyski Cemetery. In 1866 the cemetery chapel was turned into the parish church. The surroundings of the small church rapidly developed in the second half of the 19th century. The church, though located in the central part of Warsaw, had capacity of only 200 people. A new building was greatly needed so in 1880 a new building was built and the new church was ceremonially consecrated by Archbishop Wincenty Popiel in June 1883. The new three-nave building could hold 3,000 people.

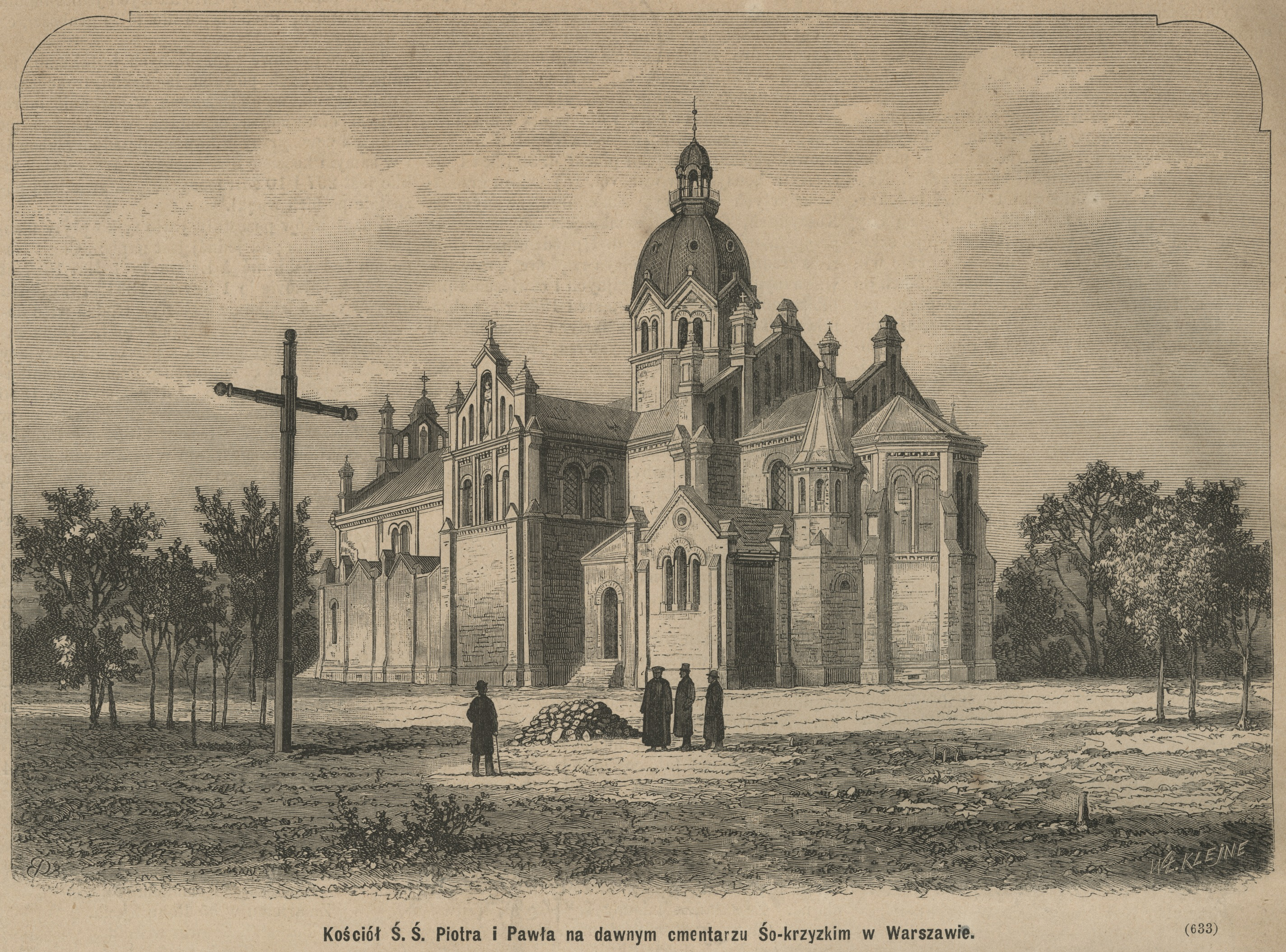
Church in the 1885

At the beginning of World War II, it was damaged, when ammunition located in the church exploded. The church witnessed heavy fighting during the Warsaw Uprising of 1944. After the fall of the uprising, Nazi authorities expelled the clergy and worshippers and blew up the building. The destruction was heavy, as only the foundations and basements survived. From 1946 the church was gradually rebuilt again. The reconstruction was finally finished in November 1957 and consecrated by Cardinal Stefan Wyszyński. While the exterior of the church is similar to the pre-war one, its interior is different.

== See also ==
St. Florian's Cathedral
