= St. Martin's Church, Warsaw =

Coordinates: 52°14′54″N 21°0′45″E

St. Martin's Church Kościół św. Marcina (in Polish)
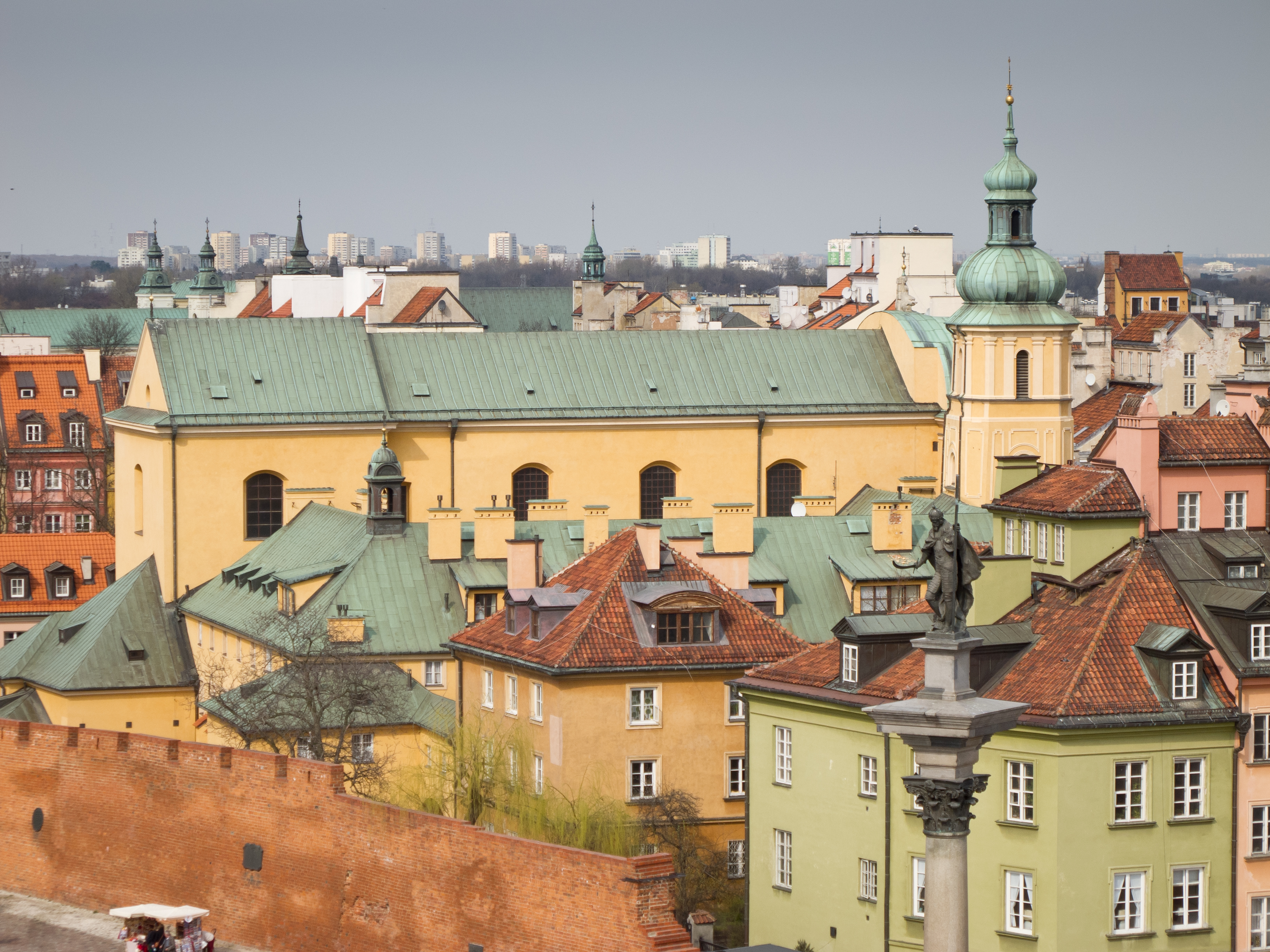
- View of St. Martin's Church from a terrace in Castle Square.
- St. Martin's Church; Kościół św. Marcina (in Polish)
- Country: Poland
- Denomination: Catholic

Architecture
- Functional status: Active
- Architect: Karol Antoni Bay
- Style: Rococo (1752)
- Groundbreaking: 1353
- Demolished: 1944

Administration
- Archdiocese: Warsaw

UNESCO World Heritage Site
- Type: Cultural
- Criteria: ii, vi
- Designated: 1980
- Part of: Historic Centre of Warsaw
- Reference no.: 30bis

Historic Monument of Poland
- Designated: 1994-09-08
- Part of: Warsaw – historic city center with the Royal Route and Wilanów
- Reference no.: M.P. 1994 nr 50 poz. 423

St. Martin's Church (Polish: Kościół św. Marcina) is a church in Warsaw, Poland. It is located on ulica Piwna ("Beer Street") in the Polish capital's Old Town.

== History ==
It was established in 1353 together with the adjacent Augustinians cloister and a hospital of the Holy Spirit intra muros by Siemowit III duke of Masovia and his wife Eufemia. In 1571 the famous Wojciech Oczko was made a hospital doctor. The church itself, which was a stone, gothic building, was erected at the turn of 14th and 15th century. Its entrance was located from the side of the town walls, not from Piwna street where it is today. The temple had three altars: the main altar of St. Martin and side altars of the Holy Ghost and of St. Dorothy.

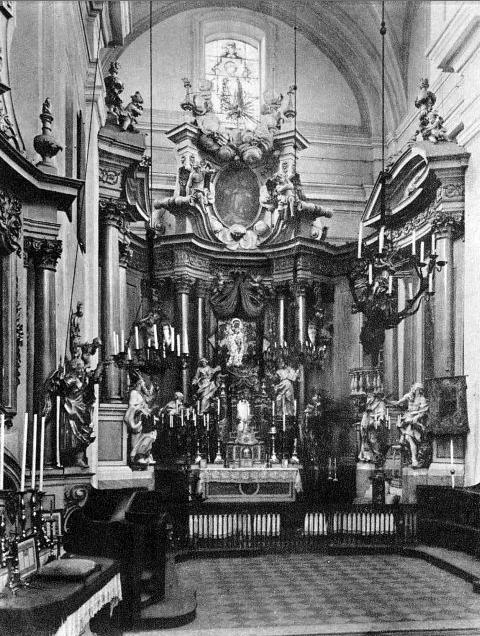
The interior before 1939.

In the 17th century in the churchyard of the Augustinians' Monastery sessions of local Mazovian parliament were organised. After some fires, which destroyed the church in the 15th and 17th centuries, it was converted in baroque style by Giovanni Spinola from Italy. Also at that time the church was reoriented, the main entrance was changed to Piwna Street, and the altar was moved to the south-western side (to the side of the town walls). In the 17th century, a good standard orchestra was maintained by the Augustinians, which performed in the church. Inside, Adam Jarzębski was buried, a musician and composer that worked for the kings of the Vasa Dynasty.

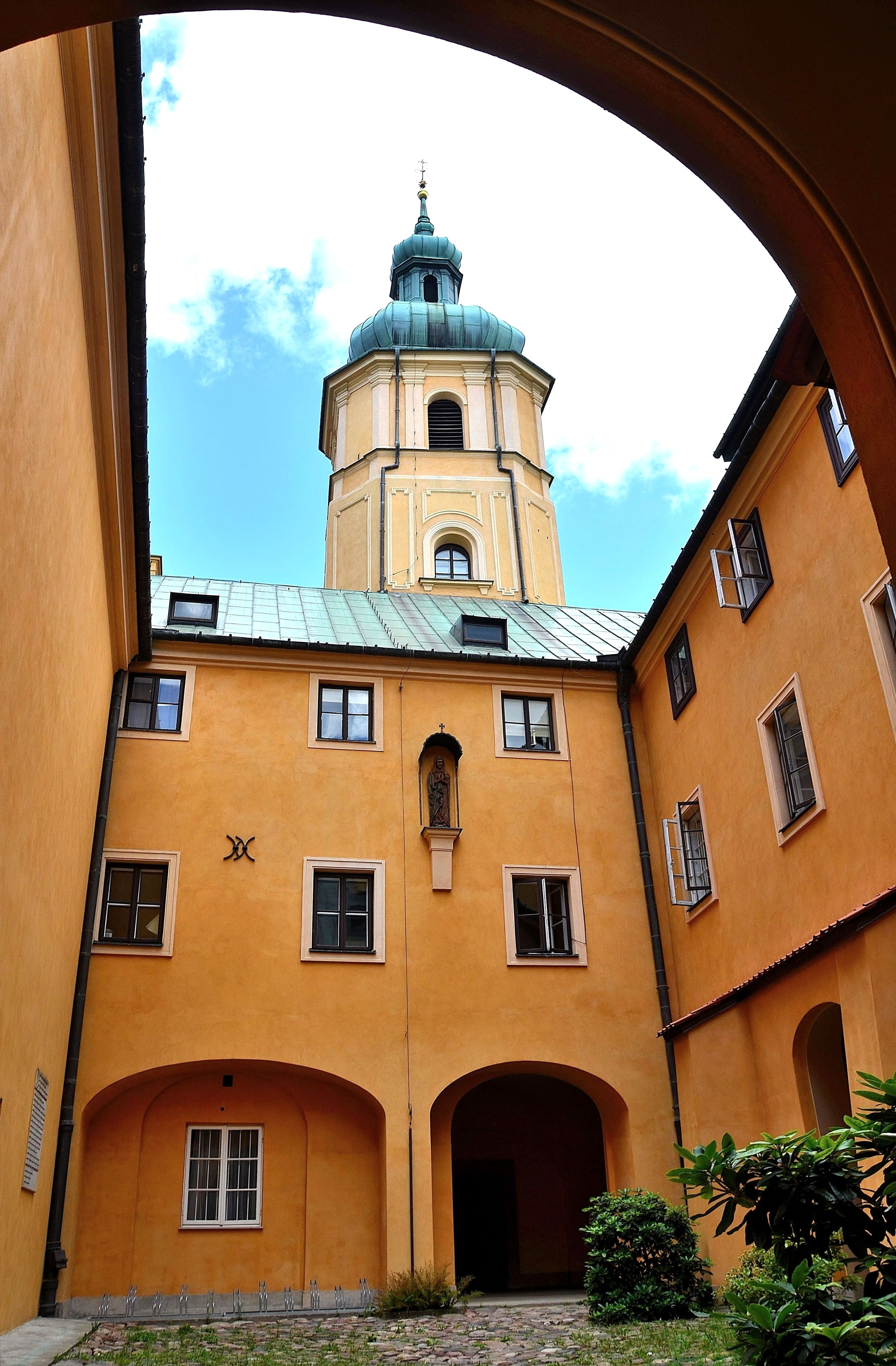
The monastery courtyard.

The church was reconstructed in about 1744 according to Karol Bay's design, and resembles the architecture of Bay's Church of Order of the Visitation. The main façade of waved lines represent so-called Melted Sugar style in rococo architecture. The central altar was also changed according to Karol Bay's design with sculptures by Jan Jerzy Plersch in 1751.

== Interior ==
The facade is baroque, although the interior is completely modern. The profuse early baroque furnishings, created in the 1630s by Jan Henel (sculptor of King Władysław IV Vasa) together with the rococo decorations done in the 1750s, were destroyed by German bombing during the Warsaw Uprising. The church was ruined. It was reconstructed after World War II. Inside the church, at the end of the right nave, there is a chapel of Our Lady of Consolation with a copy of a painting from the 15th century, and at the end of the left one - there is the chapel of Jesus Christ. Next to the sanctuary there is a chapel of St. Francis with the most valuable element of the church's furnishing - a polychromed figure of the Virgin Mary with the Child.

== See also ==
- Visitationist Church
