= Kazimierz Najmałowski =

Activist of several Protestant communities in Poland

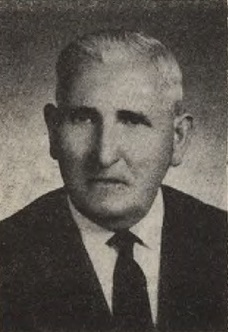
- Kazimierz Najmałowski
- Born: August 29, 1902; Slonim
- Died: July 9, 1978 (aged 75)
- Burial place: Doły Cemetery in Łódź
- Years active: 1935–1978
- Religion: Protestantism
- Church: a few Protestant churches
- Offices held: Pastor

Kazimierz Najmałowski (29 August 1902–9 July 1978) was a former member and activist of several Protestant communities in Poland. From 1975 to 1978, he served as the vice president of the United Evangelical Church. He was a covert agent of the Security Office and reported on Protestant clergy. He also published articles in the monthly magazine Chrześcijanin.

== Biography ==
Kazimierz Najmałowski was born on 29 August 1902 in Slonim. His father died the same year, his mother in 1917, and two of his brothers died during the war. In 1926, he became a Baptist. Four years later, he began studying at the Baptist seminary in Łódź, where he graduated in 1933. He took up a pastoral position at the Baptist church in Lyskov and was ordained as the pastor of that church on 15 May 1938. During World War II, he lived in Lida, where he served as a pastor.

In 1945, he became the pastor of the Baptist church in Łódź and simultaneously served as the district presbyter. On 1 November 1948, he was removed from his position as pastor because his activities were considered incompatible with the principles of the Baptist Church. This decision was made by the church congregation and approved by the National Council of the Church. Najmałowski did not comply with this decision and sought another solution. He won over some of the congregation members and, along with them, formed a separate group of believers. He explained that the internal divisions in the church were caused by modernist theology.

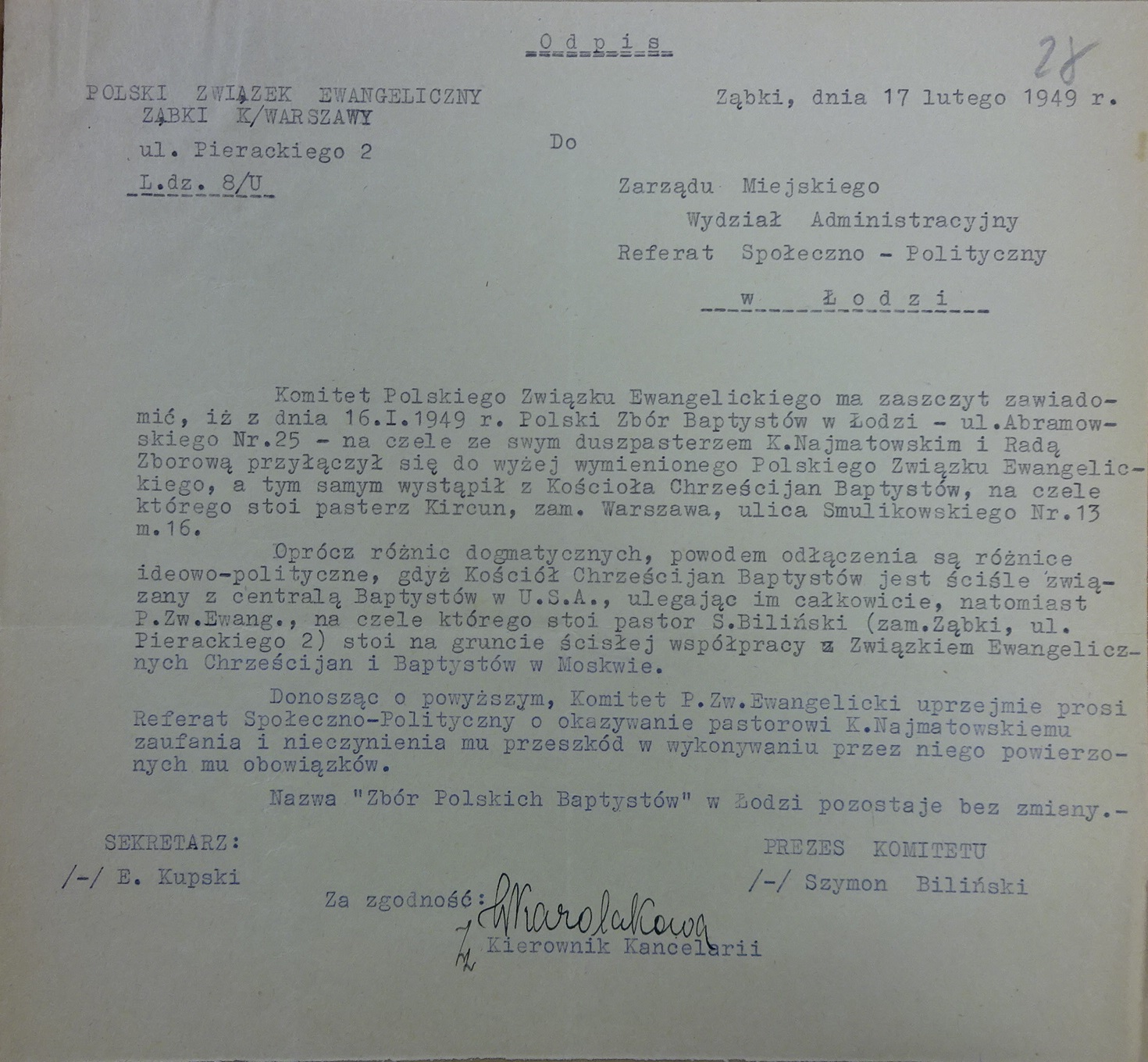
Letter from the Polish Evangelical Union to the Municipal Board in Łódź, dated 17 February 1949

In 1949, together with Szymon Biliński and Eugeniusz Kupski, he attempted to establish the Polish Evangelical Union. All three worked for the Security Office, and the church was intended to stand out by being modeled after the "Soviet" model. In 1950, he and his congregation joined the Methodist Church, and eight years later, they joined the United Evangelical Church.

In 1959, he was elected to the National Council of the Church, where he remained a member until 1978. At the seventh synod of the United Evangelical Church in 1971, he was elected to the Control Commission, and at the 1975 synod, he became the vice president of the church. He represented the evangelical Christian group.

In 1933, Kazimierz Najmałowski married Zofia Jeremiejczyk, with Aleksander Kircun officiating the ceremony. Together, they had four children, one of whom died during the war. Three children survived the war: Nelly, Angelina, and Kazimierz. Zofia died in 1952, and in 1959, Kazimierz remarried Edyta Sznydel, with Stanisław Krakiewicz officiating the second wedding.

Kazimierz Najmałowski died in a car accident on 9 July 1978.

== Collaboration with Polish People's Republic security authorities ==
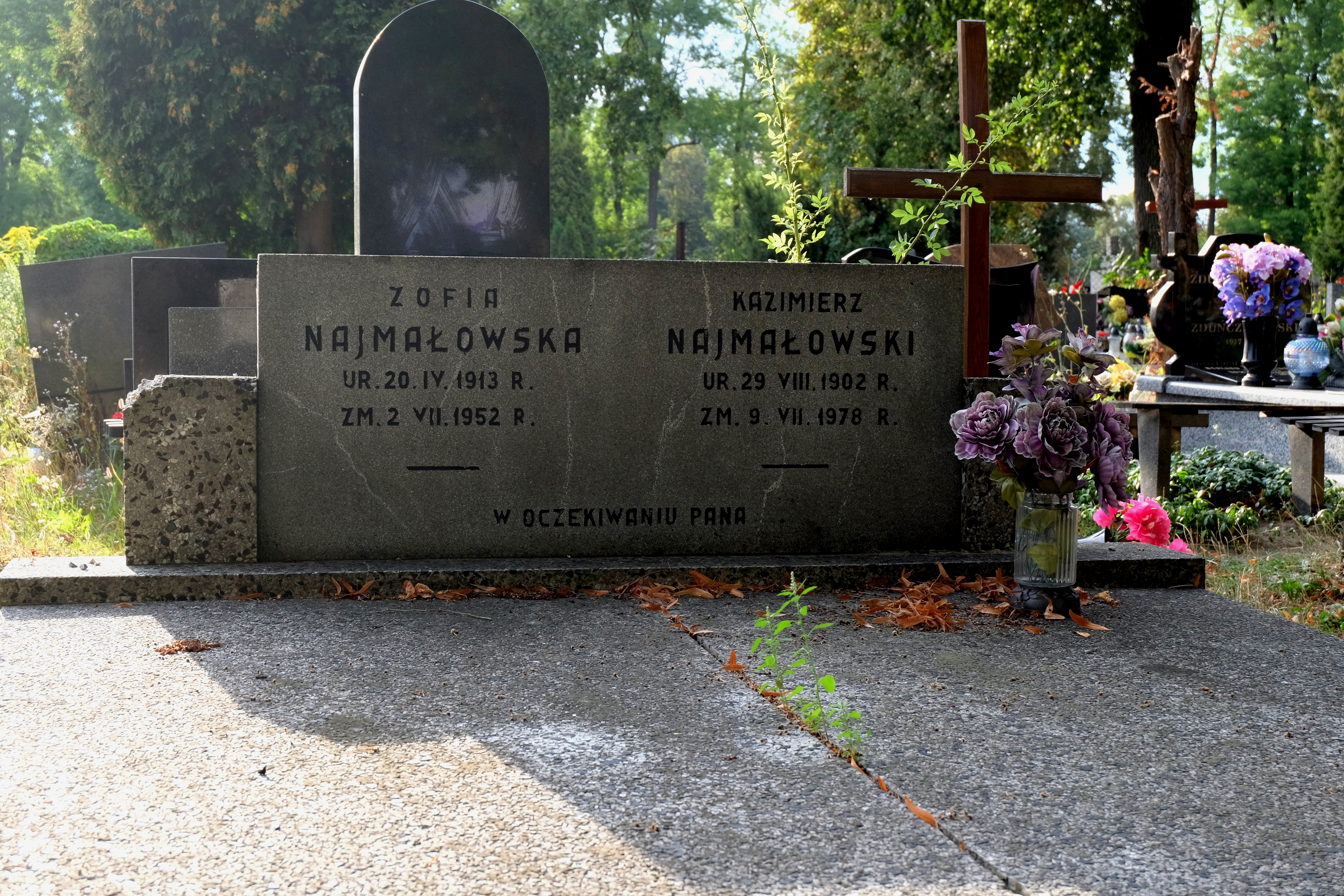
Grave of Kazimierz Najmałowski in the Baptist section of the Doły Cemetery in Łódź

Kazimierz Najmałowski was a covert agent with the Security Bureau of the Polish People's Republic. He was recruited on 10 October 1949, likely under duress, and was given the pseudonym "Posłaniec" ("The Messenger"). He informed primarily on Baptist activists, including Aleksander Kircun, Stanisław Toruń, Stefan Andres, and Abraham Gutkind, possibly motivated by personal vendettas. He also reported on Ludwik Szenderowski of the United Evangelical Church, accusing them of anti-socialist activities, though he failed to provide evidence, despite requests from his handler. Ryszard Michalak held "Posłaniec" and other informants partially responsible for the arrest of evangelical clergy in 1950. However, Henryk Ryszard Tomaszewski evaluated Najmałowski's reports as largely unimportant and often inaccurate, with many of his claims being readily available in church press, and some being false.

His cooperation with the authorities was short-lived. He became increasingly isolated from religious authorities, who did not trust him. A 1968 note from the Department for Religious Affairs in Łódź described him as disloyal, stating he did not accept the "current reality" and avoided contacts with the department, to the point of neglecting his duties under the association regulations.

== Views ==
In an article published in Chrześcijanin in 1961, he argued that a Christian "does not lie, does not slander, does not malign, does not accuse", and that those who make up and spread rumors grieve the Holy Spirit. He wrote:

Do not accuse anyone, and do not spread rumors, false or fabricated news, without verifying everything thoroughly. It is easy to defame, but it is impossible to restore a tarnished reputation. It is easy to rob someone of virtue and honor, but how hard it is to restore honor and a good name. Let us remember what we say, what we do, and whose side we are on: Christ's or Satan's?

== Assessments ==
During his time as a member of the Supreme Council of the United Evangelical Church, he was accused of representing evangelical Christians, but not being a "native" representative of this group.

Konstanty Kryszczuk posthumously assessed him: "In my memory, he will remain as a faithful and tireless servant of Jesus Christ, who knew the Bible very well. Therefore, we, the younger generation of workers, often used His guidance and teachings as an older, experienced worker in the Lord's vineyard".

== Publications ==
- Mężobójcy wśród ludu Bożego (Murderers Among the People of God). Chrześcijanin. No. 1, pp. 4–6, 1961.
- „Pan patrzy na serce...” ("The Lord Looks at the Heart..."). Chrześcijanin. No. 7-8, pp. 5–7, 1963.
- Prawda i kłamstwo (Truth and Lies). Chrześcijanin. No. 3, pp. 4–5, 1964.
- Nieznany (Unknown). Chrześcijanin. No. 6, pp. 2–3, 1964.
- Szkoła cierpliwości (The School of Patience). Chrześcijanin. No. 7–8, pp. 2–3, 1964.

== Awards ==
In 1974, the National Council of the city of Łódź awarded him the Honorary Badge of the City of Łódź.
