= Multiple identity =

Multiple identity may refer to:

- Multiple identity documents, typically used to commit fraud
- Multiple group identities, shared senses of belonging to groups
- Multiple social identities, sets of qualities, beliefs, personality traits, appearances, or expressions that characterize persons or groups
- Social identity complexity, a theoretical construct that refers to an individual's subjective representation of the interrelationships among their multiple group identities
- Plural identity, an identity used by those who report experiencing multiple distinct consciousnesses, identities, or self-states

== See also ==
- Double Identity (disambiguation)
- Dual identity (disambiguation)
- Multiple personality, a dissociative disorder
