= Operation B (Poland) =

Arrests of Evangelical clergymen in 1950

Operation B refers to the arrest of 199 Evangelical clergymen by the Ministry of Public Security in September 1950 in Poland. The objective of this operation was to weaken Evangelical Protestantism in Poland by eliminating churches that did not have a regulated legal status with the state. The arrested individuals belonged to three churches: the United Evangelical Church, the Church of Christians of Evangelical Faith, and the Union of Christ Churches. 87 clergymen were released a few days after their arrest, while others were released after several months. 16 were sentenced to prison. Some of them were included in the amnesty of 1952. These arrests influenced the expansion of the United Evangelical Church in 1953.

== Surveillance of churches ==
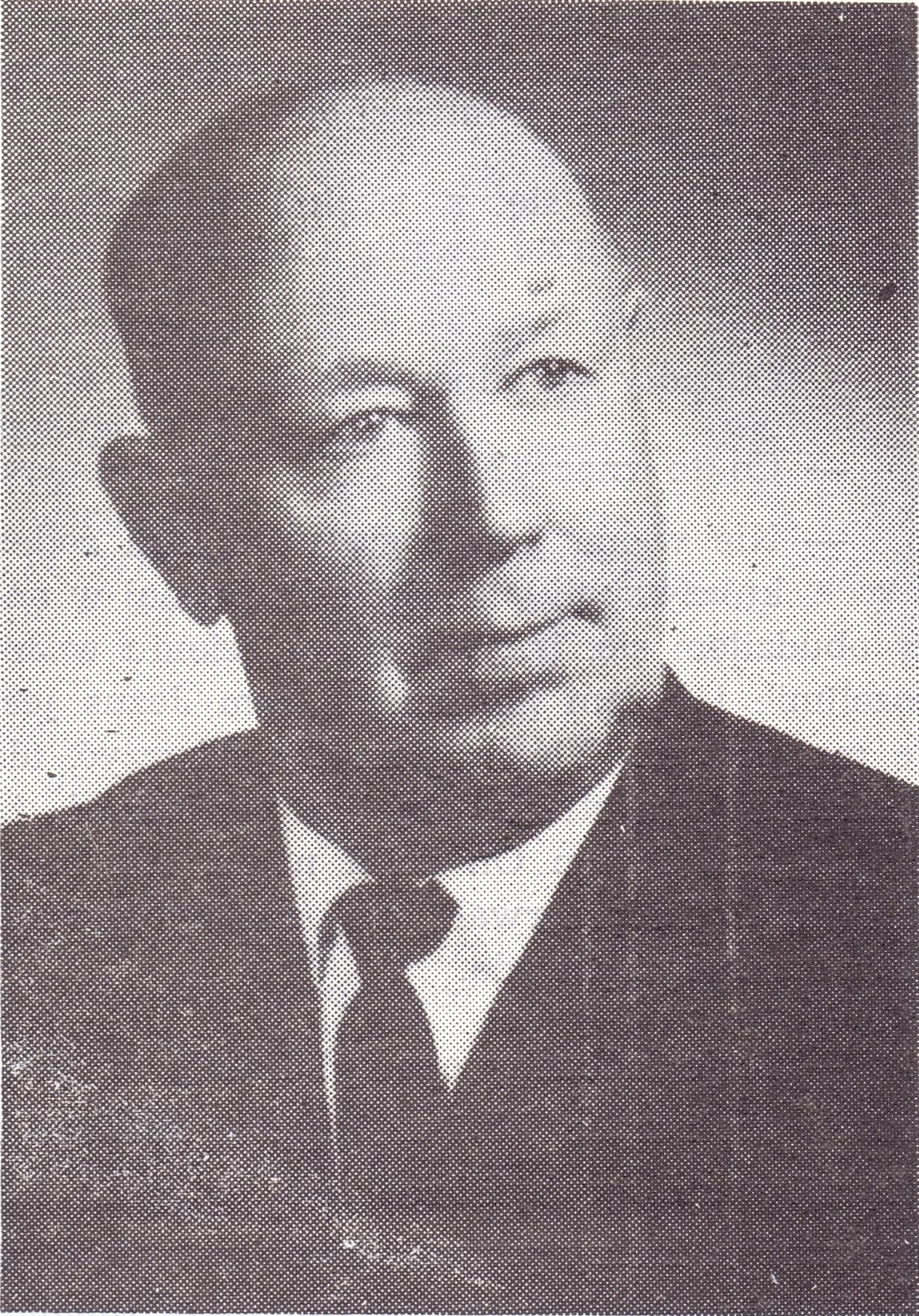
Teodor Maksymowicz

Between 1950 and 1953, the authorities conducted a series of actions targeting religious institutions, including the Catholic Church, Evangelical denominations accused of espionage and maintaining foreign contacts, as well as Jehovah's Witnesses.

In 1947, the Ministry of Public Security began gathering information on Evangelical church activists, excluding the Baptist Christian Church. One reason for the repressive actions was the foreign contacts maintained by the leaders of these churches and the reception of foreign aid. Although Baptists also had foreign contacts, they were a legalized group, and their foreign aid was more transparent, thus arousing less suspicion. (Note: According to Michalak (2014, p. 229), it cannot be ruled out that the Baptists avoided the fate of other evangelical communities due to – among other possible reasons – the protection of Stalinist Minister of Justice Henryk Świątkowski, who owed his release from the Auschwitz-Birkenau camp to Waldemar Gutsche.) As part of the surveillance, incoming and outgoing correspondence from Poland was monitored. Letters sent by co-religionists to the members of the governing bodies of the surveilled churches were also controlled.

In November 1946, the Ministry of Public Security started to investigate the leadership of the Union of Christ Churches, opening an agent case under the code name Fanatyk. In April 1947, they initiated a case against the activists of the Church of Christians of Evangelical Faith under the code name Opieka. Local security offices launched cases against Evangelical activists in various parts of the country.

Following a show trial in Bulgaria in 1949, where 15 pastors were convicted, the Fifth Department of the Ministry of Public Security decided to arrest leading activists of the Union of Christ Churches and the United Evangelical Church. They prepared a Plan for the Partial Liquidation of Sects, which proposed the arrest of 18 activists at 9:00 PM on March 16, the interrogation of 28 activists, and searches at all 44 individuals’ homes. This operation was intended to cover 10 voivodeships and the capital city of Warsaw. Although it was not carried out, systematic surveillance of the "sects" began immediately. On 28 May 1949, the Warsaw Public Security Office opened an agent case under the code name Inżynier on the leadership of the United Evangelical Church. On June 7, the Fifth Department of the Ministry of Public Security drafted an "information" report regarding the Union of Christ Churches and the United Evangelical Church. It concluded that these churches constitute a base of American imperialist influence and serve as a channel for American espionage. The "sects" were to be liquidated to narrow the base of US influence and the operations of foreign intelligence networks. From then on, the Fifth Department of the Ministry of Public Security prepared to carry out liquidation actions.

== Arrest and charges ==
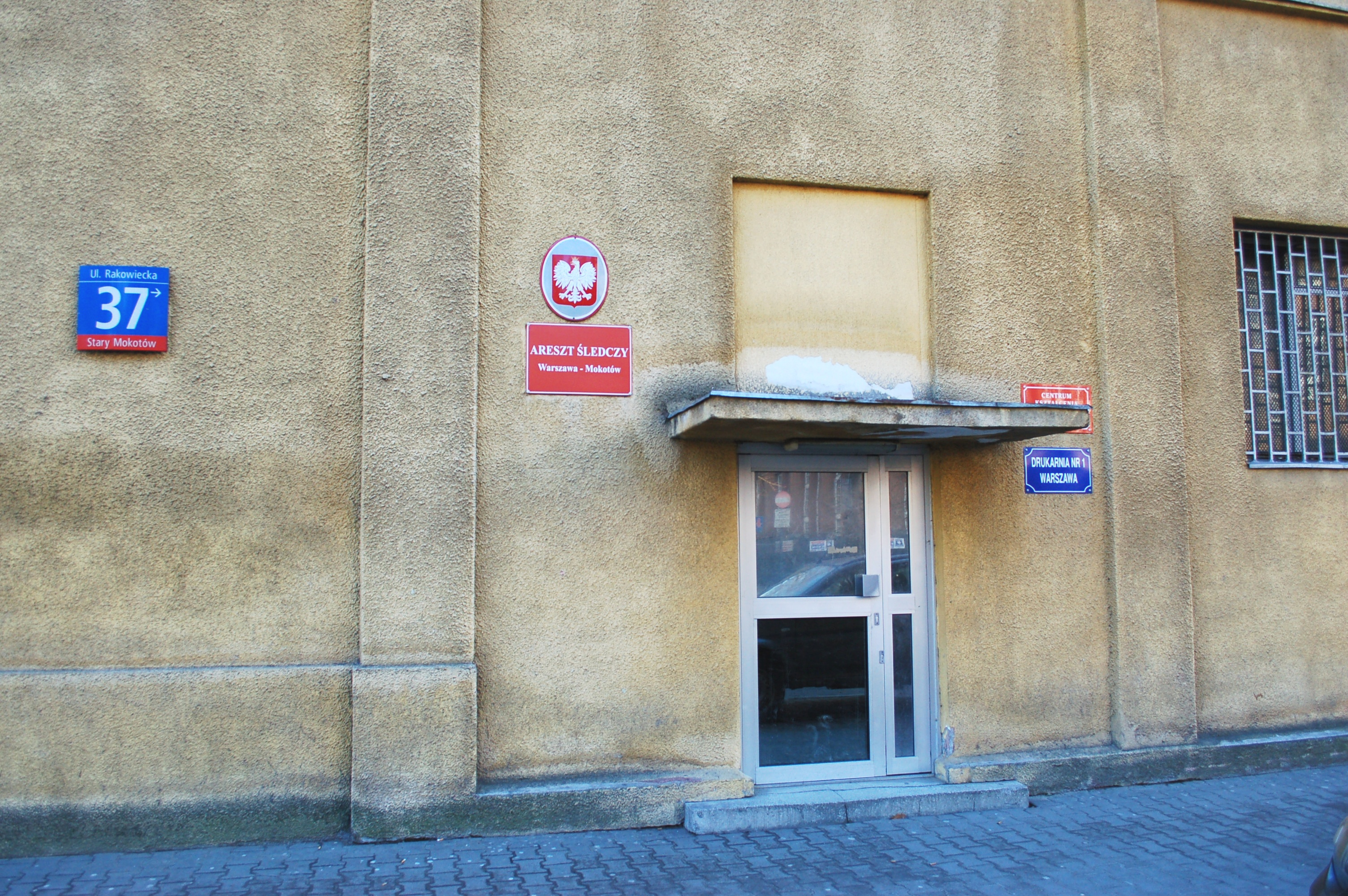
Some of the arrested individuals were sent to the investigative detention center in Mokotów

On the night between September 19 and 20, 1950, church leaders were arrested by the Ministry of Public Security, and all church properties were closed. A total of 199 individuals from Evangelical-Baptist type churches (namely, the United Evangelical Church, the Church of Christians of Evangelical Faith, and the Union of Christ Churches) were arrested, including not only clergy but also particularly active believers. (Note: Sławiński (2012, pp. 174–175) asserts that this number is most likely underestimated, as in Dorposz Chełmiński, 9 people were arrested and 18 were questioned from a congregation of 31 members. Even the postman, who delivered brochures sent to the pastor as part of his job, was arrested.) Additionally, around 200 people were detained for questioning, and approximately 600 searches were conducted. The highest number of arrests occurred in Katowice Voivodeship (41 individuals), and the most searches were conducted in Bydgoszcz Voivodeship (64 searches). Chapels, literature, hymnals, and church equipment were confiscated, most of which never returned to their owners. According to a memo prepared on October 2 for the Central Committee of the Polish United Workers' Party by a Public Security Office officer, over 200 paid operatives with espionage and White Guardist backgrounds, representing sects created in the interwar period by the Ministry of Internal Affairs, were arrested.

According to Leszek Jańczuk, the date of September 19 was chosen because on September 20, activists from the Church of Christians of Evangelical Faith were scheduled to discuss terms of joining the Methodist Church (the Methodists were legalized, whereas the Pentecostals were not).

The arrested individuals were presented with an extensive list of charges. The pre-war Ministry of Internal Affairs allegedly established these "sects" to conduct intelligence and subversive activities against the Soviet Union and national liberation movements. In the Eastern Borderlands, they were accused of agitation and propaganda for the Sanation regime and aiding in the Polonization of these lands. During the German occupation, these sects allegedly served the Gehlen Organization and conducted extensive anti-Soviet activities. In the post-war period, activists from these sects, described as spies of Anglo-American imperialism, were said to have established contacts with their command centers in the US and Sweden. Justifications for the arrests and charges were based on agent reports from Public Security Office's covert agents. Notably, informant Szymon Biliński (codenamed Żebrowski), who was expelled from the Union of Evangelical Christians in 1947, accused Ludwik Szenderowski and Jerzy Sacewicz, leaders of two Evangelical churches, of betraying the Gospel, engaging in anti-Soviet activities, and collaborating with Anglo-American intelligence. Reports from Eugeniusz Kupski (codenamed Eagle) and Kazimierz Najmałowski (codenamed Posłaniec) were also used. Characterizations of Evangelical activists from both 1949 and 1950 relied on reports from this trio. Other informants were rated poorly, accused of insincerity and reluctance to cooperate, and criticized for failing to report on the harmful activities of the sects despite having the means to do so.

87 of the arrested individuals were released before 1 October 1950. Some were released after a few months. By January 1951, 65 individuals remained in detention, half of whom were released in March. "Evidence" was being gathered against the most suspicious individuals, including Jerzy Sacewicz, Mikołaj Korniluk, Bolesław Winnik, Teodor Maksymowicz, Aleksander Rapanowicz, Franciszek Januszewicz, Józef Mrózek, and Sergiusz Waszkiewicz. Franciszek Więckiewicz was released in January 1951 due to his age and health condition. Clergy members were accused of conducting a broad anti-Soviet campaign, criticizing the people's government and production cooperatives. Władysław Kołodziej and Teodor Maksymowicz were identified as the most involved in these activities. On 6 October 1950, Jan Onacik prepared guidelines for conducting the investigation. It was necessary to obtain information about political cooperation with the Sanation regime, as well as cooperation with the Second Department of Polish General Staff, the German occupiers and foreign intelligence after World War II. These guidelines were sent to the provincial offices of public security.

== Trial and imprisonment ==
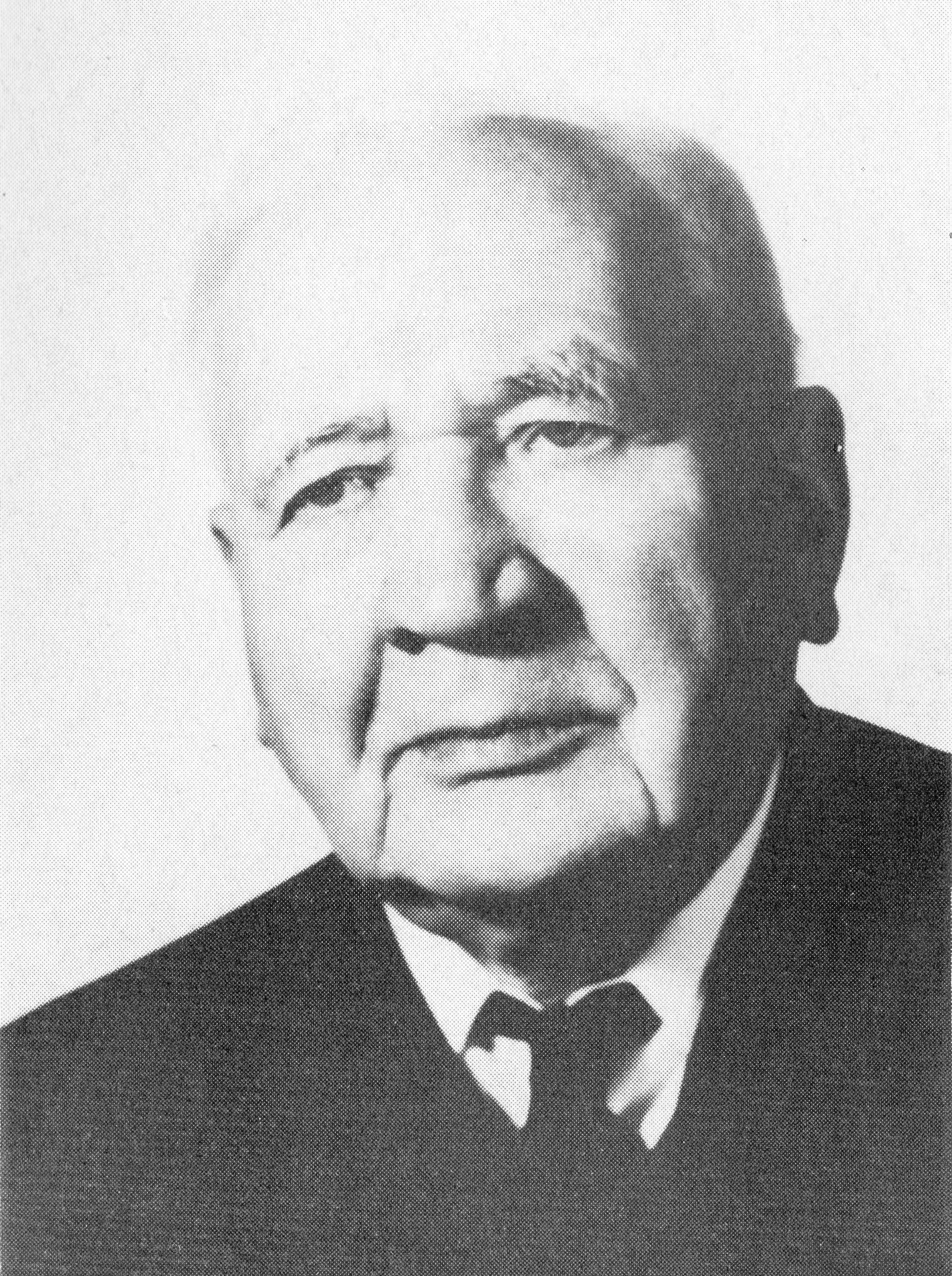
Stanisław Krakiewicz

The Office of Public Security modeled their actions on the 1949 Bulgarian trial and intended to prepare a show trial. However, despite the use of torture and intimidation in prisons, the clergy did not confess to the charges against them. The investigation was conducted incompetently, and in a report dated 7 July 1951, Colonel Józef Różański informed General Roman Romkowski that not a single fundamental issue was clarified with the suspects. Consequently, the idea of a show trial was abandoned.

According to Ryszard Michalak, everyone signed a declaration stating they had no grievances against the Office of Public Security before being released from detention. 16 individuals were sentenced to prison. Paweł Lindner and Henryk Jarząbski were sentenced to several months in prison (9 and 6 months, respectively) for possessing the brochure What Awaits Us?, published in 1930. Stanisław Krakiewicz was detained on charges of conducting intelligence work and sentenced for anti-state activities. Ludwik Szenderowski was sentenced to 9 years in prison based on Szymon Biliński's reports and extensive contacts with co-religionists in the United States, especially Piotr Deyneka. Maksymowicz was sentenced to two years in a labor camp. Sacewicz was accused of dollar trading and sentenced to 2 years in a labor camp on 21 February 1952. On 12 March 1952, Korniluk was sentenced to 4 years in prison, and Winnik to 5 years. Sergiusz Waszkiewicz was sentenced to 18 months in prison, Kazimiera Nawrocka to 15 months, Stefan Osadca to 18 months, Józef Mrózek (junior) to 2 years in a labor camp on espionage charges, and Paweł Bakałarz (a Lutheran) to 11 months for trading foreign currency on the black market.

After the 1952 parliamentary elections, the authorities decided to release some of the convicted individuals under the third amnesty law. Kołodziej served his full sentence and was released in September 1953. Szenderowski was the last to be released, on 4 April 1955.

== Outcome ==
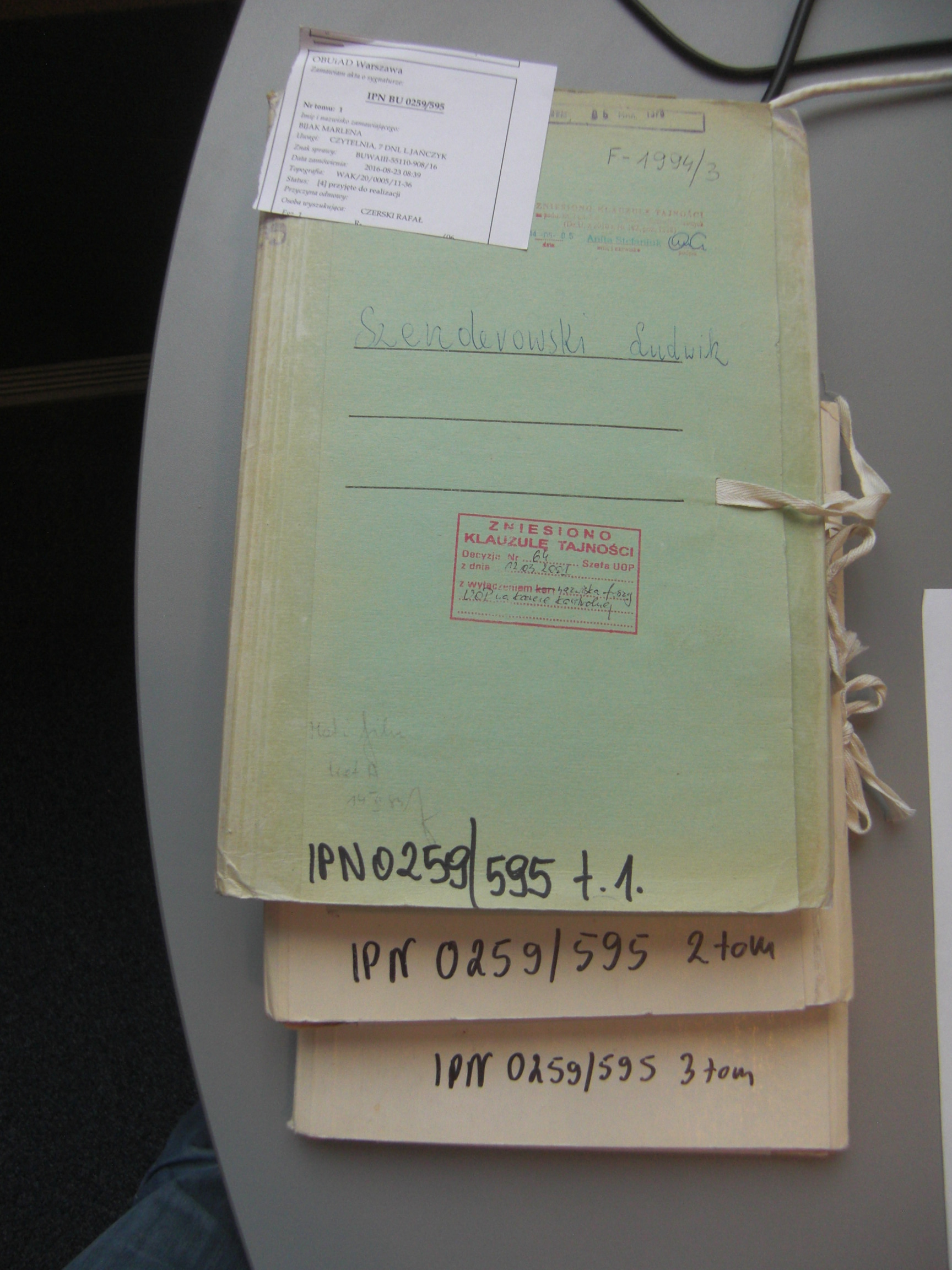
Materials collected by the Security Services on Ludwik Szenderowski

The scale of this operation surpassed the repressions against other Christian churches. For comparison, throughout 1950, the Ministry of Public Security arrested 132 Catholic priests. The only religious group more persecuted at the time were the Jehovah's Witnesses. As a result of these repressions, the growth of Evangelical denominations was hindered, and even those groups whose clergy were not arrested were intimidated.

The Union of Christ’s Churches suffered the most from the arrests. In January 1950, this church had 43 congregations, but by March 1952, it had only 24. Some members transferred to churches that were not affected by the arrests. For example, the Christ Church in Orla ceased to exist as its members joined the Baptists. In Szczecin, during the imprisonment of Aleksander Rapanowicz, the faithful attended the Methodist Church and returned to their congregation after Rapanowicz’s release. Wacław Kołodziej, the editor-in-chief of Jedność from 1948 to 1950, joined the Methodists after his release in 1953.

The authorities assumed that the arrests would weaken or even lead to the liquidation of the religious communities affected by the repressions. However, these communities did not cease their activities, partly due to the principle of "universal priesthood", meaning the laity took over church responsibilities. The security services made incorrect assessments regarding the impact of the arrests. For example, in the Białystok Voivodeship, it was assessed that the arrests changed nothing, yet many believers transferred to other churches, and fewer people were baptized. According to Jan Mironczuk, who studies the history of Polish Evangelicalism in the 20th century, the arrests halted the functioning of the churches for several months, and it was not until the spring of 1951 that religious life began to return to the repressed "sects". Ultimately, the authorities allowed the existence of Evangelical churches affected by the arrests but decided to control them. The Office for Religious Affairs decided in July 1952 to permit these churches to function, provided they merged into one church.

Some of the arrested, including Sacewicz and Korniluk, met with Catholic clergy (Zygmunt Kaczyński, Kajetan Raczyński, Beniamin Piotr Domaradzki) in their cells. The imprisonment brought them closer ecumenically. It also brought Evangelical churches closer together (Teodor Lewczuk from the Union of Christ’s Churches assured Jakub Kozak from the Church of Christians of Evangelical Faith, Now, when we get out, we will be together).

Krakiewicz, influenced by his experiences in prison (from 1950 to 1952), adopted a loyalist position towards the communist authorities and became a guarantor of the proper political course of the church from the authorities' point of view. The religious authorities obliged some of those released from the Church of Christians of Evangelical Faith and Union of Christ’s Churches to work towards expanding the United Evangelical Church. Paweł Bajeński underwent a similar transformation as Krakiewicz. During Jerzy Sacewicz's imprisonment (an opponent of joining the United Evangelical Church), he managed to bring the Union of Christ’s Churches into the structures of the United Evangelical Church. Similarly, Józef Czerski, a longtime president of the Church of Christians of Evangelical Faith, who was against joining the United Evangelical Church before the arrests, encouraged the Church of Christians of Evangelical Faith congregations to join the United Evangelical Church after his release. In 1952 and 1953, two Coordinating Conferences were held with the aim of expanding the United Evangelical Church.

Under the influence of the arrests, the Christian Pentecostal Fellowship distanced itself from the Evangelical Christians and transformed into a separate denomination.

As a result of the security services' actions, a certain number of informants were recruited. However, the information they provided later had little operational value. This network of informants was almost entirely deregistered by the end of 1956. The Ministry of Public Security never admitted that the arrests were a mistake.

== Memory of the event and its impact on subsequent generations ==
During the Polish People's Republic, the arrests were known almost exclusively within the United Evangelical Church community, with knowledge about them passed on orally. Publications from that era referred to them as a time of trial, citing external causes, independent causes, and painful experiences. It was not until 1982 that the word arrests was used for the first time in this context, in a publication by Mieczysław Kwiecień. Outside the Evangelical community, the action was little known. Within the Evangelical community, the memory of the event was constantly maintained and cultivated. After the fall of communism, these events were used to build a narrative of martyrdom, arguing that the Evangelical community was persecuted during the rule of the Polish United Workers' Party. In the Pentecostal community, it became a widespread belief that the Christian Pentecostal Fellowship joined the United Evangelical Church as a result of these arrests.

After 2005, this event was referenced in discussions about lustration. Tomasz Terlikowski, writing for Newsweek, used it as an argument that the United Evangelical Church was monitored by the security services, as the arrested were offered cooperation. On 27 March 2007, the Senate of the Christian Theological Academy, opposing the lustration law of 18 October 2006 and the ideologization of social life, referenced the persecution of minority churches during the Polish People's Republic era. This included the imprisonment and death of Bishop Józef Padewski of the Polish National Catholic Church, the arrest of Metropolitan Dionysius, head of the Polish Orthodox Church, and the arrest of 199 clergymen of the United Evangelical Church, the Church of Christ, and the Church of Christians of the Evangelical Faith.

== Bibliography ==
- Jańczuk, Leszek (2017). "Aresztowanie ewangelikalnych duchownych w województwie białostockim we wrześniu 1950 roku" (PDF). Rocznik Teologiczny (in Polish). I (LIX). ISSN 0239-2550.
- Jańczuk, Leszek (2021). "Aresztowanie 199 ewangelikalnych duchownych we wrześniu 1950 roku". Gdański Rocznik Ewangelicki (in Polish). XV.
- Jańczuk, Leszek (2020). "Plan operacyjny częściowej likwidacji tzw. sekt w Polsce w 1949 roku". Rocznik Teologiczny (in Polish). I (LXII). ISSN 0239-2550.
- Kamiński, Marek (2012). Kościół Zielonoświątkowy w Polsce w latach 1988–2008: Studium historyczno-ustrojowe (in Polish). Warsaw: Warszawskie Seminarium Teologiczne. ISBN 978-83-905704-8-8.
- Michalak, Ryszard (2004). "Dziel i rządź". Biuletyn Instytutu Pamięci Narodowej (in Polish). 3 (38).
- Michalak, Ryszard (2014). Polityka wyznaniowa państwa polskiego wobec mniejszości religijnych w latach 1945–1989 (in Polish). Zielona Góra: Uniwersytet Zielonogórski. ISBN 978-83-7842-124-5.
- Mironczuk, Jan (2006). Polityka państwa wobec Zjednoczonego Kościoła Ewangelicznego w Polsce (1947-1989) (in Polish). Warsaw: Wydawnictwo Naukowe Semper. ISBN 83-89100-95-9.
- Mironczuk, Jan (2015). Ruch ewangeliczny na Białostocczyźnie w XX wieku (in Polish). Warsaw: Wydawnictwo Naukowe Semper. ISBN 978-83-7507-181-8.
- Sławiński, Wojciech (2012). "Cele, taktyka i działania wobec chrześcijańskich mniejszości wyznaniowych w latach 1945-1956 w Polsce". In Kłaczkow, Jarosław; Rozynkowski, W. (eds.). Kościoły chrześcijańskie w systemach totalitarnych (in Polish). Toruń: Adam Marszałek.
- Tomaszewski, Henryk Ryszard (2009). Zjednoczony Kościół Ewangeliczny 1947-1987 (in Polish). Warsaw: KOMPAS II. ISBN 978-83-925744-5-3.
- Weremiejewicz, Mirosława (2014). Kościół Chrystusowy w Polsce w latach 1921–2006 (in Polish). Toruń: Duet. ISBN 978-83-62558-81-0.
