= Secret identity (disambiguation) =

A secret identity is a person's alter ego which is not known to the general populace, most often used in fiction.

Secret identity may also refer to:

- Secret Identity, a 2006 novel based on the TV series Lost
- My Secret Identity, a 1980s TV series
- Superman: Secret Identity, a 2004 TV miniseries
- "Secret Identity", a song by The Jealous Girlfriends from the 2007 album The Jealous Girlfriends
- Secret Identities: The Asian American Superhero Anthology, a comics anthology
- Secret Identity, a CSI: Crime Scene Investigation comic

== See also ==
- Dual identity (disambiguation)
- Double Identity (disambiguation)
- Alter ego (disambiguation)
- Covert agent
- Cover (intelligence gathering)
- Front organization
- Pseudonym
