= Alter Ego =

An alter ego is an alternate personality or persona.

Alter Ego(s) may also refer to:

== Arts and entertainment ==
=== Comics ===
- Alter Ego (magazine), a 1960s comics fanzine, revived as a 1990s professional magazine
- Alter Ego, a 1986 First Comics miniseries reviving a variety of Golden Age superheroes
- Alter Ego, a Spanish yuri romance comic.

=== Film and television ===
- Alter Ego (2007 film), a Greek film starring singer Sakis Rouvas
- Alter Ego (2017 film), a Nigerian film directed by Moses Inwang
- Alter Ego (TV series), a 2021 game show
- "Alter Ego" (Star Trek: Voyager), a 1997 television episode
- Alter Egos, a 2012 American film by Jordan Galland

=== Music ===
==== Bands ====
- Alter Ego (band), a German house music duo

==== Albums ====
- Alter Ego (Amanda Lear album) or the title song, 1995
- Alter Ego (Tyrese album) or the title song, 2006
- Alter Ego (Prince Royce album), 2020
- Alter Ego (Lisa album), 2025
- Alter Ego (soundtrack), from the 2007 film
- Alter Ego, 1990 album by Harry Sacksioni, or the title song* Alter Ego, by Egotrippi, 1998
- Alter Ego, by Lady Saw, 2014
- Alter Egos, an EP by Ingrid Michaelson, 2017

==== Songs ====
- "Alter Ego", by Tame Impala from InnerSpeaker, 2010
- "Alter Ego", a 2016 song by Minus One, Cyprus' entry in the Eurovision Song Contest
- "Alter Ego" (Doechii and JT song), a 2024 song

=== Video games ===
- Alter Ego (1986 video game), a personality computer game released by Activision
- Alter Ego (2010 video game), an adventure computer game developed by Future Games
- Alter Ego, a character in the 2010 Danganronpa: Trigger Happy Havoc

== Other uses ==
- Alter/Ego, a real-time vocal synthesizer software by Plogue
- AlterEgo, a wearable silent speech output-input device developed by MIT Media Lab
- "Alter ego", a legal concept related to piercing the corporate veil

== See also ==
- Altar Ego, a 2011 album by AKA
- Altar Egos (disambiguation)
- Secret identity (disambiguation)
