= Teodor Maksymowicz =

Polish pastor and leader of the United Evangelical Church

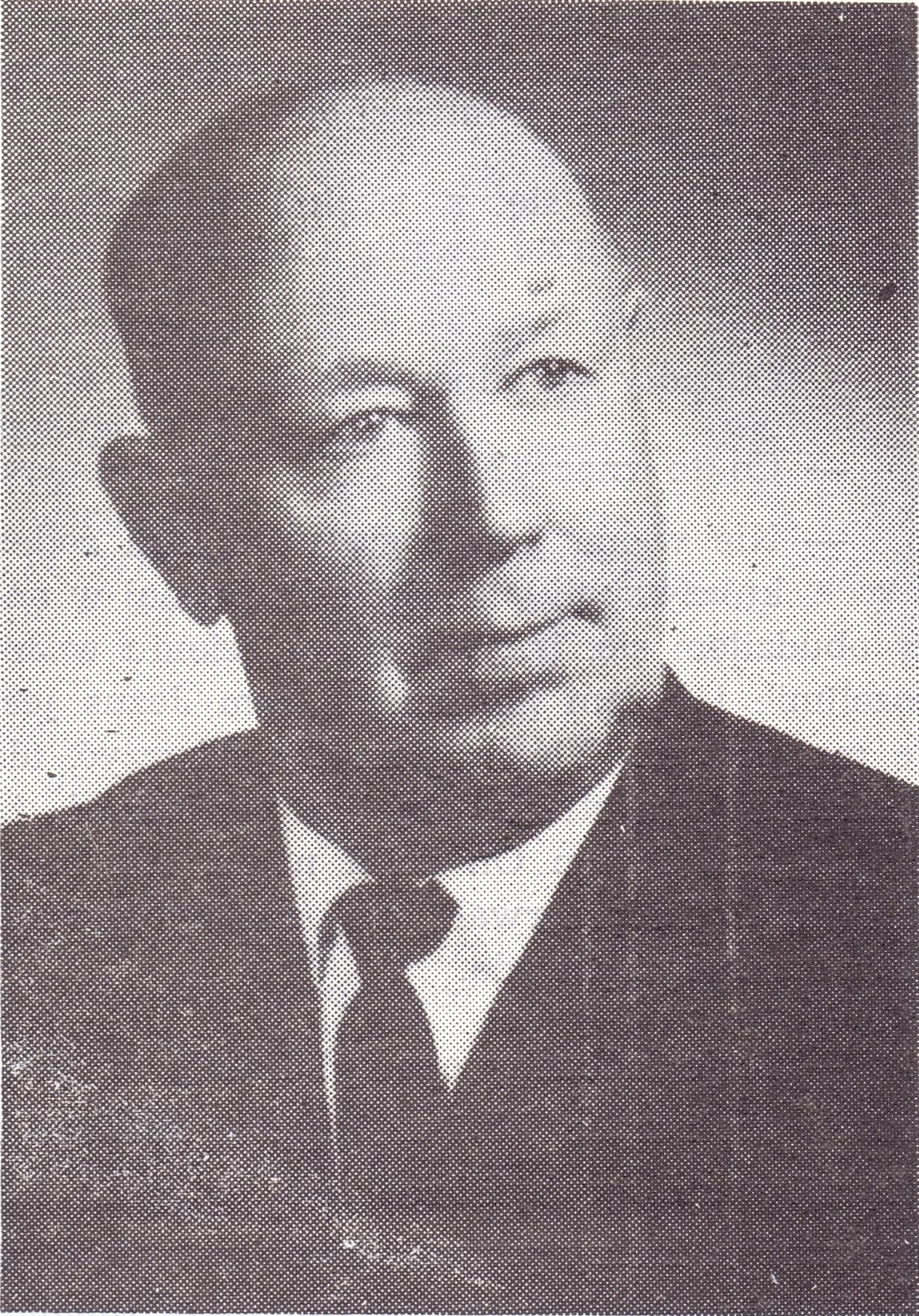
- Maksymowicz in 1972
- Born: July 22, 1902; Choromsk
- Died: September 22, 1983 (aged 81)
- Burial place: Evangelical Reformed Cemetery, Warsaw

Ecclesiastical career
- Religion: Pentecostalism
- Church: Christian Evangelical Faith Union; United Evangelical Church

Teodor Maksymowicz (22 July 1902 – 22 September 1983) was a Polish Pentecostal pastor and a prominent leader of the Christian Evangelical Faith Union (from 1946 known as the Church of Christians of Evangelical Faith) and later the United Evangelical Church. He advocated for cooperation with related evangelical groups and held significant roles in both churches for many years. Maksymowicz made substantial contributions to the evangelical community in post-war Poland, though his final years were marked by conflict.

== Biography ==
Teodor Maksymowicz was born on 22 July 1902 in Choromsk, in the Polesia region, to a peasant family. He was baptised by immersion in 1928 and experienced the baptism with the Holy Spirit on 13 February 1929. That same year, he was ordained as a deacon and appointed leader of the Christian Evangelical Faith congregation in Stolin County. From 1930 to 1931, he studied at a Bible school in Gdańsk. In 1936, he became a presbyter and was elected treasurer of the district during a regional meeting in Pinsk. During the German occupation, he was restricted to working in one county and took a job as the chairman of a dairy cooperative to support his family.

Following the post-World War II border changes, Maksymowicz found himself in the Soviet Union. In 1944, he was repatriated to Poland. He initially settled in Skierniewice before moving to Kętrzyn, where he established a congregation. In Kętrzyn, he worked briefly at a land registry office. In 1960, he relocated to Brwinów, near Warsaw. Maksymowicz died on 22 September 1983. He was buried at the Evangelical Reformed Cemetery in Warsaw (plot 7-4-5).

In 1970, his son Izaak died at the age of 31.

== Clerical career ==
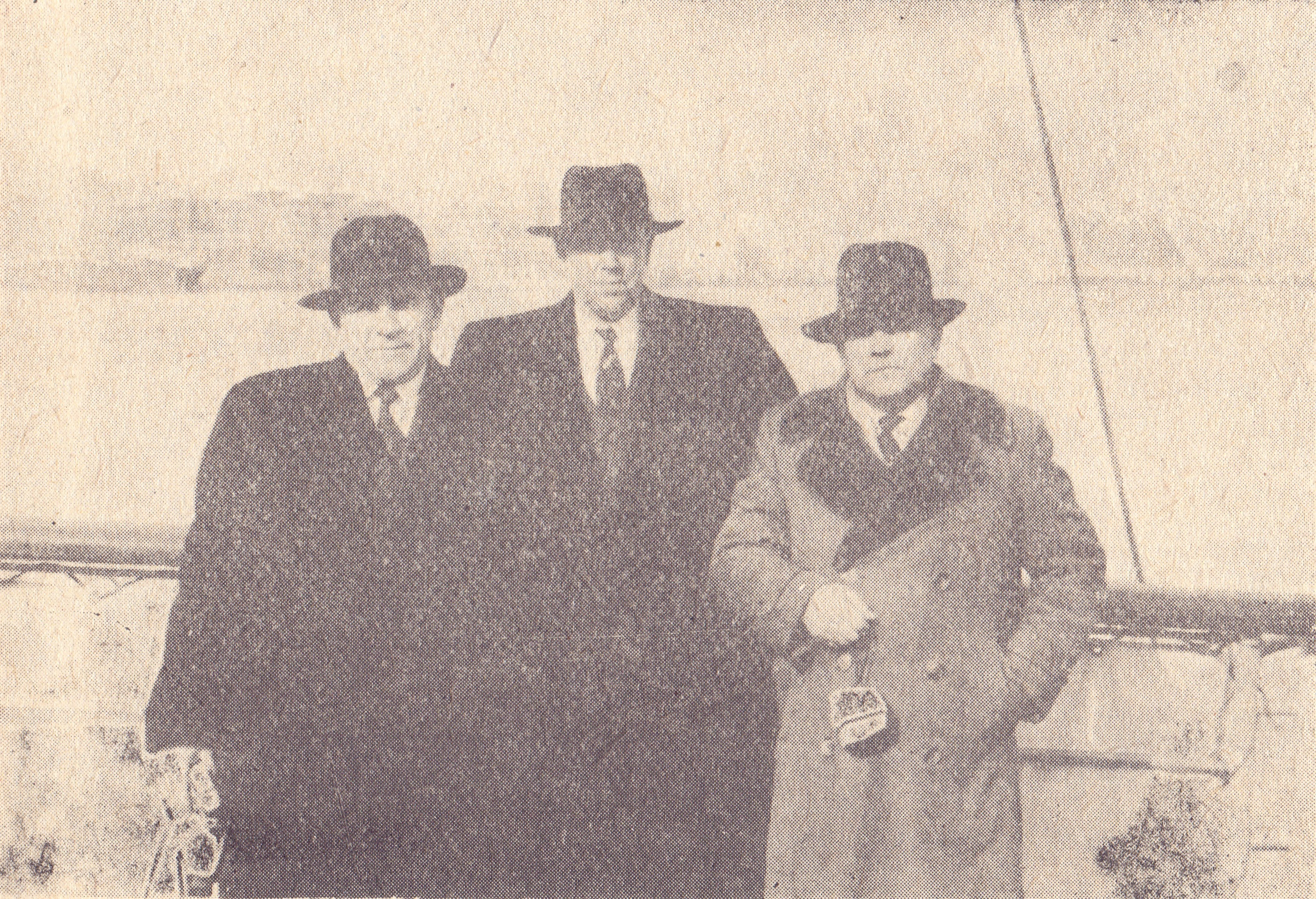
Trip to Canada in 1958 aboard the SS Atlantic; from left: Paweł Bajeński, Teodor Maksymowicz, Sergiusz Waszkiewicz

In 1945, Maksymowicz founded a congregation in Kętrzyn, serving as its first pastor. He worked to unite Pentecostals across northern Poland, from the Białystok Land to Western Pomerania. In 1946, at a conference in Łódź, he was elected vice-president of the Church of Christians of Evangelical Faith. On 24–26 May 1947, he attended the "Fraternal Conference" in Ustroń as an observer. The Church of Christians of Evangelical Faith declined to participate. This conference led to the formation of the United Evangelical Church. Maksymowicz advocated for the Church of Christians of Evangelical Faith to join the United Evangelical Church, supported by Sergiusz Waszkiewicz and Aleksander Rapanowicz, but opposed by Józef Czerski, Franciszek Januszewicz, and Walenty Dawidow.

In 1946, he established contact with the Eastern European Mission in the United States and a Swedish charitable mission. Due to these international ties, on 16 June 1948, the Olsztyn Voivodeship Office of Public Security initiated an investigation under the codename "Chytry", suspecting him of espionage. The investigation was poorly conducted, and the Department V of the Ministry of Public Security in Warsaw criticized the Olsztyn office for inefficiency and recommended better informants.

Maksymowicz was arrested on 21 September 1950 in Warsaw near Saviour Square, close to a Methodist church. Interrogations began the same day. On 2 October 1950, Department V of the Ministry of Public Security issued a note to the Central Committee of the Polish United Workers' Party justifying the arrests, accusing Maksymowicz and Władysław Kołodziej of being particularly active enemies of the people's government. He was charged with conducting an anti-Soviet campaign, criticizing the government, opposing production cooperatives, forging documents for Soviet escapees, and sheltering German agents. A 25 April 1951 report to the Chief of Section VII of the Main Information Directorate of the Ministry of National Defence stated that the investigation found no evidence of espionage, and a search yielded no results. Other individuals arrested during Operation B were questioned about Maksymowicz, with Stanisław Krakiewicz providing the most incriminating testimony, alleging anti-Soviet activities.

Maksymowicz was sentenced to two years in a labour camp. Under the amnesty of 20 November 1952, his sentence was halved. After his release, he faced distrust and accusations of improper conduct and possessing banned pamphlets. He was imprisoned for a total of two years and seven months. After his release, authorities continued to distrust him, accusing him of disruptive behaviour during elections to the National Councils and associating with local "kulaks", according to Security Service notes from between 1955 and 1956.

After his release, Maksymowicz remained a regional presbyter in the Olsztyn Voivodeship. When the Christian Evangelical Faith Union joined the United Evangelical Church, he retained this role and, after Jakub Sielużycki's departure to Sweden, was assigned oversight of congregations in the Białystok Voivodeship. He opposed the 1956 schism in the United Evangelical Church and declined the presidency of the re-established Church of Christians of Evangelical Faith, deeming the reasons for leaving the United Evangelical Church insufficient. He worked to reconcile schismatics with the United Evangelical Church.

In 1956, he became the treasurer of the United Evangelical Church. He oversaw the Home for the Elderly in Ostróda, opened in 1958. He served as a regional presbyter in the Białystok Voivodeship until February 1978, with his final year (January 1977–February 1978) marked by conflict. After losing his position, he continued to influence Białystok congregations and criticized his successor, Władysław Rudkowski.

In 1975, after the removal of United Evangelical Church president Stanisław Krakiewicz, Maksymowicz became vice-president. On 27 September 1975, at a Church Council Presidium meeting, he stated: "All previous regional presbyters were removed, but an official announcement should have been made, as some continue to engage in harmful activities". Historian Jan Mironczuk interprets this as evidence of the United Evangelical Church's attempt at self-purification in 1975.

== International travels ==
Maksymowicz travelled extensively. He visited Belarus in 1956, 1966, 1968, and 1969 to see family, and Ukraine in 1970, with further trips to the Soviet Union in 1973, 1974, 1976, and 1979. He visited Moscow several times, including for a national conference of the All-Union Council of Evangelical Christians-Baptists in 1974. Among socialist countries, he also visited Czechoslovakia. Maksymowicz smuggled religious literature into the Soviet Union, leading to a ban on travel to socialist countries on 28 January 1980.

In 1958, he attended the fifth global Pentecostal conference in Toronto as a church delegate, followed by a three-month tour of Canadian congregations. His second Western trip was to raise funds for a worship building on Zagórna Street in Warsaw. In San Francisco, one congregation donated 942 dollars during a single collection. This year-long trip included the United Kingdom, the United States, and Canada, visiting Baptist, Methodist, Mennonite, and Pentecostal congregations. He visited the US three times and travelled to Sweden to fund the construction of a chapel in Hajnówka. In 1968, he attended a Pentecostal conference in London and visited West Germany, Monaco (related to a radio station in Monte Carlo), and Switzerland (for leisure).

His frequent travels, both East and West, raised suspicions among fellow believers, who speculated he was collaborating with the Security Service. He valued Eastern spirituality, particularly the prayer practices in Soviet congregations, but criticized Soviet Baptists for being overly confessional, intolerant, and elitist compared to other evangelical groups, likening their behaviour to Polish Catholics.

== Final years ==
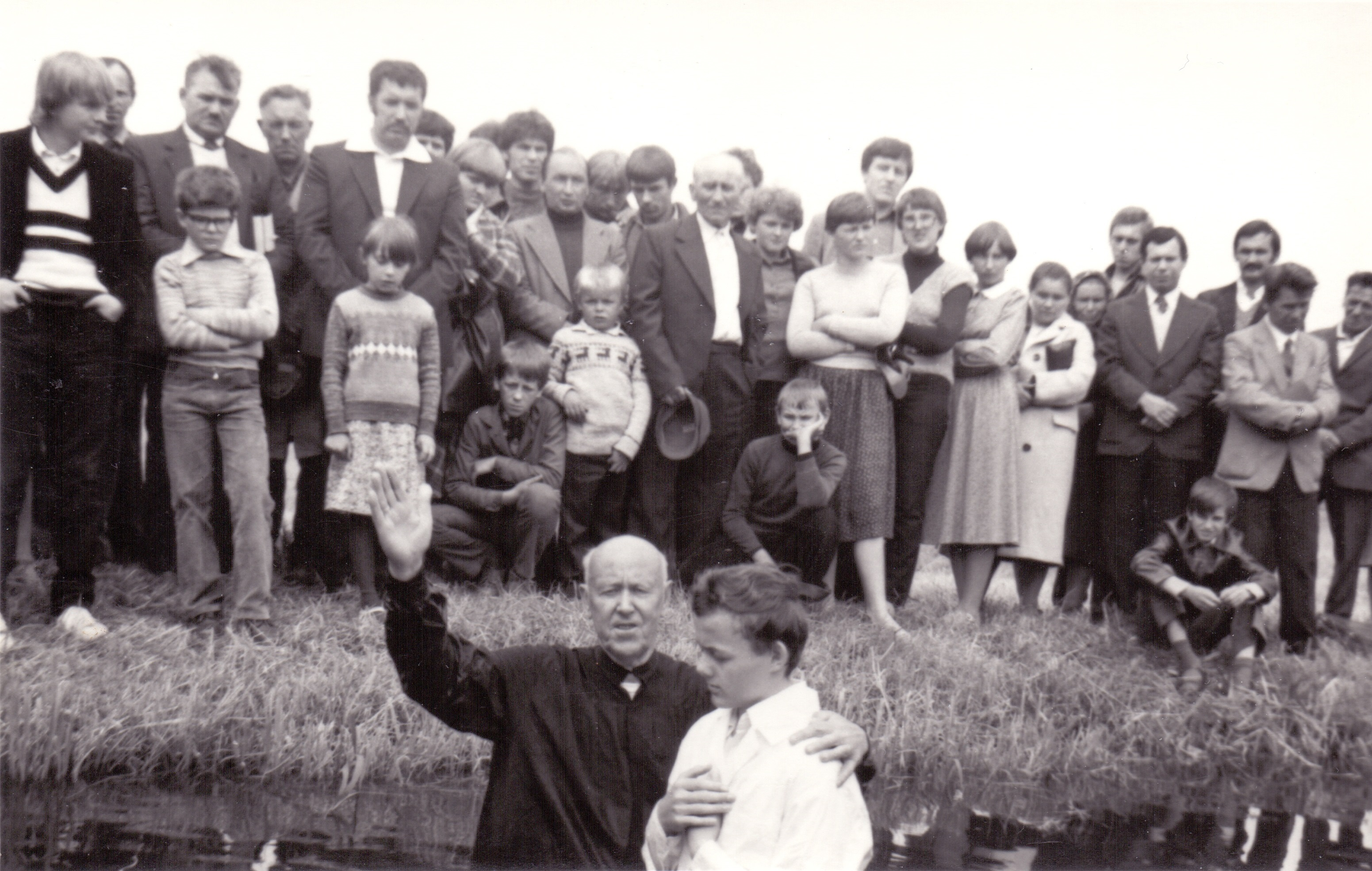
Baptism in Dubicze Cerkiewne (1982)

In 1978, Maksymowicz lost his position in the Church Council and struggled to accept this. In July 1980, alongside Aleksander Mańkowski, he attempted to revoke the authority of vice-president Mieczysław Suski, accusing him of "serious abuse of power" and harmful influence on congregations. He collected signatures and demanded that Konstanty Sacewicz deliver a letter to the Office for Religious Affairs. Sacewicz refused, citing the United Evangelical Church Statute, which stated that only the Church Synod could revoke such authority. Maksymowicz and Mańkowski then submitted the letter themselves to the Office for Religious Affairs but failed to remove Suski.

Maksymowicz died on 22 September 1983. His funeral took place in Warsaw on 26 September 1983, and he was buried at the Evangelical Reformed Cemetery.

== Publishing and journalism ==
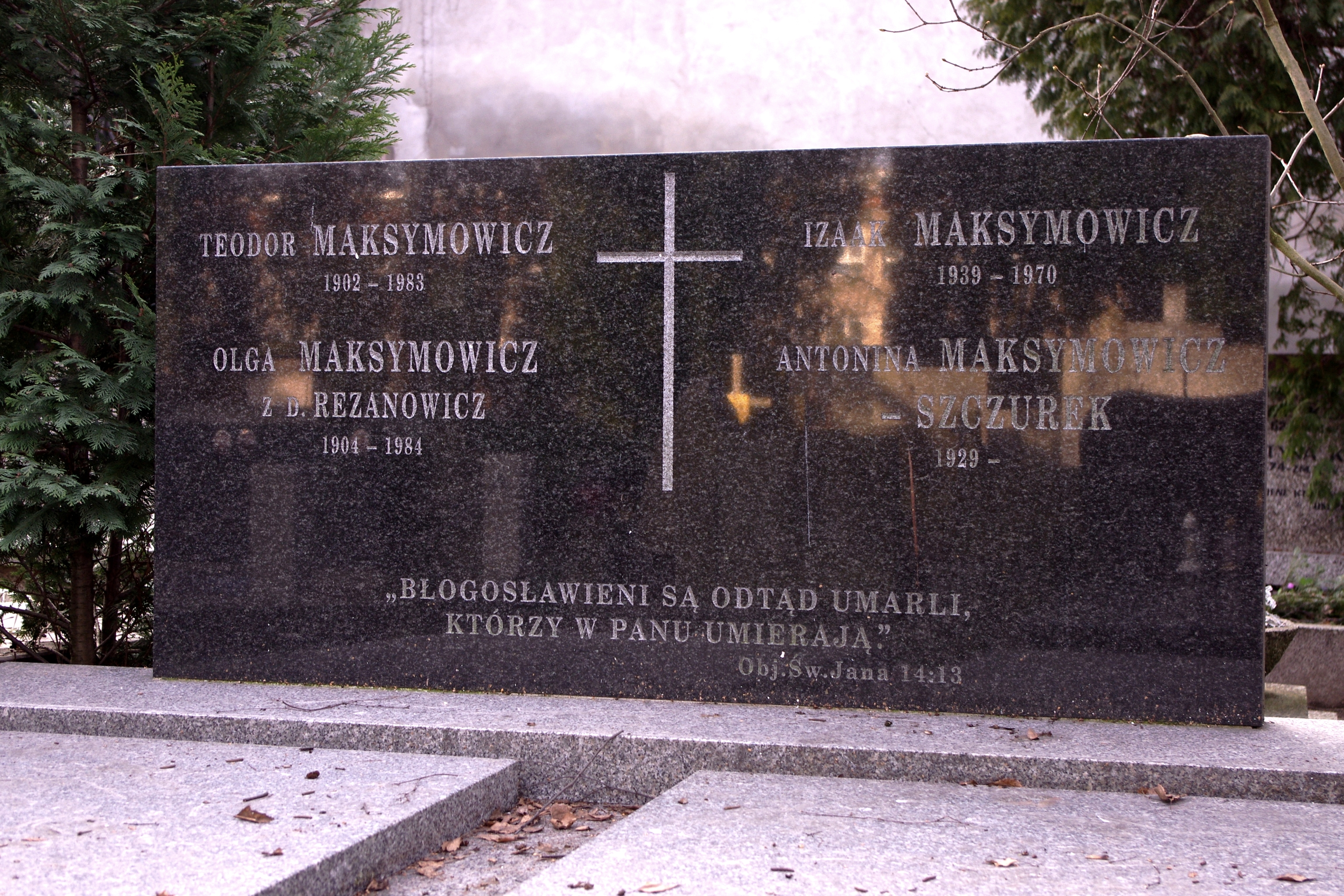
Teodor Maksymowicz's grave at the Evangelical Reformed Cemetery in Warsaw

In 1948, Maksymowicz published Zasady Wiary Kościoła Chrześcijan Wiary Ewangelicznej w Polsce (Principles of Faith of the Church of Christians of Evangelical Faith in Poland) and the hymnal Chwalebna Pieśń (Glorious Song). The former, authored by Nikolai I. Pöysti, was translated from Russian by Maksymowicz. These were the only publications by Polish Pentecostals in the post-war period. In 1949, he sought permission from the Main Office for Control of the Press, Publications and Performances to publish Głos Ewangelii (Voice of the Gospel) but was denied due to his poor reputation with authorities, who accused him of collaborating with German occupiers during the war. In 1949, he translated Paweł Rogozin's book "Откуда всё это появилось" (Where Did It All Come From) from 1939 but was not permitted to publish it in Polish.

He published articles in Polish and Russian. Before the war, he contributed to the journal Primiritiel. During the Polish People's Republic, he wrote for the monthly Chrześcijanin and the Russian-language Christianskij wiestnik, published in Argentina and edited by Zub-Zołotarew. In 1946, he noted in the latter that religious freedom in Poland was comparable to pre-1939 levels, appreciating that non-Catholics enjoyed equal rights.

Many of his notes on visits to Białystok congregations were published in the Chrześcijanin chronicle, typically authored by him. Occasionally, notes were written by companions like Kazimierz Sosulski.

== Reception ==
Stanisław Krakiewicz distrusted Maksymowicz and opposed his inclusion in the United Evangelical Church Presidium. In informant reports, he described Maksymowicz as cunning. Michał Odłyżko, a Baptist figure, also viewed him negatively. In contrast, Jerzy Sacewicz and Ludwik Szenderowski held positive opinions. Szenderowski noted in 1968 that Maksymowicz sought his advice on administrative matters.

Waldemar Lisieski considered Maksymowicz a deeply religious man whose spirituality was shaped by Kresy traditions, which he sought to promote in Polish congregations but lacked the influence to achieve this. Jakub Sielużycki believed Maksymowicz consistently pursued unity.

== Interrogation protocol (1950) ==
Protocol of the interrogation of the suspect Teodor Maksymowicz from 26 September 1950:

In the initial period after liberation, i.e., in 1945, we began organizing branches of the Christians of Evangelical Faith in our respective areas. By the end of 1945, we started establishing correspondence contacts, thus reconnecting across the country. In September 1945, Jerzy Sacewicz, who had authorization from the Baptists, arrived in Kętrzyn. Sacewicz posted an announcement on the Baptist chapel with his address. Based on this, we contacted Sacewicz and invited him to Kętrzyn. Sacewicz arrived on 17 November 1945, and under his leadership, we held the first organizational meeting, electing a chairman and deputy (...). With his help, we organized a congregation in Kętrzyn, comprising Baptists, members of the Church of Christ, and Christians of Evangelical Faith. We then advocated for cooperation with all related denominations. This situation continued until 1946 (...). Under pressure from Czerski and Januszewicz, I was forced to distance myself from the Baptists and begin independent work. Januszewicz did the same in Łódź. Since the Eastern European Mission supported cooperation with related denominations, following the example of the union in the Soviet Union, I also strove for collaboration with similar denominations in my area.

== Bibliography ==
- Jańczuk, Leszek (2014). "Ewolucja funkcji prezbitera okręgowego w Kościele Zielonoświątkowym na przykładzie Podlasia" [Evolution of the Role of Regional Presbyter in the Pentecostal Church: The Case of Podlachia]. Theologica Wratislaviensia (in Polish). 9. ISSN 1734-4182.
- Jańczuk, Leszek (2025). Teodor Maksymowicz – czołowy działacz chrześcijan wiary ewangelicznej [Teodor Maksymowicz – A Leading Figure of Christians of Evangelical Faith] (in Polish). Ostrołęka, Warsaw: OTN, WSTS. ISBN 978-83-62775-94-1.
- Mironczuk, Jan (2006). Polityka państwa wobec Zjednoczonego Kościoła Ewangelicznego w Polsce (1947–1989) [State Policy Towards the United Evangelical Church in Poland (1947–1989)] (in Polish). Warsaw: Semper. ISBN 83-89100-95-9.
- Tomaszewski, Henryk Ryszard (2009). Zjednoczony Kościół Ewangeliczny 1947–1987 [United Evangelical Church 1947–1987] (in Polish). Warsaw: Kompas II. ISBN 978-83-925744-5-3.
