= Szymon Biliński =

Polish Protestant religious activist and secret collaborator

- Born: April 16, 1899; Lviv
- Died: August 1, 1979 (aged 80)
- Years active: 1926–1955
- Religion: Protestantism
- Church: Various Protestant churches, Polish Evangelical Alliance

Szymon Biliński (16 April 1899 – 1 August 1979) was a Polish religious activist and a controversial figure in several Protestant communities in Poland, including Baptists, Evangelical Christians, Methodists, and Lutherans. He was expelled from these groups amid scandals and attempted to establish his own church. Biliński served as an unofficial collaborator with the Security Service and informed on Protestant clergy. He frequently came into conflict with the law, resulting in multiple arrests. In his later years, he emigrated to the United States.

== Biography ==
Born in 1899 in Lviv to an Orthodox family, Biliński lost his father at age 9 and was raised in the home of Baptist pastor Jan Petrasz. In 1919, he fought in the unit of Symon Petliura, and in 1920, he was interned and held in a camp in Słupiec. Between 1924 and 1926, he completed studies at the Baptist Theological Seminary in Łódź, subsequently becoming an active member of the Union of Slavic Baptist Congregations in Poland. In July 1926, he took charge of the New Covenant Community First Baptist Church in Poznań. For a brief period, he served as editor-in-chief of the Ukrainian-language Baptist monthly Pisłaniec Prawdy. In 1926, he was elected president of the Youth Associations, affiliated with the Baptist Church.

Biliński married Józefa Czarnecka (born 1901), a women's activist disowned by her parents. His career in the Baptist Church initially showed promise, and in 1926, he became a member of the church's Supreme Council. However, he was expelled from the Baptist community due to a scandal involving premarital sex. He then joined the Union of Evangelical Christians. His departure caused a split in the Baptist congregation in Kolonia Baptystów. He was later removed from the Union of Evangelical Christians for disloyalty. For a time, he was affiliated with the Methodist Church in Poland, but in 1933, he returned to the Evangelical Christians.

In 1942, Biliński moved to Warsaw. In 1944, he was deported to Neuwied for forced labor. Toward the end of the war, he was transferred to Lebenstein and liberated by American forces. The Americans moved him to a camp in Elsterberg, where he remained until the arrival of the Red Army. In August 1945, he returned to Lviv. During the war, he collaborated with the Gestapo, and after the Soviet occupation, with the NKVD under the pseudonym "Siemionov". Initially residing in Lviv, he returned to Poland as a repatriate in August 1946 and settled in Ząbki, near Warsaw, in October 1946. He worked as a preacher for the Evangelical Christians but was expelled in August 1947. Shortly after, he became a preacher for the Union of Churches of Christ, engaging in missionary activities in Warsaw and its surroundings. In September, he joined the Union of Churches of Christ Presidium and led the missionary department. However, on 12 May 1948, he was expelled from the Union of Churches of Christ. He then attempted to establish his own religious community. In 1950 and 1951, he sought employment with the Methodists, and in early 1953, he became a deacon under Bishop Zygmunt Michelis of the Evangelical Church of the Augsburg Confession.

In May 1965, Biliński was permitted to emigrate to the United States, where he lived out his remaining years in Maryland. He died on 1 August 1979. He had two sons, Aleksander (born 1929) and Bogdan (born 1930). Bogdan died in 1952.

== Polish Evangelical Alliance ==
In July 1948, alongside Eugeniusz Kupski and Kazimierz Najmałowski, Biliński attempted to form the Polish Evangelical Alliance. All three were collaborators with the Security Service. The church was intended to follow a "Soviet" model. Initially, the alliance comprised three congregations (Ząbki, Łódź, and Morawy). Biliński sought to legalize the alliance but was unsuccessful. In 1949, he was accepted on a trial basis into the Polish Ecumenical Council. In July 1950, Najmałowski and his congregation joined the Methodists, and Biliński expressed interest in returning to the Union of Evangelical Christians. However, Union of Evangelical Christians leader Szenderowski conditioned his return on an apology, which Biliński did not provide.

By 1952, only one congregation remained, led by Biliński's wife, Józefa, known as the "Patrick group", based in Bródno, a district of Warsaw. In 1955, an attempt was made to establish a congregation in Łomża. In June 1955, the Department V of the Committee for Public Security considered integrating this group into the United Evangelical Church structure. Biliński himself had officially disassociated from the group in 1952 and joined the Lutherans. In March 1952, he completed an accelerated deacon training course organized by Zygmunt Michelis. There is no evidence of the "Patrick group" continuing after 1955.

== Informant "Żebrowski" ==
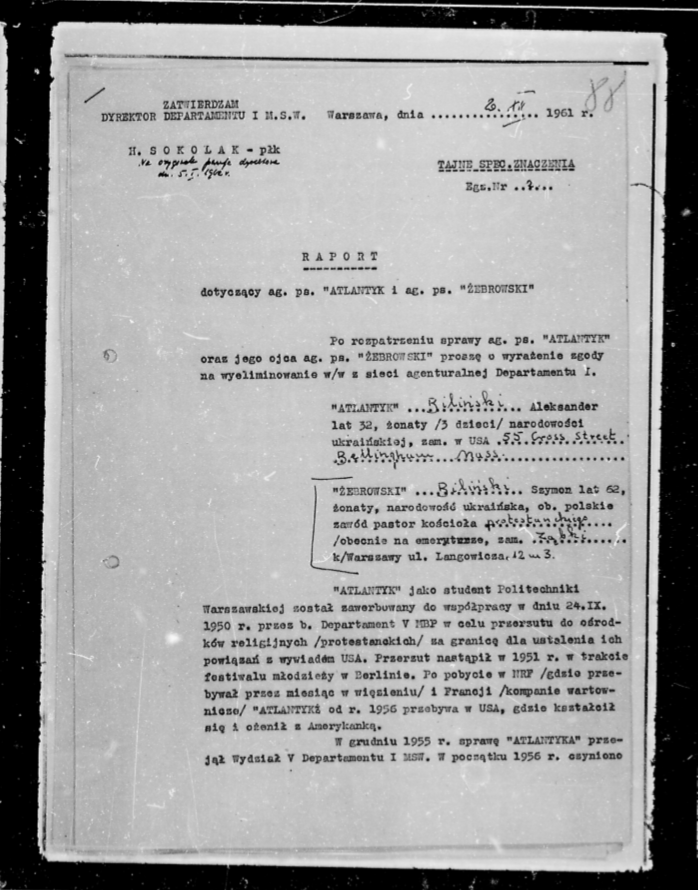
Report concerning "Żebrowski" and "Atlantyk" (son of "Żebrowski")

Biliński began working for the Security Service in February 1947, officially registered as an informant under the pseudonym "Żebrowski" on 15 March 1947. His reports contained numerous accusations against evangelical church leaders. In his first report on 14 February 1947, he described the activities of non-Catholic denominations in Poland, focusing heavily on the Methodists. He accused them of dominating the Polish Ecumenical Council, being financially robust with Western funding, and working for British or American intelligence. He claimed that Konstanty Najder, the Methodist superintendent, controlled two government ministers. He alleged that Pentecostals and Adventists were subordinate to the Methodists and noted a significant criminal element among Pentecostals of Ukrainian descent. He deemed Baptist activities highly detrimental, stating they "should have been imprisoned long ago". In later reports, he accused leaders of the United Evangelical Church in Poland, Union of Churches of Christ, and Baptist Christian Church (including Ludwik Szenderowski, Jerzy Sacewicz, Stanisław Krakiewicz, and Aleksander Kircun) of collaborating with the pre-war Sanation regime, the German occupiers, and post-war American interests.

Biliński's accusations were not limited to secret reports. In November 1948, he sent a biography to the Ministry of Public Administration, implicating evangelical leaders Szenderowski and Sacewicz in collaborating with Anglo-American intelligence. On 28 February 1949, he was interrogated at the Warsaw District Inspectorate of Financial Protection, where he accused prominent evangelical leaders of spreading anti-Soviet propaganda and serving American imperialism. He operated under multiple pseudonyms for the Security Service.

Alongside Eugeniusz Kupski ("Eagle"), Biliński was among the most prolific informants, providing damaging information about evangelical leaders. Reports from 1949 and 1950 on evangelical figures were largely based on their intelligence. On 13 November 1956, he was removed from the active informant network due to exposure, but he was re-recruited in early 1957. In 1962, he was again removed for "deceptions, lack of sincerity, and exposure within his community". A 1963 Ministry of Internal Affairs note stated that he provided "extensive information that allowed insight into the environment of minority religious groups in Poland". His son, Aleksander, was also recruited as an informant under the pseudonym "Atlantyk" on 27 November 1950.

== Legal conflicts ==
Biliński was also monitored by the Security Service and arrested multiple times for illegal possession of weapons and black-market trading. In August 1948, he was arrested for possessing firearms, during which he provided interrogators with incriminating information about evangelical leaders. He claimed he founded the United Evangelical Church but was expelled for seeking independence from American influence and was removed from the Union of Churches of Christ due to Sacewicz's fear of competition. He also claimed responsibility for causing a schism in the Baptist Church. He was released after a few days. In 1953, Department XI (formerly Department V) of the Ministry of Public Security resumed investigations into Biliński. In 1960, he was arrested for trading foreign currency and packages received from the West. He was arrested again in 1963, facing the possibility of a lengthy prison sentence.

== Reception ==
Henryk Ryszard Tomaszewski argued that Biliński was the primary contributor to the arrests of evangelical clergy in 1950. However, Jan Mironczuk downplayed Biliński's role, noting that the authorities had multiple informants at the time, and Biliński was not the most significant, as he was also under surveillance. According to Ryszard Michalak, Biliński was expelled from evangelical churches due to disloyalty and dishonesty. Karol Karski described him as having the nature of an agitator and schismatic. Leszek Jańczuk noted that Biliński "possessed a rare ability to infiltrate various Protestant circles, establish new connections, attend significant conferences and meetings, and take an interest in foreign visitors".

== Bibliography ==
- Bednarczyk, Krzysztof (1997). Historia zborów baptystów w Polsce do 1939 roku [History of Baptist Congregations in Poland Until 1939] (in Polish). Warsaw: Słowo Prawdy. ISBN 83-86586-02-8. OCLC 830212391.
- Jańczuk, Leszek (2017). "Rola agentury w inwigilacji środowiska ewangelikalnego ZKE, ZKCh i KCHWE w latach 1946-1950" [The Role of Informants in the Surveillance of the Evangelical Environment of ZKE, ZKCh, and KChWE in 1946–1950]. Studia Theologica Pentecostalia (in Polish). 5. ISSN 2300-729X. Archived from the original on 2025-01-20.
- Jańczuk, Leszek (2024). "Szymon Biliński – zapomniany działacz ewangelikalny" [Szymon Biliński – Forgotten Evangelical Activist]. Baptystyczny Przegląd Teologiczny (in Polish). VII.
- Weremiejewicz, Mirosława Regina (2014). Kościół Chrystusowy w Polsce w latach 1921–2006 [Church of Christ in Poland in 1921–2006] (in Polish). Toruń: Duet. ISBN 978-83-62558-81-0.
