= Altar Egos =

Altar Egos may refer to:

- "Altar Egos" (Arrested Development), a 2004 television episode
- "Altar Egos" (Roseanne), a 1994 television episode

== See also ==
- Alter ego (disambiguation)
