= Persecution of Jehovah's Witnesses in Communist Poland =

Repressions by communist authorities against Jehovah's Witnesses in Poland

From 1945 until 1956, there were a series of arrests and persecutions carried out by the Ministry of Public Security against Polish Jehovah's Witnesses. The aim of the communist authorities was to eliminate the religious group in Poland. The largest wave of arrests occurred on the night of 21–22 June 1950. Approximately 5,000 individuals were arrested. According to government statistics, 90% of Jehovah's Witnesses in Poland were affected during the period.

== Attitude of authorities toward Jehovah's Witnesses between 1945 and 1950 ==
After World War II, Jehovah's Witnesses were viewed critically by communist authorities from the outset due to their missionary activities, refusal of military service, and distribution of religious literature, including in German. As early as 1946, security services took an interest in Jehovah's Witnesses based on informant reports suggesting they were agitating for an election boycott.

The first government repressions against Jehovah's Witnesses began in 1946. In February 1946, officers of the Security Office raided the Branch Office of Jehovah's Witnesses in Poland in Łódź, conducting a search and arresting nearly all office staff. One individual left at the office sent a telegram about the arrests to the Branch Office in Bern, supervised by Alfred Rütimann. His intervention at the Polish embassy in Bern prompted the authorities, concerned about their international image, to release the detainees a week later.

In 1947 and 1948, provincial Security Office buildings opened and managed an object case against Jehovah's Witnesses under the codename Prawda ("Truth"). In June 1949, Józef Ptak, a Citizens' Militia officer in Kraków, was sentenced to two years in prison for allegedly passing information about planned actions against Jehovah's Witnesses. On 24 July 1949, two missionaries and graduates of the Watchtower Bible School of Gilead, Stefan Behunick and Paweł Muhaluk, were expelled from Poland, accused of being the main organizers of espionage and subversive activities on behalf of the United States, which the authorities claimed Polish Jehovah's Witnesses were conducting. In August 1949, Antoni Bista, a Jehovah's Witness from Kraków, was sentenced to two years in prison.

The immediate cause of the repressions was the refusal of both the religious organization and its individual members to sign the Stockholm Appeal. The signature collection for the appeal began on 16 April 1950. Refusal to sign was interpreted as support for "American imperialists" and opposition to the "peaceful policy" of the Soviet Union. This provided a convenient pretext for the communist authorities to initiate repressions against the group, especially since ordinary believers refused to sign, citing their neutrality toward state politics. As a result, the first wave of arrests began, aimed at eliminating the religious organization.

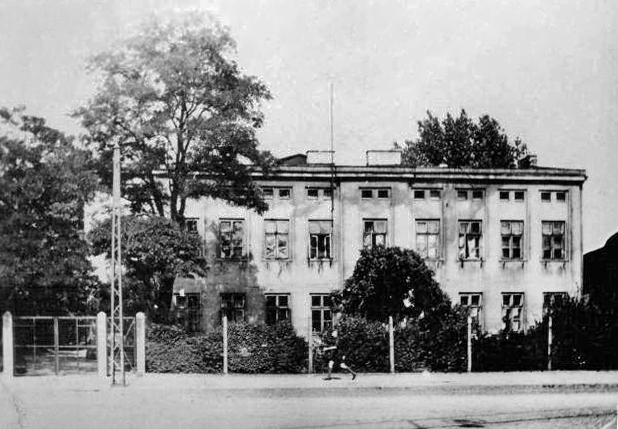
Branch Office in Łódź at 24 Rzgowska Street (1948)

On the night of 21 April 1950, a group of several dozen Security Office officers stormed the Branch Office in Łódź. They accused the staff of espionage for the United States and attempting to "violently overthrow the system of People's Poland". No evidence was found to support these charges during the search. Religious activity documents were confiscated. The next day, the office's management board was arrested, consisting of Edward Kwiatosz (chairman), Wilhelm Scheider (vice-chairman), Harald Abt (secretary), and Władysław Jędzura (treasurer). The remaining volunteers decided to print and distribute as many magazines as possible to congregations. After exhausting a 20-ton paper supply and sending out literature, they secured duplicators, typewriters, and archives. Letters from fictitious interested individuals were sent to lure remaining office staff onto Łódź's streets, where several were abducted.

== Arrests ==
On the night of 21–22 June 1950, hundreds of searches were conducted in the homes of Jehovah's Witnesses across Poland, accompanied by the first mass arrests. In Łódź and its surroundings, 107 people were detained. All remaining staff at the Branch Office were arrested and held at the Voivodeship Office of Public Security in Łódź on Karol Anstadt Avenue. Detainees faced physical and psychological abuse by Voivodeship Office of Public Security's officers. Authorities also seized meeting places for religious gatherings of Jehovah's Witnesses. On 30 June 1950, members of the Politburo of the Polish United Workers' Party – Bolesław Bierut, Jakub Berman, Józef Cyrankiewicz, Aleksander Zawadzki, Roman Zambrowski, Edward Ochab, and Zenon Nowak – decided that the alleged espionage activities of Jehovah's Witnesses on behalf of the United States should be immediately publicized in the press. A press conference was organized where Minister of Public Security Stanisław Radkiewicz described Jehovah's Witnesses as "spies of imperialism spreading war hysteria".

On 2 July 1950, a decision signed by Antoni Bida, director of the Office for Religious Affairs, was announced in the press, banning the activities of Jehovah's Witnesses in Poland. The office refused to register the Association of Jehovah's Witnesses in Poland and ordered the seizure of its assets by the state. The confiscated assets were of such low value that the appointment of a chief liquidator was deemed unnecessary.

On 25 July 1950, Director of Department V of the Ministry of Public Security Julia Brystiger issued Instruction No. 29 to all provincial and county Security Office chiefs, addressing the "liquidation of the espionage-subversive network operating under the guise of the Jehovah's Witnesses sect on behalf of American imperialis". The instruction ordered the development of a "plan for the relocation of Jehovah's Witnesses from border areas and key economic and strategic centers", leading to numerous arrests that summer. In total, around 5,000 people were arrested. Among them were approximately 150 individuals who had survived Nazi concentration camps.

Olsztyn Deputy Voivode Krzysztof Koral sent the following opinion to the Ministry of Public Security:

The attitude of the adherents toward all religions is negative, as they undermine social bonds, discipline, discredit tradition, and seek to overthrow any authority not derived from Jehovah. Their method involves intimidating the resistant and deceiving the naive (...). Their activities are distinctly anti-social and anti-democratic, as they oppose membership in any professional or social organizations. They abstain from participation in communal life and do not support any social initiatives; they oppose military and security service, discourage voting, claiming they can only give their voice to God. (...) Their main source [of support] is the USA – headquarters in Brooklyn – and Sweden.

Such materials were used as evidence in formulating charges.

== Show trials ==
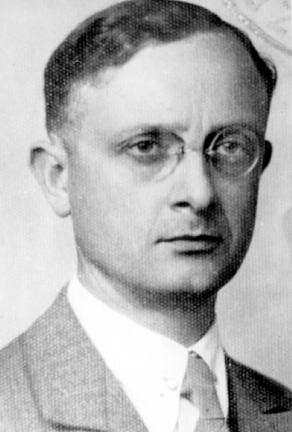
Wilhelm Scheider (imprisoned in Nazi concentration camps from 1939 to 1945 and by communist authorities from 1950 to 1956 and from 1960 to 1964)

Two show trials were conducted against Jehovah's Witnesses. From 16 to 22 March 1951, a closed trial took place before the Military District Court at 82 Koszykowa Street in Warsaw. Seven individuals, including four members of the national leadership – Wilhelm Scheider, Edward Kwiatosz, Harald Abt, and Władysław Jędzura – were on trial. Sentences ranged up to life imprisonment, with military prosecutor Major Jan Orliński demanding the death penalty for Wilhelm Scheider. Scheider was sentenced to life, the other leaders to 15 years, Władysław Sukiennik to 10 years, Jan Liczke to six years, and Naftali Glasberg to five years.

The national leadership was accused of:

Using falsified Bible verses, they preached the alleged inevitability of a war cataclysm, vilified the peace movement, discouraged soldiers from serving in the Polish Army, while glorifying the capitalist system of the United States and threatening the use of the atomic bomb (...). Proven American agents – Scheider and co-defendants – transformed the sect into an intelligence network that collected and transmitted abroad secret military, economic, and political information. Among the material evidence (...) are numerous staff maps and terrain sketches, on which the defendants marked strategically important military and industrial sites.

The second show trial occurred from 10 to 14 March 1955 in Łódź. The defendants were Jan Lorek, Władysław Sklarzewicz, Tadeusz Chodara, Mieczysław Cyrański, and Stanisław Nabiałczyk, considered by the authorities to be the leadership of Jehovah's Witnesses. Lorek, Sklarzewicz, and Chodara were sentenced to 12 years, Cyrański to eight years, and Nabiałczyk to six years. During brutal interrogations in preparation for this trial, one of the six accused died in custody, and others suffered nervous breakdowns due to the harsh methods used.

Nearly all detainees were charged with espionage for the United States (a crime under Article 7 of the Decree of 13 June 1946 on Offenses Particularly Dangerous During the Reconstruction of the State). The interrogation process followed a pattern: detainees were deprived of food and water and forced to kneel on the floor for 72 hours or confined naked for 24 days in a small concrete cell called a "dog kennel", where they could neither sit, lie down, nor stand upright. Electric shocks were regularly administered, with electrodes attached to sensitive areas like feet or chins. Defendants were hung, and when they lost consciousness, they were revived in a bathtub of water before torture resumed. Interrogators then demanded confessions to the alleged espionage.

== Second wave of arrests ==
A second wave of arrests occurred in 1952. Between 1950 and 1956, at least 16 Jehovah's Witnesses died as a result of interrogations. By 1958, 18 such cases were documented. Religious scholar Kazimierz Urban cites a figure of 40 victims, based on the account of Józef Szklarzewicz, who was permanently disabled from the interrogations.

The delegalization of Jehovah's Witnesses occurred simultaneously in Poland and the Soviet-occupied zone of Germany. The timing and methods of these actions suggest coordination between the respective security services. In the Soviet zone, between 1950 and 1961, 2,891 Jehovah's Witnesses were arrested, with 2,202 (including 674 women) sentenced to an average of five and a half years in prison for alleged anti-state activities, espionage, or "incitement to war". Of these, 60 died in custody. On 3–4 October 1950, a show trial was held against nine Jehovah's Witnesses holding leadership roles in the religious organization.

According to later published memoirs of Jehovah's Witnesses from that period, lawyer Witold Lis-Olszewski, imprisoned with Alojzy Prostak, a traveling overseer arrested in Szczecin in May 1952, was moved by Prostak's conduct and promised to defend Jehovah's Witnesses after his release. Prostak died on 11 September 1954 due to torture during interrogation. After his release, Lis-Olszewski formed a legal team that defended Jehovah's Witnesses in approximately 30 trials per month during the height of the ban.

Initially, the repressions appeared to achieve the authorities' desired effect. Following the mass arrests, the number of active Jehovah's Witnesses in Poland dropped by half. According to government statistics, the repressions affected 90% of the group. However, these measures did not halt the activities of Jehovah's Witnesses or lead to the organization's dissolution. Missionary work continued covertly, and religious literature was printed and distributed in secret. The numerical growth of the Polish Jehovah's Witness community during these persecutions was remarkable globally. The number of adult members increased by over 50% (to nearly 28,000) between 1950 and 1953. Despite approximately 40 deaths and thousands imprisoned, the organization grew. Consequently, the worldwide president of Jehovah's Witnesses, Nathan Knorr, wrote to the Polish leadership in a letter intercepted by security services: "We have done well in the last six or seven years, and we will be able to continue moving forward without their recognition."

The liquidation process was facilitated by societal hostility toward Jehovah's Witnesses, particularly from the Catholic population. The authorities, at least at the local level, were aware that Jehovah's Witnesses "focused on opposing the Vatican" but, in 1950, did not consider using them as a tool against the Catholic Church in Poland. In 1946, a representative of the Łódź Provincial Office of Public Security attempted to enlist Jehovah's Witnesses in actions against the Catholic Church. After refusals in 1946 and four months later, the authorities began obstructing their activities. During Stalinism, such cooperation was not considered. Later, authorities revisited the idea of using Jehovah's Witnesses against the Catholic Church. Meanwhile, Jehovah's Witnesses perceived the repressions as a collaboration between state authorities and Roman Catholic hierarchs.

By the end of 1955, 185 Jehovah's Witnesses (including 30 women) remained in prisons, labor camps, and detention centers for religious activities, along with 169 convicted for refusing military service. In the spring of 1956, dozens of Jehovah's Witnesses began to be released from prison. In August 1956, Wilhelm Scheider was freed. After the intense persecutions from 1950 to 1956, a brief period of calm followed, preceding renewed repressions and a strategy from 1957 to 1977 aimed at the "internal disintegration" of the Jehovah's Witnesses organization.

== See also ==
- Operation B (Poland)

== Bibliography ==
- Michalak, Ryszard (2014). Polityka wyznaniowa państwa polskiego wobec mniejszości religijnych w latach 1945–1989 [Religious Policy of the Polish State Toward Religious Minorities in 1945–1989] (in Polish). Zielona Góra: Uniwersytet Zielonogórski. ISBN 978-83-7842-124-5. Archived from the original on 2022-10-04.
