= Double Identity =

Double Identity may refer to:

- Secret identity, an alter ego of a person, often used in fiction
- Double Identity (Killmaster novel), a 1967 spy fiction novel by Manning Lee Stokes
- Double Identity (Haddix novel), a 2005 young adult novel by Margaret Peterson Haddix
- Double Identity (film), originally titled Fake Identity, a 2009 film starring Val Kilmer
- "Double Identity" (Gossip Girl), a 2010 television episode
- "Double Identity" (Quantum Leap), a 1989 television episode
- "Double Identity" (Spider-Man), a 1968 animated television episode notable for originating the "Spider-Man pointing at Spider-Man" meme

== See also ==
- Dual identity (disambiguation)
- Secret identity (disambiguation)
