= Stanisław Krakiewicz =

One of the founders of the United Evangelical Church in Poland

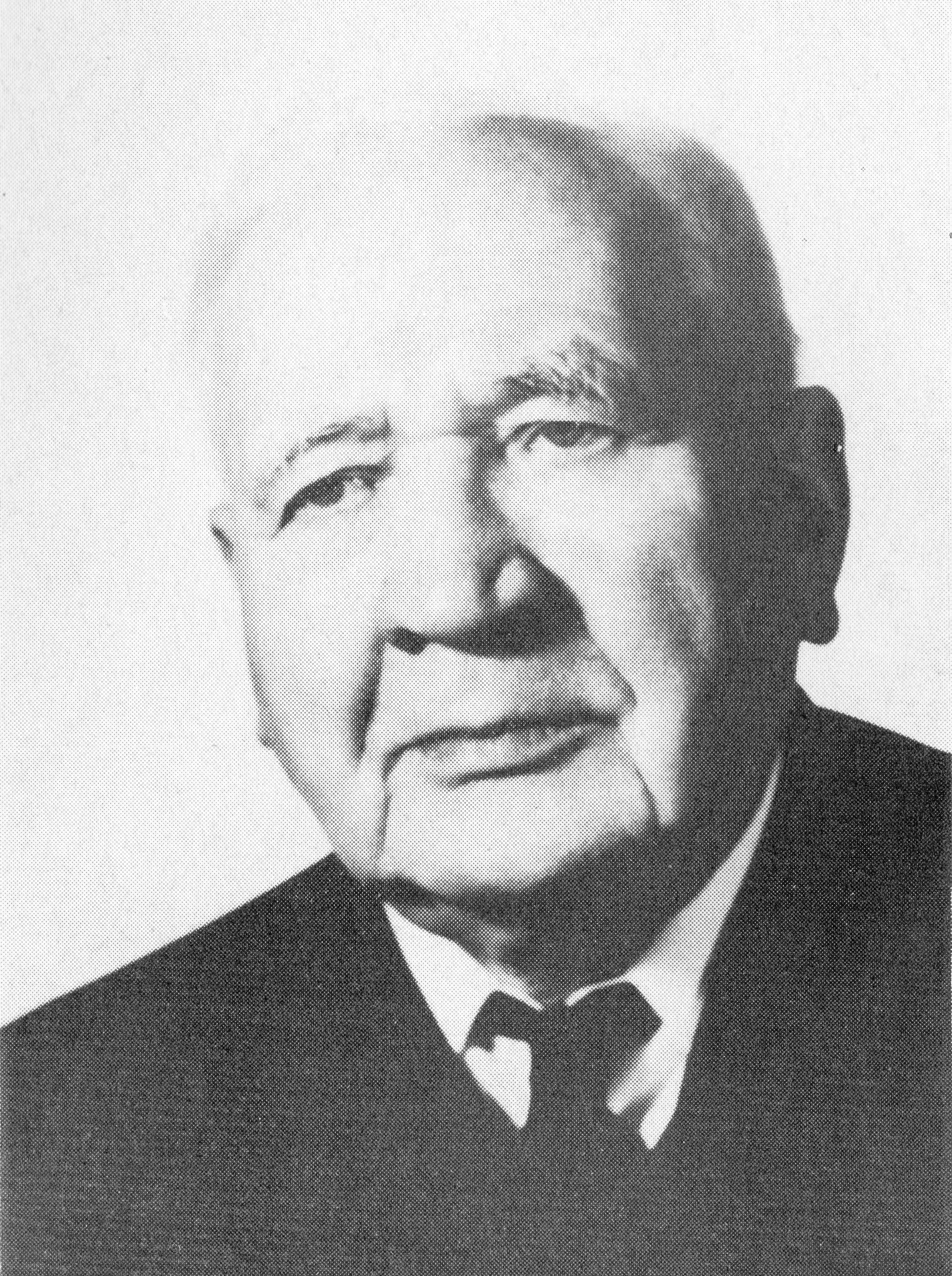
- Stanisław Krakiewicz in 1974
- Born: May 16, 1892; Dubienka
- Died: January 4, 1985 (aged 92); Warsaw
- Burial place: Evangelical Reformed Cemetery, Warsaw
- Religion: Plymouth Brethren
- Church: Baptist Christian Church of the Republic of Poland; United Evangelical Church in Poland; Free Christian Church of the Republic of Poland
- Offices held: Secretary of the Baptist Christian Church of the Republic of Poland (1945–1947); President of the United Evangelical Church in Poland (1947–1950, 1953–1975)

Stanisław Krakiewicz (born 16 May 1892 in Dubienka, died 4 January 1985 in Warsaw) was a legal advisor for the Polish Ministry of Public Works during the interwar period and actively participated in the military actions of 1920 and 1939. He was a long-time activist and one of the leaders of the Free Christians. After World War II, he became one of the founders of the United Evangelical Church, serving as its president from 1947 to 1975.

In 1950, Krakiewicz was arrested and sentenced to many years in prison. After being released in 1952 due to an amnesty, he adopted a conciliatory approach towards the authorities, for which he was repeatedly recognized. Towards the end of his life, he was expelled from the United Evangelical Church and joined the Baptists.

Krakiewicz primarily published in the monthly magazine Chrześcijanin. A collection of selected articles was published in the book Aby byli jedno (English: That They May Be One) in 1975.

== Early life ==
Stanisław Krakiewicz was born on 16 May 1892 in Dubienka, in the Lublin Voivodeship, into a Roman Catholic family. His father, Franciszek Krakiewicz (1852–1923), was a farmer and also worked as a coachman, transporting various goods and people from Hrubieszów to Dubienka. Krakiewicz had six siblings. His brother Feliks was a social activist and led a partisan group during the German occupation. Another brother, Tomasz, was a Roman Catholic priest and later, from 1907 to 1922, a member of the Mariavite Church. Part of the Krakiewicz family cooperated with the Home Army during the occupation.

Krakiewicz began his education in his hometown, completing five grades of primary school before continuing at the progymnasium in Hrubieszów (founded by Stanisław Staszic). Starting from the fourth grade of gymnasium, due to the family's difficult financial situation, he supported himself. In 1908, he continued his education at the gymnasium in Chełm, and from 1911 in Płock. He graduated from high school in 1912.

In 1908, Krakiewicz began to take an interest in politics, sympathizing with the Polish Socialist Party – Revolutionary Faction. He read brochures published by the party, propagated its ideas, and distributed leaflets during International Workers' Day celebrations. Between 1911 and 1917, he lived with the Mariavites in Płock, where he had no contact with Polish Socialist Party activists.

He enrolled in the law faculty at the University of Warsaw. He participated in the Polish–Soviet War in 1920, volunteering and being assigned to the 5th Infantry Regiment of the 18th Infantry Division. During his studies, he was interested in theosophy and messianism, reading works by Józef Jankowski, Józef Hoene-Wroński, and Blaise Pascal. His belief in the missionary role of the Polish nation accompanied him throughout his life. He graduated in 1924 with a master's degree in law.

== Legal career ==
After completing his studies, Krakiewicz began his career in the civil service. He initially worked in the Legal and Construction Department of the Ministry of Public Works. He served as a personal secretary to Józef Pruchnik, Tadeusz Jasionowski, Andrzej Kędzior, and Gabriel Narutowicz. From 1921, he worked as a personnel referent, and from 1926 as a legal advisor in the Ministry of Public Works. In 1932, he joined the Department of Construction at the Ministry of Internal Affairs, becoming the deputy head of the Legal and Construction Department. In 1936, he became the deputy chairman of the Appeals Disciplinary Commission at the Ministry of Internal Affairs.

In 1939, Krakiewicz participated in the September Campaign, being assigned to the censorship office. His unit disbanded on September 17. During the German occupation, he collaborated with a group of Polish specialists on plans for the country's future reconstruction, working with Professor Bohdan Pniewski, Adam Kuncewicz, Tadeusz Tołwiński, and Michał Kaczorowski. He spent the Warsaw Uprising period in Radość near Warsaw. In the post-war years, he worked as the head of the legal department at the Ministry of Reconstruction. He retired in 1953.

== Religious conversions ==
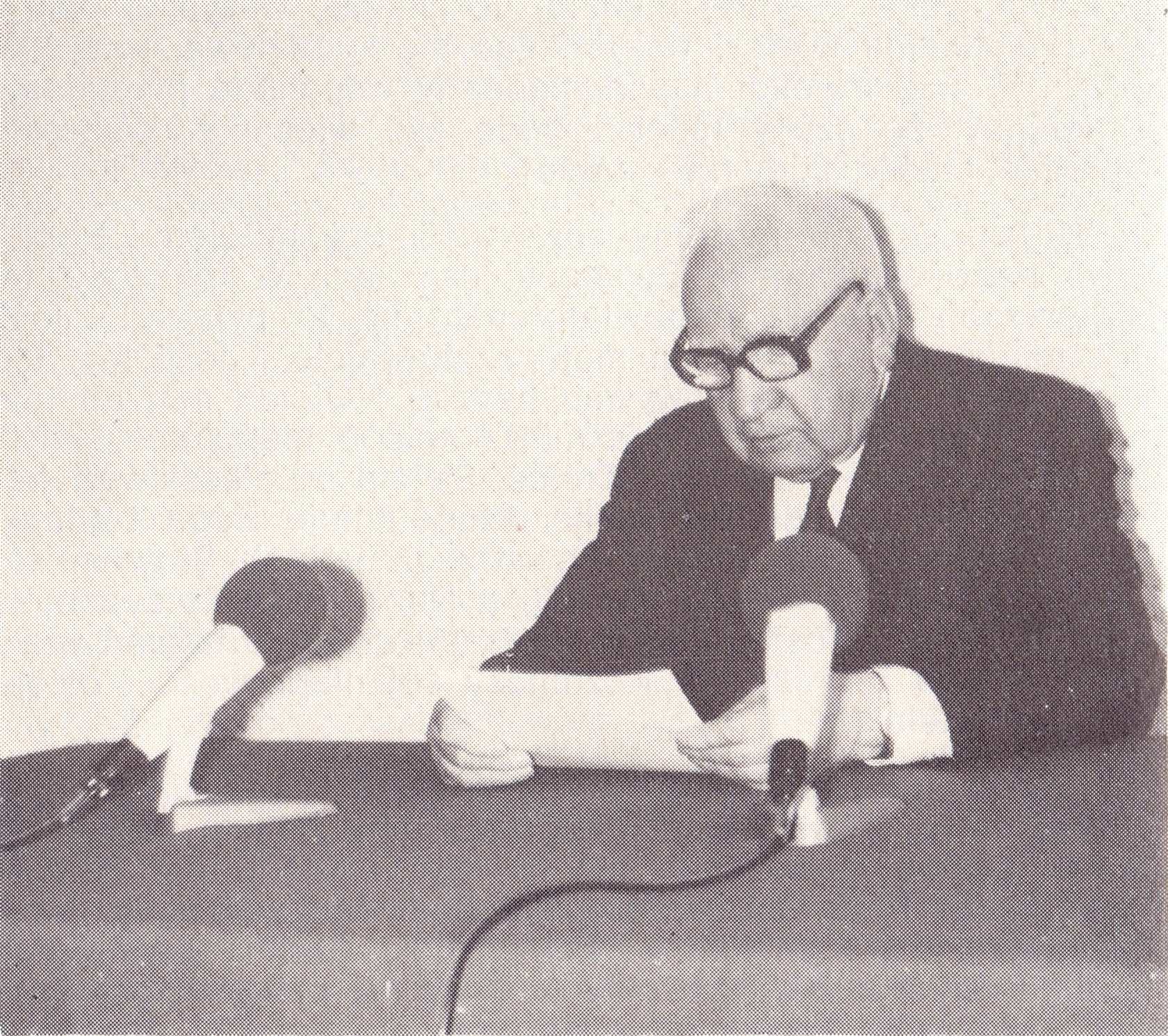
Stanisław Krakiewicz recording a sermon for the Voice of the Gospel from Warsaw broadcast (1974)

Stanisław Krakiewicz was born into a Roman Catholic family. His attachment to Catholicism was shaken after reading Andrzej Niemojewski's book Explanations of the Catechism, which argued that the catechism led to mindlessness, hypocrisy, and fanaticism. Niemojewski also critically assessed the hierarchy of the Roman Catholic Church in the context of the Mariavite movement. In 1911, Krakiewicz moved to the Mariavite monastery in Felicjanów and converted to Mariavitism. In 1914, he was ordained as a deacon by Bishop Maria Jakub Próchniewski, taking the monastic name Maria Tomasz. He left the Mariavites in 1917 and showed no interest in religious matters until 1925. From 1918, Krakiewicz engaged in political activities with the Polish Socialist Party, which he continued until 1925.

In 1925, he joined the Association of Followers of the Teachings of the Primitive Christians and soon became the leader of the Free Evangelical Christian Assembly in Warsaw, a role he later held within the United Evangelical Church for over 50 years. During the war, he closely collaborated with Baptists, a relationship he continued in the post-war years. From 1945 to 1947, he served as the secretary of the board of the Baptist Christian Church of the Republic of Poland. Between 24 and 26 May 1947, together with Ludwik Szenderowski, he organized the Brotherly Conference in Ustroń, where the United Evangelical Church was established, and he became its president.

== Arrest and imprisonment ==
The Security Office began gathering information about Krakiewicz as early as 1946. From September 1947, his correspondence was monitored. Early assessments by the Security Office inaccurately identified him, even mistaking him for a Roman Catholic. The officers were interested in his activities during the Sanation regime and the German occupation. On 24 June 1950, the Fourth and Fifth Departments of the Ministry of Public Security opened an agent investigation into Krakiewicz, suspecting him of espionage.

On the night from 19 to 20 September 1950, Krakiewicz was arrested by the Security Office during Operation B on charges of "intelligence work". During the initial interrogations, he was asked about his life story, particularly his activities in the interwar period. He was tortured during interrogations, leading to his breakdown. In April and May 1951, he provided information that partly confirmed the suspicions of the Security Office, admitting that Evangelical activists engaged in political activities before, during, and after the war. He also confirmed that foreign emissaries of sects inquired about Poland's political and economic situation, though he denied that anyone had answered such questions. His testimonies reinforced the Ministry of Public Security's belief in the legitimacy of the arrests. Arkadiusz Liberman, deputy head of Department III of Department V of the Ministry of Public Security, considered that the testimony could serve as a starting point for further investigation and provide a perspective for achieving results.

In 1951, Krakiewicz fell seriously ill for several months. A medical commission on 13 September 1951 diagnosed him with atherosclerotic degeneration of the heart muscle, hypotension, secondary anemia, and gastritis, assessing that his life was in danger.

On December 3, Władysław Góra drafted an indictment. The verdict's justification included accusations such as:

In 1932, Krakiewicz received a booklet titled 'What Awaits Us' from Bolesław Götze in Warsaw, which he kept in his library until his arrest on 19 September 1950. The booklet 'Bolshevism and Communism' slanderously depicted the conditions in the Soviet Union in the 1920s regarding youth education and the political-economic situation. In 1946, Krakiewicz resumed contacts with representatives of foreign missions belonging to related sects, namely with Leas and Fugowski, discussing the economic situation in Poland. In the summer of 1946, in Warsaw, Krakiewicz received $100 from Leas as aid, which he sold in June 1950 for 200,000 PLN, using the money to finance a lawyer for his relative.

On 19 December 1951, he was handed over to the General Prosecutor's Office along with the indictment. During the trial, the focus was on his work for the Government Delegation for Poland during the occupation. In January 1952, he was sentenced to two years in prison for "whispering propaganda" and "illegal foreign currency trade". In prison, he was surveilled, and fellow inmates reported on him, alleging that he sang religious songs in German. He was released on 8 October 1952. The prison experience left a lasting impact on him, and he was convinced that Szymon Biliński contributed to his arrest. He warned prospective clergy that they too could face imprisonment.

== President of the United Evangelical Church ==
After his release from prison, Stanisław Krakiewicz was elected as the president of the United Evangelical Church. As president, he frequently violated the existing United Evangelical Church Statute. He often stated, I will accept the position of president of the council if the Brothers entrust me with this mandate. He made efforts to expand the United Evangelical Church, encouraging Baptists to join his church, but they remained cautious and accused Krakiewicz of inconsistency. Supporting his faction, he entrusted church agendas to its activists. He maintained good relations with the Office for Religious Affairs, and Serafin Kiryłowicz trusted him. Under Krakiewicz's influence, Kiryłowicz opposed separatist tendencies within the United Evangelical Church. However, the Ministry of Internal Affairs Department IV had limited trust in him. Colonel Stanisław Wypych believed Krakiewicz did not have control over the United Evangelical Church situation.

In the 1960s, Krakiewicz had successes in effectively resolving conflicts at the congregation level. In Międzyrzecz, he attempted to take over part of the Methodist Church members by establishing a United Evangelical Church branch. In 1966, he attracted a group of Jehovah's Witnesses to the congregation in Zielona Góra, which was positively received by the authorities. He also tried to win over followers of other religious groups in Żary. In October 1966, the United Evangelical Church Presidium transferred 7,350 kg of Bible paper to the Pallottines for the needs of the Millennium Bible. This transaction was carried out without the knowledge of the Office for Religious Affairs. Stanisław Dąbrowski informed his handling officer (Major Władysław Setla) about this. Consequently, Krakiewicz and Teodor Maksymowicz (the United Evangelical Church treasurer) were summoned by political and religious authorities, which lowered their trust in Krakiewicz.

In a letter to district presbyters on 12 December 1970, Krakiewicz informed them that the United Evangelical Church was not authorized to operate outside the country's borders and, therefore, had no right to smuggle Russian Bibles into the Soviet Union. He actively participated in the activities of the Polish Ecumenical Council and the Christian Peace Conference. From 1970 to 1975, he fought against Pentecostals, trying to impose pastors from other groups on congregations where Pentecostals were the majority (e.g., in Szczecin, Legnica, Oleśnica, Wrocław, Poznań, Przemyśl).

In early 1975, on the eve of the VIII United Evangelical Church Synod, Krakiewicz realized he would not be re-elected for the next term. He sought help from the Office for Religious Affairs, assuring them of his loyalty and patriotism while criticizing some United Evangelical Church activists as “insubordinate, linked to the West, unpatriotic”. The authorities, however, did not support him, considering that Krakiewicz had already outlived his usefulness. He was removed from the president's position at the VIII Church Synod in 1975. At the request of his successor, Konstanty Sacewicz, he was given the title of honorary president. His removal from the United Evangelical Church Presidium initiated a gradual "loosening" within the United Evangelical Church. In late 1975, he discussed with Baptists the conditions under which his faction could join them. Baptists remained cautious and did not provide a concrete response. As United Evangelical Church president, he made several foreign trips.

On 8 March 1980, at a Church Council meeting, the "Krakiewicz case" and the First Warsaw congregation were discussed. Krakiewicz was blamed for all the church's ills. Only the Free Christians defended him, refusing to accept that Krakiewicz was mainly responsible for the church's poor situation. Krakiewicz was stripped of his honorary president title, removed from the pastor position, and excluded from the local Warsaw congregation due to immoral and unchristian behavior. After his sin was revealed, half the members of the First congregation left. Waldemar Lisieski and Mieczysław Kwiecień founded the Third United Evangelical Church congregation in Warsaw, while some members joined Baptists, Methodists, Lutherans, Reformed, Adventists, and other communities.

After being removed from the United Evangelical Church, Krakiewicz began attending the Baptist congregation in Warsaw, working to break up the United Evangelical Church. He died on 4 January 1985, and was buried in the Evangelical Reformed Cemetery in Warsaw (N-1-32 plot).

== Publicist activity and views ==
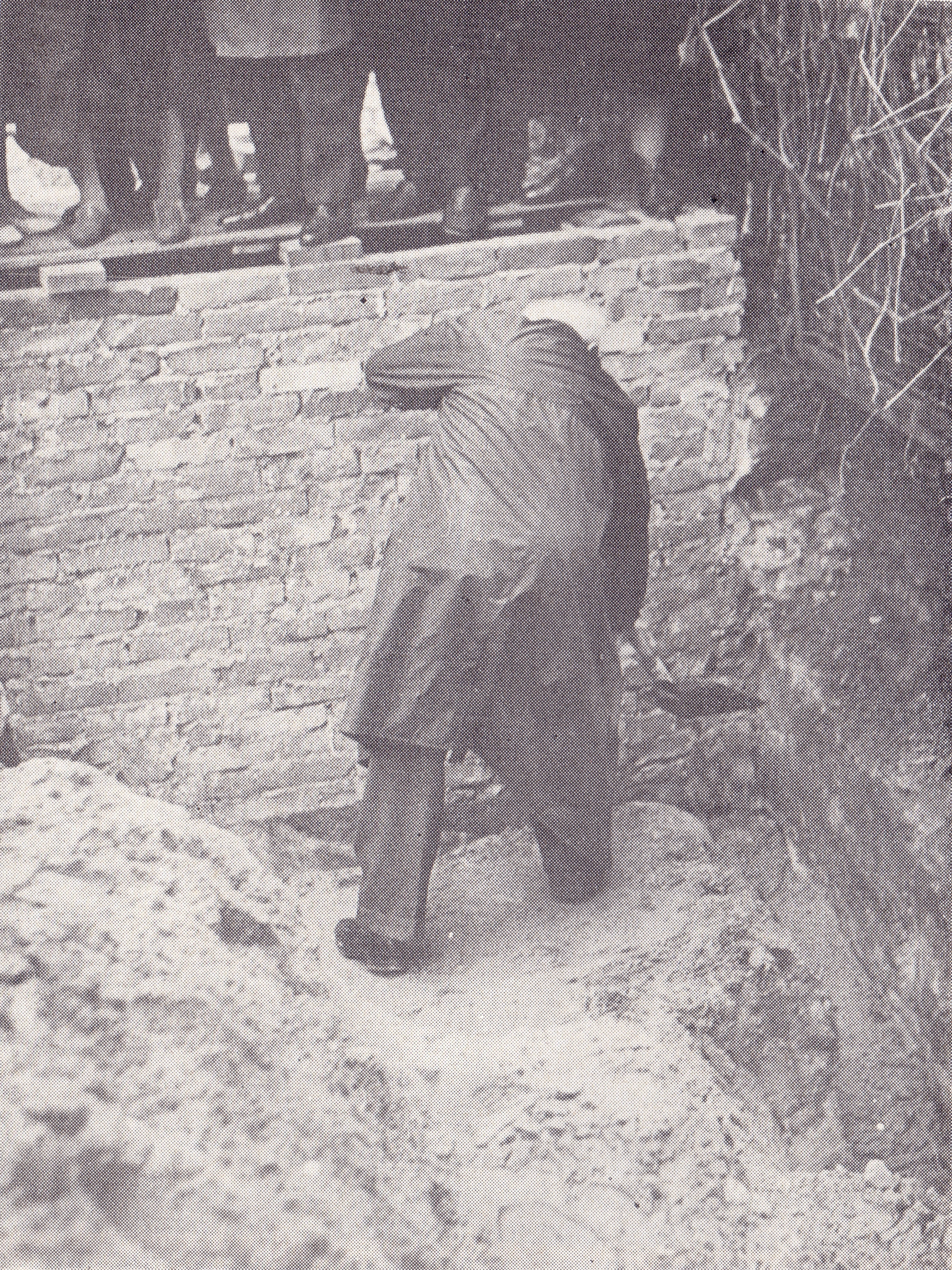
Krakiewicz laying the cornerstone for the construction of the central chapel

Stanisław Krakiewicz authored numerous articles published in periodicals such as Chrześcijanin, Jednota, Kościół Powszechny, and the Kalendarz Chrześcijanina. A collection of selected articles was published in the book Aby byli jedno in 1975, with the title taken from one of his articles. The book was released between March and April 1975. The purpose of the book was to strengthen Krakiewicz's position in the church and to convince the faithful of his vision for it. The selection of articles was made by Mieczysław Kwiecień, who wrote Krakiewicz's biography in the introduction. The biography omitted any information that could be troublesome from the perspective of his co-religionists (e.g., his activity in the Polish Socialist Party) or the authorities (e.g., his arrest and imprisonment). Information about his past with the Mariavites was also excluded due to unspecified personal grievances.

Krakiewicz believed that he lived in exceptionally difficult times, possibly even worse than the times of Nero. He saw the era as a struggle between good and evil, where one must choose a side, as neutrality was not an option. He drew historical parallels, noting that during World War I, many countries were neutral and some even prospered, but during World War II, there were few neutral countries. According to him, there is no middle ground when confronting the forces of evil.

Krakiewicz argued that everything under the sun has its time, which applies to both individuals and nations. He believed that everyone is given time to reflect on where they want to spend eternity, choosing between the narrow and wide paths. He emphasized that everyone called to life should strive to resemble Christ. He believed that his era was dangerous, with many inventions directed against humanity (e.g., nuclear, chemical, and biological weapons, environmental pollution). He acknowledged the possibility of humanity starting to conquer space, but noted that moral progress had not kept pace with technological advancements. He saw a moral decline especially in the West and placed his hopes for humanity in the East.

Krakiewicz held that God assigned each nation a specific time and space. For Poles, he argued, geographical boundaries were marked by mountains, the sea, and rivers Bug and Oder. He pointed out that the current territory of Poland matched that of the state under Bolesław I the Brave. He viewed Poland as the heart of Europe, drawing far-reaching conclusions from this fact: Whenever attempts were made by other countries to destroy this nation, it was not only Poland and its people who suffered, but all of Europe bled. He believed that attempts to destroy the Polish nation would be against God's law and would result in the downfall of all Europe. However, he also saw Poland's troubled history as a result of "our sins".

Krakiewicz had a special fondness for the Second Polish Republic. He viewed the Polish October and subsequent liberalizations in the Polish People's Republic positively. During his tenure as president of the United Evangelical Church, he rarely spoke about his activities in the Polish Socialist Party during the interwar period and was reluctant to discuss his Mariavite past. His attitude towards other denominations and ecumenism evolved over time, influenced by his roles and conversions.

== Collaboration with the Security Office ==
Stanisław Krakiewicz was an informant for the Security Office and was recruited on 25 June 1952, while still imprisoned. He was given the codename "Jan Bąk" and worked under this alias until the end of 1956. He was removed from the network of active agents on 4 December 1956. However, Krakiewicz was re-registered as a confidential informant on 8 December 1962, although he did not commence cooperation with the Fourth Department of the Ministry of Internal Affairs at that time. Between 1968 and 1980, he worked as an informant under the pseudonym "Doktór", having been blackmailed into collaboration.

Contrary to the evaluations of his handlers, not all of "Jan Bąk's" reports were truthful; he often indulged in fabrication, such as in his accounts of the financial practices of the Baptists and Methodists. His most productive year was 1953, during which he provided 33 reports. As "Doktór", he supplied about half the volume of material he had as "Jan Bąk", roughly matching his output in 1953. His last written report was submitted on 23 December 1971. From then on, all his reports were delivered orally. His handwritten reports were difficult to read, leading to errors and omissions when transcribed into typewritten documents. Names were often illegible and frequently misrecorded during copying, diminishing the operational value of his reports.

As "Doktór", Krakiewicz reported on the proceedings of United Evangelical Church leadership meetings, synods, Voice of the Gospel broadcasts, publishing matters, provided information about other churches, and created profiles of clergy members. Not all the information he supplied was accurate; notably, he did not inform the Security Office about the smuggling of Russian religious literature into the Soviet Union. He frequently reported on his rivals within the church, using his reports to undermine his opposition. His reports on his adversaries often contained falsehoods. He primarily reported on Pentecostals and members of the Christian community. Four individuals lost their jobs due to his reports, and he temporarily blocked the international travel of several others. One such instance prevented Krystyna Sokołowska from studying abroad; she later married Pastor Anatol Matiaszuk. His reports led to the opening of an operational investigation on Bronisław Stawiński in 1969 (codenamed "Christian"), which concluded only in 1988, eight years after Stawiński's death on 25 June 1980.

Krakiewicz generally portrayed his co-religionists in a positive light but had no qualms about maligning representatives of other denominations. He depicted Waldemar Lisieski (Note: Lisieski was an electronics engineer, working as a senior designer at the Experimental Department of the Office of Nuclear Technology Devices in Warsaw. He was the author of numerous papers on gamma spectroscopy (Jańczuk (2023, pp. 16, 223)).) and Mieczysław Kwiecień positively until they left his group, after which he only provided negative information about them. Occasionally, he even reported on deceased individuals.

Krakiewicz's name was included on the Wildstein List.

== Reception ==
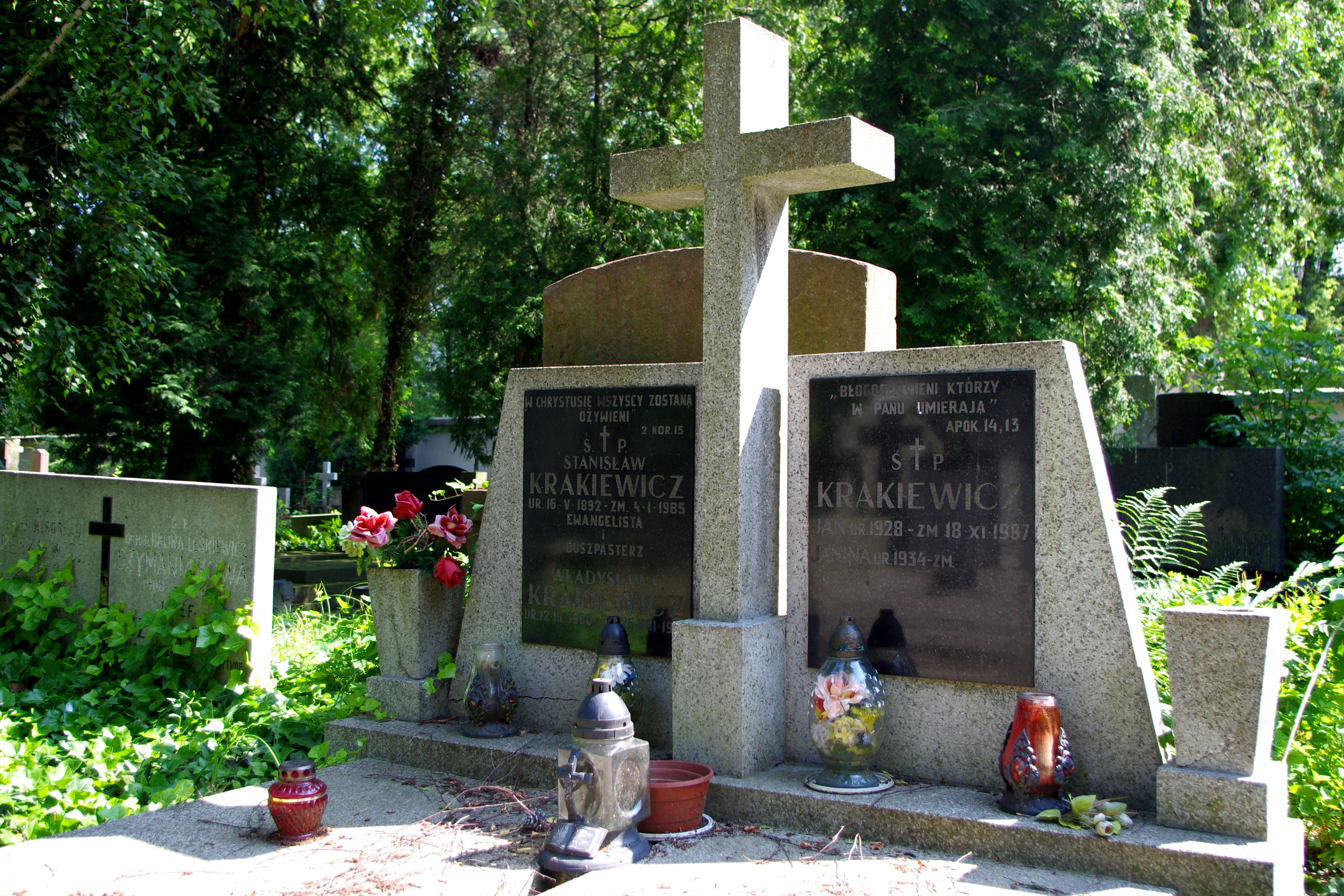
Grave of Stanisław Krakiewicz at the Reformed Cemetery on Żytnia Street in Warsaw

Stanisław Krakiewicz was positively remembered in the ecumenical circles of historical churches. Antoni Grześkowiak described him as a "sincere ecumenist" who maintained a friendly attitude towards those of different faiths. Janusz Poniewierski characterized him as a man of deep religiosity, dedicated to the cause of ecumenism. Małgorzata Winiarczyk-Kossakowska praised him as a capable organizer.

In Evangelical churches, Krakiewicz's evaluations were predominantly negative. Ludwik Szenderowski noted that while Krakiewicz spoke a lot about love, he never demonstrated it through his actions. Leading Baptist activists criticized him for being difficult to work with and for his sense of superiority. Michał Hydzik accused him of manipulating the statutes and persecuting Pentecostals. Mieczysław Czajko claimed that he wore a false mask of piety, while Edward Czajko accused him of abandoning Christocentrism. Henryk Ryszard Tomaszewski pointed out his non-compliance with the United Evangelical Church statute, his peculiar way of nominating himself for president, and his manipulation of the church's history.

Ryszard Michalak observed that Krakiewicz, during his imprisonment, drew appropriate conclusions, "distanced himself from his past", and decided to collaborate with the communist authorities. After being released, he followed the authorities' directives, suppressed internal church initiatives, and ensured the church adhered to the proper political course. The secret police generally viewed his stance positively; according to Michalak, the police expressed doubts about his stance only once in the 1960s. Tomasz Terlikowski described Krakiewicz as a person completely devoted to the authorities.

Leszek Jańczuk noted that Krakiewicz did not enjoy significant trust from the authorities; he did not always receive a passport and was not awarded the Millennium Medal. (Note: The Millennium Medal was given to leaders of the other churches. In the United Evangelical Church, it was given to Konstanty Sacewicz (Jańczuk (2023, p. 246)).) Complaints were made against him by the KGB, and Colonel Wypych from the Fourth Department of the Ministry of Internal Affairs believed Krakiewicz did not control the situation in the United Evangelical Church. Despite this, he enjoyed limited trust from the Office for Religious Affairs and was tolerated in his position only because there was no more suitable candidate for a long time. He was never forgiven for joining the church administration recognized by the German occupiers during World War II, a fact remembered by the secret police even in the 1970s.

== Personal life ==
In 1926, Krakiewicz married Władysława (née Adamczyk, 1900–1980), with whom he had two children: Jan (1928–1987) and Krystyna (1931–1975). Jan was a psychologist working in the Ministry of Education, frequently traveling to East Germany for his job. After his wife's death on 26 August 1980, Krakiewicz remarried Teresa Bieniada on 29 November 1980. Teresa, 54 years younger than Krakiewicz, was a doctor of pedagogy and an academic, working at the Academy of Special Education.

== Books ==
- Prawo budowlane i zagospodarowanie przestrzenne oraz odbudowa. Cz. 1, (Przepisy wydane po wojnie) (1947) [co-authored with G. Szymkiewicz]
- Prawo budowlane i zagospodarowanie przestrzenne oraz odbudowa. Cz. 2, (Przepisy wydane przed wojną) (1948) [co-authored with G. Szymkiewicz]
- Prawo budowlane i zagospodarowanie przestrzenne oraz odbudowa. Uzupełnienie części 1, (Przepisy wydane w czasie druku książki do dnia 27.I.1948 r.) (1948) [co-authored with G. Szymkiewicz]
- Prawo budowlane i zabudowanie osiedli oraz odbudowa. Cz. 3, Przepisy wydane po 1.IX.1947 r. (1949) [co-authored with G. Szymkiewicz]
- Prawo budowlane i zabudowanie osiedli oraz odbudowa. Dodatek do cz. III, (1950) [co-authored with G. Szymkiewicz]
- Prawo budowlane i zabudowanie osiedli oraz odbudowa (1951) [co-authored with G. Szymkiewicz]
- Aby byli jedno (1975)

== Orders and decorations ==
- Gold Cross of Merit for city planning of Łódź (11 November 1936)
- Gold Cross of Merit for drafting the country's reconstruction plans (1946)
- Silver Badge for the reconstruction of Warsaw (1947)
- Knight's Cross of the Order of Polonia Restituta (1969 or 1971)
- Medal of the 30th Anniversary of People's Poland

== Bibliography ==
- Czajko, Mieczysław (2014). "Prezbiter Aleksander Rapanowicz – droga cierpienia. Część II". Studia Theologica Pentecostalia (in Polish). 2. WSTS. Archived from the original on 2016-08-09.
- Grześkowiak, Antoni (1985). "Prezbiter Stanisław Krakiewicz (1892–1985)". Studia i Dokumenty Ekumeniczne (in Polish) (3–4).
- Jańczuk, Leszek (2017). "Rola agentury w inwigilacji środowiska ewangelikalnego ZKE, ZKCh i KCHWE w latach 1946–1950". Studia Theologica Pentecostalia (in Polish). 5 (3–4).
- Jańczuk, Leszek (2023). Stanisław Krakiewicz – wieloletni zwierzchnik Zjednoczonego Kościoła Ewangelicznego (in Polish). Ostrołęka – Warsaw: Ostrołęckie Towarzystwo Naukowe. ISBN 978-83-62775-61-3.
- Kwiecień, Mieczysław (1975). "Droga życia (Szkic biograficzny)". In Krakiewicz, Stanisław (ed.). Aby byli jedno (in Polish). Warsaw: ZKE.
- Michalak, Ryszard (2014). Polityka wyznaniowa państwa polskiego wobec mniejszości religijnych w latach 1945–1989 (in Polish). Zielona Góra: Uniwersytet Zielonogórski. ISBN 978-83-7842-124-5.
- Mironczuk, Jan (2006). Polityka państwa wobec Zjednoczonego Kościoła Ewangelicznego w Polsce (1947–1989) (in Polish). Warsaw: Semper. ISBN 83-89100-95-9.
- Sobiech, Janusz (2019). Pierwochrześcijanie: Zrzeszenie Zwolenników Nauki Pierwotnych Chrześcijan w latach 1912–1947 (in Polish). Warsaw: CLC. ISBN 978-83-954247-0-0.
- Tomaszewski, Henryk Ryszard (2009). Zjednoczony Kościół Ewangeliczny 1947–1987 (in Polish). Warsaw: KOMPAS II. ISBN 978-83-925744-5-3.
- Zieliński, Tadeusz J. (2013). Protestantyzm ewangelikalny. Studium specyfiki religijnej (in Polish). Warsaw: ChAT. ISBN 978-83-60273-30-2.
