= Dual identity =

Dual identity can refer to:

- A secret identity, such as Clark Kent and Superman
- In mathematics, the coidentity of a dual group object or the counit of a coalgebra
- In sociology, double consciousness

== See also ==
- Double Identity (disambiguation)
- Secret identity (disambiguation)
