= Alter Ego (comic) =

2019 yuri comic by Ana C. Sánchez

- Volume 1 cover
- Author: Ana C. Sánchez
- Website: Editorial Planeta
- Launch date: October 15, 2019
- Publishers: Editorial Planeta (Spanish); Tokyopop (English)
- Genre(s): Romance, yuri

Alter Ego is a romance yuri comic written and illustrated by Spanish artist Ana C. Sánchez. It has been serialized in Editorial Planeta's Spanish manga-themed anthology magazine Planeta Manga from October 2019, and is licensed for an English-language release by Tokyopop.

== Synopsis ==
Noel has always been in love with her best friend Elena, but she's never dared confessing her true feelings. When her Elena starts dating a boy, Noel's world crumbles as she sees her chance at love slipping away. One night, in a moment of desperation, Noel confesses her feelings for Elena to a complete stranger. However, the stranger turns out to be a girl named June, Elena's other best friend who has just moved back to the area. While Noel is at first angry that June now knows her feelings for Elena, she quickly realizes that June also likes Elena, and the pair become bound by the unrequited love triangle they find themselves in.

== Media ==
=== Manga ===
Written and illustrated by Ana C. Sánchez, Alter Ego began serialization in Editorial Planeta's Spanish manga-themed anthology magazine Planeta Manga on October 15, 2019. The series has been collected into 2 volumes as of November 27, 2024.

The series is licensed for an English release in North America by Tokyopop.

No.	Original release date	Original ISBN	English release date	English ISBN
1	March 24, 2021	978-84-1341-595-6	February 23, 2021	9781427867568
2	November 27, 2024	978-84-1140-441-9	June 24, 2024	9781427877048

=== Audiobook ===
On January 24, 2025 an audiobook adaptation of the first volume was released by Planeta Cómic.

== Reception ==
Erica Friedman of Yuricon gave the first volume and overall 7 out of 10 rating, noting that “Overall, this is a fine one-volume story, that has a lot of the strengths and weaknesses of one-volume stories."
