= Covert agent =

Employee of an intelligence service

The term covert agent can have many meanings, depending on context.

== United States ==
As it is used in the United States Intelligence Community, it is legally defined in 50 USCA §426.

The definition is subject to judicial interpretation, but a reading of the plain language of that statute reveals that a covert agent can be an employee of the US intelligence agencies or a private citizen working on behalf of that community.

=== Cornell Law definition ===
The term covert agent means:

(A) a present or retired officer or employee of an intelligence agency or a present or retired member of the Armed Forces assigned to duty with an intelligence agency—

(i) whose identity as such an officer, employee, or member is classified information, and
(ii) who is serving outside the United States or has within the last five years served outside the United States; or

(B) a United States citizen whose intelligence relationship to the United States is classified information, and—

(i) who resides and acts outside the United States as an agent of, or informant or source of operational assistance to, an intelligence agency, or
(ii) who is at the time of the disclosure acting as an agent of, or informant to, the foreign counterintelligence or foreign counterterrorism components of the Federal Bureau of Investigation; or

(C) an individual, other than a United States citizen, whose past or present intelligence relationship to the United States is classified information and who is a present or former agent of, or a present or former informant or source of operational assistance to, an intelligence agency.

=== Identity protection ===
The law against unmasking the identities of U.S. spies says a "covert agent" must have been on an overseas assignment "within the last five years."

The law says that if someone reveals the identity of a covert agent to a third party, "knowing that the United States is taking affirmative measures to conceal such covert agent's intelligence relationship to the United States", can get up to 10 years in prison. If this third party then tells anyone else, they can get no more than 5 years in prison.

=== Famous cases of "outing" ===
In the 1960s and 1970s, anti-CIA activists occasionally revealed long lists of overseas intelligence agents to sabotage their activities.

In the first decade of the 21st century, a controversy arose in which the White House itself revealed an agent's identity. In that case I. Lewis "Scooter" Libby was found guilty of perjury and obstruction of justice. A court filing by Special Counsel Patrick Fitzgerald during his sentencing hearing asserted that Valerie Plame was indeed a covert agent at the time.

== See also ==
- Espionage
- Undercover
