= Michał Hydzik =

Polish Pentecostal clergyman

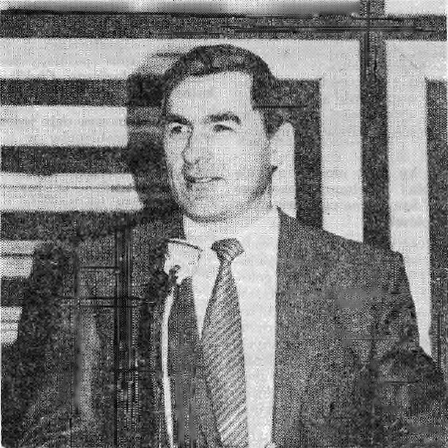
- Michał Hydzik (1989)
- Born: January 2, 1944; Brzeżawa
- Died: April 13, 2017 (aged 73)
- Years active: 1988–2000
- Religion: Pentecostalism
- Church: Pentecostal Church
- Offices held: Chief Presbyter of the Pentecostal Church

Michał Hydzik (born 2 January 1944 in Brzeżawa, died 13 April 2017) was a Polish Pentecostal clergyman, pastor, and evangelist who served as the chief presbyter of the Pentecostal Church from 1988 to 2000. Prior to that, he was a clergyman and district presbyter of the United Evangelical Church and a member of the United Evangelical Church Presidium from 1984 to 1987. In the Pentecostal community, he was known for his prayers for healing. He authored five books and numerous articles. Hydzik had an interest in demonology and eschatology. He was an anti-ecumenist, uninterested in closer cooperation with related Evangelical groups, but he aspired to unite all Pentecostal movements.

== Early life ==
Michał Hydzik was born in Brzeżawa, Przemyśl County, on 2 January 1944. In 1946, his father, who was a preacher in the Christian Faith Evangelical Church, was killed along with other members of the congregation. The exact reasons for these murders remain unclear. (Note: Hydzik (2015, pp. 14–15) suspected that it was carried out by the Ukrainian Insurgent Army, and the reason was that his father had married a Ukrainian woman. Another reason, according to Hydzik, could have been religious motives.) Due to the difficult situation in his family, the headmaster of his elementary school sent him and his brother to an orphanage. Hydzik later pursued and obtained a teaching qualification, returned to Brzeżawa, and worked as a teacher. In November 1963, Hydzik converted to Christianity following a sermon by Kazimierz Sosulski. In the spring of 1964, he experienced the baptism with the Holy Spirit and received believer's baptism in the summer. Soon after, he was dismissed from his teaching job due to ideological accusations. He began studies at the Christian Theological Academy in Warsaw but had to interrupt them to take care of his sick mother. During the 1960s, he faced repression from the communist authorities and was suspected by the Security Service of collaborating with the Workers' Defence Committee after 1976.

In 1966, Hydzik married Tatiana Ilczuk, with whom he had three children: Małgorzata, Dorota, and Daniel.

From 1966 to 1976, as a member of the United Evangelical Church in Wapienica near Bielsko-Biała, Hydzik served as an evangelist and district youth leader. In 1978, he was ordained as a presbyter by Konstanty Sacewicz and Jan Guńka. Hydzik recounted in his autobiography that the congregation had previously requested his ordination from the United Evangelical Church authorities when Stanisław Krakiewicz led the church, but it was denied because they considered him "too radical a Pentecostal". It was only after Sacewicz became the leader that his ordination was realized.

From 1976 to 1987, Hydzik was the pastor of the United Evangelical Church "Betel" congregation in Ustroń. He introduced monthly healing services, and under his leadership, the congregation grew from 35 to over 200 members in ten years. They built the largest Evangelical prayer house in Poland at that time, with a hall for 600 people. Each summer, he organized youth courses in Głębce, Koszalin, and Przemyśl, adhering to an unwritten rule that no one could leave without receiving the baptism with the Holy Spirit. Hydzik became known for his openness to the practical use of spiritual gifts, which bolstered his authority in the Pentecostal community.

== Career as a clergyman ==
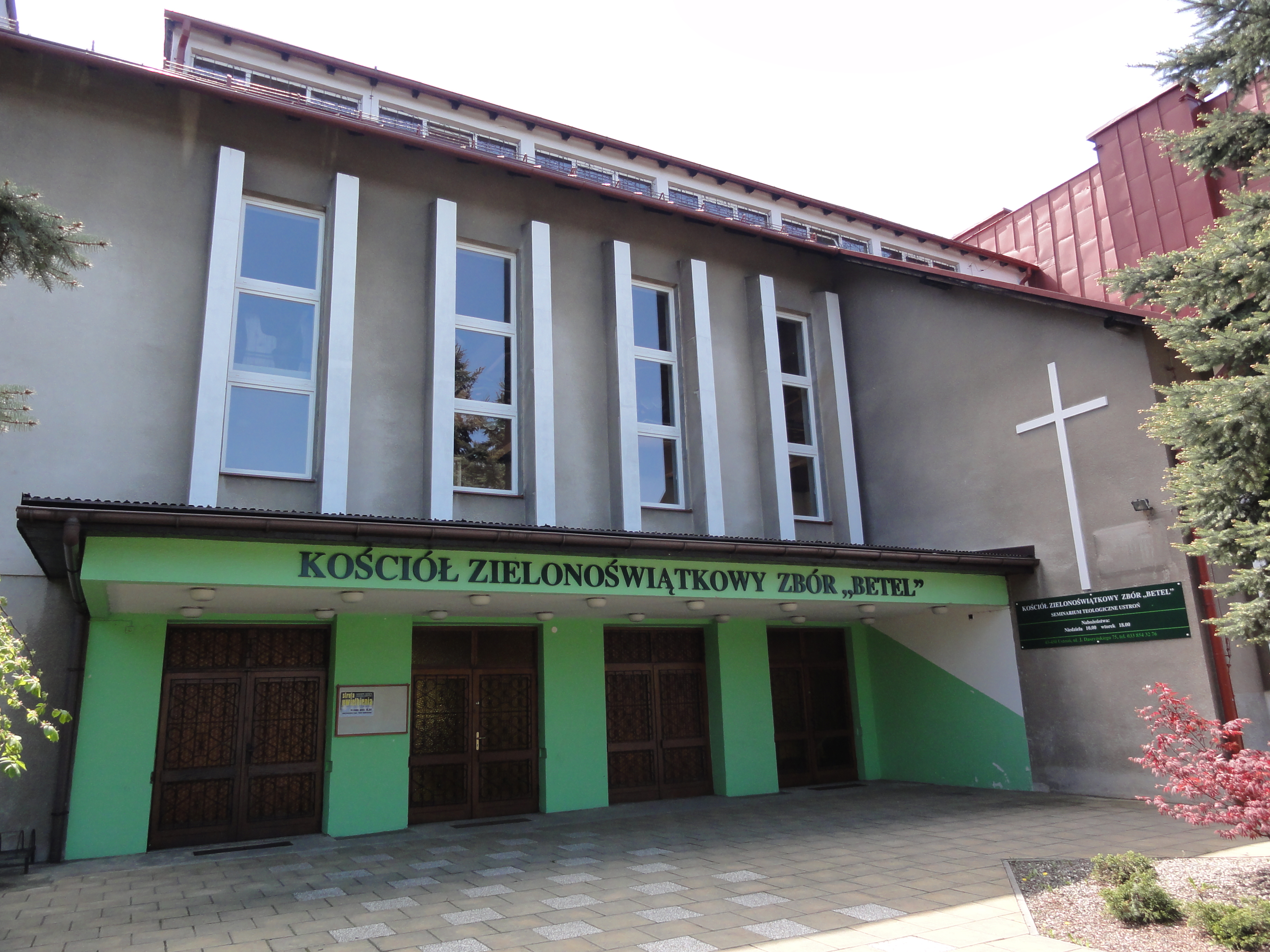
Church of the Betel congregation

In 1984, he became a member of the Presidium of the United Evangelical Church. He conducted talks with representatives of the Christian Pentecostal Fellowship, encouraging them to join the United Evangelical Church.

On 13 September 1986, at a meeting of the United Evangelical Church Council, he submitted a proposal for the independence of the individual constituent groups of the church. The proposal was accepted in December at the next council meeting. The decision for reorganization was made by the XII Synod of the United Evangelical Church.

In 1987, he became the presbyter of the southern district of the United Evangelical Church. At the first synod of the newly formed Pentecostal Church, he was elected the chief presbyter. The Security Service did not approve of him in this position and intended to remove him. However, the political changes prevented this plan from being carried out. Hydzik's leadership was not accepted by a group of congregations from Lublin, which was one of the reasons for the formation of the Christian Faith Evangelical Church. He served as the chief presbyter until 2000.

During his first term in this position (1988–1992), 57 new congregations were established; during the second term (1992–1996), 31 congregations; and during the third term (1996–2000), 18 congregations. According to Michał Hydzik, this growth was largely due to the tent mission. As chief presbyter, he desired to integrate the entire Pentecostal movement in Poland and initially had a lot of enthusiasm for this goal. He initiated joint meetings for this purpose. However, during the discussions, representatives of other groups limited themselves to criticizing these initiatives, accusing the Pentecostal Church of trying to absorb them and not presenting their own proposals.

As chief presbyter, he prioritized Evangelistic and missionary work. He also continued healing prayers, visiting many congregations. (Note: Some of the testimonies of the people he prayed over were published in Samarytanka.) During his leadership, the church faced new forms of Pentecostal piety. According to Mieczysław Czajko, Hydzik contributed significantly to the numerical growth of Polish Pentecostalism. Marek Kamiński described him as a charismatic leader. He was respected not only within the Pentecostal Church but also outside it (e.g., in the Church of God in Christ).

From 2000 to 2008, he was the pastor of the Filadelfia congregation in Bielsko-Biała, and from 2005, he was again the pastor of the Betel congregation in Ustroń. As a result, he served as a pastor in two congregations for three years. He remained the pastor in Ustroń until 2014, when he resigned from all church offices.

As a preacher, he ministered in many places in Poland and worldwide. He preached at the European Pentecostal Conference and the World Pentecostal Conference. In the US, he ministered at John Osteen's congregation in Houston and David Wilkerson's congregation at Times Square in New York. In his autobiography, he wrote that he fondly remembered annual evangelistic events in Wrocław, Nysa, Opole, Zielona Góra, Nowa Sól, Gliwice, Bydgoszcz, Hajnówka, Łódź, and Przemyśl.

== Views ==
=== Ecumenism ===
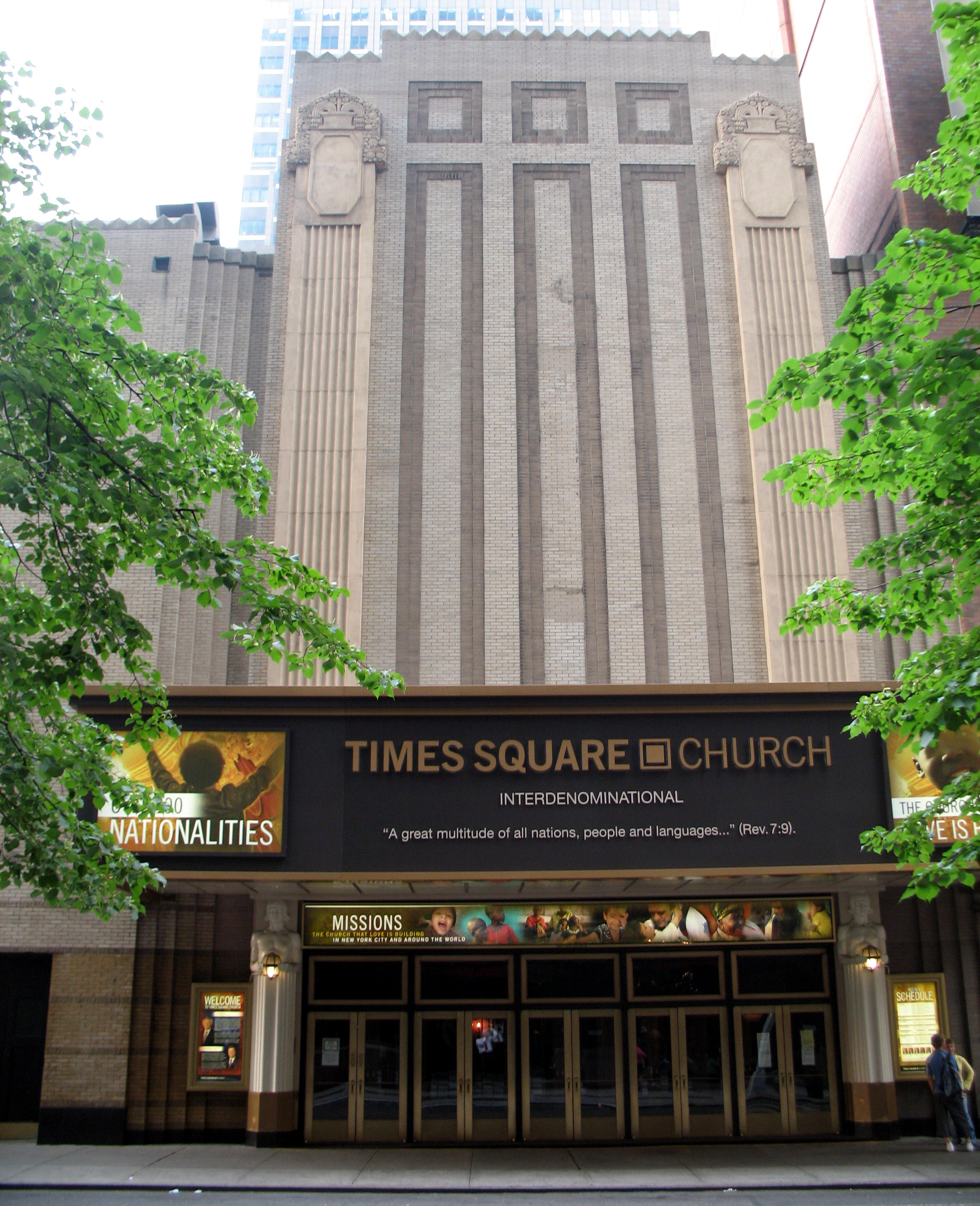
Times Square Church in New York City

He viewed the United Evangelical Church negatively during the time when Stanisław Krakiewicz was its leader. He claimed that Pentecostals were persecuted, citing himself and the congregation in Przemyśl as examples, where the church authorities did not want to accept a Pentecostal as pastor. His opinion of the United Evangelical Church did not change when he joined the church leadership. He stated that he often returned from many meetings "tired, discouraged, and disappointed". He accused other groups of dishonesty towards Pentecostals, giving the example of the congregation in Malinka, which was excluded by the strict Christian faction but later accepted by another United Evangelical Church-affiliated group.

As a member of the Presidium, he sought the church's withdrawal from the Polish Ecumenical Council and the dissolution of the United Evangelical Church. On 30 March 1984, at a United Evangelical Church Council meeting, he submitted a motion to withdraw from the Polish Ecumenical Council. During the discussion, it was decided that the synod should make the final decision on this matter. Hydzik was perceived as an anti-ecumenist who significantly contributed to the dissolution of the United Evangelical Church. However, when the Pentecostal Church was established in 1988, he advocated for the new church's membership in the Polish Ecumenical Council. Although he showed little interest in non-Pentecostal groups, he did meet with Catholic Charismatic Renewal activists (until 1997).

He was a proponent of uniting all Pentecostal denominations into one church and was personally involved in this matter. However, he did not achieve any success in this area. He did not engage in the formation of the Evangelical Alliance. In his autobiography, he stated that he painfully experienced the fact that it was easier to reach an understanding with non-Pentecostal Evangelical groups than with closer Pentecostal-like groups.

=== Demonology ===
Hydzik was interested in demonology. In 1983, he wrote an article on the subject in Chrześcijanin magazine (The Exorcism of Demons), and in 2004, he published an entire book titled Enemies. He distinguished between provoked and unprovoked possession. Demons, he believed, could not tolerate talk about the blood of Christ. He asserted that only certain individuals should perform exorcisms and that they should never do so alone. Hydzik also noted that some people in contemporary times feign possession. He rejected Derek Prince's teaching on so-called generational curses (which claims that if any ancestor engaged in spiritualism, it brought a curse upon all their descendants).

On 16 February 2013, a conference titled Ministry of Deliverance was organized to establish the church's position on demonology. The direct reason for this conference was the exorcism activities of Janusz Lindner, a pastor from Krotoszyn. Hydzik was one of the speakers at the conference.

=== Other views ===
Hydzik believed that nature is the second book, after the Bible, that testifies to the existence of God. According to him, there are no coincidences in nature; everything exists with purpose.

All religious meetings should be marked by optimism and enthusiasm. Sad, gloomy Christianity will attract no one. Let's express our joy for salvation, for the fact that Jesus reigns in our lives.

Initially, he was a proponent of the "second wave" of Pentecostalism known as the charismatic movement and promoted this movement within the church. However, from the mid-1990s, he gradually evolved towards classical Pentecostalism. When the issue of "intercessors" arose in the late 1990s, he was unable to take a definitive stance, which was criticized by his successor, Mieczysław Czajko. Hydzik responded that he was emotionally connected to the individuals in the "intercessor" movement, initially saw them as the future of the church, and therefore left the resolution of this issue to his successor.

In his book What Awaits Us? (1994), he expressed the controversial view that the generation of 1948 (Note: The creation of the independent state of Israel was announced this year.) would not die a natural death (i.e., people born in that year would witness the end of the world). He based this speculation on the text from Luke 21:32. In the second edition of the book, published in 1998, this view was softened to: We can infer that the final events may happen very soon. However, in his 2016 commentary on the Apocalypse, he did not address this topic. He applied a Darbyite interpretation to the Apocalypse.

== Publications ==
=== Books ===
- Hydzik Michał (1994). Co nas czeka? (in Polish) (1 ed.). Warsaw: Chrześcijańska Misja Kobiet. ISBN 83-903467-2-9.
- Hydzik Michał (1995). Kim dla Ciebie jest Duch Święty? (in Polish). Warsaw: WYDAWNICTWO WAM. ISBN 83-903467-0-2.
- Hydzik Michał (2004). Nieprzyjaciele (in Polish). Skoczów: Chrześcijańska misja kobiet. ISBN 8390346737.
- Hydzik Michał (2015). Księga mojego życia (in Polish). Skoczów: Chrześcijańska Misja Kobiet. ISBN 978-83-903467-5-5.
- Hydzik Michał (2016). Apokalipsa, czyli co nas czeka? (in Polish). Warsaw: Chrześcijańska misja kobiet. ISBN 978-83-903467-6-2.

=== Articles ===
- Hydzik, Michał (1983). "Wypędzanie demonów". Chrześcijanin (in Polish). 6: 10–16.
- Hydzik, Michał (1988). "Kościół Zielonoświątkowy". Chrześcijanin (in Polish). 7–8: 26–27.
- Hydzik, Michał (1989). "Emigracja". Chrześcijanin (in Polish). 1: 12–13.

== Bibliography ==
- Czajko, Mieczysław (2014). Życie, życie moje... (in Polish) (2 ed.). Szczecin: Compassion. ISBN 978-83-7978-007-5.
- Hydzik, Michał (1977). "Bóg jest Bogiem porządku". Chrześcijanin (in Polish). Warsaw: ZKE.
- Hydzik, Michał (2015). Księga mojego życia (in Polish). Skoczów: Chrześcijańska Misja Kobiet. ISBN 978-83-903467-5-5.
- Jańczuk, Leszek (2016). "Ekumenizm polskiego środowiska ewangelikalnego". Roczniki Teologiczne (in Polish). LXIII (7). KUL.
- Jańczuk, Leszek (2016). "Wspólnoty pentekostalne w Polsce i ich klasyfikacja". Łódzkie Studia Teologiczne (in Polish). 25 (4). Wyższe Seminarium Duchowne w Łodzi.
- Kamiński, Marek (2012). Kościół Zielonoświątkowy w Polsce w latach 1988–2008 : Studium historyczno-ustrojowe (in Polish). Warsaw: Warszawskie Seminarium Teologiczne. ISBN 978-83-905704-8-8.
- Tomaszewski, Henryk Ryszard (2009). Zjednoczony Kościół Ewangeliczny 1947–1987 (in Polish). Warsaw: KOMPAS II. ISBN 978-83-925744-5-3.
