= United Evangelical Church in Poland =

Former religious organization in Poland

United Evangelical Church of the Polish People's Republic
- Zjednoczony Kościół Ewangeliczny w Polskiej Rzeczypospolitej Ludowej
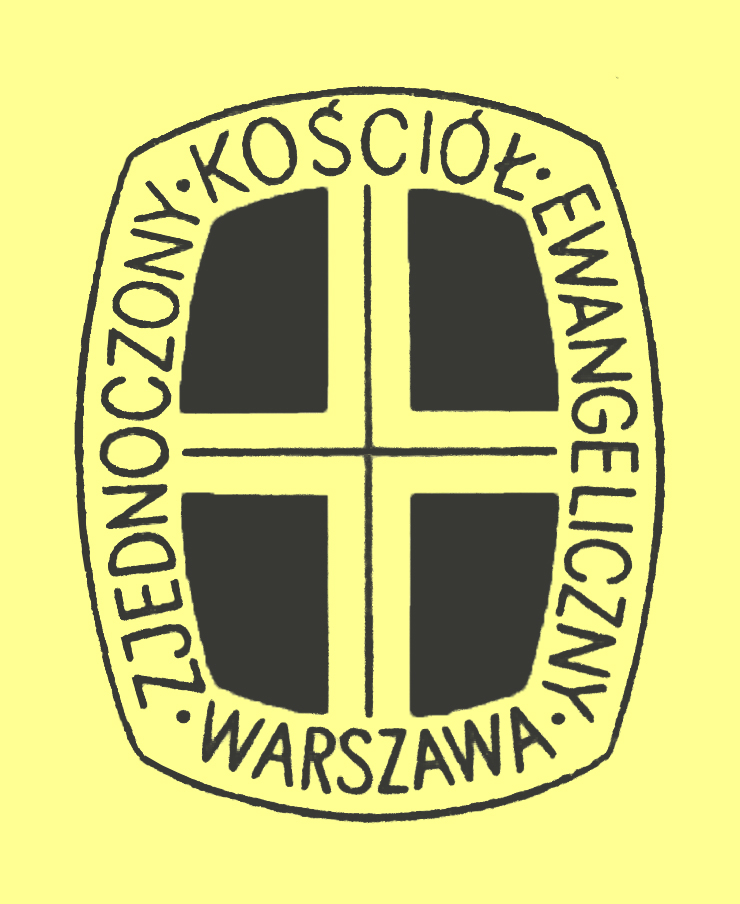
- Type: Congregationalism; Synod
- Classification: Christianity
- Theology: Protestantism; Evangelicalism
- Region: Polish People's Republic
- Founder: Interim Committee of the Union of Evangelical Churches in Poland
- Origin: May 24–26, 1947; Ustroń
- Defunct: May 22, 1987; Warsaw
- Number of followers: 17,100
- Places of worship: 268

The United Evangelical Church of the Polish People's Republic was a religious organization existing from 1947 to 1988, comprising five Polish Protestant communities characterized by evangelical piety and the practice of baptizing only those who were conscious of their faith. Two of them had a Pentecostal character. During the Polish People's Republic period, it was the largest evangelical church in Poland – the second largest denomination of this profile at the time was the Baptist Christian Church of the Republic of Poland. Since 1967, the church's headquarters had been located at Zagórna Street in Warsaw. Until 1953, the church was a federation, within which each group retained its distinctiveness; in 1953, these distinctions were abolished. In 1981, the United Evangelical Church returned to a federative structure.

The first post-war unification initiatives among evangelical Christians in Poland emerged as early as 1945 when the Baptist Christian Church of the Republic of Poland was founded, bringing together various strands, but within the next two years, all groups withdrew from it, leaving only the Baptists. Soon after, a new unification initiative emerged, resulting in the establishment of the United Evangelical Church in 1947. Initially, three churches belonged to it, and from 1953, five. In 1956, some of the former Union of Evangelical Christians' congregations attempted to leave the United Evangelical Church and appealed to the authorities to legalize their association. The authorities responded with repression, and the congregations were forced to return to the United Evangelical Church. The "Lublin group" resisted the longest, until the late 1960s. Until 1975, Free Christians (Plymouth Brethren) dominated, and from 1981, Pentecostals. The change in the political situation after 1980 allowed the individual confessions to become subjects within one church. In 1981, a group of Free Christians left, forming a separate religious association called the Church of Free Christians of the Polish People's Republic. From then on, the United Evangelical Church encompassed four communities. In 1987, at the church's last synod, it was decided to dissolve the United Evangelical Church. Towards the end of its existence, it exceeded 17,000 believers, with the largest numerical growth occurring in the 1980s. As a result of its dissolution, four separate churches were formed: the Church of Christians of the Evangelical Faith in the Republic of Poland, the Church of Evangelical Christians, the Church of Christ Congregations, and the Pentecostal Church in Poland.

The basic unit in the United Evangelical Church was an autonomous congregation with legal personality. The congregation had the right to decide on the admission or exclusion of its own members. Among the Church's major achievements were the construction of a central chapel in Warsaw, the establishment of a Home for the Elderly in Ostróda, and publishing activities, including the publication of the monthly magazine Chrześcijanin. The United Evangelical Church was a member of the Polish Ecumenical Council.

== History ==
=== First unification initiatives ===
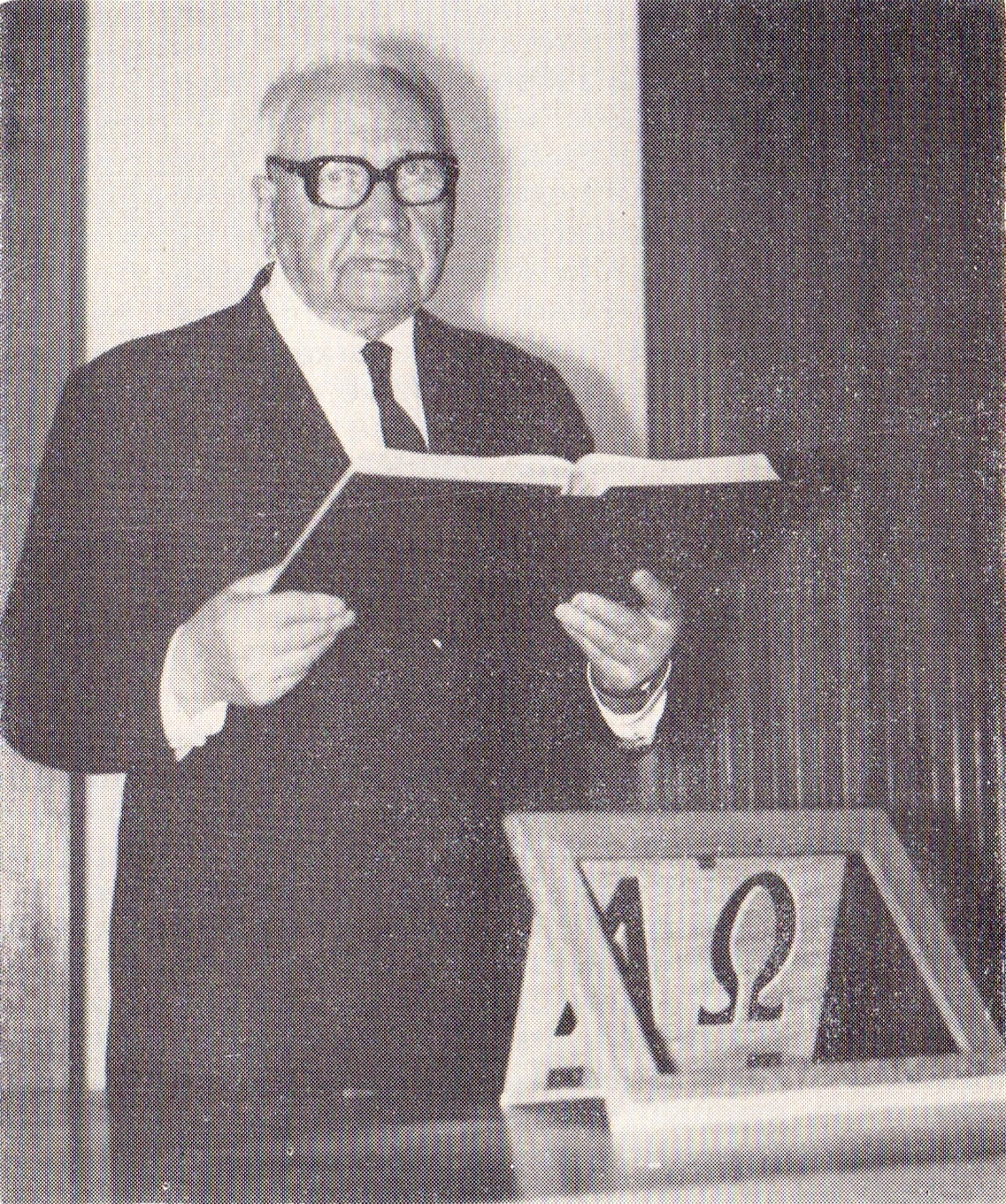
Stanisław Krakiewicz in the central chapel (1974)

In the Evangelical-Baptist communities in Polish territories, the first unification idea emerged after the end of the Polish-Bolshevik War and concerned the Union of Slavic Baptist Congregations and the Union of Evangelical Christians. In 1923, the Evangelical Christian and Baptist Union in Poland was established in Brest, but after two years, due to different attitudes towards military service, the Baptists decided to pursue independent activities.

The unification ideas resurfaced during World War II and were relevant immediately after its end. The biblical motto that they may all be one (John 17:21) was often cited. A significant obstacle to realizing this idea was the ambitions of leaders of individual groups.

After World War II, the first unification initiative came from the Baptists, at that time the largest Evangelical group in Poland. As a result, in May 1945, a religious union was formed, bringing together several Evangelical groups with similar doctrines under the name Polish Church of Christian Baptists. Pentecostals did not join this church. The union was recognized by the state authorities in May 1946. Already in January 1946 (before its legal situation was regulated), a group of Evangelical Christians led by Ludwik Szenderowski withdrew from it, and in November 1946, the Church Union of Christ with Jerzy Sacewicz as president also withdrew. Konstanty Jaroszewicz, who visited Poland in 1946, contributed to the separation of the Christ group, encouraged the leaders of the Church of Christ to break away from the Baptist Christian Church and promised them financial assistance. The Free Christians withdrew in June 1947. The decision to withdraw was influenced, among other things, by a personal conflict between Free Christian Józef Mrózek and Baptist Emil Jeske. Each of them wanted to be the leader for the Silesian region. Mrózek convened a conference for Free Christians in Chorzów, where the decision to withdraw from the Polish Church of Evangelical Christian Baptists was made. Only the Baptists remained in the union, retaining their legalization and name. Soon after, the term "Evangelical" was removed from the name, thus creating the name Polish Church of Christian Baptists. Another reason for the dissolution of this church was the numerical dominance of the Baptists. The number of Baptists at that time was about 2,000 members, while the remaining groups had a total of 1,500 members. (Note: At the time, the numbers fluctuated – Germans were leaving, repatriates from the USSR arrived, and as a result, statistics from this period are very uncertain.)

Still, during the existence of the Polish Church of Evangelical Christian Baptists, a competing unification initiative emerged. In November 1946, a conference of five Evangelical communities was held in Ustroń. The Baptists did not participate. On 16 February 1947, the Temporary Committee of the Union of Evangelical Churches in Poland was established. It included the Union of Evangelical Christians, the Union of Evangelical Faith Christians, the Church Union of Christ, the Free Christian Union (still part of the Polish Church of Evangelical Christian Baptists), and the Union of Steadfast Christians. Stanisław Krakiewicz became its president. Shortly thereafter, the Church Union and the Evangelical Faith Union withdrew from the committee's work.

From 24 to 26 May 1947, Krakiewicz and Szenderowski organized the "Brotherly Conference" in Ustroń. The Baptists were invited to the conference several times but declined, (Note: At the conference in Białystok in early 1947, the Baptists declared that they were not interested in joining the structures of the newly formed church due to the accession proposed by the Union of Evangelical Faith Christians. The official reason for the refusal was that the Baptists had a longer history with their own tradition, were associated with Baptist groups worldwide, and had no intention of giving that up.) as did the Church Union of Christ and the Evangelical Faith Union due to negative experiences with the previous cooperation with the union. As a result, a federation of only three unions was formed under the name United Evangelical Church. On 23 June 1947, at the last meeting of the Polish Church of Evangelical Christian Baptists, Krakiewicz informed the Baptists about the establishment of the new church and the withdrawal of Free Christians from the Polish Church of Evangelical Christian Baptists. He shifted the responsibility for creating the new church onto his "brothers". Krakiewicz served as secretary in the Polish Church of Evangelical Christian Baptists and became president in the United Evangelical Church. (Note: According to Tomaszewski (2009, p. 27), the surviving correspondence testifies to the negative attitude of Krakiewicz and Szenderowski towards cooperation with the Baptists.)

Obtaining legalization became a top priority for the newly established church. On 15 October 1947, the statutes of the United Evangelical Church were submitted to the authorities. The Ministry of Public Security ordered changes to certain provisions of the statute concerning cooperation with foreign religious communities. Despite making amendments and submitting the necessary documents in September 1948, the legalization process was not completed until July 1959. Shortly after the establishment of the United Evangelical Church, it joined the Polish Ecumenical Council. Membership in the council was understood as cooperation "in administrative terms" rather than "spiritual or doctrinal".

=== Arrests of clergymen ===
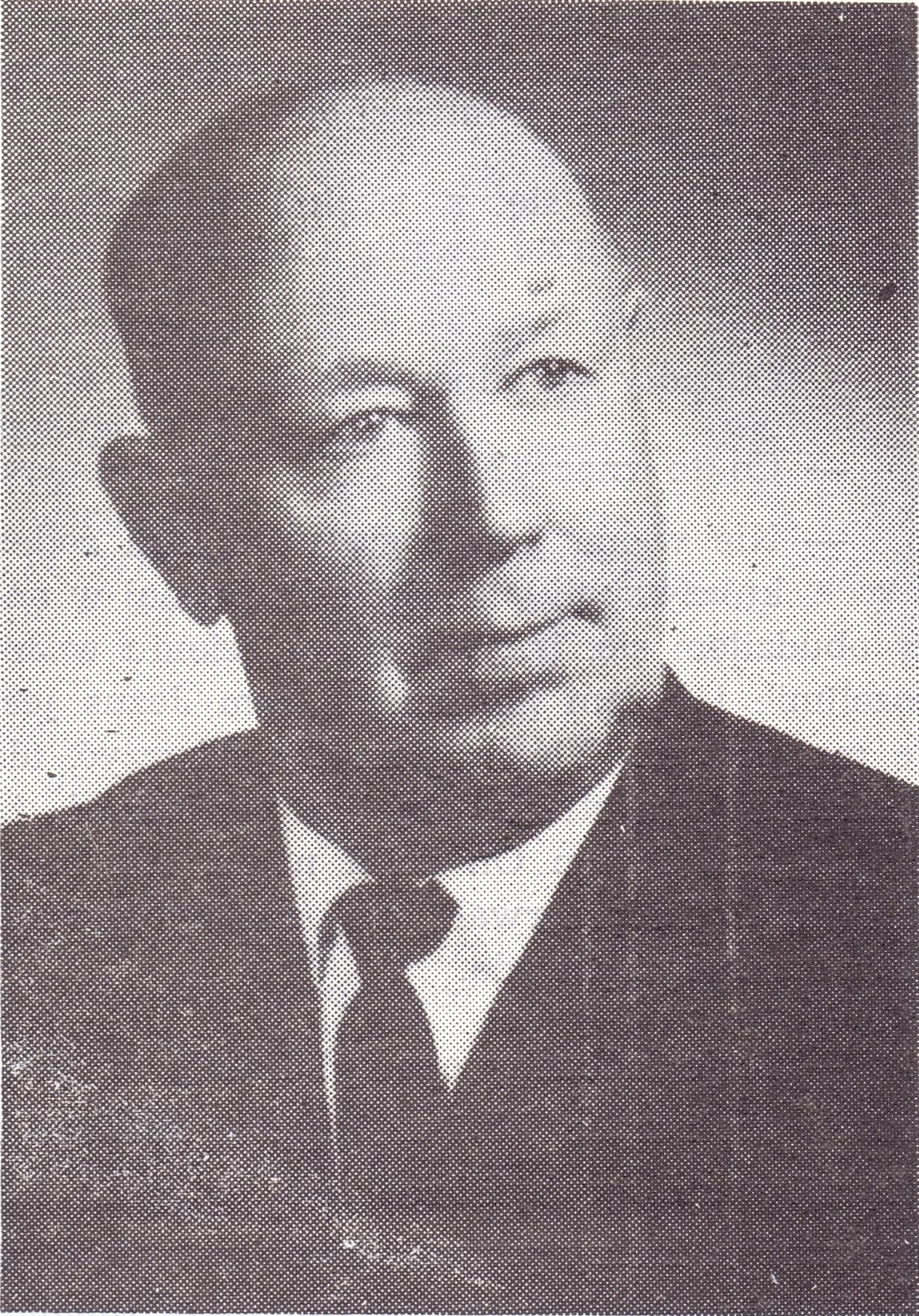
Teodor Maksymowicz

Despite the fact that the unification idea was supported by the state authorities, the church was denied legalization, and its activists were persecuted. Already at the turn of 1947 and 1948, information about the church's activists began to be collected. On the night of 19 to 20 September 1950, the church leaders were arrested by the Security Office, and all the religious facilities belonging to the church were closed. As a result of this action, 199 people from Evangelical-Baptist Churches (i.e., United Evangelical Church, Church of Christians of the Evangelical Faith, and Church Union of Christ) were arrested. Not only church clergy but also particularly active believers were arrested. Some chapels, literature, hymnals, and church equipment were confiscated. The majority of the property confiscated as a result of this action was never returned to its owners.

The activists of these "sects" were alleged to have established contacts "with their operational centers in the United States and Sweden" and were portrayed as "spies of Anglo-American imperialism". They were accused of conducting a broad anti-Soviet campaign, criticizing the people's power and agricultural cooperatives. Two individuals most involved in this action were pointed out – Władysław Kołodziej and Teodor Maksymowicz. The Security Office intended to prepare a show trial. Despite the use of torture in prisons and intimidation, the clergy did not confess to the charges against them.

Most of the arrested were released after several days or weeks of detention, some were released after several months, while "evidence" was gathered against others. Everyone signed a statement of no claims against the Security Office before leaving custody. Sixteen people were sentenced to prison. Stanisław Krakiewicz was detained on charges of conducting "intelligence work" and sentenced for "anti-state activity". Ludwik Szenderowski was sentenced to 9 years in prison due to extensive contacts with fellow believers from the United States. This temporarily halted the church's activities for several months. In the spring of 1951, religious life began to return to the repressed "sects". Szenderowski was the last to be released, being pardoned in 1955.

The authorities assumed that the arrests would weaken, or perhaps even lead to the elimination of Evangelical Christianity in Poland.

=== Five organizations in one ===
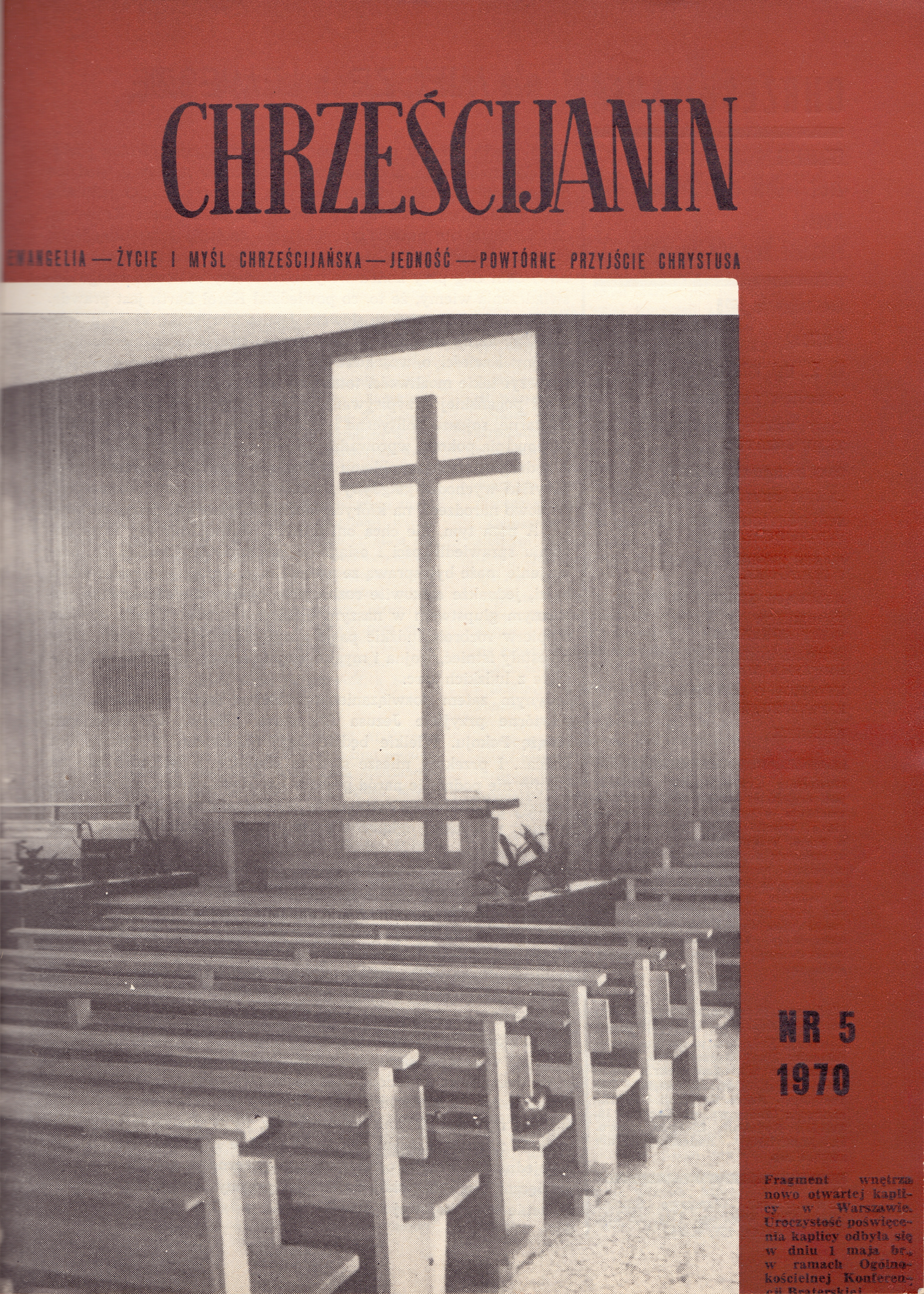
Monthly magazine Chrześcijanin. On the cover, the interior of the newly built central chapel of the church

In 1952, the state authorities, inspired by Soviet solutions, recognized that the increase in the number of religious organizations that were not materially different was an undesirable phenomenon. It was decided to merge related factions for easier supervision and to detach them from American support. As a result of pressure from the authorities, consultative conferences were held in 1952 and 1953 aimed at incorporating two further religious unions into the United Evangelical Church: the Union of Christ Churches and the Union of Evangelical Christian Faith. This occurred at the First Synod of the United Evangelical Church on 4 June 1953. At this synod, the church council and the council's presidency with President Stanisław Krakiewicz were elected. It was acknowledged that the federative system was ineffective, and the unions within the United Evangelical Church were dissolved. A statute was adopted, according to which the decisions of synods were binding on everyone. Henceforth, activities were conducted in a new organizational form, and the United Evangelical Church no longer had a federative character.

The authorities assumed that it would be easier to control a single religious union than each separately. They also wanted the activities of the congregations in the field to take place in permanent locations, intended to eliminate "communalism" practiced by the unaffiliated, and aimed to incorporate all unregistered "evangelical believers" into the United Evangelical Church. Over time, the authorities gained another advantage. The factions within the United Evangelical Church had a similar doctrine but differed in some points. As a result, a "fighting within" church emerged, and the coexistence of these denominations within one body often led to disputes. The authorities also wanted to "incorporate the Baptist Church, whose leadership still leaned towards Baptist centers abroad", into the United Evangelical Church.

In late 1954, the Church Council made efforts to establish closer cooperation with the Polish Baptist Christian Church. Joint meetings were proposed. The Supreme Council of the Polish Baptist Christian Church supported the idea of cooperation but emphasized that the past should be clarified first, as they remained faithful to the agreements jointly adopted at the synod of the common church in 1945. It is possible that this initiative from the United Evangelical Church was inspired by the Office for Religious Affairs, which supported the idea of merging all Evangelical churches. However, the change in the political situation meant that these plans were never realized. In 1968, the authorities apparently abandoned the idea of merging the Polish Baptist Christian Church and the United Evangelical Church, as they approved a statute for the former.

In 1956, Pentecostals from the former Church of Christians of the Evangelical Faith organized three conferences independent of the United Evangelical Church, planned their own activities for their faction, and sought foreign financial support. The point of contention turned out to be the election of candidates for the Church Council. Pentecostals from the Evangelical Christian Faith faction obtained 11 out of 30 mandates. The incumbent Church Council invalidated the results of these elections. In response, Pentecostals decided to withdraw from the United Evangelical Church, and an application was submitted to the Office for Religious Affairs for the registration of the Church of Evangelical Christian Faith. Teodor Maksymowicz was elected president. The authorities prohibited the separatists from conducting activities outside the United Evangelical Church and from holding clerical positions. The most severe method of combating the separatists turned out to be the issue of using their own chapels. By 1961, most congregations had returned to the United Evangelical Church. Outside the church remained congregations in the Lublin Voivodeship (the so-called "Lublin group"), resisting state authorities until the late 1960s. Kazimierz Czepieluk (1905–1969) acted outside the United Evangelical Church until the end of his life. Walenty Dawidow founded the Christ Church in Poland. Independently, Bolesław Dawidow, the founder of the future Church of God in Christ, operated.

Under the conditions of support for the United Evangelical Church and the suppression of separatists, the Office for Religious Affairs decided to approve the United Evangelical Church Statute. The church statute was adopted at the synod in 1959, and on 31 July 1959, it was approved by the Office for Religious Affairs (decision no. III. 11/10/59). Thus, the registration of the United Evangelical Church was completed. The statute defined the Church as "autonomous and independent of any spiritual or secular authority". The executive body was the Church Council, and the supervisory body was the Supervisory Commission. The basic unit was the congregation, which according to the statute was autonomous and had legal personality; its members could be converted and baptized individuals. The congregation had the right to exclude any person leading a lifestyle inconsistent with biblical standards.

=== Foreign contacts ===
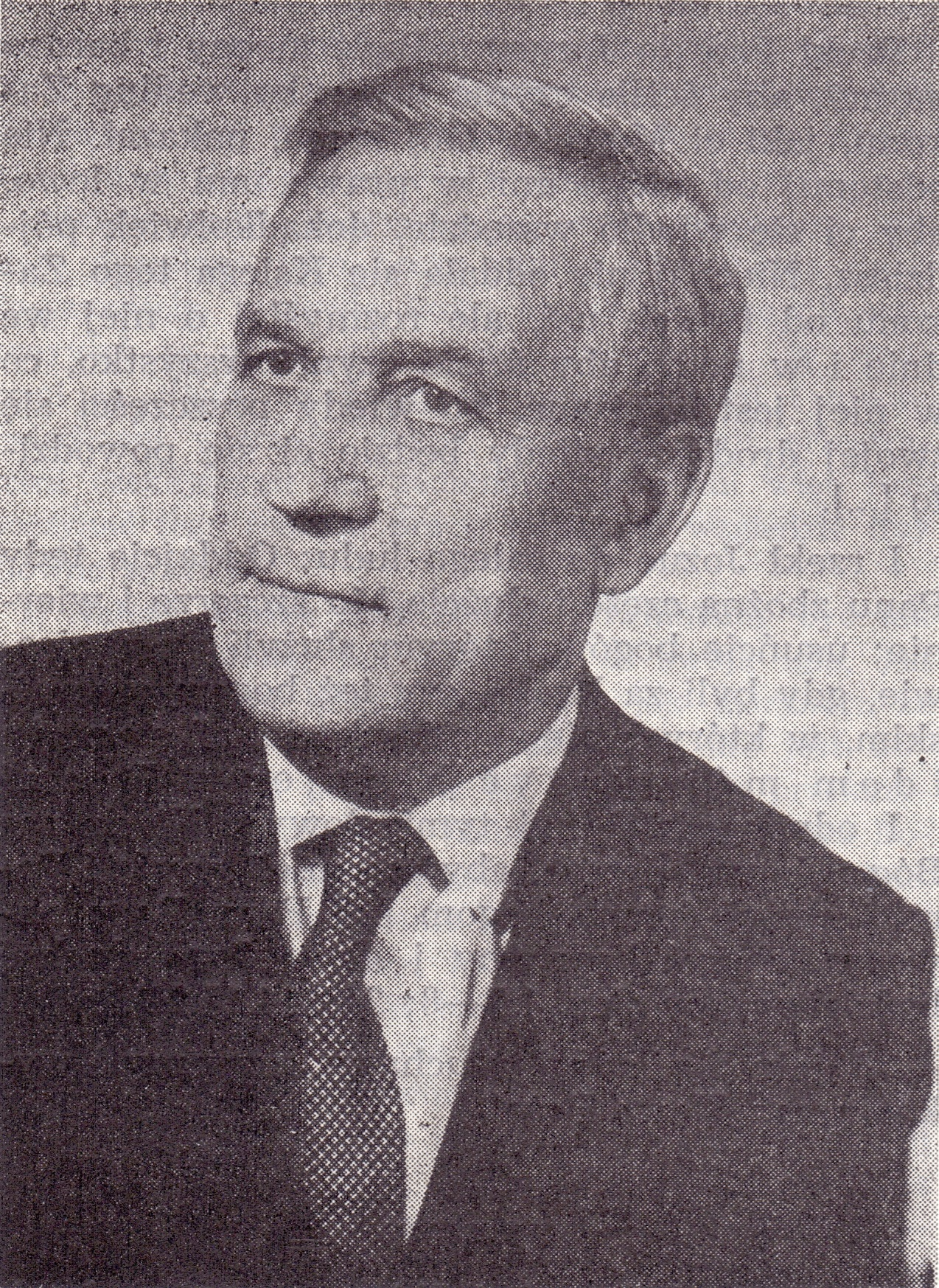
Konstanty Sacewicz, president of the United Evangelical Church from 1975 to 1981

In 1955, the authorities allowed the resumption of foreign contacts, although they still perceived them as an attempt to subordinate to foreign church centers. Pentecostals were primarily interested in maintaining contacts. After the detachment of the "separatists" in 1956 who remained within the structures of the United Evangelical Church, the authorities treated them as loyal citizens of the Polish People's Republic. Travel abroad was made difficult for the "separatists", while for clergy remaining in the United Evangelical Church, the Ministry of Internal Affairs even expedited formalities.

After the 1968 Polish political crisis, the surveillance of the United Evangelical Church clergy by the security service intensified. The main reason for this was the numerous visits by fellow believers from abroad. Concerned that guests were speaking in congregations, teaching at youth courses, gatherings, and camps, the authorities decided to restrict visits to Poland for foreign guests. The United Evangelical Church Presidium implemented the authorities' recommendations regarding guests. Congregants were instructed to report on every foreigner attending services. During this period, representatives of the Pentecostal movement from the US and Western Europe showed great activity. They eagerly participated in services and vividly described the persecution of Pentecostals upon their return to their countries, both by communist authorities and by the United Evangelical Church Presidium. The matter seemed serious enough to the authorities that on 11 December 1970, a meeting was held between the Church Presidium and representatives of the Office for Religious Affairs. During the meeting, Tadeusz Dusik, the director for non-Catholic religious affairs, accused: Foreign centers are increasingly actively working to transform the United Evangelical Church into their outpost in the territory of the Polish People's Republic.

Those clergy who maintained foreign contacts were suspected. However, the actions of the state authorities in this regard were not consistent, and often visits by those whose activities were previously perceived as leading to separatism within the United Evangelical Church were permitted.

Pressure from the authorities gradually diminished, and during times of economic difficulty, guests were eagerly invited. In the second half of the 1970s, the authorities began to favor numerous visits by Protestants from the West to Poland. In 1984, permission was granted to organize a youth convention in Warsaw, which was attended by over a thousand people. The main speaker was a foreign guest. The following year, approximately 4,000 people attended another convention. In 1985, the situation further relaxed. Political and religious authorities were less interested in the relatively small religious association.

=== Headquarters ===
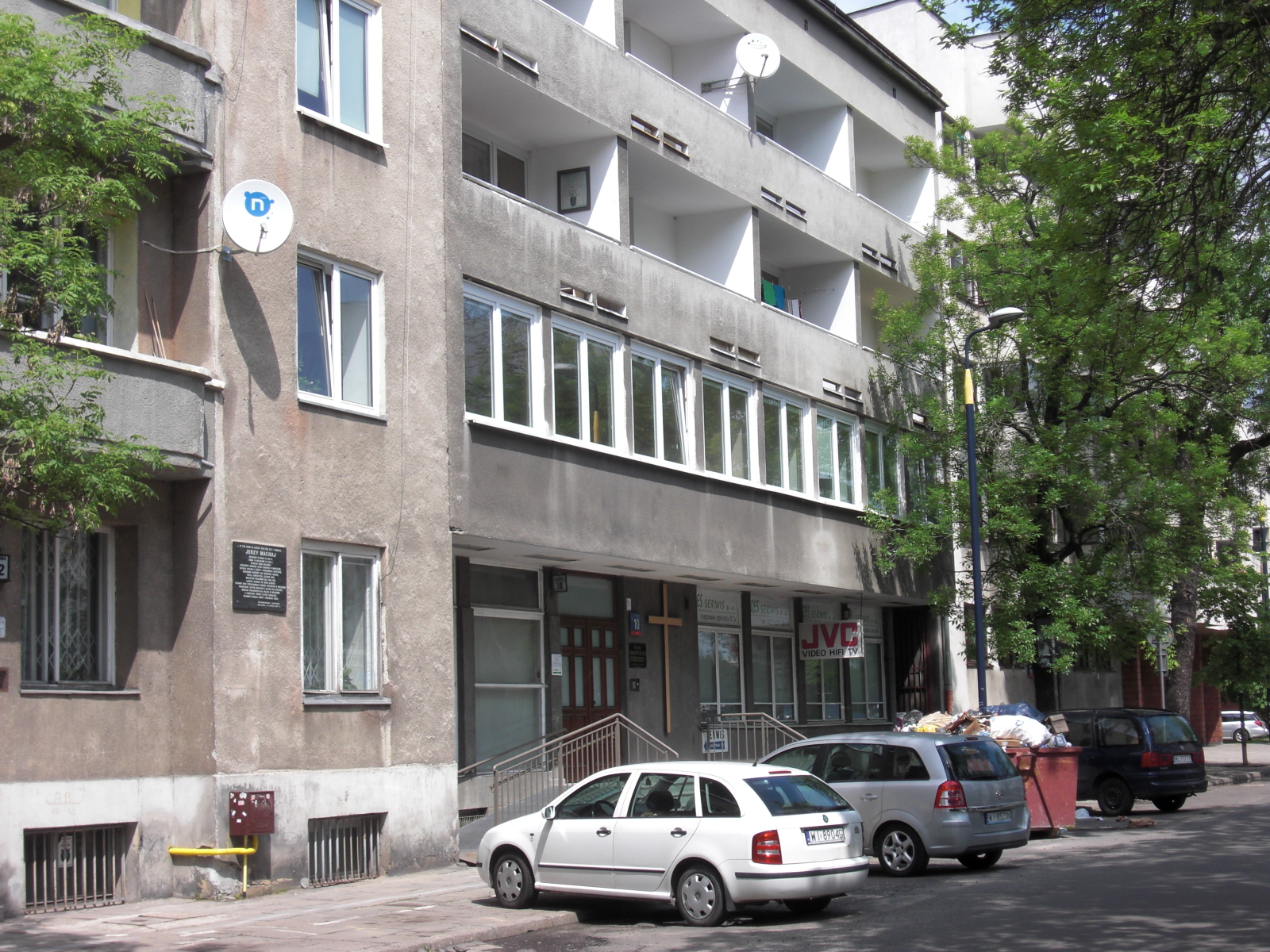
10 Zagórna Street in Warsaw. From 1967 to 1987 it housed the headquarters of the United Evangelical Church

Already in 1957, the United Evangelical Church Council Presidium appealed to the authorities for the location and permission to build a religious facility. The Office for Religious Affairs supported the idea of constructing the "United Evangelical Church Central". Initially, the Chief Architect of Warsaw was asked if there was a possibility of developing the courtyard at 114 Puławska Street. Subsequently, a plot at 25 Waliców Street was allocated, which the United Evangelical Church did not utilize due to a lack of funds, so it was taken over by the Baptists. On 25 January 1962, a plot of land at 10 Zagórna Street was awarded. It was decided to construct a three-story building with a volume of 6,000 m^{3}. Appeals for financial support were made to congregations and also to "brothers" from abroad. One of the benefactors was Oral Roberts, who donated $1,200. (Note: The money went to the Nursing Home in Ostróda even before construction began (Krakiewicz (1970a, p. 28)).)

The facility was built between 1965 and 1970, consisting of office spaces and two chapels. In the first stage, from June 1965 to the fall of 1967, the administrative building was erected, which was put into use on 10 December 1967, and became the residence of the Church's Presidium. The church's secretariat, the editorial office of Chrześcijanin, the United Evangelical Church publishing house, and the Głos Ewangelii radio were all housed here. In the second stage, from May 1968 to the spring of 1970, a chapel for the central congregation was built. (Note: Before that, the First Warsaw United Evangelical Church had a chapel on Jerozolimska Avenue. The authorities allowed the construction of a chapel on Zagórna Street on condition that the chapel on Jerozolimska Avenue be relinquished (Krakiewicz (1970a, p. 29)).) The grand opening took place on 1 May 1970. During the opening, President Krakiewicz outlined the history of the United Evangelical Church, focusing on its achievements. He informed those gathered that in 1947, the United Evangelical Church had 30 congregations, in 1953 – 70 congregations, and by May 1970, it had grown to 96 congregations and over 100 branches, with a total of 8,000 followers.

=== President Krakiewicz ===
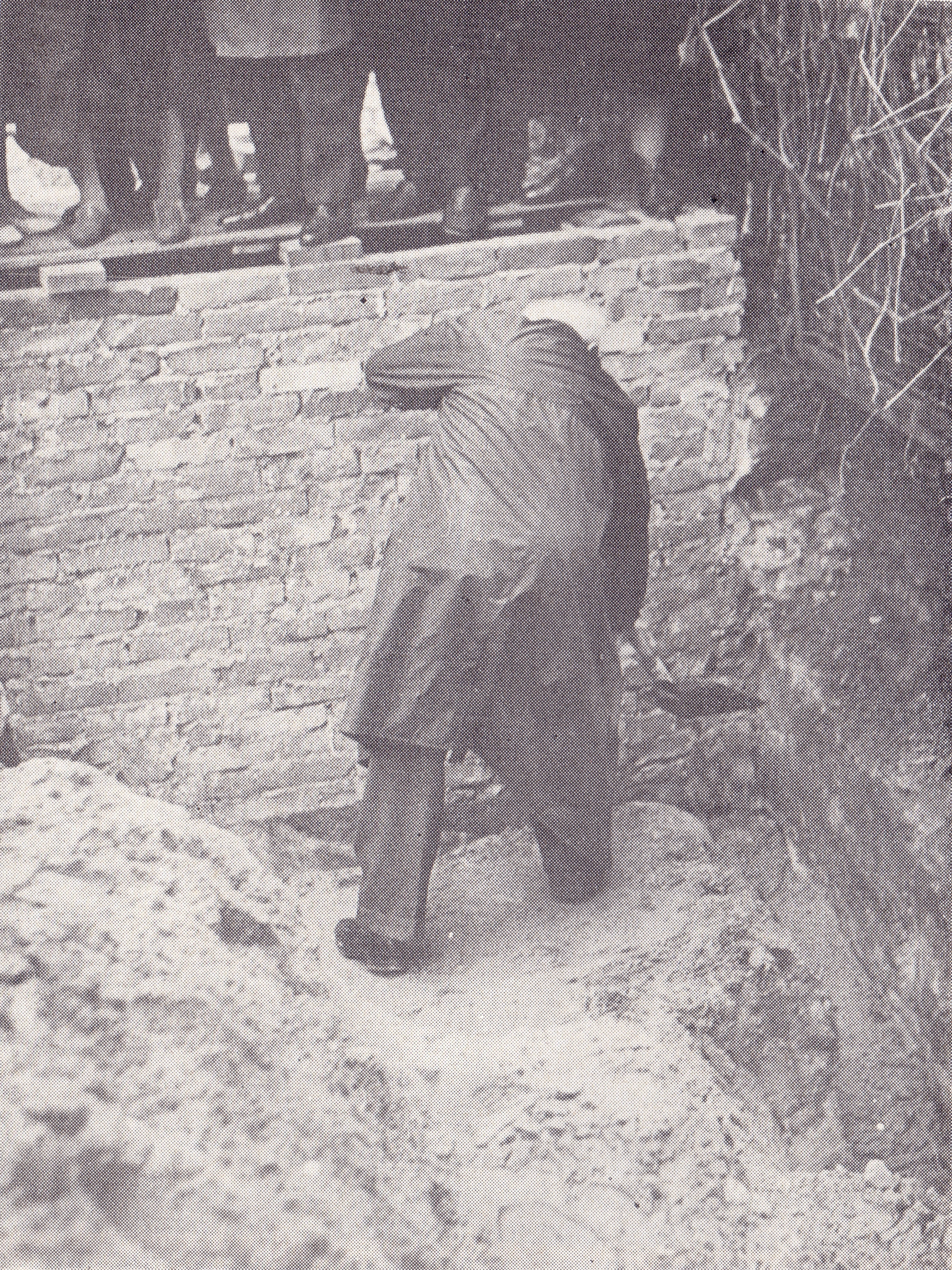
Krakiewicz lays foundation stone for central chapel

President Krakiewicz repeatedly violated the existing statute of the United Evangelical Church. Under his leadership, the elections for the Presidium in 1965 and 1968 were conducted in a manner inconsistent with the prevailing law. Similarly, on18 and 19 February 1972, during the Church Council meeting, Krakiewicz and his secretary presented their own proposal to dismiss the current regional presbyters and appoint new ones. The purpose of these changes was to prevent representatives of the Pentecostal churches from participating.

For the Department of Religious Affairs, these changes were justified by "higher necessity", and there were no courageous individuals within the church to oppose them. Krakiewicz also allowed himself a degree of autonomy regarding religious authorities, no longer informing them of the affiliation of each candidate but presenting them in alphabetical order instead. He interfered in the internal affairs of individual factions. In the autumn of 1970, he refused to authorize a fraternal meeting in Koszalin, where foreign guests were expected to attend (despite the ban, the meeting still took place). At subsequent synods of the church, he consistently stated that "he would accept the position of President of the Council if the Brethren entrusted him with this mandate". However, there was no opposition that could threaten his influence, and the elections to the Presidium were coordinated with the authorities (in 1971, the candidacy of Kazimierz Muranty for secretary had the support of the authorities).

Over time, there was growing resistance to Krakiewicz's actions. In January 1975, representatives of all factions held consultative meetings aimed at eliminating Krakiewicz from the council's Presidium on charges of unchristian behavior. Only representatives of the Free Christians opposed this, to which Krakiewicz belonged. It was agreed that Konstanty Sacewicz would be elected president at the VIII Synod of the United Evangelical Church. Stanisław Krakiewicz sought help from religious authorities, assuring them of his loyalty and patriotism. At the same time, he criticized some United Evangelical Church activists, especially the Pentecostals, accusing them of being "insubordinate, linked to the West, unpatriotic", and calling them "untrue Poles". However, religious and political authorities believed that the president should be changed, considering Krakiewicz's position too weak and his personality too conflict-ridden. Krakiewicz was then 83 years old, so perhaps it was believed that he had served his purpose.

At the VIII Synod, a new president was elected, who declared himself a proponent of equal rights for all factions. Along with Krakiewicz, all regional leaders were also dismissed. Krakiewicz's departure marked the end of a stage in the United Evangelical Church's activities that had been characterized by significant compliance with the authorities.

=== More freedom ===
President Sacewicz adhered to the church's statute and served for two terms. The balance of power within the United Evangelical Church shifted to the disadvantage of the Free Christian faction. Until 1975, they managed all church agendas, but now other factions also had their representatives in church matters. The Free Christians claimed they were discriminated against and sought the church's reorganization.

Starting from 1975, the authorities' attitude towards the United Evangelical Church became more reconciliatory. Since its establishment, the authorities ensured that any emerging separatism within it was swiftly eliminated. Maintaining organizational coherence within the United Evangelical Church became increasingly complicated over time. In October 1974, the United Evangelical Church Council first applied to the Department of Religious Affairs for permission to register a second congregation in Szczecin. After a year, the provincial authorities in Szczecin reversed their previous negative decision. Another concession occurred in Sosnowiec. In July 1974, the provincial authorities in Katowice refused to register a branch of the Katowice congregation in Sosnowiec to "prevent the fragmentation of the United Evangelical Church". President Sacewicz's efforts led to a change in the decision. However, when the church wanted to purchase a building for a new congregation, the authorities refused to allow the building to become the property of the Sosnowiec congregation but rather insisted it belong to the United Evangelical Church as a whole. This was a new way for the authorities to ensure the unity of the United Evangelical Church. The same procedure applied when the United Evangelical Church Council requested permission to acquire property in Janowice Wielkie for the congregation in Legnica; the Department of Religious Affairs decided that the property should belong to the church, not the congregation. Henceforth, all donations to the church were subject to the same procedure.

=== From 1981 to 1987 ===
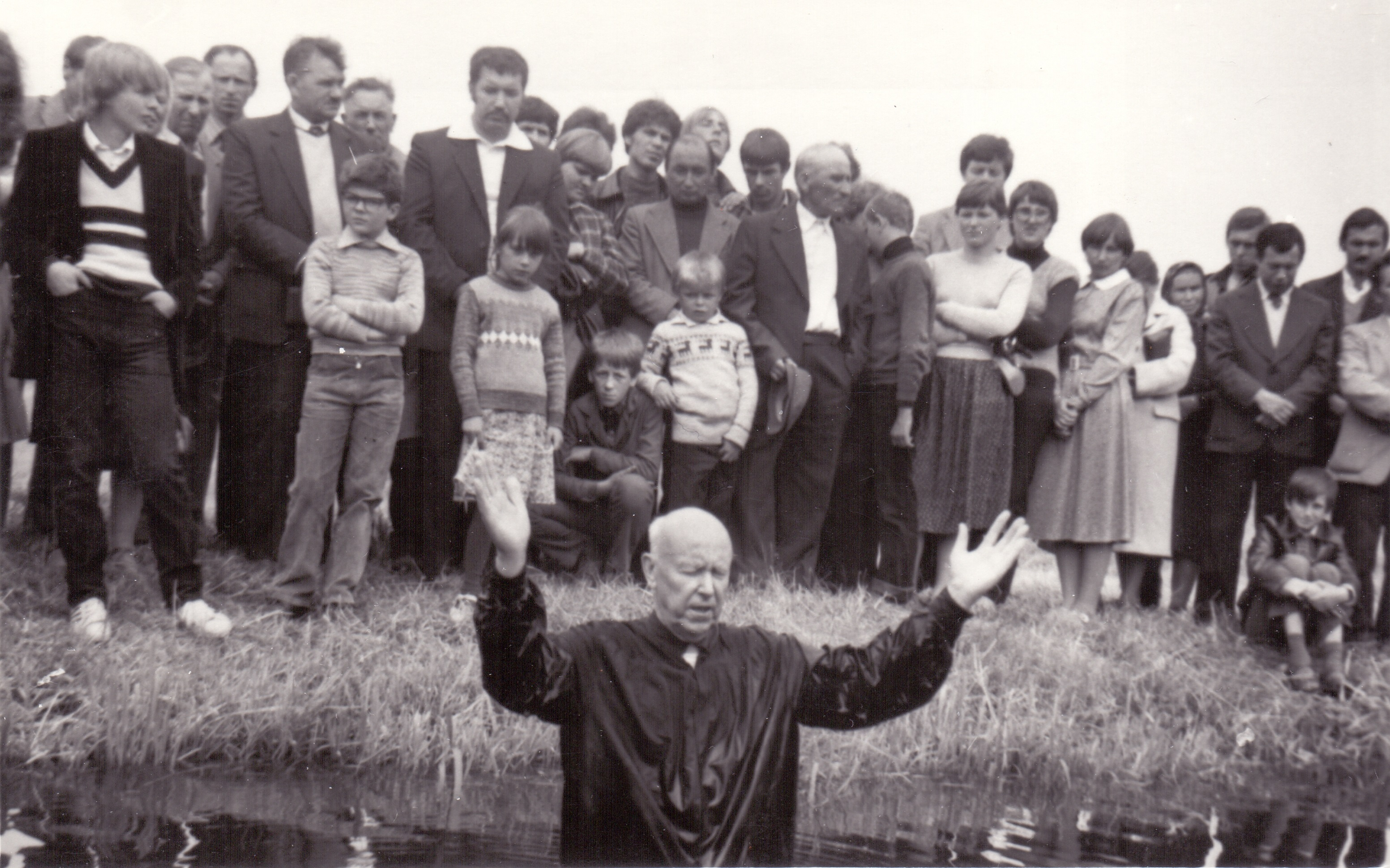
Baptism in Dubicze Cerkiewne, Teodor Maksymowicz (20 June 1982)

The "unchristian attitude" of Krakiewicz resulted in the reluctance of other factions towards the Free Christians. The removal of Krakiewicz, their representative, and the unresolved issue in the First Warsaw Congregation (Note: On 23 March 1975, elections to the Congregational Council were held in the First Warsaw Congregation. The Church Council Presidium deemed these elections biased, contrary to the applicable statute, and did not approve their outcome. At the same time, an appeal was made to Krakiewicz, the head of the congregation, and the remaining members of the Congregational Council not to tarnish their reputation (Tomaszewski (2009, p. 315)).) were reasons for growing dissatisfaction among the Free Christians. (Note: On 8 March 1980, during a meeting of the Church Council, the "Krakiewicz case" and the situation of the First Warsaw Congregation were discussed. Krakiewicz was blamed for all the wrongdoing in the church. The Free Christians were unwilling to accept that Krakiewicz bore the main responsibility (Tomaszewski (2009, p. 340)).) Initially, they conducted exploratory discussions with the Polish Baptist Christian Church about the possibility of accession. The United Evangelical Church Presidium reprimanded the participants of this meeting. In response, the Free Christians accused the Church's Presidium of an ongoing "takeover action of congregations by the Pentecostal movement", citing examples of "taken over" or marginalized congregations. They demanded greater freedom for individual factions, disliked the dictates of the Presidium, and called for the church's reorganization. Since the conditions set were not met, on 30 December 1980, a letter was sent to the Department of Religious Affairs requesting registration. The Free Christians Church was registered on 14 May 1981. The Organizational Committee of the Free Christians Church presented a list of 21 congregations to the authorities, but two congregations – in Bierdziej and Wodzisław Śląski – broke away and remained within the United Evangelical Church structures. As a result, there were 19 congregations. The registration of the Free Christians Church marked a departure from the authorities' previous policy towards Evangelical-Baptist communities. Shortly thereafter, other evangelical groups were also registered. (Note: In 1981, the Protestant Community of the Bieszczady region was also registered; in 1982, the Christ Church was registered; in 1986, the Christian Pentecostal Community was registered; in 1987, the Evangelical Brotherhood Association was registered; in 1988, the Church of God in Christ, the Church of Christ's Assemblies, the Pentecostal Church, the Church of Evangelical Christians, and the Disciples of the Holy Spirit were registered (Mironczuk (2006, p. 124)).) As of 31 December 1980, the United Evangelical Church had 124 congregations, 120 branches, and 10,070 believers. (Note: By comparison, on 31 December 1979, the church had 123 churches, 115 outposts and 8,960 believers (Tomaszewski (2009, p. 330)).)

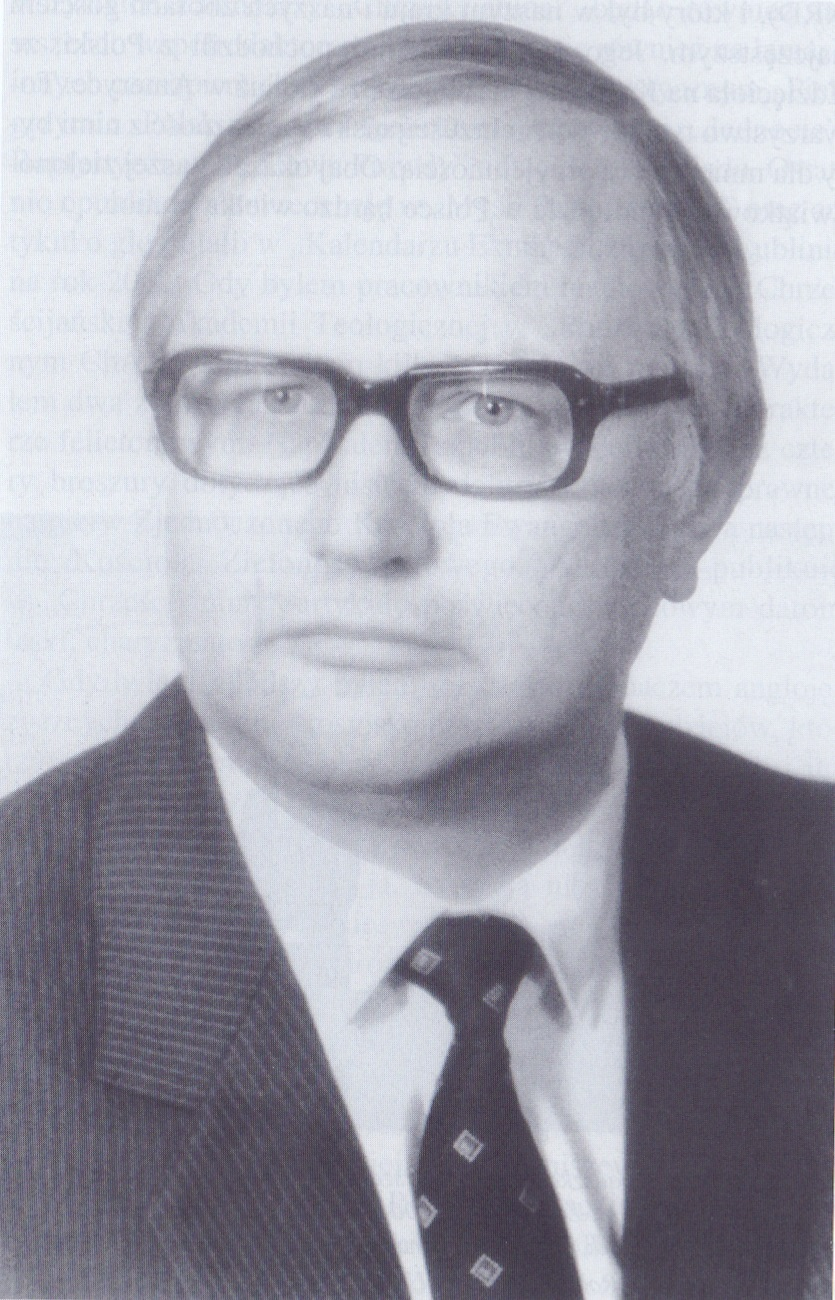
Edward Czajko

On 28 November 1981, at the X United Evangelical Church Synod, Jan Guńka, on behalf of the Union of Steadfast Christians, submitted a motion for the complete independence of all denominations. During the vote, 83 delegates spoke in favor of independence, 89 for remaining in the United Evangelical Church, 1 vote was invalid, and 7 delegates abstained. Edward Czajko was elected President of the Church Council and served in this capacity until 1988. After the departure of the Free Christians, the Pentecostals played a leading role in the United Evangelical Church, as they had the majority and could almost pass anything at the synod.

The United Evangelical Church adopted a new statute and reorganized itself. According to the new statute, the church was a federation of factions. New terminology was introduced, such as "pastor", instead of the previous "superior". From 1981 to 1984, there was intensive development of church construction. Several chapels were completed in Sobótka, Kraków, Lwówek Śląski, Hajnówka, and construction continued in Ustroń, Poznań, Świnoujście, Gubin, with new construction starting in Lublin, Wrocław, Warsaw, Łódź, Bielsko Podlaskie, Poznań, Bydgoszcz, Włocławek, Stargard. New places of worship were obtained, and many chapels were renovated. There was also an unnoticed increase in the number of church followers.

At the XI Synod, J. Tomczyk submitted a proposal for the United Evangelical Church to withdraw from the Polish Ecumenical Council. Czajko appealed for restraint and for dealing with the matter "in accordance with the wisdom of God". Antoni Pliński proposed that the Church Council send surveys to the congregations to obtain opinions on Polish Ecumenical Council membership. Czajko supported Pliński's proposal and suggested refraining from making resolutions on the matter. Tomczyk withdrew his proposal.

The cooperation between individual groups continued to be less than ideal, and it was a turbulent period in Polish history, further influencing the strengthening of emancipatory processes within the church. Another factor contributing to the disintegration of the United Evangelical Church was the decades-long dream of establishing a church with exclusively Pentecostal characteristics.

On 13 September 1986, during a meeting of the Church Council, Michał Hydzik presented a proposal for the "reorganization" of the church towards the independence of individual groups. The proposal was accepted in December at the next council meeting, and the resolution was to be adopted by the upcoming synod. On 22 May 1987, the 12th Synod of the United Evangelical Church passed a resolution on the independence of individual denominations. The Steadfast Christians and the Christians of Evangelical Faith decided to form one church, namely the Pentecostal Church, hence the consideration of selecting three, not four churches:

- Evangelical Christian Church
- Christ's Church
- Pentecostal Church

The proposal was supported by 214 delegates, opposed by 52, with 1 invalid vote. This was above the 2/3 of votes required by the statute. The deliberations of the XII Synod marked the end of the 40-year existence of the United Evangelical Church. Another resolution was the extension of the Church Council and its Presidium until the legalization of the newly established churches.

Immediately after the conclusion of the XII Synod, efforts began to register the new churches. The reorganization envisaged three independent churches. Additionally, Władysław Rudkowski from Lublin decided to establish a separate, fourth community together with the congregations of the Lublin Voivodeship – the Church of Christians of Evangelical Faith.

In 1983, the Poltel Television Film Studio produced a documentary film about the United Evangelical Church titled In the Name of the Holy Spirit. The United Evangelical Church (41 minutes) directed by Mieczysław Siemieński and Maciej Leszczyński, based on a script by Edward Czajko, who served as the substantive consultant for the film.

== Statistics ==
Year	Congregations	Chapels	Clergy	Believers
1950	58	22	58	3,700
1960	138	49	138	6,900
1970	177	97	177	8,100
1980 (Note: Data for 1980 does not include Free Christians.)	240	73	240	8,600
1985	268	115	268	17,151

The largest congregations – data for the year 1985 – were located in the Voivodeships of Bielsko (1,686 followers), Warsaw (1,562), Katowice (1,516), and Szczecin (1,194). As a result of the dissolution of the United Evangelical Church, four churches were established, some of which, however, exited the United Evangelical Church earlier, while others emerged after the dissolution. The development of the churches and denominations that emerged from the United Evangelical Church is illustrated in the table below:

Name of the church	Congregations (1989/2001)	Chapels (1989/1997)	Clergy (1989/2001)	Believers (1989/2001)
Pentecostal Church	102 / 186	101 / 90	174 / 324	10,973 / 20,027
Church of Christians of the Evangelical Faith (Note: In 1995, Church of Christians of the Evangelical Faith stopped reporting its data to the Central Statistical Office.)	13 / x	2 / x	45 / x	4,064 / x
Church of Christ	21 / 16	4 / 5	26 / 28	4,600 / 3,617
Church of Christ Congregations	28 / 25	28 / 31	50 / 75	2,492 / 4,886
Church of Free Christians	32 / 65	32 / 37	x / 62	3,500 / 2,900
Church of Evangelical Christians	53 / 55	53 / 40	46 / 66	2,010 / 3,000
Church of God in Christ	14 / 29	2 / 6	39 / 39	635 / 1,788
Evangelical Brotherhood Association	24 / 26	9 / 6	18 / 24	370 / 360
Union of Steadfast Christians (Note: In 1989, the Union of Steadfast Christians did not yet exist.)	– / 3	– / 1	– / 7	– / 300

According to Zbigniew Pasek's assessment, the breakup of the United Evangelical Church has contributed to the statistical expansion of the evangelical community.

== Main doctrinal principles ==
The main elements of doctrine were contained in the statute of the United Evangelical Church, adopted in 1953. The following principles of faith were outlined in it:

- The infallibility of the Bible
- Faith in the Trinity
- The divine Son of God, Jesus Christ, conceived by the Holy Spirit, born of the Virgin Mary
- The crucifixion of Jesus and His resurrection
- The Ascension of Jesus Christ and His Second Coming
- Baptism with the Holy Spirit
- Eternal life and eternal damnation

From the confession of these principles of faith arises the requirement to fulfill four religious conditions:

- Repentance
- Repentance for sins
- Rebirth in Jesus Christ
- Acknowledgment that the love of God and neighbor is the basis of Christian life

The statute from 1947 did not contain a point about baptism with the Holy Spirit. An unwritten internal agreement stipulated that no differences regarding the interpretation of this baptism should be raised. During joint services, Pentecostals were to avoid manifesting glossolalia, except in situations where the entire congregation consisted of Pentecostals. Despite these agreements, tensions around this issue always existed, and generational turnover influenced the strengthening of the Pentecostal element in the congregations.

Members of the United Evangelical Church called themselves Evangelical Christians. Baptism was performed in the Name of the Father, Son, and Holy Spirit by immersion, understood as a command of the Lord and an act required of every Evangelical Christian, as well as a testimony and pledge of lifelong fidelity to God. Baptism was not treated as a condition for salvation.

== Structure and main activists ==
=== Structure ===
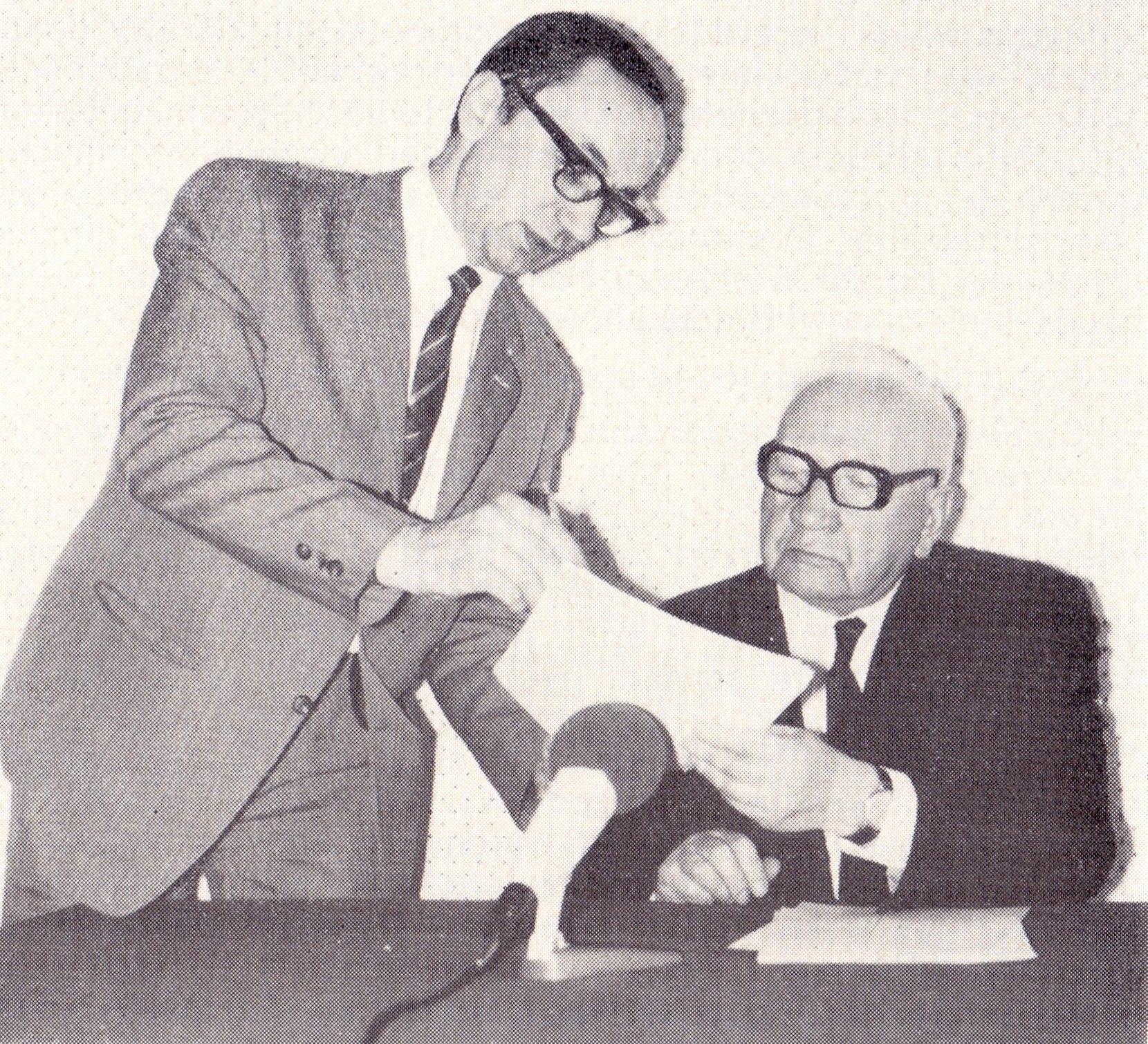
W. Lisieski (left) and S. Krakiewicz (right), during the recording of the Voice of the Gospel from Warsaw broadcast (1974)

The basic unit in the United Evangelical Church was the congregation, which enjoyed broad autonomy and had legal personality. A congregation had to consist of at least 15 people; smaller groups of believers could organize themselves into branches subordinate to one of the nearest congregations. The congregation had the right to decide on the admission or exclusion of its own members. The authority over the congregation was exercised by the assembly of all members (known as the "membership"), the Church Council, the congregation's leader (since 1985 – pastor), and the Audit Committee. It was the responsibility of the congregation's leader to care for the congregation's development, conduct services, or delegate their conduct to their assistants.

Regional presbyters oversaw the congregations.

The highest authority of the church was the synod, composed of delegates from the congregations. The synod reflected the confessional diversity of the various denominations within the United Evangelical Church. Similarly, the executive body, the Church Council, exhibited the denominational diversity within it, with the Presidium of the Church Council.

Until 1953, the church was a federation, within which each denomination retained its distinctiveness; this distinctiveness was abolished in 1953. Since 1981, the United Evangelical Church has returned to a federative structure.

Since 1967, the church's headquarters have been located at Zagórna Street in Warsaw.

=== Presidents ===
- 1947–1949 – Stanisław Krakiewicz
- 1949–1950 – Franciszek Więckiewicz
- 1950–1953 – Karol Śniegoń
- 1953–1975 – Stanisław Krakiewicz
- 1975–1981 – Konstanty Sacewicz
- 1981–1988 – Edward Czajko

=== Members of the Presidium ===
- 1953–1956 – vice presidents: Paweł Bajeński, Józef Czerski, Karol Śniegoń, Franciszek Więckiewicz; secretary: Walenty Dawidow; treasurer: Franciszek Januszewicz
- 1956–1959 – vice presidents: Paweł Bajeński, Michalski, Karol Śniegoń, Sergiusz Waszkiewicz; secretary: Zdzisław Repsz; treasurer: Teodor Maksymowicz
- 1959–1962 – vice presidents: Paweł Bajeński, Michalski, Karol Śniegoń, Franciszek Waszkiewicz; secretary: Józef Mrózek; treasurer: Teodor Maksymowicz
- 1962–1965 – vice presidents: Aleksander Kuc, Konstanty Sacewicz, Karol Śniegoń; secretary: Rapanowicz; treasurer: Teodor Maksymowicz
- 1965–1968 – vice presidents: Aleksander Kuc, Konstanty Sacewicz, Karol Śniegoń, Franciszek Waszkiewicz; secretary: Aleksander Rapanowicz; treasurer: Teodor Maksymowicz; vice secretary: Edward Czajko
- 1968–1971 – vice presidents: Józef Mrózek, Aleksander Kuc, Konstanty Sacewicz, Karol Śniegoń, Franciszek Waszkiewicz; secretary: Edward Czajko; treasurer: Rapanowicz; deputy member: Teodor Maksymowicz
- 1971–1975 – vice presidents: Józef Mrózek, Kominek, Aleksander Kuc (died 1973), Konstanty Sacewicz, Franciszek Waszkiewicz; secretary: Kazimierz Muranty; treasurer: Teodor Maksymowicz
- 1975–1978 – vice presidents: Teodor Maksymowicz, Józef Folwarczny, Kazimierz Najmałowski (died 1978), Kominek; secretary: Kazimierz Muranty; treasurer: Edward Czajko
- 1978–1981 – vice presidents: Antoni Pliński, Folwarczny, Marian Suski, Jan Guńka; secretary: Kazimierz Muranty; treasurer: Edward Czajko
- 1981–1984 – vice president: Marian Suski; secretary: Henryk Ryszard Tomaszewski; treasurer: Siczek; members: Gaweł, Jan Guńka, Jakoniuk, Tadeusz Jarosz
- 1984–1987 – vice president: Edward Lorek; secretary: Henryk Tomaszewski; members: Gaweł, Michał Hydzik, Antoni Pliński, Konstanty Sacewicz

== Activities ==
=== Cult life ===
The United Evangelical Church, as a community bringing together representatives of several Evangelical movements, was a forum where various types of piety were expressed. The spirituality of the Pentecostals and the Brethren had the greatest spiritual distance between them. However, they shared distinct common elements, which were reflected in the public worship practiced in the congregations. The key elements of this worship were as follows:

- Sunday worship
- Midweek worship (usually on Wednesdays)
- Ad hoc Evangelistic services (traditionally in autumn and spring)
- Outdoor baptismal services (in cases where the congregation did not have a baptistery in the church building)
- Wedding ceremonies
- Funerals

Sunday worship, as the main form of congregational worship, consisted primarily of the reading and proclamation of the Bible, prayers led by those conducting the service, communal prayer, church singing, and the sharing of testimonies (accounts by believers of God's work in their lives). This service also included the celebration of the Lord's Supper (usually once a month, often on the first Sunday of the month), the blessing of children, and the ordination of clergy. Musical accompaniment typically involved the use of musical instruments, including percussion and wind instruments. Many congregations had their own choirs actively participating in the main service.

Midweek worship usually had a simpler format and setting. The main elements included the reading and proclamation of the Bible, prayer (both individual and communal), and singing (often a capella).

The foundation of church singing was the hymnal published by the United Evangelical Church called Śpiewnik Pielgrzyma.

Another specific aspect of Christian worship were the Sunday schools existing in congregations and regularly organized youth meetings.

=== Educational activities ===
In 1948, the first Bible school of the church was established at 13 Poznańska Street. The first course began on 21 November 1948, and lasted until April 1949. Józef Mrózek served as the director. Two residential courses were held. The school's development was interrupted by the arrests of clergy in 1950, and later there were no local facilities available. The continuation of the school depended solely on Mrózek in the Presidium of the Church. In the 1960s, only short courses lasting one or several weeks took place. The resumption of activities occurred only in 1972. Mieczysław Kwiecień was appointed as the director. In 1985, the name of the Bible School was changed to Theological Seminary. Włodzimierz Rudnicki became the school's headmaster in 1982.

=== Publishing activities ===
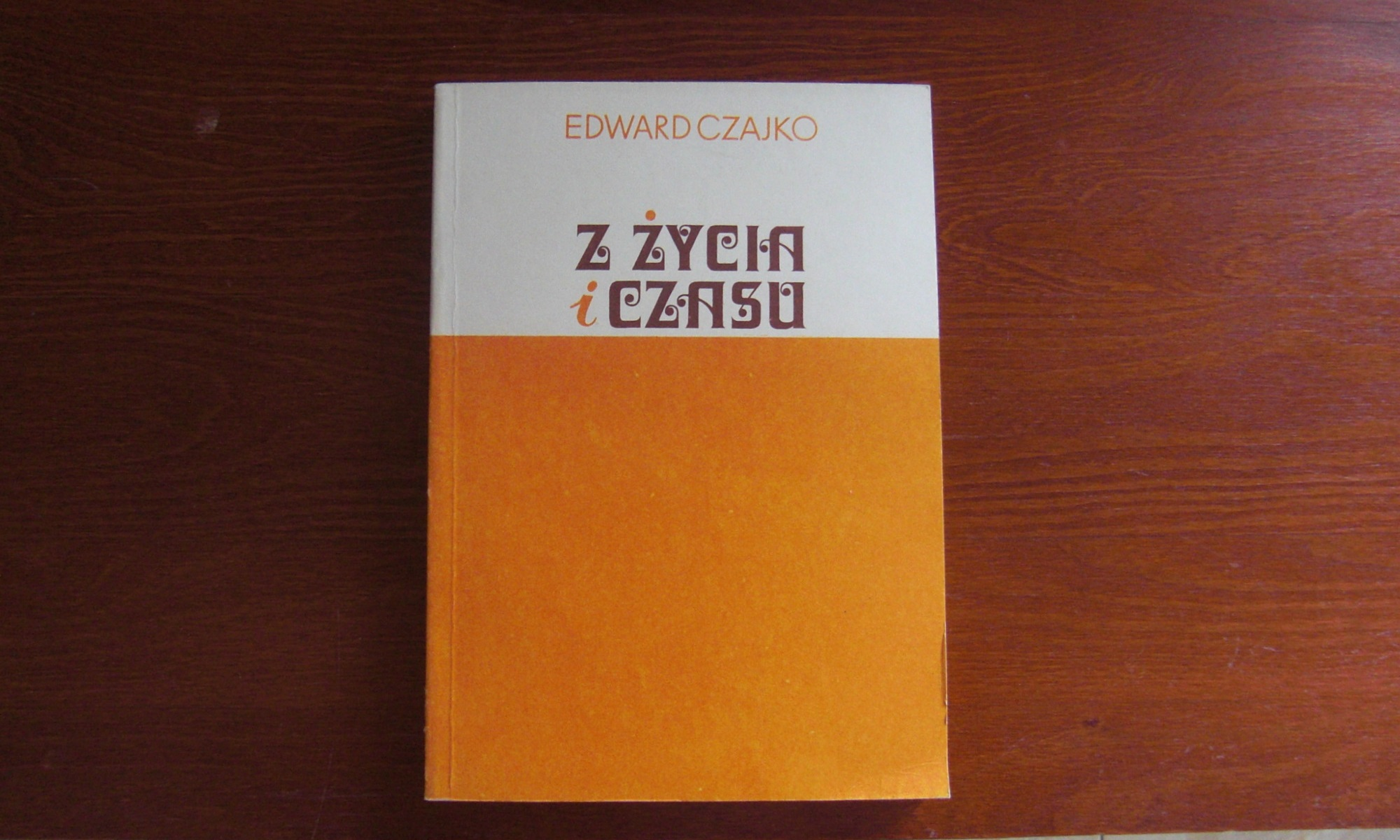
Z życia i czasu (1983)

In 1954, the authorities allowed the publication of the Biuletyn Zjednoczonego Kościoła Ewangelicznego (English: Bulletin of the United Evangelical Church). The decision to establish the publishing house was made at a meeting of the Church Council on 9 and 10 February 1957. A publishing fund was established, and Józef Prower and Bolesław Winnik began publishing activities. By the end of March 1972, 34 titles with a total circulation of 204,040 copies of books, brochures, and tracts had been printed. Eight books and scripts with a total circulation of 13,700 copies were printed using a duplicator. According to data from the Kalendarz Chrześcijanina 1977, by February 1976, 65 titles with a total circulation of 326,740 books, brochures, and tracts had been printed.

In 1975, Kazimierz Muranty took over the publishing house. From 1982, matters related to publishing were decided by the Church Council and the Presidium of the council. Since 1982, the United Evangelical Church received a large allocation of paper from the Book Department of the Ministry of Culture and Art. From 1983 to 1987, more paper was donated by fellow believers from the West. As a result, during those years, many titles were published annually, with a total circulation exceeding 100,000 copies.

=== Magazine of the United Evangelical Church ===
The monthly magazine Chrześcijanin was published from 1946 to 1948, after which, following a several-year hiatus, it was resumed in 1957 with a circulation of 5,000 copies. In the 1960s, the state authorities reduced the circulation, but in the 1970s, it was increased to 5,500 copies. In the 1980s, it was published with a circulation of 7,000. Until the end of 1988, the magazine was published as part of the United Evangelical Church. From 1989 onwards, it began to be published as the publication of the Pentecostal Church.

=== Radio and film activities ===
From December 1965, the church began broadcasting radio programs titled Głos Ewangelii z Warszawy (English: The Voice of the Gospel from Warsaw) through Trans World Radio in Monte Carlo. Stanisław Napiórkowski positively assessed them, stating that Catholics listen to these broadcasts with spiritual benefit. Starting from 4 April 1982, radio services began to be broadcast by Polish Radio. Usually, they were aired four times a year.

On 5 February 1985, the United Evangelical Church approached the Studio of Film Adaptations in Warsaw to prepare a Polish version of the film Cross and the Switchblade. The Office for Religious Affairs supported the positive handling of the matter.

=== Care activities ===
The United Evangelical Church owned a Nursing Home in Ostróda. In the mid-1980s, the church began efforts to establish centers for people struggling with addiction. In 1986, a center for drug addicts was established in Broczyna.

== Religious authorities' policy towards the United Evangelical Church ==
Informers were recruited in 1949. They were needed to report on individuals with foreign contacts. Based on informers' reports, arrests were made in September 1950. Initially, the religious authorities planned to liquidate Evangelical churches in Poland, but when this proved impossible, they aimed to control them. The goal was to have key positions in the church filled by secret collaborators. In the 1970s, the biggest problem for the authorities was the smuggling of Russian and Ukrainian religious literature from the West through Poland to the Soviet Union. Particularly active in this field were Pentecostals. The Security Service monitored the church to prevent this influx. With the involvement of the provincial commands of the militia) and border guards, individuals involved in the smuggling of literature were monitored in Szczecin, Koszalin, Gorzów Wielkopolski, Olsztyn, Białystok, Słupsk, and Gdańsk.

In the plans of the IV Department of the Ministry of Internal Affairs for the years 1972-1973 and 1974-1975, it was complained that the United Evangelical Church was insufficiently infiltrated, and orders were given to recruit secret collaborators. In the plans for 1976 and 1977, it was ordered to recruit Edward Czajko, a member of the Presidium of the United Evangelical Church, and two people involved in the Voice of the Gospel broadcasts. Active control was ordered over Rapanowicz, Mańkowski, Waszkiewicz, Rudkowski, Rudnicki, Fochman, Ilczuk, Prower, and Gaweł. It was ordered to expose individuals maintaining contacts with the West and engaged in distributing literature to the Soviet Union.

In the plans for 1978 and 1979, it was ordered to recruit two secret collaborators from the leadership of the United Evangelical Church, to strive for the placement of secret collaborators "Marian" and "Stanisław" in the senior management, and to ensure that one of them is appointed as the head of the United Evangelical Church. It was recommended to counteract the numerical growth of Pentecostals at the expense of other groups within the United Evangelical Church and to prevent Pentecostals from influencing the youth of other churches, such as Baptist and Lutheran. It was recommended to sever Pentecostal contacts with oases and other secular organizations within the Catholic Church. Control over the arrivals of emissaries from Pentecostal missionary centers in the West was ordered.

== Letters, statements, denunciations ==
=== Report of the hearing (1950) ===
Protocol from the interrogation of the suspect Teodor Maksymowicz dated 26 September 1950:

In the initial period after liberation, that is, in 1945, we began organizing Evangelical Christian branches in each of our respective areas. Towards the end of 1945, we started establishing correspondence contacts, and in this way, we found each other throughout the country. In September 1945, Jerzy Sacewicz arrived in Kętrzyn, who had authorization from the Baptists. Sacewicz posted an announcement on the Baptist chapel with his address. Based on this, we established contact with Sacewicz and invited him to Kętrzyn. Sacewicz arrived on 17 November 1945, and under his leadership, we held the first organizational meeting, during which a chairman and his deputy were elected (...). With his assistance, we organized a congregation in Kętrzyn, which consisted of Baptists, adherents of the Church of Christ, and Evangelical Christians. At that time, we stood for cooperation with all kindred denominations. This situation lasted until 1946 (...). Under pressure from Czerski and Januszewicz, I was forced to break away from the Baptists and start working independently. Januszewicz did the same in Łódź. Since the East European Mission stood for cooperation with kindred denominations, following the example of the union that took place in the USSR, I also sought cooperation with kindred denominations in my area.

=== Letter from Józef Mrózek to the Presidium of the United Evangelical Church ===
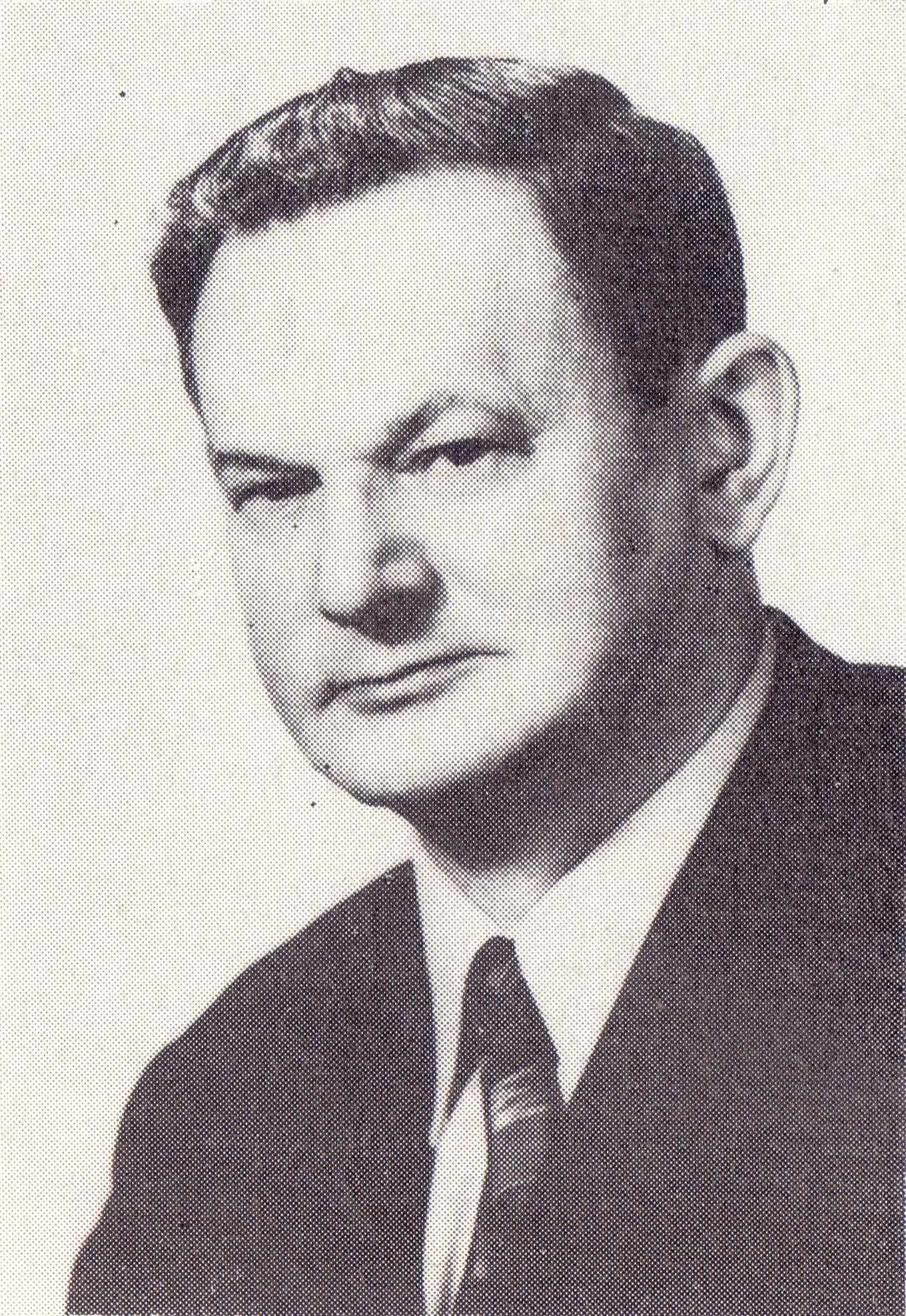
Józef Mrózek

In May 1962, Józef Mrózek – secretary of the United Evangelical Church – sent a letter to the Presidium of the United Evangelical Church, explaining why he does not want to run for the new Church Council:

I do not agree with the church's previous policy regarding schismatics, simpletons, and similar elements who only seek to benefit from being part of the United Evangelical Church but do not feel obligated to the it. These people are, moreover, unhealthy both in terms of dogma and ethics, as well as in matters of church order. (...) The majority of time at Council and Presidium meetings was spent on matters related to schismatics and similar elements, leaving little time for issues related to the church's proper tasks. Not only does the church as a whole suffer from this, but above all, work in the field suffers. I bore the sad duty of spending hundreds of hours at such meetings and documenting everything, which took hundreds more hours. I observed in myself and in other brothers that these matters ruin our personal spiritual lives. Our spiritual level presents a rather sad picture. (...) Holding a position in the Presidium of the Church Council has nationwide significance, and due to the good of the Church and the mutual relations between the church and the state, these positions should essentially be held by individuals who have the support or at least the approval of the authorities. I cannot say this about myself. I am the only member of the Presidium who has been refused a passport by the authorities. A similar fate befell my father. (...) I kindly ask you not to consider my candidacy. (...)

=== Letters to the Office for Religious Affairs ===
On 28 February 1974, Sergiusz Waszkiewicz sent a statement to the Office adopted by the participants of the pre-synodal meeting held on 11 February 1974:

- We strongly declare that we have always been in favor of the unity of the United Evangelical Church, (...) we state unequivocally the groundlessness of accusations regarding the alleged tendency to split the church.
- We believe it is necessary for the good of the United Evangelical Church to ensure doctrinal equality for all factions within the church, including Evangelical Christians, in all church agendas and in the entire church life. (...)
- We believe it is necessary to appoint – if there is a need for appointment at all – district presbyters for a given district in agreement with the congregations and representatives of the Evangelical Christian faction, provided that the majority of congregations in that district belong to this faction, or two district presbyters if there are congregations of two factions in the district (e.g., as is currently the case in the Katowice district).
- We believe it is necessary to delegate representatives from the respective factions in the Church Council to address congregation issues; if a congregation consists of followers of two factions, then two representatives should be appointed to the Church Council accordingly.
- We believe it is necessary to allow workers from all factions, including Evangelical Christians, to participate: a) in broadcasting radio programs, b) in the Bible School, c) in book and magazine publishing, d) in other church agendas.
- We believe it is necessary to elevate the status of Church Council members from all factions and provide them with protection against attacks by unauthorized individuals within the Church.
- We believe it is necessary to adhere to the Church's Statute by the Presidium of the Church Council, taking into account the principles of democratic and collective leadership in all church matters.
- We believe it is necessary to establish a commission to review the Church's Statute to prepare amendments and changes to the statute for the upcoming Church Synod.
- We nominate the following candidates – elected at the meeting by secret ballot – as members and substitutes of the Church Council for the next term: Sergiusz Waszkiewicz, Aleksander Rapanowicz, Teodor Maksymowicz, Edward Czajko, Aleksander Mańkowski, Tadeusz Gaweł, Władysław Rudkowski, Józef Suski.

An anonymous representative of the United Evangelical Church drafted a memorandum (no date or signature):

- The United Evangelical Church consists of 5 factions, forming 2 blocs: a) Evangelical – Evangelical Christians Union, Free Union, Church of Christ; b) Pentecostals – Evangelical Christians of the Faith (Pentecostals), Resolute Christians Union.
- In terms of numbers: About 1/3 of the members are Evangelical Christians of the Faith (Pentecostals), 1/3 are Free Christians, 1/3 are Evangelicals, resolute, Church of Christ, and congregations or individuals without a clear denominational label.
- So far, each of the 5 factions has had 6 members in the 30-person Church Council. This was not a proper representation of the church, as the 3 smaller factions (Evangelical, resolute, and Church of Christ), constituting only 1/5 of the Church, had as many as 18 councilors, i.e., 60%, while Evangelical Christians of the Faith and Free Christians, constituting about 2/3 of the church, had only 12 councilors in total (i.e., 40%). It is proposed that in the future, each faction should have the following number of councilors: Pentecostals – 9 and 3 alternates, Free Christians – 9 and 3 alternates, Evangelicals – 4 and 2 alternates (...). Evangelicals, resolute, Church of Christ will not be disadvantaged, as they will have a total of 12 seats, i.e., 40%, and constitute approximately 20% of the members or congregations in the church.
- There has been a tacit agreement between the factions that the Presidium of the Church Council includes 2 representatives of the Pentecostals, 2 Free Christians, and 1 representative of each of the other factions (usually as vice presidents).
- We believe that representatives from the respective factions should, as far as possible, be "native" representatives rather than artificially (...) created ones. For example, the Evangelicals are represented by Najmałowski, Muranty, and J. Tołwiński (recently also T. Jarosz), none of whom is a "native" Evangelical Christian.
- Individual church agendas are generally led by suitable individuals from different factions. It is not true that all "key" positions are concentrated in the hands of the Free Christians. For example, Pentecostals hold the positions of Treasurer of the Church Council (Maksymowicz) and Secretary of the 'Chrześcijanin' editorial office (E. Czajko), Evangelicals – Secretary of the Church Council (Muranty), Church of Christ – Head of the Publishing Department (A. Lewczuk).
- It is true that Free Christians hold the most positions, but it is also true that this faction has the greatest contribution to the church's unification work and implementation of the principles of legality, as well as the largest number of workers.
- To weaken the position of Free Christians in the church, a coalition has been formed against them, not so much of congregations, but rather of activists who usurp the right to represent our community. The attack was directed primarily at the vice president representing the Free Christians, J. Mrózek, the district elder for Katowice, M. Giertler, the Bible School (M. Kwiecień), and 'Głos Ewangelii', and as for the congregations – mainly against the Chorzów Congregation and the 1st Congregation in Warsaw.
- Synod date. It is proposed to hold it on May 10–11, with the 9th being a day of celebration for the 30th anniversary of the Polish People's Republic. All 3 days are public holidays. This will allow time to settle all matters (especially financial ones) without haste.

== Main achievements ==
Major achievements of the church throughout its entire existence include:

- Nearly 100% growth in the number of faithful
- Significant multiplication of congregations
- Construction of a series of church buildings, including the construction of a central chapel in Warsaw
- Establishment of the House for the Elderly in Ostróda
- Publishing activity, including the publication of the monthly magazine Chrześcijanin

== See also ==
- United and uniting churches

== Bibliography ==
- Biełaszko, M.; Piekarska, A. K.; Tomasik, P.; Wilanowski, C., eds. (2007). Plany pracy Departamentu IV MSW na lata 1972–1979 (in Polish). Warsaw: IPN. ISBN 978-83-6046-430-4.
- Czajko, Edward (1973). "Podstawowe zasady chrześcijan ewangelicznych. Synody Kościoła". 1973 Kalendarz Chrześcijanina (in Polish). Warsaw: ZKE.
- Czajko, Edward (1970). "Zjednoczony Kościół Ewangeliczny w okresie minionego ćwierćwiecza Polski Ludowej". Chrześcijanin (in Polish).
- Czajko, Edward (1988). "Zjednoczony Kościół Ewangeliczny". Chrześcijanin (in Polish).
- Jańczuk, Leszek (2021). "Aresztowanie 199 ewangelikalnych duchownych we wrześniu 1950 roku". Gdański Rocznik Ewangelicki (in Polish). XV.
- Jańczuk, Leszek (2022). "Próba rozłamu w Zjednoczonym Kościele Ewangelicznym w 1956 roku". Rocznik Teologiczny (in Polish). 2.
- Jańczuk, Leszek (2023). Stanisław Krakiewicz – wieloletni zwierzchnik Zjednoczonego Kościoła Ewangelicznego (in Polish). Ostrołęka – Warsaw: OTN. ISBN 978-83-62775-61-3.
- Kamiński, Marek (2012). Kościół Zielonoświątkowy w Polsce w latach 1988-2008 : Studium historyczno-ustrojowe (in Polish). Warsaw: Warszawskie Seminarium Teologiczne. ISBN 978-83-905704-8-8.
- Krakiewicz, Stanisław (1970). "Historia budowy ośrodka kościelnego i kaplicy". Chrześcijanin (in Polish).
- Krakiewicz, Stanisław (1970). "Przemówienie wstępne". Chrześcijanin (in Polish).
- Michalak, Ryszard (2004). "Dziel i rządź". Biuletyn Instytutu Pamięci Narodowej (in Polish). 3 (38).
- Mironczuk, Jan (2006). Polityka państwa wobec Zjednoczonego Kościoła Ewangelicznego w Polsce (1947-1989) (in Polish). Warsaw: Wydawnictwo Naukowe Semper. ISBN 83-89100-95-9.
- Napiórkowski, Stanisław C. (1984). "Dialog teologiczny między katolikami a protestantami". W Drodze (in Polish). 1.
- Pasek, Zbigniew (1993). Związek Stanowczych Chrześcijan. Studium historii idei religijnych (in Polish). Kraków: Colonel.
- Pasek, Zbigniew (2004). "Wspólnoty ewangelikalne we współczesnej Polsce". In Zieliński, T. J. (ed.). Ewangelikalny protestantyzm w Polsce u progu XXI stulecia (in Polish). Warsaw–Katowice: Credo. ISBN 978-83-92016-43-4.
- Sobiech, Janusz (2019). Pierwochrześcijanie. Zrzeszenie Zwolenników Nauki Pierwotnych Chrześcijan w latach 1912–1947 (in Polish). Warsaw: CLC. ISBN 978-83-954247-0-0.
- Tomaszewski, Henryk Ryszard (1991). Wyznania typu ewangeliczno-baptystycznego wchodzące w skład Zjednoczonego Kościoła Ewangelicznego w latach 1945-1956 (in Polish). Tomaszów Mazowiecki: Słowo i Życie.
- Tomaszewski, Henryk Ryszard (2009). Zjednoczony Kościół Ewangeliczny 1947-1987 (in Polish). Warsaw: KOMPAS II. ISBN 978-83-925744-5-3.
- Kozłowski, Jan; Langer, Janusz; Zagajewski, Tadeusz (1989). Atlas Wyznań w Polsce (in Polish). Warsaw: KAW. ISBN 83-03-02411-6.
