= Pentecostal Church in Poland =

Christian denomination in Poland

- Kościół Zielonoświątkowy w Rzeczypospolitej Polskiej
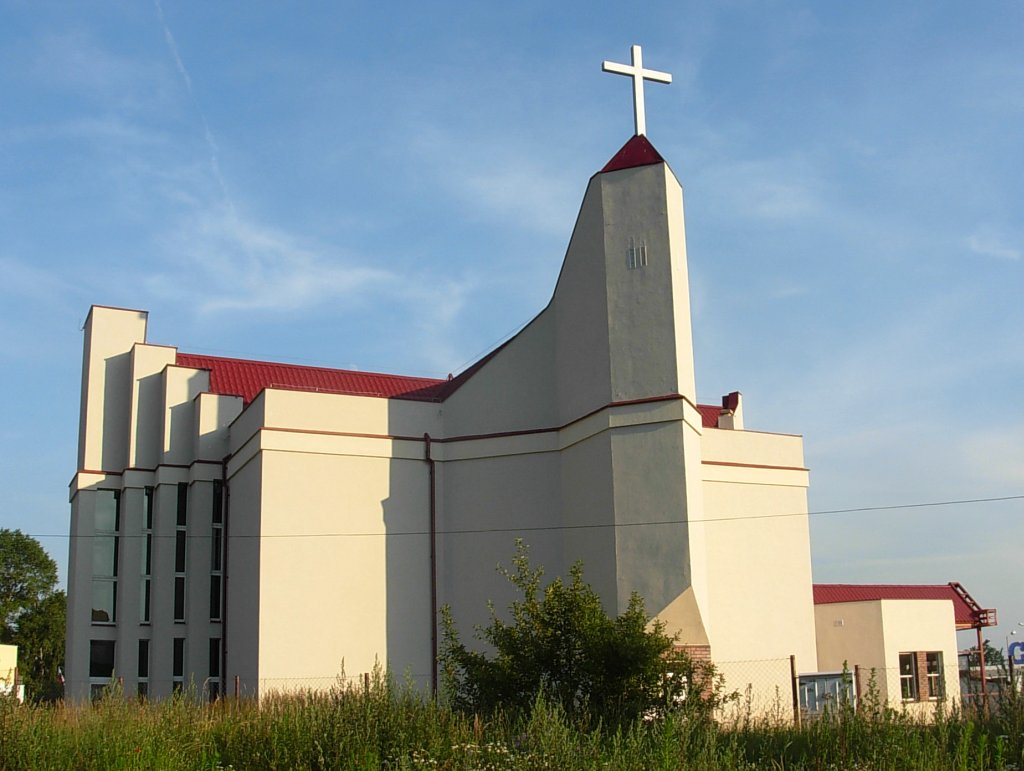
- Pentecostal Church in Bydgoszcz
- Classification: Protestant
- Orientation: Pentecostal
- Bishop: Marek Kamiński
- Districts: 7
- Associations: World Assemblies of God Fellowship
- Language: Polish
- Headquarters: Warsaw
- Territory: Poland
- Origin: 20th century
- Congregations: 240
- Members: 24,000
- Official website: https://kz.pl

The Pentecostal Church in Poland (Polish: Kościół Zielonoświątkowy w Rzeczypospolitej Polskiej) is a Pentecostal Christian denomination in Poland. It is the largest Pentecostal denomination in Poland and a part of the World Assemblies of God Fellowship, and the second largest Protestant denomination in Poland. The Pentecostal Church in Poland is a member of Pentecostal European Fellowship and Biblical Society in Poland. Headquartered in the city of Warsaw.

== History ==
The Pentecostal Church in Poland had its origins in the first bible college opened in 1929 by the Assemblies of God in the United States. The Church was forced join the United Evangelical Church of Poland during communism in 1947. The Pentecostal Church in Poland was founded in 1987.

It had 24,000 adherents and 240 congregations.

It has three Bible schools with extension programs training about 150 students and facilitates several ministries.

== Administration ==
The church is divided into seven districts:

- Central District, covering the Łódź and Masovian Voivodeships
- Eastern District, covering the Lublin, Subcarpathian and Świętokrzyskie Voivodeships
- Northern District, covering the Podlaskie and Warmian-Masurian Voivodeships
- Pomeranian District, covering the Kuyavian-Pomeranian and Pomeranian Voivodeships
- Southern District, covering the Lesser Poland and Silesian Voivodeships
- Western District, covering the Lower Silesian and Opole Voivodeships
- Western-Greater Poland District, covering the Greater Poland, Lubusz and West Pomeranian Voivodeships
