= Brzeżawa =

- Village
- Location within Poland
- Coordinates: 49°40′37″N 22°21′22″E
- Country: Poland
- Voivodeship: Subcarpathian
- County: Przemyśl
- Gmina: Bircza
- Population: 303

Brzeżawa [bʐɛˈʐava] is a village in the administrative district of Gmina Bircza, within Przemyśl County, Subcarpathian Voivodeship, in south-eastern Poland.
