= Karol (name) =

Karol is a Basque, Polish, Slovak, and Slovene given name that is a form of Karl or Karolus. Notable people with the name include the following:

== Given name ==
- Karol Adamiecki (1866–1933), Polish economist, engineer and management researcher
- Karol Adwentowicz (1871–1958), Polish actor and theater director
- Karol Anders (1893–1971), Polish Army officer
- Karol Angielski (born 1996), Polish footballer
- Karol Antoniewicz (1807–1852), Polish Jesuit and missionary
- Karol Aquilina (born 1982), Maltese lawyer and politician
- Karol Bachura (born 1964), Polish diplomat
- Karol Bačo (born 1978), Slovak water polo player
- Karol Bahrke (1868–1935), Polish printer and publisher
- Karol Baliński (1817–1864), Polish poet and revolutionary activist
- Karol Becker (fl. 1990s), Czech sprint canoer
- Karol Berger (born 1947), American musicologist
- Karol Bermúdez (born 2001), Uruguayan footballer
- Karol Bielecki (born 1982), Polish handball player
- Karol Biermann (born 1984), Slovak ice hockey player
- Karol J. Bobko (1937–2023), an American astronaut
- Karol Bohdanowicz (1867–1947), Polish mining engineer, geographer and geologist
- Karol Olgierd Borchardt (1905–1986), Polish writer and Merchant Marine captain
- Karol Borhy (1912–1997), Slovak football coach
- Karol Borsuk (1905–1982), Polish mathematician
- Karol Boscamp-Lasopolski (died 1794), Dutch diplomat
- Karol Bučko (fl. 1951–1972), Slovak football coach
- Karol-Ann Canuel (born 1988), Canadian racing cyclist,
- Karol Cariola (born 1987), Chilean midwife
- Karol Castillo (1989–2013), Peruvian model and beauty pageant titleholder
- Karol Chmiel (1911–1951), Polish military officer
- Karol Chodura (1921–2001), Polish cinematographer
- Karol Csányi (born 1991), Slovak ice hockey player
- Karol Danielak (born 1991), Polish footballer
- Karol Dejna (1911–2004), Polish linguist
- Karol Divín (1936–2022), Hungarian figure skater
- Karol Dobay (1928–1982), Slovak footballer
- Karol Dobiaš (born 1947), Slovak football player and coach
- Karol Domagalski (born 1989), Polish racing cyclist
- Karol John Drewienkiewicz (fl. 1966–2001), British Army Major General
- Karol Drzewiecki (born 1995), Polish tennis player
- Karl (Karol) Duldig (1902–1986), Austrian-Australian sculptor
- Karol Durski-Trzaska (1849–1935), Austro-Hungarian and Polish Army officer
- Karol d'Abancourt de Franqueville (soldier) (1811–1849), Polish soldier
- Karol d'Abancourt de Franqueville (lawyer) (1851–1913), Polish politician
- Karol Estreicher (junior) (1906–1984), Polish historian of art, writer and bibliographer
- Karol Estreicher (senior) (1827–1908), Polish historian, literary critic and bibliographer
- Karol Fageros (1934–1988), American tennis player
- Karol Fila (born 1998), Polish footballer
- Karol Foltán (born 1959), Slovak ice dancer
- Karol Fryzowicz (born 1991), Polish footballer
- Karol Galba (1921–2009), Slovak football official
- Karol Gregorek (born 1983), Polish footballer
- Karol Grossmann (1864–1929), Slovenian film maker
- Karol Gruszecki (born 1989), Polish basketball player
- Karol Grycz-Śmiłowski (1885–1959), Polish Lutheran priest
- Karol Gwóźdź (born 1987), Polish poet, musician, DJ, composer and music producer
- Karol Hanke (1903–1964), Polish footballer
- Karol Hiller (1891–1939), Polish artist
- Karol Hławiczka (1894–1976), Polish composer, pianist, teacher and Chopinologist
- Karol Hochberg (1911–1944), Hungarian Holocaust collaborator
- Karol Hoffmann (born 1989), Polish triple jump athlete
- Karol Hoffmann (born 1913), Polish triple jump and high jump athlete
- Karol Boromeusz Hoffman (1798–1875), Polish political writer, historian, lawyer and publisher
- Karol Hutten-Czapski (1860–1904), Polish philanthropist
- Karol Ihring (born 1953), Slovak football referee
- Karol Irzykowski (1873–1944), Polish writer, literary critic, film theoretician, and chess player
- Karol Itauma (born 2000), Slovak boxer
- Karol Jabłoński (born 1962) Polish sailor
- Karol Jakubowicz (died 2013), Polish journalism and communication science academic
- Karol Jokl (1945–1996), Slovak football player and manager
- Karol Daniel Kadłubiec (born 1937), Polish ethnographer, folklorist and historian
- Karol Karlík (born 1986), Slovak footballer
- Karol Karski (born 1966), Polish politician
- Karol Kennedy (1932–2004), American figure skater
- Karol Kisel (born 1977), Slovak footballer
- Karol Kłos (born 1989), Polish volleyball player
- Karol Kmetko (1875–1948), Slovak Roman Catholic Bishop
- Karol Kniaziewicz (1762–1842), Polish general and activist
- Karol Korím (born 1993), Slovak ice hockey player
- Karol Kossok (1907–1946), Polish footballer
- Karol Kostrubała (born 1988), Polish footballer
- Karol Kot (1946–1968), Polish serial killer
- Karol Kozun (born 1982), Polish Paralympian throwing athlete
- Karol Križan (born 1980), Slovak ice hockey player
- Karol Józef Krótki (1922–2007), Polish demographer
- Karol Kučera (born 1974), Slovak tennis player
- Karol Kulisz (1873–1940), Polish Lutheran pastor
- Karol Kurpiński (1785–1857), Polish composer, conductor and pedagogue
- Karol Kuryluk (1910–1967), Polish journalist, editor, activist, politician and diplomat
- Karol Kuzmány (1806 –1866), Slovak Lutheran pastor, writer, and theologian
- Karol Lanckoroński (1848–1933), Polish writer, art collector, and historian
- Karol Gwido Langer (1894–1948), Polish army officer
- Karol Langner (1843–1912), Polish priest
- Karol Łazar (born 1976), Polish rower
- Karol Libelt (1807–1875), Polish philosopher, writer, activist, social worker and politician
- Karol Linetty (born 1995), Polish footballer
- Karol Lipinski (1790–1861), Polish violinist and composer
- Karol Ignacy Lorinser (1796–1853), Austrian physician
- Karol Lucero (born 1987), Chilean radio personality and television host
- Karol Mackiewicz (born 1992), Polish footballer
- Karol Madaj (born 1980), Polish board game designer
- Karol Maleczyński (1897–1968), Polish historian
- Karol Mannion, Gaelic footballer
- Karol Marcinkowski (1800–1846), a Polish physician and social activist
- Karol Marko (born 1966), Slovak football manager and player
- Karol Martesko-Fenster (born 1961), American innovator and entrepreneur
- Karol Mason, American attorney, government appointee, and academic administrator
- Karol Mets (born 1993), Estonian footballer
- Karol Mészáros (born 1993), Slovak footballer
- Karol Meyer, nickname of Karoline Mariechen Meyer (born 1968), Brazilian free-diver
- Karol Mikloš (born 1972), Slovak recording artist
- Karol Miklosz (1915–2003), Ukrainian footballer
- Karol Mikrut (born 1992), Polish luger
- Karol Mikuli (1821–1897), Polish pianist, composer, conductor and teacher
- Karol Modzelewski (1937–2019), Polish historian, writer, politician and academic
- Karol Mondek (born 1991), Slovak footballer
- Karol Myśliwiec (born 1943), Polish egyptologist
- Karol Nawrocki (born 1983), President of Poland
- Karol Niemczycki (born 1999), Polish footballer
- Karol Niemira (1881–1965), Polish Roman Catholic priest
- Karol Olszewski (1846–1915), Polish chemist, mathematician and physicist
- Karol Pavelka (born 1983), Slovak football
- Karol Pawlica (1884–1970), Polish patriot
- Karol Pecze (born 1946), Slovak football manager
- Karol Piątek (born 1982), Polish footballer
- Karol Piegza (1899–1988), Polish teacher, writer, folklorist, photographer, and painter
- Karol Piltz (1903–1939), Polish chess master
- Karol Pniak (1910–1980), Polish flying ace
- Karol Podczaszyński (1790–1860), Polish architect
- Karol Pollak (1859–1928), Polish electrotechnician, inventor and businessman
- Karol Popiel (1887–1977), Polish politician
- Karol Marian Pospieszalski (1909–2007), Polish lawyer and historian
- Karol Praženica (born 1970), Slovak football player and manager
- Karol Dominik Przezdziecki (1782–1832), Polish count
- Karol Stanisław Radziwiłł (1669–1719), Polish nobleman
- Karol Stanisław Radziwiłł (1734–1790) a Polish prince
- Karol Radziwonowicz (born 1958), Polish pianist
- Karol Rathaus (1895–1954) was an Austro-Hungarian Jewish composer
- Karol Robak (born 1997), Polish taekwondo athlete
- Karol Rómmel (1888–1967), Polish military officer, sportsman and horse rider
- Karol G. Ross (born 1952), American scientist
- Karol Hubert Rostworowski (1877–1938), Polish playwright, poet and musician
- Karol Rotner, Israeli footballer
- Karol Rovelto (born 1969), American high jumper
- Karol Rusznyák (born 1967), Slovak ice hockey player
- Karol Rzepecki (1865–1931), Polish bookseller, editor, and activist
- Karol Sabath (1963–2007), Polish biologist, paleontologist and paleoartist
- Karol Sakr (born 1969), Lebanese singer
- Karol Schayer (1900–1971), Polish architect and soldier
- Karol Semik (born 1953), Polish educator
- Karol Sevilla, professional name of Karol Itzitery Piña Cisneros (born 1999), Mexican singer and actress
- Karol Sidon (born 1942), Czech rabbi, writer and playwright
- Karol Sidor (1901–1953), Slovak nationalist politician
- Karol Sikora (born 1948), British oncology physician
- Karol Skórkowski (1768–1851), Polish bishop
- Karol Skowerski (born 1984), Polish pool player
- Karol Śliwka (1894–1943), Polish politician
- Karol Sloboda (born 1983), Slovak ice hockey player
- Karol Šmidke (1897–1952), Slovak politician
- Karol Herman Stępień (1910–1943), Polish Roman Catholic martyr
- Karol Stopa (born 1948) Polish sports journalist, commentator and tennis player
- Karol Stryja (1915–1998), Polish conductor and teacher
- Karol Stuchlák (born 1990), Slovak luger
- Karol Świderski (born 1997), Polish footballer
- Karol Świerczewski (1897–1947), Polish Soviet military officer and general
- Karol Świtalski (1902–1993), Polish Lutheran priest and military chaplain
- Karol Juliusz Sym, known as Igo Sym (1896–1941), Polish actor
- Karol Szajnocha (1818–1868), Polish writer, historian, and activist
- Karol Szenajch (1907–2001), Polish ice hockey player
- Karol Szreter (1898–1933), Polish classical pianist
- Karol Szwedowski (1889–1941), Polish builder
- Karol Szymanowski (1882–1937), Polish pianist and composer
- Karol Szymański (born 1993), Polish footballer
- Karol Tarło (1639–1702), Polish politician
- Karol Tchorek (1904–1985), Polish sculptor, art dealer and collector
- Karol Telbizov (1915–1994), Bulgarian lawyer, journalist and editor
- Karol Točík (1890–1960), Slovak Roman Catholic priest, dean, and historian
- Karol Chester Tollstam, known as Chet Tollstam (1918–2003), American basketball player
- Karol Turno (1788–1860), Polish Brigadier General
- Karol Ferdynand Vasa (1613–1655), Polish noblemansza
- Karol Wedel (1813–1902), German confectioner
- Karol Wight, American museum administrator
- Karol D. Witkowski (1860–1910), a Polish artist
- Karol Wolfram (1899–1965), Polish Evangelical priest and professor
- Karol Józef Wojtyła, birth name of Pope John Paul II (1920–2005), Polish head of the Catholic Church and sovereign of the Vatican City State
- Karol Fryderyk Woyda (1771–1845), Polish politician
- Karol Ząbik (born 1986), Polish speedway rider
- Karol Zachar (1918–2003), Slovak director, actor, art director, costume designer and pedagogue
- Karol Zając (1913–1965), Polish alpine skier
- Karol Zalewski (born 1993), Polish sprint athlete
- Karol Zaremba (1846–1897), Polish architect
- Karol Wiktor Zawodziński, who used the pseudonym Karol de Johne (1890–1949), Polish literary critic, theoretist and historian of literature
- Karol Ziemski (1895–1974), Polish Army general
- Karol Zine, Indian television actress
- Karol Żurek (born 1949), Polish ice hockey player
- Karol Życzkowski (born 1960), Polish physicist and mathematician

== Nickname ==
- Karol Conká, birth name Karoline dos Santos Oliveira (born 1987), Brazilian entertainer
- Karol G, stage name of Carolina Giraldo Navarro (born 1991), Colombian singer and songwriter
- Tina Karol, stage name of Tetyana Hryhorivna Liberman (born 1985), Ukrainian singer

== Middle name ==
- Józef Karol Konrad Chełmicki (born 1814–1890), Polish military officer
- Jan Karol Chodkiewicz (c. 1561–1621), Lithuanian military commander
- Adam Karol Czartoryski, Spanish aristocrat
- Jan Karol Czolański (died 1664), Ukrainian Roman Catholic prelate
- Jan Karol Dolski (1637–1695), Polish nobleman
- Jozef Karol Hell, known by his Hungarian name József Károly Hell (1713–1789), Hungarian mining engineer and inventor
- Juliusz Karol Kunitzer (1843–1905), Polish industrialist, activist, and philanthropist
- Jerzy Karol Kurnatowski (1874–1934), Polish lawyer, economist, academic, author, politician, public official, and political scientist
- Józef Karol Lubomirski (1638–1702), a Polish nobleman
- Jan Karol Opaliński (1642–1695), Polish starost and kasztelan
- Zygmunt Karol Radziwiłł (1591–1642), Polish-Lithuanian noble
- Jan Karol Tarło (c. 1593–1645), Polish noble

== Surname ==
- Davida Karol (1917–2011), Israeli actress
- Dušan Karol (born 1983), Czech tennis player
- Erik Karol (born 1963), French singer, author and composer
- Sanjay Karol (born 1961), Indian judge
- Tina Karol (born 1985), Ukrainian singer, songwriter actress and TV presenter
- Yuliya Karol (born 1991), Belarusian middle-distance athlete

== See also ==
- Karol (disambiguation)
- Carol (given name)
- Karel (given name)
- Karl (given name)
- Karlo (name)
- Karo (name)
- Karola
- Karole
- Karoli (name)
- Karolj
- Károly
- Karon (name)
- Karyl
