= Helena d'Abancourt de Franqueville =

Poland art historian and librarian

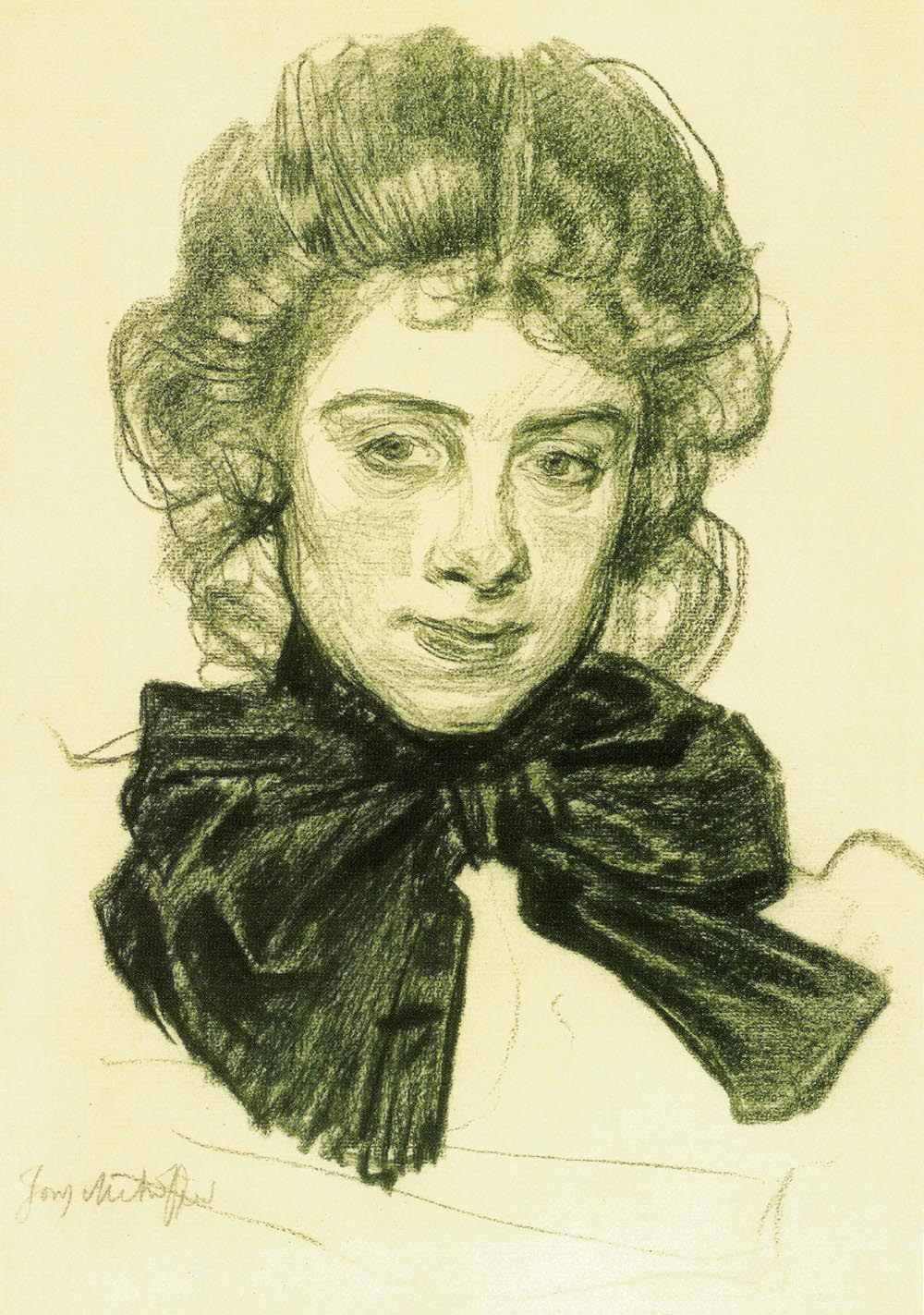
- Józef Mehoffer (1893) "Portret Heleny d'Abancourt de Franqueville"
- Born: 26 February 1874; Vienna, Austria-Hungary
- Died: 16 November 1942 (aged 68); Kraków, General Government
- Education: Jagiellonian University
- Occupations: Art historian; librarian; translator
- Employers: National Museum in Kraków; Polish Academy of Arts and Sciences
- Father: Francis Xavier d'Abancourt de Franqueville
- Relatives: Karol d'Abancourt de Franqueville (brother); Karol d'Abancourt de Franqueville (paternal uncle)
- Family: de Francqueville family

Helena d'Abancourt de Franqueville (1874–1942) was a Polish art historian, librarian, and translator.

== Early life ==
Helena d'Abancourt de Franqueville was born on 26 February 1874 in Vienna, Austria-Hungary (present-day, Austria) to Francis Xavier d'Abancourt de Franqueville.

== Career ==
d'Abancourt is best remembered for her work as a historian at the National Museum, Kraków and a librarian at the Polish Academy of Arts and Sciences. She is also remembered for her translations of the works of Romain Rolland and Ivo Vojnović.

d'Abancourt contributed biographies of her family to the Polish Biographical Dictionary.

== Later life ==
d'Abancourt died on the 16 November 1942 in Kraków during the Occupation of Poland.
