= Karol d'Abancourt de Franqueville =

Karol d'Abancourt de Franqueville may refer to:

- Karol d'Abancourt de Franqueville (soldier) (1811–1849), Polish soldier who fought against the Austrians
- Karol d'Abancourt de Franqueville (lawyer) (1851–1913), Polish politician, social activist, and lawyer
