= Kakoli =

Kakoli (Persian: کاکلی), also rendered as Kakuli, may refer to:

- Kakoli, Bushehr
- Kakoli, Fars
- Kakoli, North Khorasan
- Umbo Ungu dialect of Kaugel language of Papua New Guinea

== See also ==
- Karoli (name)
