= Mieczysław Kwiecień =

Polish clergyman, Bible scholar, translator, and preacher

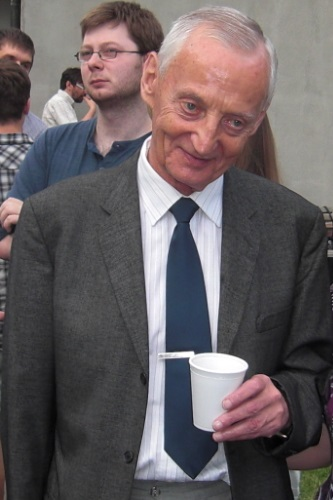
- Mieczysław Kwiecień (2013)
- Born: June 15, 1936; Warsaw
- Died: September 14, 2020 (aged 84); Warsaw
- Burial place: Evangelical Reformed Cemetery, Warsaw
- Religion: Pentecostalism
- Church: United Evangelical Church in Poland; Pentecostal Church in Poland

Mieczysław Tadeusz Kwiecień (15 June 1936 – 14 September 2020) was a Polish Pentecostal Protestant clergyman, Bible scholar, translator, and preacher at the Warsaw-Wola Congregation of the Pentecostal Church. He graduated from the Christian Theological Academy (1960) and the University of Basel (1961). He served as the Head of the United Evangelical Church Bible School (1972–1981) and was a longtime dean and lecturer at the Warsaw Theological Seminary. He prepared a concordance for the Warsaw Bible and collaborated with religious magazines from three Protestant churches.

== Biography ==
Mieczysław Tadeusz Kwiecień was born on 15 June 1936 in Warsaw. His father died in the Vaihingen concentration camp in December 1944. In 1953, he became a member of the Warsaw congregation of the United Evangelical Church in Poland. He studied theology at the Christian Theological Academy in Warsaw (1955–1960) and the University of Basel (1960–1961), where he attended lectures by Karl Barth and Oscar Cullmann. He married Bożena, an economist, with whom he had a daughter, Monika.

In 1963, he became a preacher at the First Warsaw Congregation and, from 1984, at the Fourth Warsaw Congregation of the United Evangelical Church. In 1971, he joined the Church Council of the United Evangelical Church as a representative of Free Christians, serving until 1978. From 1972 to 1981, he led the reestablished Bible School, resigning due to pressure from Kazimierz Muranty, the Church Council secretary. Włodzimierz Rudnicki succeeded him in this role. In 1984, he and a group of Pentecostals formed their own congregation, the Warsaw-Wola Congregation of the Pentecostal Church. He remained a lecturer, teaching Old Testament Introduction, and was also interested in church history and Christian-Jewish dialogue. He mentored many generations of pastors and church workers.

During the Polish People's Republic, he was surveilled by the secret police for 15 years. After the fall of communism, he chose not to learn who had informed on him. Adam Ciućka described him as a model Christian during that era.

He died on 14 September 2020. His funeral took place on 23 September at the Evangelical Reformed Cemetery in Warsaw (Section 10-2-14).

His daughter, Monika, was editor-in-chief of Jednota and the magazine Chrześcijanin (2002–2009).

== Biblical scholar and publicist ==
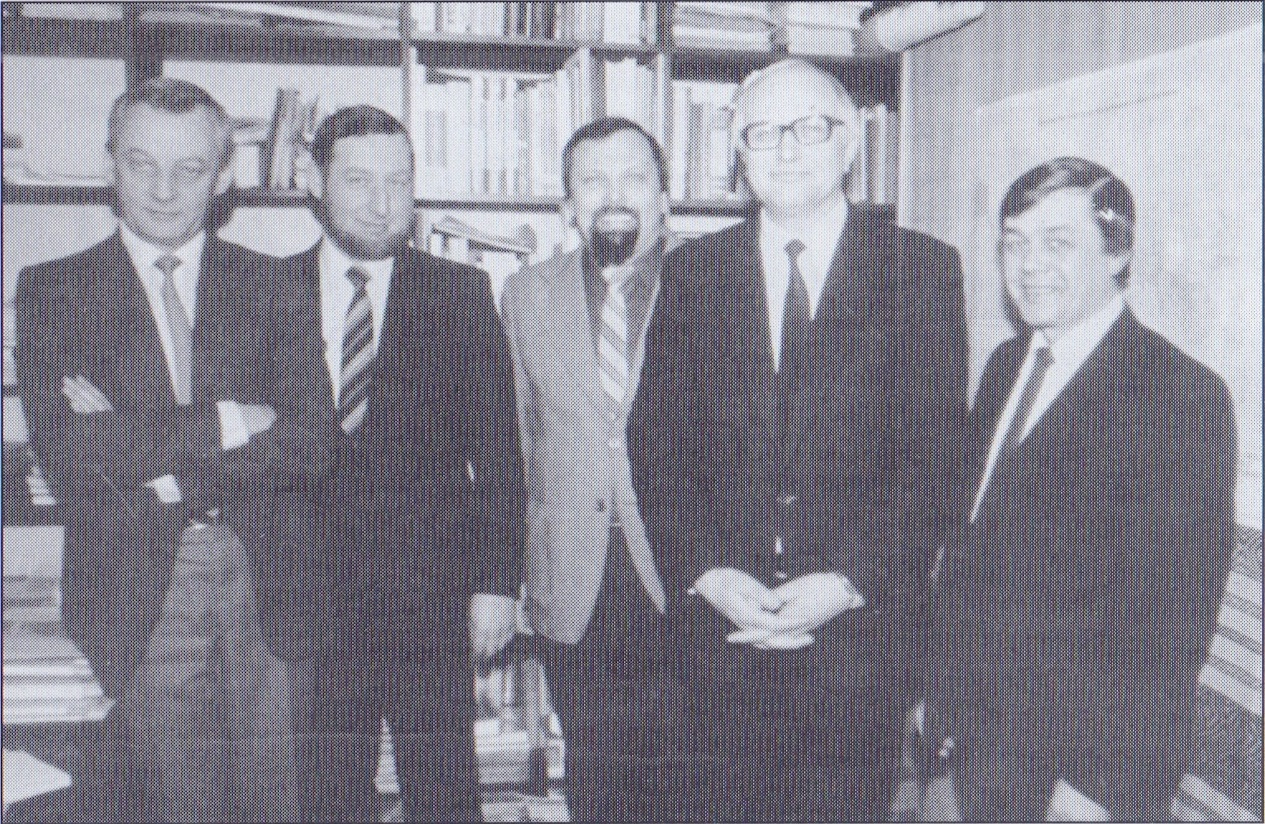
Editorial team of Chrześcijanin (1988), from the left: Kwiecień, Tomaszewski, M. Czajko, E. Czajko, and K. Krystoń

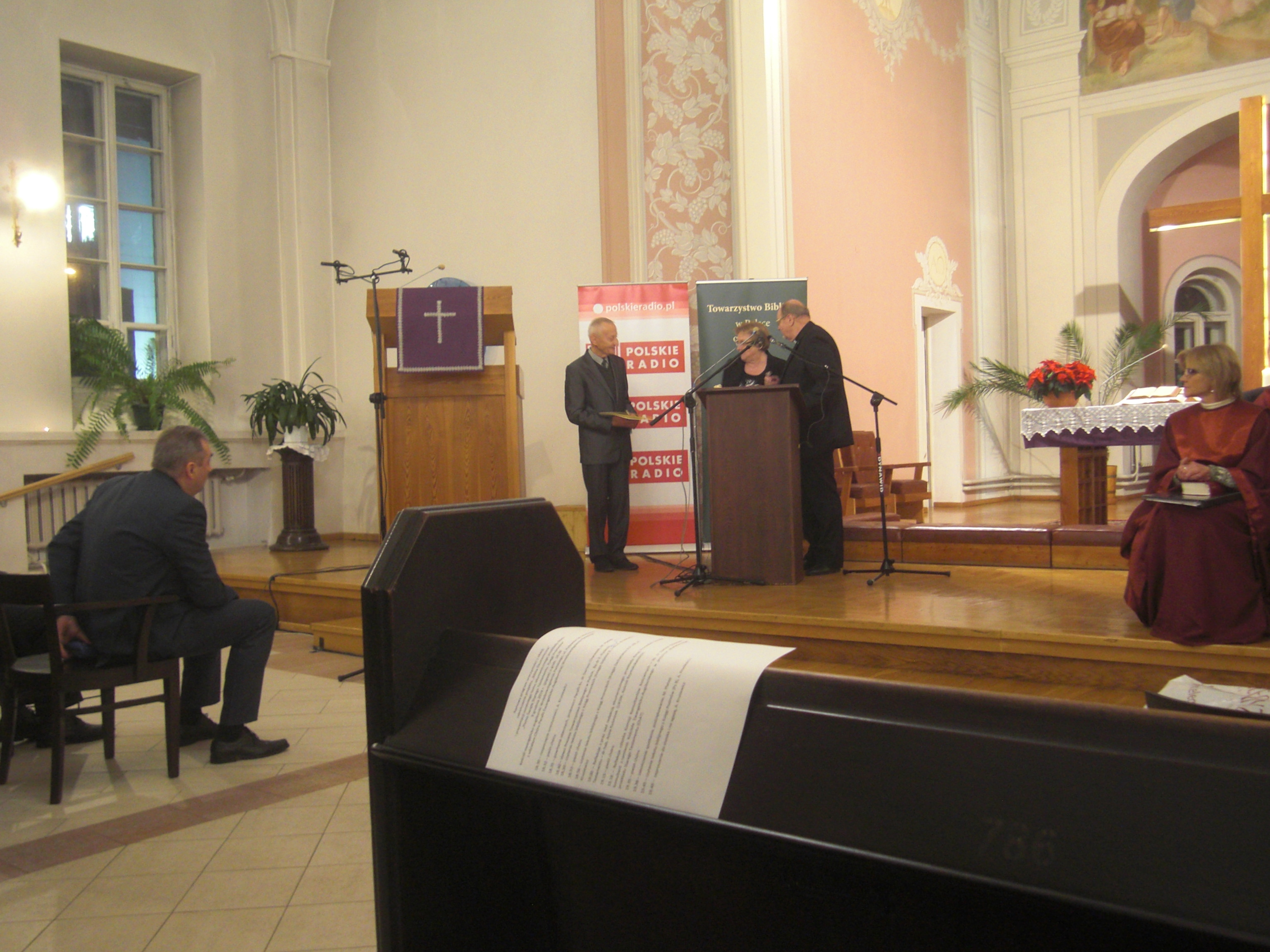
Receiving a diploma from the Bible Society during the presentation of the Prophetic Books of the ecumenical translation (9 December 2016)

In 1962, together with Edward Czajko, Kwiecień wrote a series of articles for the Jubilee Calendar of the United Evangelical Church for the year 1963. They edited the calendar both in terms of content and technical aspects, but due to internal church policies, Józef Mrózek junior and Bolesław Winnik were also listed in the editorial credits.

From 1963 to 1970, he was a regular contributor to Jednota. Between 1964 and 1971 and between 1982 and 1988, he served as the editorial secretary of Chrześcijanin. During that time, most of the editorial workload fell on him, as other members had church duties and could not dedicate much time to the publication. In a 1988 interview with Chrześcijanin, he stated that working on the magazine was an essential part of his life. In 1989, from January to December, he was the editor-in-chief of the magazine. He also contributed to Słowo i Życie, the publication of the Church of Christ's Assemblies.

Between 1982 and 2012, Kwiecień collaborated with Orthodox priest Jan Anchimiuk (later Archbishop Jeremiasz), Catholic priest Professor Michał Czajkowski, and Catholic journalist Jan Turnau to produce an ecumenical translation of the New Testament. This was a private initiative without official church support and was thus named the Ecumenical Translation of Friends.

He wrote a biography of Watchman Nee, which was serialized in Chrześcijanin in 1981 and later published in full in the Christian Calendar. In 1999, the Cieszyn congregation published it as a book. Along with Józef Kajfosz, he compiled a concordance for the Warsaw Bible.

In 1977, he proposed a definition of "free churches":

A free church is a new Christian community that has emerged from an authentic desire to fully fulfill God's will and to remain obedient and faithful to the only Lord, Jesus Christ, and his universal Kingdom. In its testimony of faith, it manifests a different kind of Christian spirituality, consisting of people who participate voluntarily, responsibly, and consciously.

This definition was later cited by Henryk Ryszard Tomaszewski and Wojciech Gajewski.

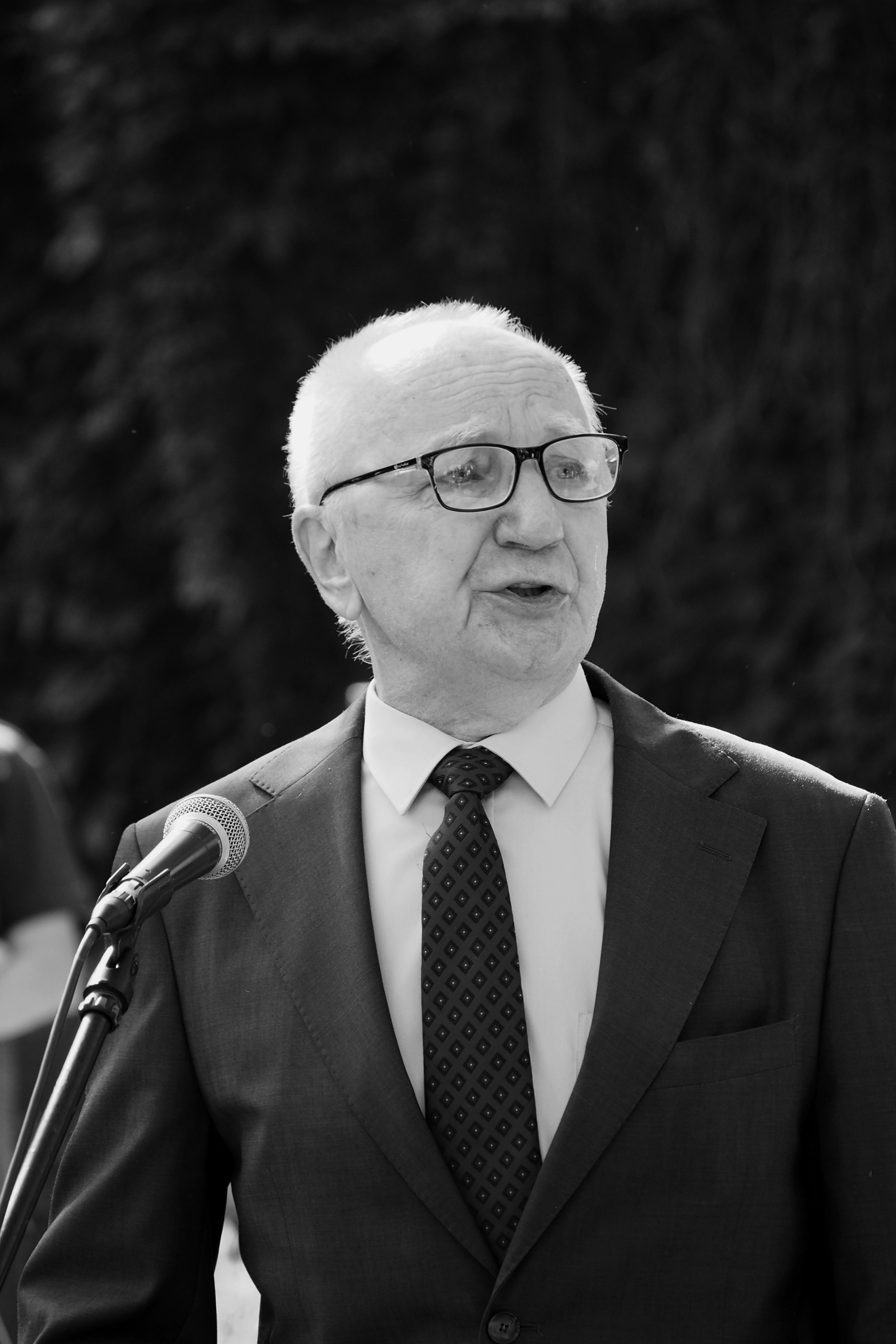
Waldemar Lisieski delivering a speech at Kwiecień's funeral

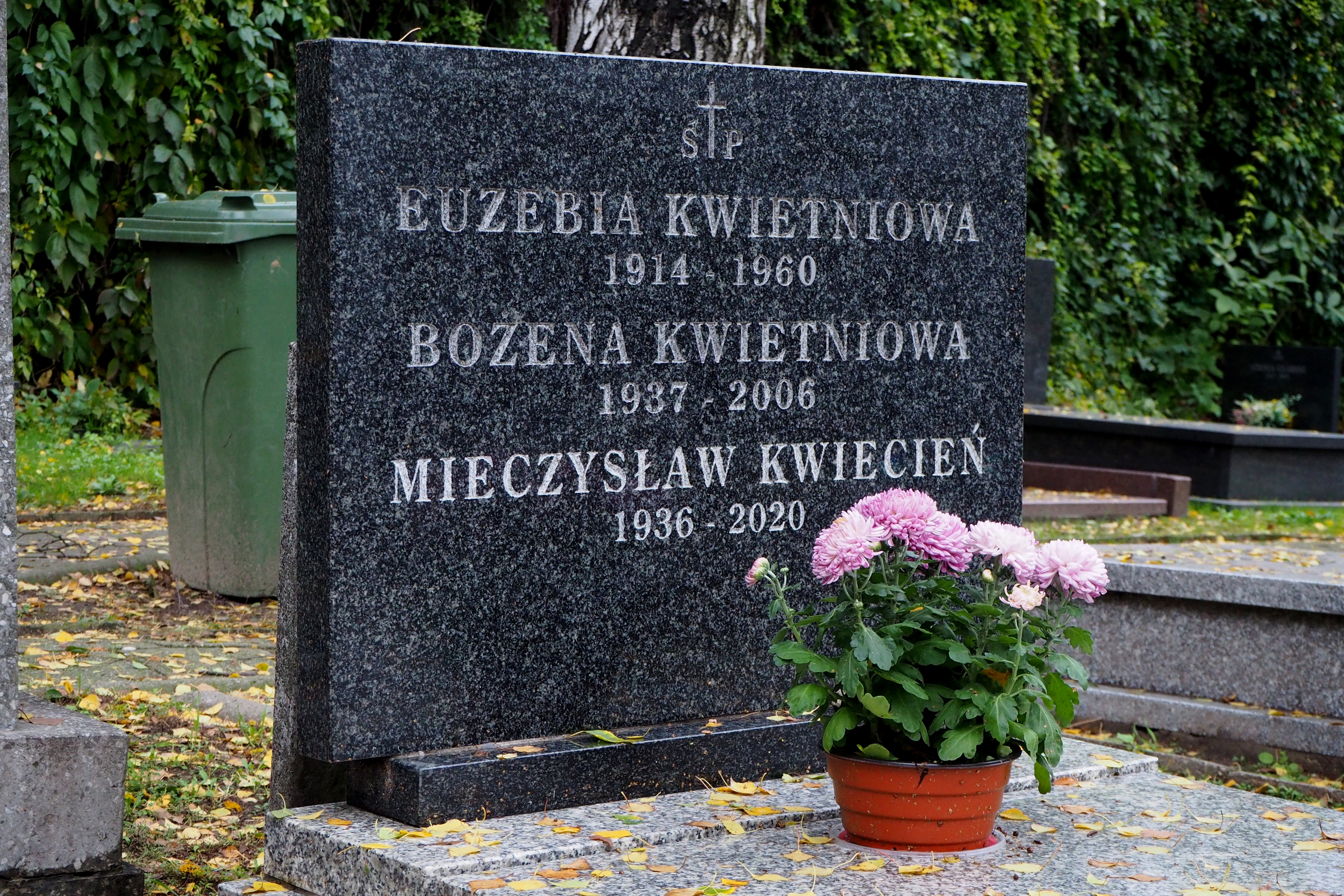
Mieczysław Kwiecień's grave at the Evangelical Reformed Cemetery on Żytnia Street in Warsaw

== Publications ==
=== Books ===
- Watchman Nee. Biografia [Watchman Nee. Biography] (in Polish). Arka. 1999. ISBN 83-911305-2-5.
- Kajfosz, Józef; Kwiecień, Mieczysław, eds. (1995). Konkordancja Biblijna do Pisma Świętego Starego i Nowego Testamentu (Biblia Warszawska) [Biblical Concordance to the Holy Scriptures of the Old and New Testament (Warsaw Bible)] (in Polish). Warsaw: Vocatio. ISBN 83-7146-029-5.

=== Articles ===
- "Ruch ewangelicznych chrześcijan" [The Evangelical Christian Movement]. Kalendarz Jubileuszowy 1963 (in Polish). Warsaw: Zjednoczony Kościół Ewangeliczny: 57–65. 1963.
- "O dziejach języka Starego Testamentu" [On the History of the Old Testament Language]. Chrześcijanin (in Polish). 3: 9–13. 1977.
- "O wolnych kościołach" [On Free Churches]. Chrześcijanin (in Polish). 7–8: 5–11. 1977.
- "O ofiarach starotestamentowych" [On Old Testament Sacrifices]. Kalendarz Chrześcijanina (in Polish): 241–250. 1979.
- "Słownik miar, wag i monet występujących w starożytności biblijnej" [Dictionary of Measures, Weights, and Currencies in Biblical Antiquity]. Kalendarz Chrześcijanina (in Polish): 251–257. 1979.
- "Moje tak i nie" [My Yes and No]. Więź (in Polish). 10 (480): 56–61. 1998.
- "Moi mistrzowie duchowi (ankieta)" [My Spiritual Mentors (Survey)]. Więź (in Polish). 9 (503): 67–71. 2000.
- "Dlaczego chrześcijanie w Polsce powinni modlić się za narodem żydowskim?" [Why Should Christians in Poland Pray for the Jewish People?]. Chrześcijanin (in Polish). 5–6: 16–17. 2008.

=== Translations ===
- Tozer, A. W. (1992). Klucz do głębszego życia [The Key to a Deeper Life] (in Polish). Translated by Kwiecień, M.; Lisieski, W. Warsaw: Vocatio. ISBN 83-85435-12-3.
- Nowy Testament. Ekumeniczny Przekład Przyjaciół [New Testament. Ecumenical Translation of Friends] (in Polish). Henryk Ryszard Tomaszewski. 2012. ISBN 978-83-940927-2-6.

== Bibliography ==
- Tomaszewski, Henryk Ryszard (2009). Zjednoczony Kościół Ewangeliczny 1947–1987 [United Evangelical Church 1947–1987] (in Polish). Warsaw: KOMPAS II. ISBN 978-83-925744-5-3.
