= Milobar =

Milobar is a Croatian surname. Notable people with the surname include:

- Karola Maier Milobar (1876–?), Croatian physician
- Peter Milobar (born 1970), Canadian politician
