= Karula =

Karula may refer to several places in Estonia:

- Karula, Lääne-Viru County, village in Haljala Parish, Lääne-Viru County
- Karula, Valga County village in Valga Parish, Valga County
- Karula, Viljandi County, village in Viljandi Parish, Viljandi County
- Karula National Park in southern Estonia
- Karula Upland in southern Estonia
- Karula Parish, former municipality in Valga County

== See also ==
- Karola
