= Edward Czajko =

Polish Pentecostal pastor, theologian, and ecumenist

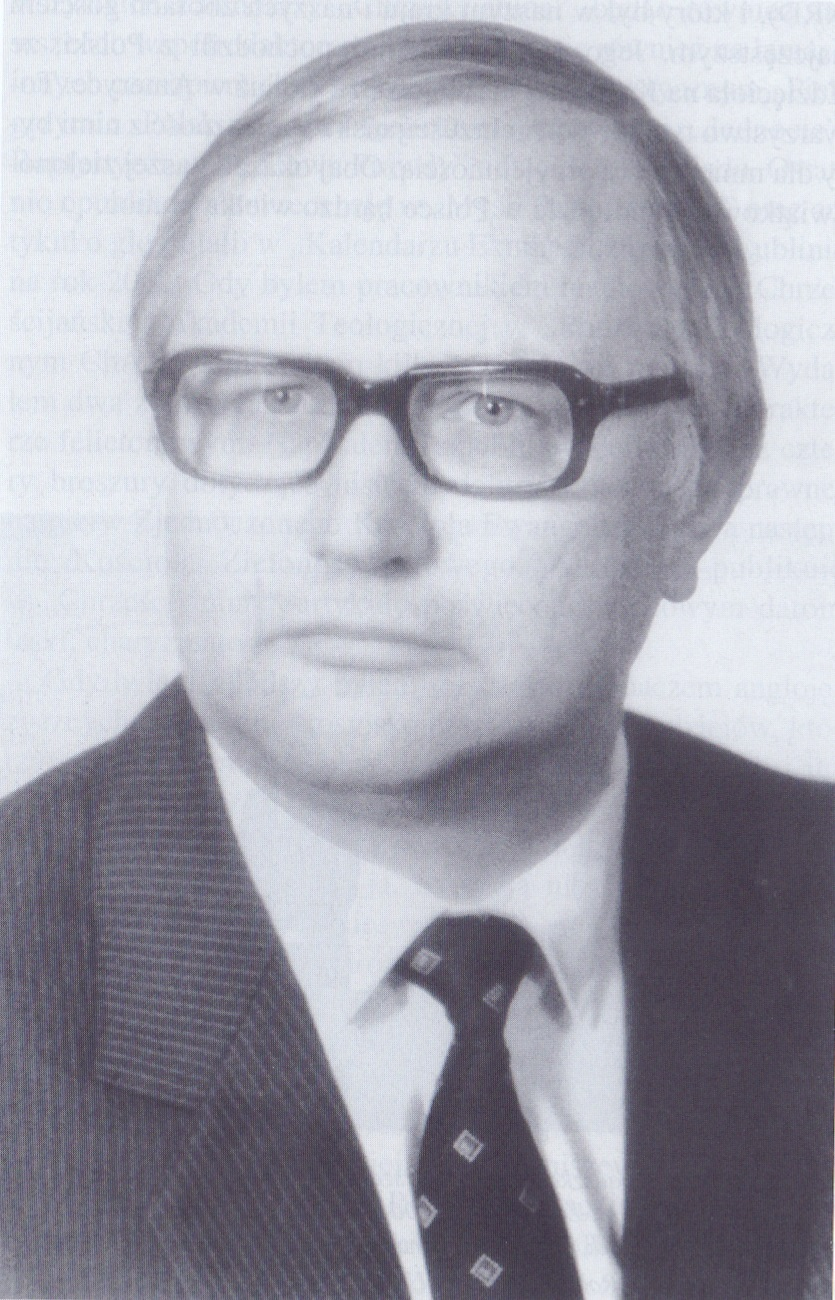
- Edward Czajko in 1987
- Born: September 22, 1934; Kuzmichy, near Novogrudok
- Died: July 31, 2025 (aged 90)
- Burial place: Evangelical Reformed Cemetery, Warsaw

Ecclesiastical career
- Religion: Pentecostalism
- Church: United Evangelical Church in Poland, Pentecostal Church in Poland
- Offices held: Secretary of the United Evangelical Church (1965–1971); President of the United Evangelical Church (1981–1988)

Edward Czajko (22 September 1934 – 31 July 2025) was a Polish Pentecostal pastor, theologian, and writer. He served as the head of the United Evangelical Church from 1981 to 1988 and was a long-time pastor, author of numerous books and articles, and an active ecumenist. He was a co-founder of the Evangelical Alliance in the Republic of Poland and was critical of the Charismatic movement.

== Early life and education ==
Edward Czajko was born on 22 September 1934 in Kuzmichy, near Novogrudok, Poland. Raised in a Pentecostal family, his father, Władysław, was a preacher. In February 1946, due to the repatriation of Poles from Kresy, his family relocated to Trzcianka, Poland. In September 1950, his father was arrested during Operation B on charges of espionage for American imperialism.

On 3 July 1949, Czajko was baptized by Sergiusz Waszkiewicz. He served in the Polish Navy from 1954 to 1957. He pursued theological studies at the Christian Theological Academy in Warsaw and also studied at Didsbury Methodist College in Bristol, United Kingdom.

On 1 January 1964, he married Irena Korniluk, daughter of Mikołaj Korniluk, a prominent figure in the Church of Christ in Poland.

== Clerical career ==
In 1964, Czajko was ordained as a minister of the United Evangelical Church. He served as a regional presbyter for Greater Poland from 1965 to 1971, secretary of the United Evangelical Church from 1965 to 1971, a member of its leadership from 1972 to 1974, and treasurer from 1975 to 1981.

He was involved in the United Evangelical Church's publishing activities, contributing articles and editing the 1963 edition of Kalendarz Chrześcijanina, a jubilee issue marking the 10th anniversary of the United Evangelical Church's expansion in 1953. According to Czajko, he authored a memorandum to the authorities advocating for radio broadcasts via Trans World Radio in Monte Carlo.

After the removal of Stanisław Krakiewicz from the United Evangelical Church Presidium in 1975, Czajko returned as treasurer. On 28 November 1981, he was elected president of the United Evangelical Church Council.

From 1981 to 2001, he served as pastor of the Warsaw Pentecostal Congregation (from 1988 under the Pentecostal Church). He initiated the construction of the church and congregation's headquarters at 68/70 Sienna Street in Warsaw.

Following the dissolution of the United Evangelical Church, Czajko served on the Presidium of the Supreme Council of the Pentecostal Church from 1988 to 2004, pastored the Warsaw congregation from 1981 to 2001, and was editor-in-chief of the Pentecostal Church's monthly magazine, Chrześcijanin, from 1990 to 1991. Alongside Marian Suski, he contributed to drafting the 20 February 1997 parliamentary act regulating the relationship between the Polish state and the Pentecostal Church.

== Conflict with Krakiewicz ==
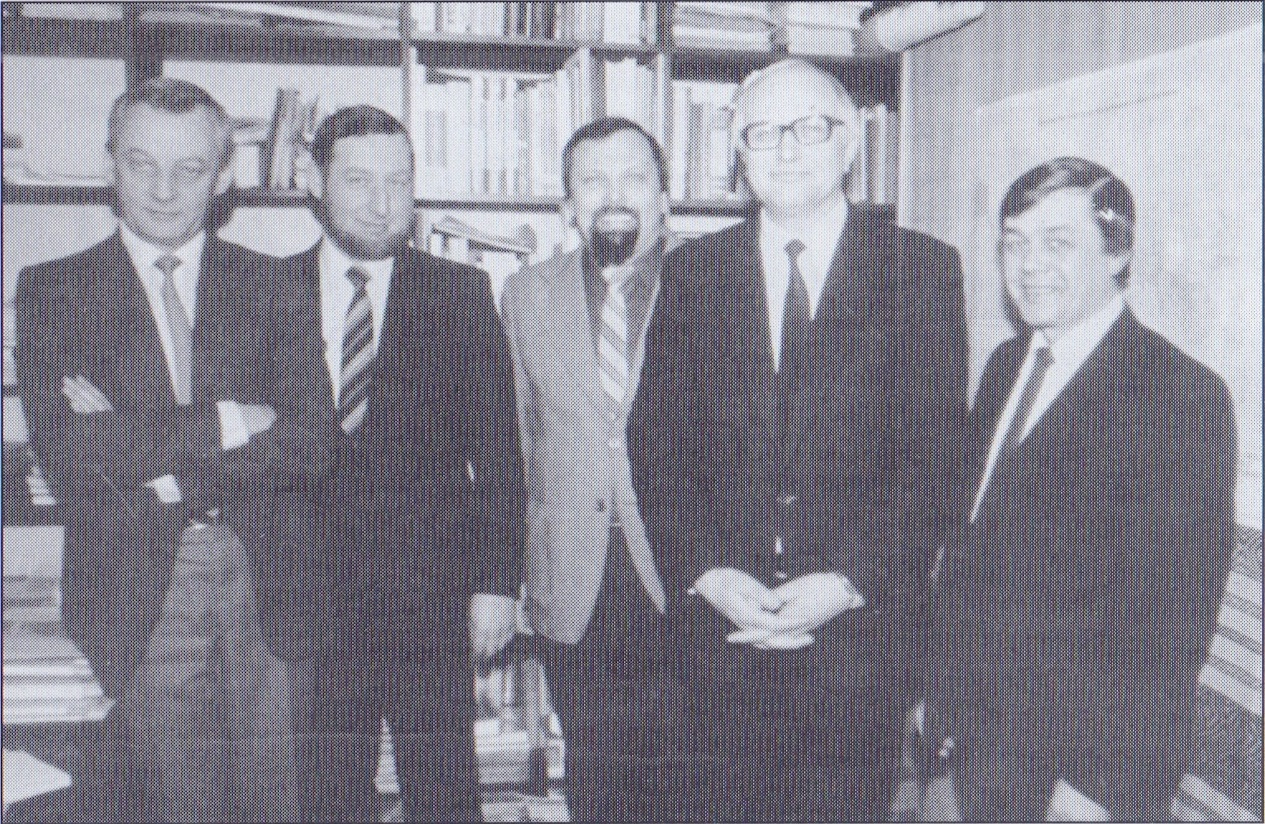
Editorial team of Chrześcijanin in 1988, from left: Mieczysław Kwiecień, Henryk Ryszard Tomaszewski, Mieczysław Czajko, Edward Czajko, and K. Krystoń

Until autumn 1970, Czajko enjoyed the trust and support of United Evangelical Church president Stanisław Krakiewicz. In November 1970, he organized an inter-congregational youth meeting in Koszalin, against Krakiewicz's wishes, which included foreign guests. This event drew attention from religious and political authorities, who deemed Czajko an enemy of the Polish People's Republic. The Office for Religious Affairs accused him of creating an "independent Pentecostal movement operating beyond the control of both church and state authorities". This sparked a conflict with Krakiewicz, leading to Czajko's removal as head of the United Evangelical Church Bible School and eviction from his official residence at 10 Zagórna Street. In 1971, Krakiewicz pressured him not to run for the United Evangelical Church Presidium, and Czajko was also dismissed from the Christian Theological Academy.

== Academic and publishing work ==
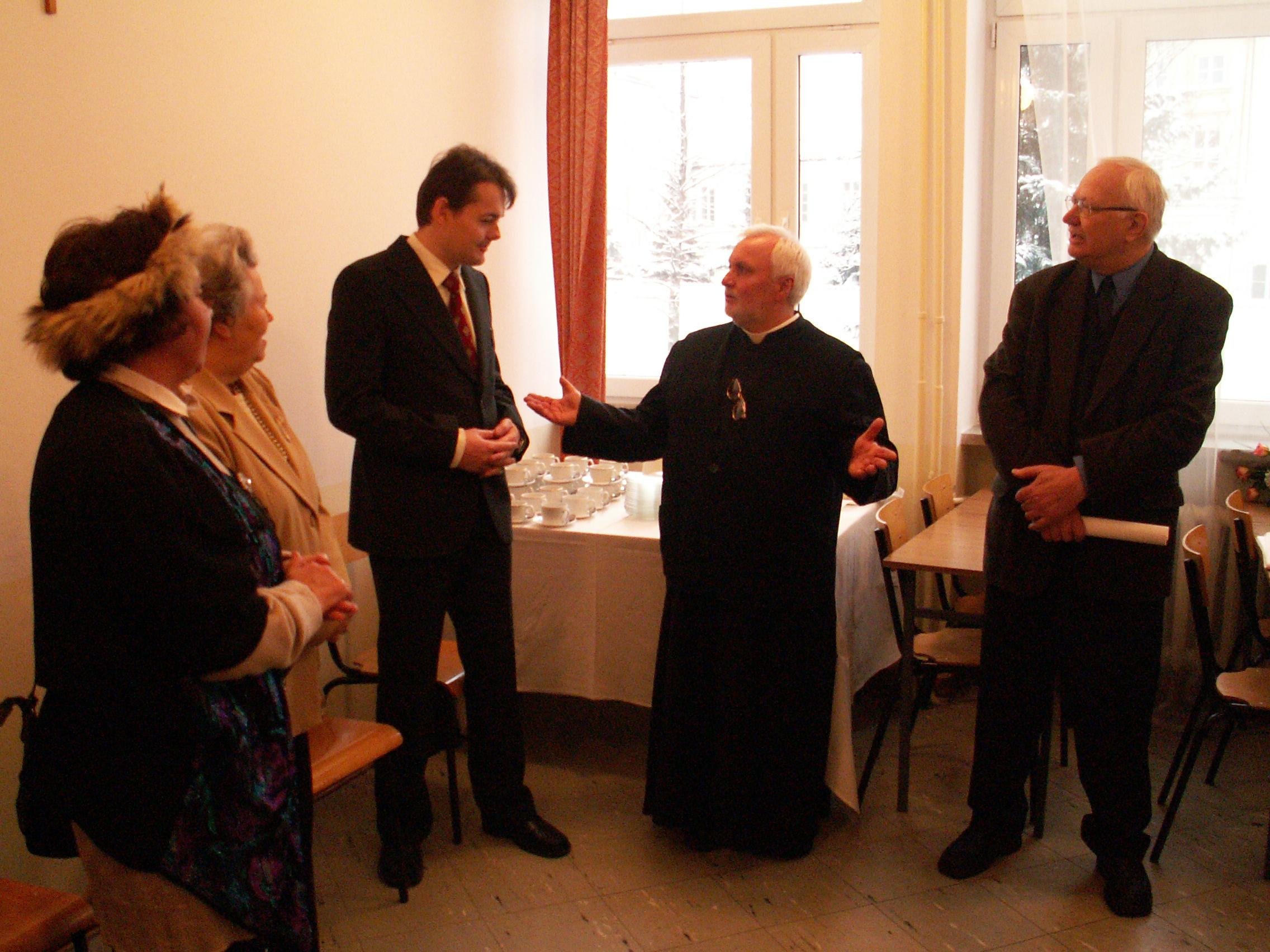
Edward Czajko (far right) with Jerzy Banak, Leszek Jańczuk, and Barbara Enholc-Narzyńska in 2005

From 1966 to 1971, Czajko was an academic at the Christian Theological Academy. He claimed his dismissal from the Christian Theological Academy was politically motivated. He later taught at the United Evangelical Church Bible School and the Warsaw Theological Seminary.

From 1965 to 2008, he was associated with the editorial team of Chrześcijanin, serving as secretary from 1971 to 1981, program council chair from 1988 to 1990, and editor-in-chief from 1990 to 1991.

Czajko authored numerous books, academic articles, and popular writings published in journals such as Rocznik Teologiczny, Studia i Dokumenty Ekumeniczne, Studia Theologica Pentecostalia, Chrześcijanin, Pielgrzym Polski, Jednota, Słowo Prawdy, Myśl Protestancka, and Kalendarz Ekumeniczny. He was a member of the European Pentecostal Theological Association, the European Pentecostal-Charismatic Research Association, and the Society for Pentecostal Studies.

== Ecumenical activities ==
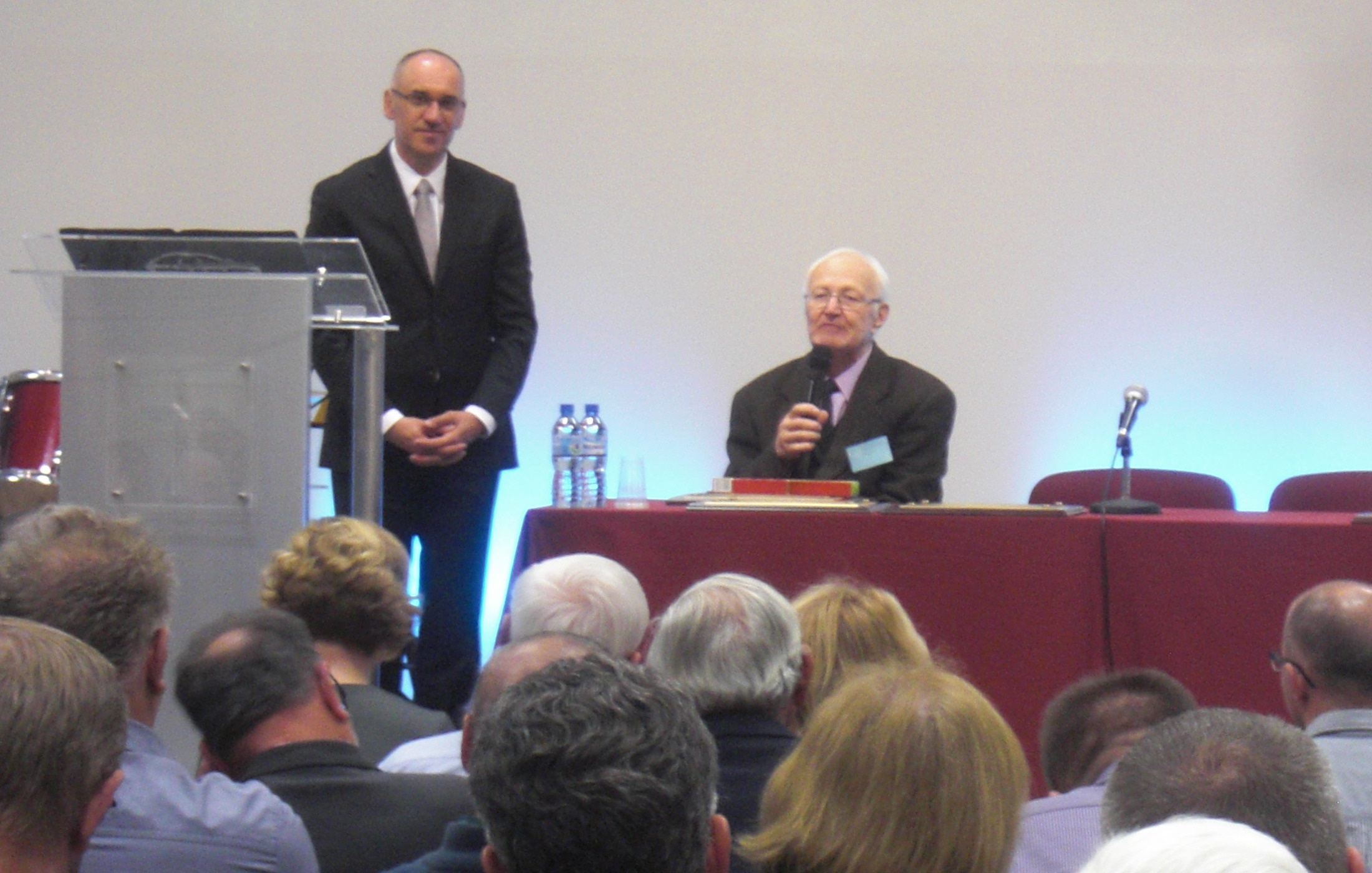
Edward Czajko (right) at the Pentecostal Church Synod, 22 September 2016

Czajko served as vice-president (1983–1986) and treasurer (1986–1988) of the Polish Ecumenical Council. In 1984, during the XI United Evangelical Church Synod, a delegate proposed withdrawing from the council. Czajko urged restraint, convincing the proposer to retract the motion.

He was a key co-founder of the Evangelical Alliance in the Republic of Poland and served as deputy chairman of its National Council from 2000 to 2003. Until 2004, he was a member of the National Committee of the Polish Bible Society. He participated in the second phase of the Ecumenical Translation of the New Testament, serving on the advisory committee for the Pentecostal Church.

== Theological views ==
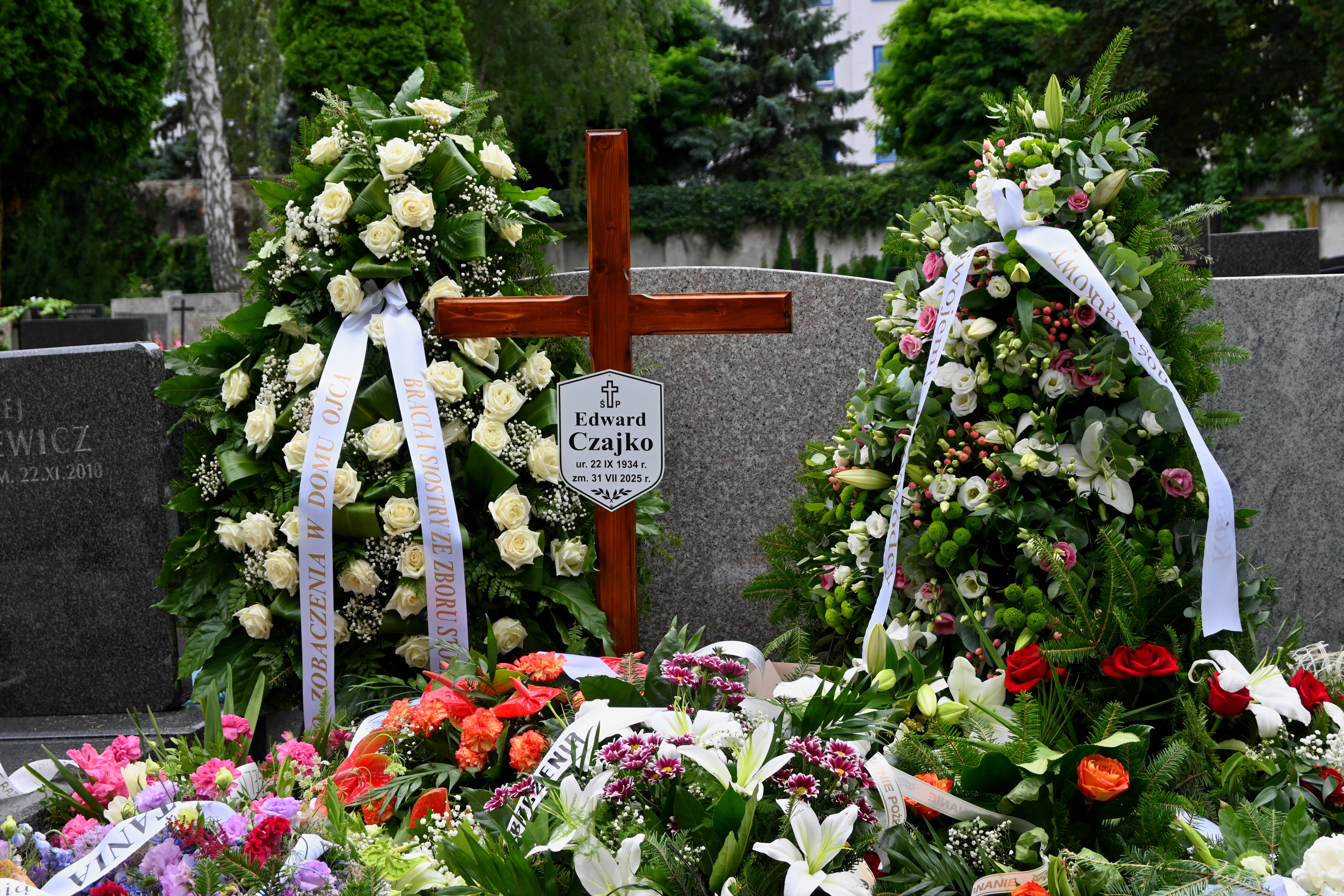
Grave of Edward Czajko at the Evangelical Reformed Cemetery in Warsaw on the day of his funeral

Czajko viewed Pentecostals as conservative evangelicals adhering to fundamentalist theology. He advocated for a classical and moderate form of Pentecostalism to preserve the church's character. From 1986, he frequently criticized aspects of the Charismatic movement, including the replacement of hymns about the cross with Old Testament-based refrains, a focus on temporal benefits over eternal ones, unbiblical demonology, Rema theology, and an obsession with novelty. In 1987, he critiqued David Yonggi Cho's teaching on positive confession, arguing that the Greek terms logos and rema both mean "word". In 1997, he criticized the Toronto Blessing and charismatic excess.

In 1989, following the fall of communism, he wrote: "There is an urgent need to strengthen ties with established Pentecostal churches and loosen connections with the so-called Pentecostal fringe, particularly the Rema movement and the positive confession movement, which are foreign to our Pentecostal tradition".

According to Mirosława Weremiejewicz, during the Polish People's Republic, Czajko maintained a compliant stance toward the authorities, claiming the church enjoyed full religious freedom. He described the martial law period as challenging only due to the temporary closure of Chrześcijanin. In 1992, he criticized Prime Minister Jan Olszewski for disrespecting his predecessors.

In 2005, after the publication of the Wildstein list, some Pentecostal clergy called for self-lustration using the Institute of National Remembrance archives. Czajko opposed this, arguing that the institute archives were products of a "demonic system".

== Publications ==
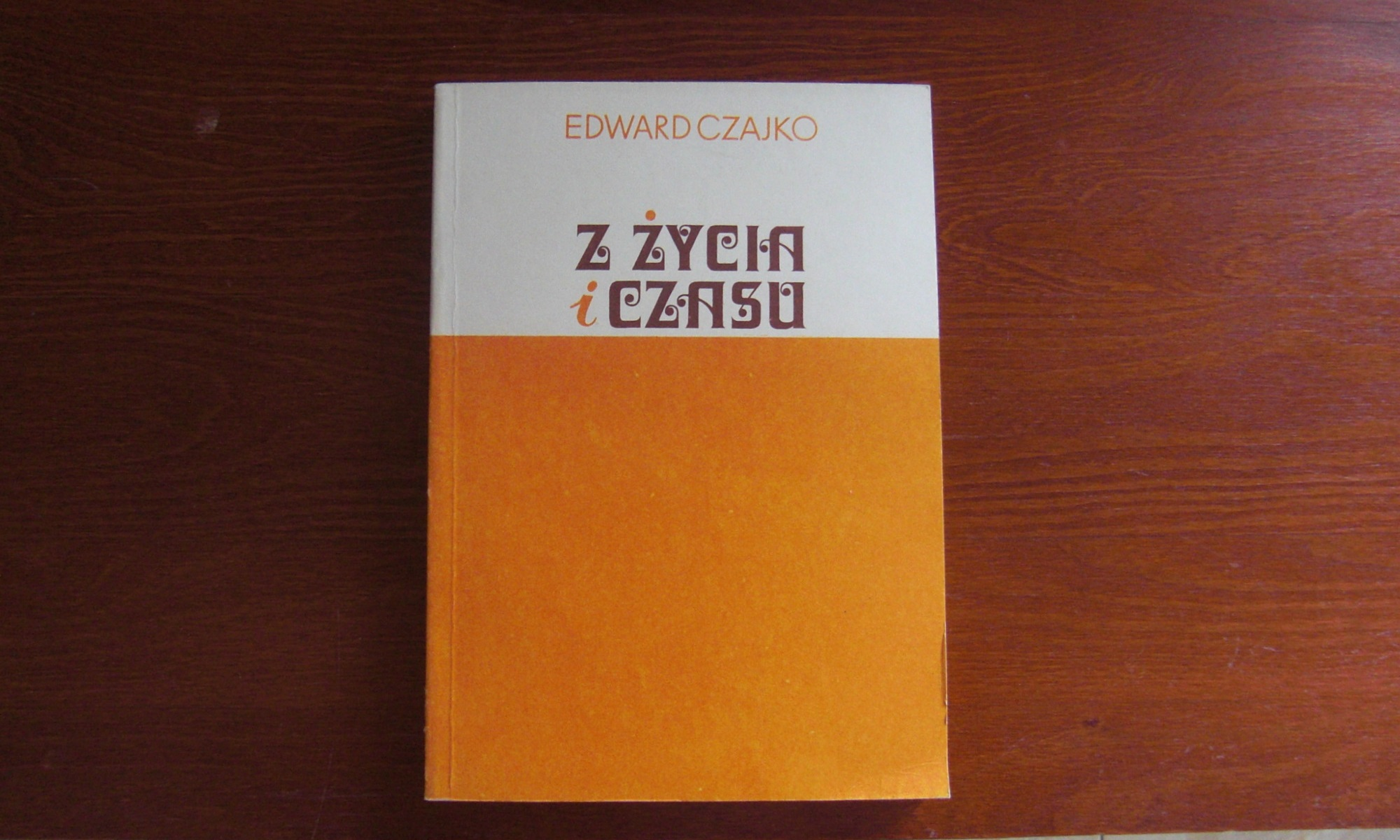
Cover of Edward Czajko's book Z życia i czasu (1983)

Czajko published over 700 books and articles. In 2012, Marek Kamiński noted that he had the most extensive body of work among Polish Pentecostal authors.

His publishing career began in 1962, when he and Mieczysław Kwiecień wrote articles for the United Evangelical Church's 1963 Kalendarz Jubileuszowy. They edited it substantively and technically, though Józef Mrózek Jr. and Bolesław Winnik were also listed as editors due to internal church politics.

- Chrześcijanie ewangeliczni w Polsce, Warsaw, 1967
- Wprowadzenie do dogmatyki, Warsaw, 1977; 2nd ed., Warsaw, 2000
- Stare i nowe rzeczy, Warsaw, 1980
- Z życia i czasu, Warsaw, 1983
- W przedsionkach Pańskich, Warsaw, 1987
- Kościół Zielonoświątkowy w Polsce, Warsaw, 1991
- Zasady wiary Kościoła Zielonoświątkowego w Polsce, Warsaw, 1991
- Zielonoświątkowcy, 1995
- Historia Jezusa Chrystusa i Dzieje Apostolskie, 1995
- Sytuacja ruchu zielonoświątkowego w perspektywie historycznej, Warsaw, 2000
- Miniatury egzegetyczne, Warsaw, 2001
- Tak oto biegnę, Warsaw, 2003
- Duchowe dary łaski, Warsaw, 2004
- Nasza wiara, Warsaw, 2009
- Ludzie i idee, Warsaw, 2009
- Nasza wiara. Próba dogmatyki zielonoświątkowej, Warsaw, 2014

== Controversies ==
In March 2017, Adam Ciućka, editor of Ekumenizm.pl, alleged that Czajko collaborated with the Security Service during the Polish People's Republic. Czajko responded that contacts with authorities, including Security Service officers, were a painful necessity of the time and not initiated by him. While necessary then, he acknowledged they appeared negative in hindsight. The Elders' Council of the Warsaw congregation defended him, arguing that Institute of National Remembrance archives provide only a partial historical record and reflect interpretations by Security Service officers.

== Awards ==
Czajko was awarded the Golden Cross of Merit and the Medal of the 40th Anniversary of People's Poland.

== Bibliography ==
- Czajko, Edward (2003). Tak oto biegnę [Thus I run] (in Polish). Warsaw: Instytut im. T.B. Barratta. ISBN 83-911470-3-7.
- Kamiński, Marek (2012). Kościół Zielonoświątkowy w Polsce w latach 1988-2008: Studium historyczno-ustrojowe [The Pentecostal Church in Poland in 1988–2008: A historical and institutional study] (in Polish). Warsaw: Warszawskie Seminarium Teologiczne. ISBN 978-83-905704-8-8.
- Tomaszewski, Henryk Ryszard (2009). Zjednoczony Kościół Ewangeliczny 1947-1987 [United Evangelical Church 1947–1987] (in Polish). Warsaw: KOMPAS II. ISBN 978-83-925744-5-3.
