= Anna Berger =

Anna Berger may refer to:

- Anna Berger (actress) (1922–2014), American actress
- Anna Maria Busse Berger, American academic and educator
