= Kaboli =

Kaboli (Persian: كابلي) may refer to:

== People ==
- Farzaneh Kaboli, Iranian dancer
- Iraj Kaboli, Iranian writer
- Mehrab Kaboli, fictional character in the Persian epic Shahnameh
- Mohsen Kaboli, Iranian-German robotics scientist
- Yadollah Kaboli Khansari, Iranian calligrapher

== Places ==
- Kaboli, Hormozgan
- Kaboli, Razavi Khorasan
- Kaboli, Togo

== See also ==
- Karoli (name)
