= Pawlica =

Pawlica is a Polish surname. Notable people with the surname include:

- Jan Pawlica (1923–1972), Polish alpine skier
- Karol Pawlica (1884–1970), Polish agronomist and diplomat
