= Henryk Tomaszewski =

Henryk Tomaszewski may refer to:

- Henryk Tomaszewski (mime) (1919–2001), Polish mime artist and theatre director
- Henryk Tomaszewski (poster artist) (1914–2005), Polish poster artist
- Henryk Ryszard Tomaszewski, Polish Protestant clergyman and church historian
