= Karoli (name) =

Karoli or Károli is a given name and a surname. Notable people known by this name include the following:

== Surname ==
- Gáspár Károli (1529?–1591), Hungarian Calvinist pastor
- Michael Karoli (1948–2001), German guitarist, violinist and composer
- Saida Karoli (born 1976), Tanzanian singer

== Given name ==
- Karoli Hindriks (born 1983), Estonian entrepreneur

== See also ==
- Kaboli (disambiguation)
- Kadoli (disambiguation)
- Kakoli (disambiguation)
- Kareli (disambiguation)
- Karli (name)
- Karol (name)
- Karola
- Karolin (name)
- Karolis
- Karolj
