= Emily S. Patterson =

American ergonomist and academic

- Occupations: Ergonomist and academic

Academic background
- Education: BS Industrial Engineering; MS Industrial & Systems Engineering; PhD Industrial & Systems Engineering
- Alma mater: University of Illinois Urbana-Champaign; The Ohio State University

Emily S. Patterson is an American ergonomist and academic. She is a professor in the Ohio State University College of Medicine.

Patterson's research is in the field of human factors engineering, with a focus on its application to health informatics and macrocognition to improve patient safety, and quality in healthcare. She co-edited the book Macrocognition Metrics and Scenarios: Design and Evaluation for Real-World Teams and is the recipient of the Alexander C. Williams, Jr., Award.

== Education ==
Patterson studied at the University of Illinois Urbana-Champaign and graduated with a BS in industrial engineering. She then undertook research in human factors at the Ohio State University and earned her MS in industrial and systems engineering in 1996, followed by a Ph.D. in 1999.

== Career ==
Patterson joined the Ohio State University College of Engineering as a visiting scholar in 2003 and held an appointment as a research scientist there from 2005 till 2009. In 2010, she was appointed as an assistant professor in the School of Health and Rehabilitation Sciences at Ohio State University and was promoted to associate professor in 2015, and professor in 2021. Previously, she was a research scientist at the Getting at Patient Safety (GAPS) Center at the Veteran's Administration Medical Center in Cincinnati.

Patterson was a scientific advisor on patient safety for the Joint Commission, the National Board of Medical Examiners, and the Society of Hospital Medicine.

== Research ==
Patterson has authored journal articles, conference papers, and book chapters. Her research has contributed to developing a national standard for summative usability testing for electronic health records in the United States, as well as accreditation standards for hospitals, medical residency programs, and shift change handovers.

=== Health informatics ===
Patterson's early work at NASA Johnson Space Center, resulting in a paper titled "Handoff strategies in settings with high consequences for failure: lessons for health care operations", provided insights on the characteristics of an effective patient handover. Much of her health information technology research focuses on improving patient safety in healthcare by utilizing human factors engineering, emphasizing streamlining workflows in hospital settings. Her work identified side effects from implementing health information technology, i.e., bar code medication administration, highlighting the significance of human factors engineering in workarounds. She extended this research with Kelly Neville and colleagues from The MITRE Corporation to create a conceptual framework for work system resilience to support Resilience-Aware Development and Transition.

Patterson is a key contributor to the technical reports published by the National Institute of Standards and Technology (NIST). She co-authored the national standard for summative usability testing for electronic health records (NIST 7804), that has been cooperatively published by the FDA and (NISTIR 7804–1).

Patterson worked on formulating a certificate for educating health science students regarding the use of methods in NIST technical reports and introduced it as an approved certificate program known as "Usability and User Experience in Healthcare" at the Ohio State University in 2020. Concentrated on addressing the telemetry alarm problem in the medical center, her joint work applied human factors engineering to the alarm problem. Her team developed an alarm classification system based on priority, an increased positive predictive value (PPV), and information content.

=== Macrocognitive communication ===
Another area of Patterson's work is communication during the transition of care. She conducts qualitative research using macrocognition as a conceptual framework, which has ramifications for health informatics. Together with Janet E. Miller, she has conducted research on the theoretical foundations of macrocognition, discussed a new set of macrocognitive metrics, and elaborated on how the metrics can be used in different approaches. In her 2016 ethnographic observational research, she investigated the differences in how the patient handovers were conducted by attending and resident physicians and later put an emphasis on the use of a macrocognition framework in the healthcare-built environment (HCBE). Research on HCBE has contributed to recommendations for more patient-centered and family-centered design of hospital rooms.

Patterson has also used macrocognition for conducting formative usability tests at the VHA, resulting in software changes for increased usability and patient safety. Her early research works have evaluated the patient handoff tool (PHT) for improving patient handoffs, showed how the technology-supported handovers could be optimized, and examined the influence of the computerized decision support on the ability to evaluate and supervise resident physician sign-outs.

Patterson has also conducted research on medical education accreditation. In a collaborative work with Ingrid Philibert from the Accreditation Council for Graduate Medical Education (ACGME), she defined high-quality patient handovers at the University Otolaryngologists/Otolaryngology Program Directors Organization meeting, and in a related effort, developed an online training course for resilient communication during the shift handovers.

== Awards and honors ==
- 2003 – Merit Review Entry Program (MREP) Career Development Award, Veteran's Administration Health Services Research and Development
- 2004 – Alexander C. Williams, Jr. Design Award, Human Factors and Ergonomics Society
- 2022 – HFE WOMAN Mentor of the Year, Human Factors and Ergonomics Society
- 2024 – Fellow, Human Factors and Ergonomics Society

== Bibliography ==
=== Books ===
- Macrocognition Metrics and Scenarios: Design and Evaluation for Real-World Teams (2012) ISBN 9781138072084

=== Articles ===
- Patterson, E. S., Cook, R. I., & Render, M. L. (2002). Improving patient safety by identifying side effects from introducing bar coding in medication administration. Journal of the American Medical Informatics Association, 9(5), 540–553.
- Woods, D. D., Patterson, E. S., & Roth, E. M. (2002). Can we ever escape from data overload? A cognitive systems diagnosis. Cognition, Technology & Work, 4, 22–36.
- Ebright, P. R., Patterson, E. S., Chalko, B. A., & Render, M. L. (2003). Understanding the complexity of registered nurse work in acute care settings. JONA: The Journal of Nursing Administration, 33(12), 630–638.
- Patterson, E. S., Roth, E. M., Woods, D. D., Chow, R., & Gomes, J. O. (2004). Handoff strategies in settings with high consequences for failure: lessons for health care operations. International journal for quality in health care, 125–132.
- Patterson, E. S., & Wears, R. L. (2010). Patient handoffs: standardized and reliable measurement tools remain elusive. The joint commission journal on quality and patient safety, 36(2), 52–61.
