= Karoli =

Karoli may refer to:

- Karoli (name)

== Places ==
- Karoli, Estonia, a village
- Karoli, Rewari, India, a village
- Karauli (formerly known as Karoli), India, a city

== See also ==
- Karola
- Karolin (name)
- Karolj
