= Herman Voldemar Reier =

Estonian engineer

Herman Voldemar Reier (14 May 1878 Uue-Võidu Parish – 29 October 1951 Narva) was an Estonian engineer and academic. He was one of the pioneers of Estonian technical vocabulary.

In 1901, he graduated from Strelitz Technical School in Germany, and in 1923 he graduated from Tallinn Polytechnical Institute.

From 1919 to 1932, he was the rector of Tallinn Polytechnical Institute. He was a journal editor and the author of textbooks.

During the post-war Soviet purge of Estonian educators, scientists, artists, writers and officials, Reier was arrested and sent to the Narva prison camp, where he died.
