= Masurian People's Party =

Masurian People's Party Mazurska Partia Ludowa (PL) Masurische Volkspartei (DE)
- Leader: Karol Bahrke
- Founder: Karol Bahrke; Michał Kajka; Bogumił Labusz; Gustaw Leyding
- Founded: November 8, 1896
- Dissolved: 1914
- Headquarters: Ełk (Lyck)
- Newspaper: Gazeta Ludowa (1896–1902); Mazur (1906–1914)
- Ideology: Agrarianism; Pro-Polish interests Centrism

The Masurian People's Party (Polish: Mazurska Partia Ludowa, MPL German: Masurische Volkspartei, MVP) was a pro-Polish agrarian political party active in Masuria between 1896 and 1914. The party was formed in 1896 but due to repression by the German police and local Prussian authorities, it did not adopt an official program until 1898.

The party was formed in response to, and was focused on opposing the policy of forced Germanization pursued by the Prussian authorities with regards to the Polish-speaking population of the region.

== Founding ==
The party was established in November 1896 by the publicist Karol Bahrke from Warsaw and the poet Michał Kajka in Ełk (Lyck). Its founding had been initiated by the "Central Committee for Silesia, Kaszubia and Masuria" (Polish: Komitet Centralny dla Śląska, Kaszub i Mazur) in Warsaw led by Antoni Osuchowski and Juliusz Bursche; the committee supported the foundation of the party financially and institutionally. Other notable founder members included the agrarian peasant activists Bogumił Labusz and Gustaw Leyding. The first meeting of the founders at the house of Bahrke, on November 8, 1896, was dispersed by German police. However, before this occurred the delegates had managed to form a 30-member electoral committee.

The program of the party was not approved until January 25, 1898.

== Program ==
The party was centrist in nature and drew most of its support from Masurian Polish speaking peasants. The main points of its program concentrated on the protection of the Polish language in Masuria, opposition to Germanization, as well as ensuring freedom of religion (the party included both Catholics and Protestants). The program also focused on agrarian issues, including land reform, increased spending on rural infrastructure and progressive taxation.

In Ortelsburg (Szczytno), the town considered the party's heartland, the Masurian People's Party had 30 members in 1907. Andreas Kossert estimated there were a few hundred members in all of Masuria at most.

== Political and cultural activity ==
The official organ of the party was the newspaper Gazeta Ludowa, whose chief editor was Bahrke. The newspaper was subsidized by Polish banks from Greater Poland and most of the 2,500 copies (1897) were distributed free of charge. Gazeta Ludowa stopped being published in 1902. Another newspaper, Mazur, was published from 1906 on in Ortelsburg (Szczytno) where Marcin Biedermann, a Polish banker from Poznań, acquired a printer. The number of copies, again distributed free of charge, rose from 500 in 1908 to 2,000 before the start of World War I.

== Election results ==
In the 1898 German federal election, Bahrke received 229 out of 17,832 votes in the district of Oletzko-Lyck-Johannisburg (Olecko-Ełk-Pisz). Eugen Zenon Lewandowski, the candidate in the Ortelsburg-Sensburg (Szczytno-Mragowo) district received 5,874 votes, around a third of the total. He had also been supported by the German Free-minded People's Party with about 4,000 votes. In the 1903 German federal election, Lewandowski received about 4,000 votes, Bogumił Labusz, who replaced Bahrke as a candidate received only 130. The number of votes dropped further to 1,451 in the 1907 German federal elections, when the candidates of the German Conservative Party were elected with 93.1% (Oletzko-Lyck-Johannisburg) and 73.1% (Ortelsburg-Sensburg) of the vote, and slightly increased to 2,698 in 1912.

In the East Prussian provincial elections of 1925, the Masurian People's Party received 1,366 votes and in the 1928 German federal election, 298 votes.
