= Anna Maria Busse Berger =

American musicologist

Anna Maria Busse Berger (born March 8, 1949) is an American musicologist. Busse Berger received her PhD from Boston University in 1986, and since 1989 she has taught at University of California, Davis, where she is now a Distinguished Professor of Music. She is a scholar of Medieval and Renaissance History and Theory and is the former chair of the UC Davis music department. She was born in Hamburg, Germany, and has lived in the United States since 1976. She is married to the musicologist Karol Berger.

== Research ==
While she has published on a variety of topics within music scholarship, Busse Berger is best known as a scholar of medieval music and notation. Her first book, Mensuration and Proportion Signs: Origins and Evolution, examines mensural notation and relates this system to other measuring systems of the period, in particular the Roman system of fractions. Her second book on Medieval Music and the Art of Memory is the first detailed study of music and memory in the Middle Ages. In this book Busse Berger examines the relationship between oral and written music traditions in the earliest stages of written notation, and in the words of one reviewer, her primary argument is that "the act of composing [during the Middle Ages] entailed the process of gathering and redistributing materials stocked in one's memory," in the context of particular medieval ideas about how memory worked.

In recent years Busse Berger has published extensively on global music. Her book In Search of Medieval Music in Africa and Germany: Scholars, Singers, and Missionaries 1891-1961 was published by the University of Chicago Press in 2020. In addition, she was awarded a grant of $210,000 with Henry Spiller from the Henry Luce Foundation for a Music History of Indonesia.

== Awards ==
Busse Berger was the 1991 recipient of the American Musicological Society's Alfred Einstein Award for best article by a young scholar. In 1997-98 she was a Guggenheim Fellow, In 2001-02 she was a fellow at the National Endowment for Humanities, the Stanford Humanities Center.

In 2006, her book, Medieval Music and the Art of Memory was awarded the ASCAP Deems Taylor Award, and the Wallace Berry Award from the Society of Music Theory.

In 2014, Busse Berger was a Colin Slim Award recipient for best article by a senior scholar from the American Musicological Society, as well as the Bruno Nettl Prize from the Society of Ethnomusicology, for her work on music in African missions.

In 2015-16 Busse Berger was a fellow at the Wissenschaftskolleg zu Berlin. She was elected Honorary Member of the American Musicological Society in 2019 and received the Outstanding Teaching Award from the UC Davis Honors Program in 2019.
