= Karola =

Karola is a Danish, Finnish, German, Hungarian, Norwegian, and Swedish feminine given name that is a feminine form of Karol and Carolus and an alternate form of Carola. Notable people with the name include the following:

== Given name ==
- Karola Bloch (1905–1994), Polish architect, socialist and feminist
- Karola Ebeling (born 1935), German actress
- Karola Fings (born 1962), German historian
- Karola Gramann (born 1948), German film scholar and film curator
- Karola Jovanović (1879–1958), Austrian operatic soprano
- Karola Maier Milobar (born 1876), Croatian physician
- Karola Mészáros, American mathematician
- Karola Neher, alternative name of Carola Neher (1900–1942), German actress and singer
- Karola Obermueller (born 1977), German composer and teacher
- Karola Schustereder (born 1966), Austrian rower
- Karola Siegel, birthname of Ruth Westheimer (1928–2024; known as "Dr. Ruth"), German-American sex therapist, talk show host, author, professor, Holocaust survivor and former Haganah sniper
- Karola Schustereder (born 1966), Austrian rower
- Karola Stange (born 1959), German politician
- Karola Stotz (1963–2019), German scholar
- Karola Sube (born 1964), German gymnast
- Karola Szulc, birthname of Caroline Schultze (born 1866), Polish physician
- Karola Theill, German pianist
- Karola Zala (1879–1970), Hungarian actress

== Middle name ==
- Princess Margarete Karola of Saxony (1900–1962), German royal
- Princess Feodora Karola Charlotte Marie Adelheid Auguste Mathilde of Saxe-Meiningen (1890–1972), German royal

== See also ==
- Carola
- Karla (name)
- Karol (name)
- Karole
- Karolj
- Károly
- Karoli (disambiguation)
- Karula (disambiguation)
