= Karole =

Karole is a given name. Notable people with the name include:

- Karole Armitage (born 1954), American dancer and choreographer
- Karole Hogarth, New Zealand nursing professor
- Karole Rocher (born 1974), French actress
- Karole Vail (born 1959), American museum director, curator, and writer

== See also ==
- Karol (name)
- Karola
- Karolj
