= Kadoli =

Kadoli may refer to the following places in India :

- Kadoli, Karnataka, a village
- Kadoli State, a former princely state in Saber Kantha thana, Mahi Kantha, Gujarat
- Kadoli, Maharashtra, a small town in the Hingoli district of Maharashtra

== See also ==
- Karoli (name)
