= Károly =

- Gender: masculine
- Language: Hungarian
- Name day: January 28, November 4

Other gender
- Feminine: Karola, Karolina

Origin
- Language: Germanic
- Meaning: Free man

Other names
- Nickname: Karcsi
- Cognate: Carolus
- Anglicisation: Charles

Károly (Hungarian pronunciation: [ˈkaːroj]) is a common Hungarian male given name. It is also sometimes found as a Hungarian surname. Károly is considered the equivalent of English Karl or Charles (because the Latin Carolus is very close to Károly).

== Given names ==
- Charles I of Hungary (1288–1342), in Hungarian Károly Róbert, King of Hungary and Croatia
- Károly Aggházy (1855–1918), Hungarian piano virtuoso and composer
- Károly Andrássy (1792–1845), Hungarian politician
- Károly Bajkó (1944–1997), Hungarian Olympic wrestler
- Károly Balzsay (born 1979), Hungarian boxer
- Károly Bartha (Minister of Defence) (1884–1964), Hungarian colonel general and politician
- Károly József Batthyány (1697–1772), Hungarian general, field marshal and ban (viceroy) of Croatia
- Károly Binder (born 1956), Hungarian jazz pianist, composer and educator
- Károly Brocky (1808–1855), Hungarian painter
- Károly Doncsecz (1918–2002), Slovene potter
- Károly Ecser (1931–2005), Hungarian weightlifter
- Károly Eperjes (born 1954), Hungarian actor
- Károly Erős (born 1971), Hungarian footballer
- Károly Ferencz (1913–1984), Hungarian wrestler
- Károly Ferenczy (1862–1917), Hungarian painter
- Károly Frenreisz (born 1946), Hungarian singer and songwriter
- Károly Gesztesi (1963–2020), Hungarian actor
- Károly Grósz (1930–1996), Hungarian politician
- Károly Hieronymi (1836–1911), Hungarian engineer and politician
- Károly Horvath (born 1947), Hungarian singer known as Charlie
- Károly Kárpáti (1906–1996), Hungarian Olympic wrestling
- Károly Kerkapoly (1824–1891), Hungarian politician and Minister of Finance
- Károly Kernstok (1873–1940), Hungarian painter
- Károly Kisfaludy (1788–1830), Hungarian dramatist and artist
- Károly Kiss, multiple people
- Károly Knezić (1808–1849), Hungarian Army general
- Károly Kós (1883–1977), Hungarian architect, writer, illustrator, ethnologist and politician
- Károly Leiningen-Westerburg (1819–1849), German general in the Hungarian Army
- Károly Lotz (1833–1904), German-Hungarian painter
- Károly Makk (1925–2017), Hungarian film director and screenwriter
- Károly Markó the Elder (1793–1860), Hungarian painter
- Károly Potemkin (born 1977), Hungarian footballer
- Károly Reich (1922–1988), Hungarian artist
- Károly Sándor (1928–2014), Hungarian footballer
- Károly Simonyi (1916–2001), Hungarian physicist, father of Charles Simonyi
- Károly Szabó (1916–1964), Austro-Hungarian assistant of Raoul Wallenberg in rescuing Hungarian Jews from the Holocaust
- Károly Takács (1910–1976), Hungarian Olympic sport shooter
- Károly Tersztyánszky (1854–1921), Austro-Hungarian general in World War I
- Károly Than (1834–1908), Hungarian chemist
- Károly Vécsey (1803–1849), Hungarian Army general
- Károly Zipernowsky (1853–1942), Austrian-born Hungarian engineer

== Surnames ==
- David Karoly (born 1955), Australian atmospheric scientist
- Jenő Károly (1886–1926), Hungarian footballer

== See also ==
- Károlyi, a Hungarian surname
- Karoli (disambiguation)
- Karola
- Karolj
