= Kareli =

Kareli may refer to:

- Kareli, Allahabad, a neighborhood in Allahabad, Uttar Pradesh, India
- Kareli District, a district of Georgia in the region of Shida Kartli
- Kareli, Georgia, a town in Shida Kartli District
- Kareli, Madhya Pradesh, a town in Narsinghpur district in Madhya Pradesh, India

== See also ==
- Karoli (name)
