= Henryk Ryszard Tomaszewski =

Polish Protestant clergyman and church historian

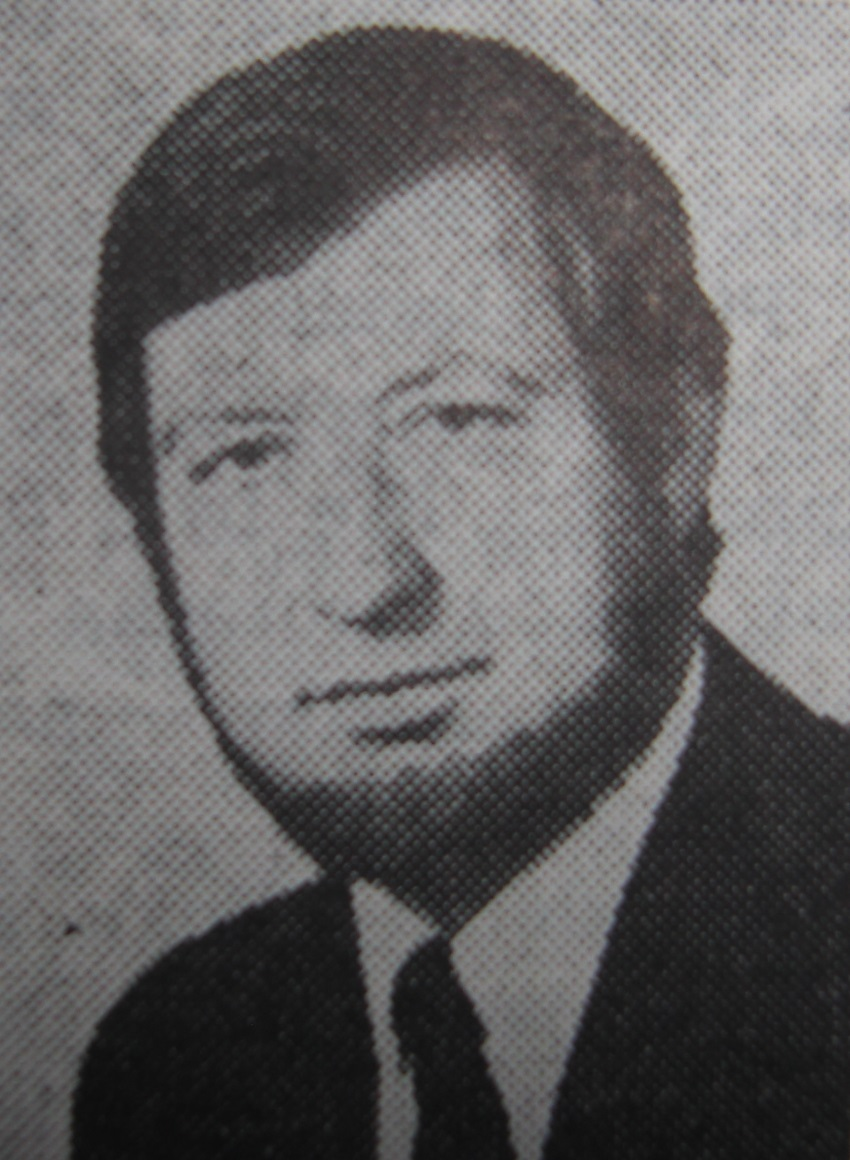
- Henryk Ryszard Tomaszewski (1988)
- Born: November 1, 1948 (age 77); Olsztyn
- Religion: Protestantism
- Church: Church of Christ in Poland

Henryk Ryszard Tomaszewski (born 1 November 1948 in Olsztyn) is a Polish Protestant clergyman, church historian specializing in the history of Polish evangelical communities, ecumenist, publisher of the Ecumenical Translation of Friends, and businessman. He served as secretary in the leadership of the United Evangelical Church and the Church of Christ, worked in the editorial teams of the monthly magazine Chrześcijanin and the quarterly Słowo i Życie, and engaged in scholarly activities. Some of his conclusions as a researcher have faced criticism from other scholars. He donated the archives he collected on the United Evangelical Church and the Church of Christ to the Central Archives of Modern Records.

== Biography ==
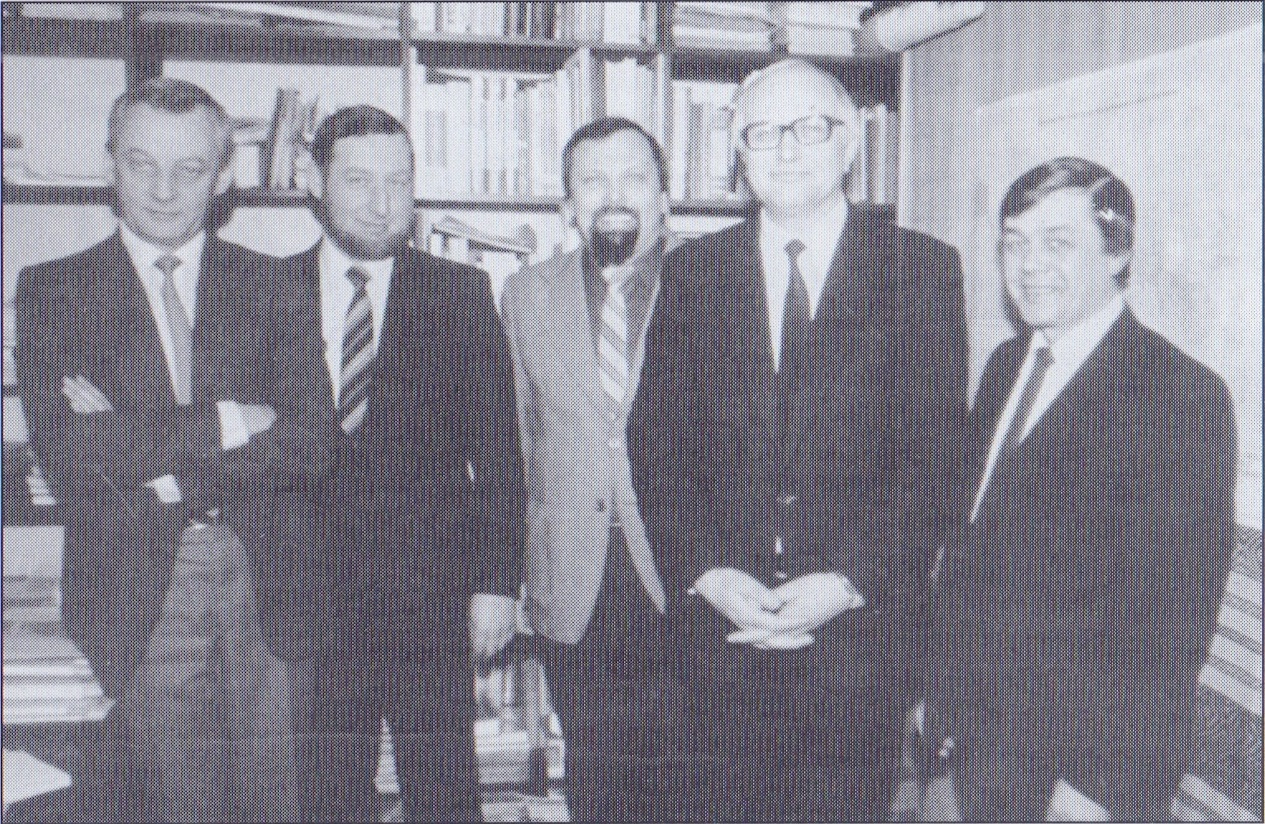
The final editorial team of Chrześcijanin from the United Evangelical Church era (1988), standing from left: Mieczysław Kwiecień, Henryk Ryszard Tomaszewski, Mieczysław Czajko, Edward Czajko, and Kazimierz Krystoń

He was born on 1 November 1948 in Olsztyn.

He graduated from the Christian Theological Academy in Warsaw, earning his master's degree in 1974. Under the supervision of Rev. Prof. Woldemar Gastpary, he wrote his doctoral dissertation titled Christian Groups of the Evangelical-Baptist Type in Poland from 1858 to 1939 and defended it in 1981. Later, he authored an unpublished work, Evangelical-Baptist Communities After 1939. He was the only Doctor of Theology in the United Evangelical Church.

From 1970 to 1975, he worked in the editorial team of the radio program Głos Ewangelii z Warszawy and in the publishing department of the United Evangelical Church. From 1975 to 1988, he was a member of the editorial team of the monthly Chrześcijanin. In 1981, at the 10th Synod of the United Evangelical Church, the Church of Christ faction nominated two candidates for the position of Church Council Secretary (H. Rother-Sacewicz and H. Tomaszewski). Sacewicz withdrew his candidacy, and Edward Czajko presented Tomaszewski's candidacy to the synod. During the vote, 161 delegates voted "for", 1 voted "against", and 16 abstained. He served as United Evangelical Church Council Secretary for two terms until 1987. He also served as secretary of the Aid Committee of the Polish Ecumenical Council. In 1983 and 1988, he participated in official meetings between Pope John Paul II and representatives of the Polish Ecumenical Council.

At the final 12th Synod of the United Evangelical Church, he voted against its dissolution, arguing that disbanding the United Evangelical Church was not a sensible decision. At the 1st Synod of the Church of Christ, he was elected Church Council Secretary and served in that role until 1992. From 1987 to 1992, he was also the editor-in-chief of the quarterly Słowo i Życie. He supported the Church of Christ's membership in the Polish Ecumenical Council. In 2004, he resigned his membership in the Church of Christ. For several years, he was a lecturer at the Warsaw Baptist Theological Seminary.

From 1984 to 2012, he was the publisher of the Ecumenical Translation of Friends.

He is also engaged in business activities and is one of the founders of the company Organic Farma Zdrowia SA.

== Archives ==
Due to the nature of his scholarly work, he spent considerable time in archives. From 1990 to 1991, he reviewed the resources of the Central Archive of the Central Committee of the Polish United Workers' Party (these documents were later transferred to the Central Archives of Modern Records, though Tomaszewski claims not all were handed over). From 1990 to 1993, he examined documents from the Central Archive of the Ministry of Internal Affairs. He also utilized the archives of the Central Archives of Modern Records, the Institute of National Remembrance, and others.

As United Evangelical Church Council Secretary, he amassed archival material on the United Evangelical Church, which he later donated to the Central Archives of Modern Records. He also donated original documents of the United Churches of Christ from 1928 to 1953, received from Jerzy Sacewicz.

== Scholarly work ==
He focused on the histories of the Baptist Christian Church of the Republic of Poland, the United Evangelical Church, and the Church of Christ. He typically referred to evangelical churches as "free churches" and adopted the definition proposed by Mieczysław Kwiecień. He argued that the primary distinction between evangelical and historical churches lies in the creation of a new form of piety and lifestyle. There are minor dogmatic differences between them, mainly regarding the understanding of believer's baptism, the Eucharist, and baptism in the Holy Spirit. These churches emphasize faith in Christ above all, rather than developing new dogmas.

Tomaszewski believed that reports from informants recruited within minority church communities were of little value, as such information was already available in church publications. He argued that the Ministry of Public Security aimed primarily to recruit agents within these communities to maintain a sense of control. He asserted that employees of the Departments of Religious Affairs and Internal Affairs "were not interested in the dogmatic or organizational matters of the monitored churches but in recruiting informants".

== Evaluations and criticism ==
Zachariasz Łyko reviewed his book Kościół Chrystusowy w Polsce w latach 1921–1953 (The Church of Christ in Poland in the Years 1921–1953, 1992), noting that it was based on extensive source material, typically from state archives of former religious and political authorities, describing this as an "extraordinary strength of the historical work".

In 2009, Tomaszewski published Zjednoczony Kościół Ewangeliczny 1947–1987 (United Evangelical Church 1947–1987). Jan Mironczuk praised it as a valuable resource for novice historians studying evangelical issues in the Polish People's Republic and those interested in the topic. However, he noted that Tomaszewski portrayed the Office for Religious Affairs as consistently obstructing the United Evangelical Church's operations, even placing Tadeusz Dusik – positively regarded by others – among problematic directors. He also depicted Szymon Biliński as nearly responsible for the arrests of United Evangelical Church activists in 1950. Tomaszewski listed 10 agents whose reports the Ministry of Public Security used for the 1950 arrests, though three were recruited after the arrests, and two provided no material.

Andrzej Seweryn reviewed his 2008 book Baptyści w Polsce w latach 1918–1958 (Baptists in Poland in the Years 1918–1958), commending its "wealth of sources" but criticizing its over-reliance on state archives and underuse of Baptist Church archives. He noted scant information on congregational activities, which he considered the essence of the church, while it focused heavily on the Supreme Church Council and its relations with the Ministry of Religious Affairs and Public Education pre-war and the Office for Religious Affairs post-war. Seweryn also criticized the extensive discussion of tangential issues (e.g., clergy repression in the Soviet Union, Bulgaria, and Czechoslovakia, and Office interference with the Christian Ecumenical Council) and noted that chapter summaries were mere restatements lacking synthesis or deep conclusions.

Ryszard Michalak considered him one of the most effective authors on religious minorities from 1945 to 1989, but faulted him for superficial archival research and ignoring existing literature. He deemed Tomaszewski's view – that religious authorities were uninterested in dogmatic or organizational matters – far removed from the realities of confessional policy, though he valued him for "other merits".

== Selected publications ==
- Wyznania typu ewangeliczno-baptystycznego wchodzące w skład Zjednoczonego Kościoła Ewangelicznego w latach 1945–1956 [Denominations of the Evangelical-Baptist Type Within the United Evangelical Church in the Years 1945–1956] (in Polish). Tomaszów Mazowiecki: Słowo i Życie. 1991. ISBN 83-88497-11-1.
- Kościół Chrystusowy w Polsce w latach 1921–1953 [The Church of Christ in Poland in the Years 1921–1953] (in Polish). Słowo i Życie. 1992.
- Baptyści w Polsce w latach 1858–1918 [Baptists in Poland in the Years 1858–1918] (in Polish). Warsaw: Kompas II. 1993.
- Wspólnoty chrześcijańskie typu ewangeliczno-baptystycznego na terenie Polski w latach 1858–1939 [Christian Communities of the Evangelical-Baptist Type in Poland in the Years 1858–1939] (in Polish). Warsaw: Warsaw Baptist Theological Seminary. 2006. ISBN 83-88497-11-1.
- Baptyści w Polsce w latach 1918–1958 [Baptists in Poland in the Years 1918–1958] (in Polish). Warsaw: Słowo i Życie. 2008. ISBN 9788392574422.
- Zjednoczony Kościół Ewangeliczny 1947–1987 [United Evangelical Church 1947–1987] (in Polish). Warsaw: KOMPAS II. 2009. ISBN 978-83-925744-5-3.

== Bibliography ==
- Mironczuk, Jan (2010). "Henryk Ryszard Tomaszewski, Zjednoczony Kościół Ewangeliczny 1947–1987" [Henryk Ryszard Tomaszewski, United Evangelical Church 1947–1987]. Przegląd Prawa Wyznaniowego (in Polish).
- Seweryn, Andrzej (2011). "Henryk Ryszard Tomaszewski, Baptyści w Polsce w latach 1918-1958, Warszawa 2008, ss. 516" [Henryk Ryszard Tomaszewski, Baptists in Poland in the Years 1918-1958, Warsaw 2008, 516 pp.]. Studia z Prawa Wyznaniowego (in Polish). 14.
- Tomaszewski, H.R. (2009). Zjednoczony Kościół Ewangeliczny 1947–1987 [United Evangelical Church 1947–1987] (in Polish). Warsaw: KOMPAS II. ISBN 978-83-925744-5-3.
