= Karl Ignatius Lorinser =

Austrian physician

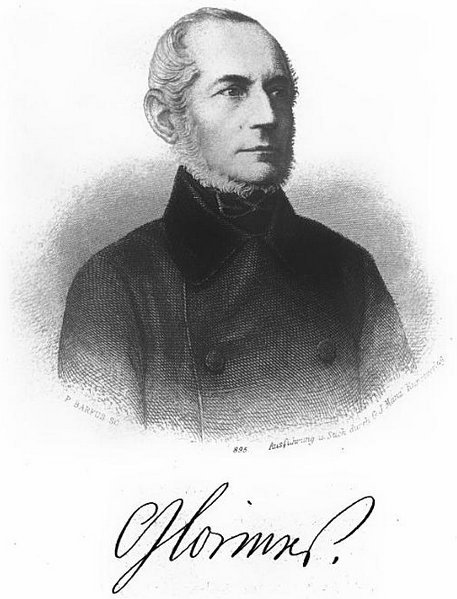
Karl Ignatius Lorinser

Karl Ignatius Lorinser (1796–1853), also known as Carl Ignaz Lorinser, was a medical doctor from the Austrian Empire.
