= Karol Bahrke =

- Born: 16 March 1868; Kingdom of Prussia
- Died: 1935 (aged 66–67); United States
- Occupations: Printer, Publisher

Karol Bahrke (March 16, 1868 – 1935) was a Polish printer and publisher.

He was born to Masurian parents.

== Early publishing career ==
In 1896 he bought a printing house, co-founded by Mazurska Partia Ludowa. His print shop's main press release was "Gazeta Ludowa" ("People's Gazette") with a circulation of 2,000 copies, where he was the editor. As newspapers had political implications, Bahrke was threatened with the punishment of imprisonment and in 1898 he left and immigrated permanently to the United States.
