= Karula, Viljandi County =

Village in Estonia

Karula
- Village
- Location in Estonia
- Coordinates: 58°24′09″N 25°36′45″E
- Country: Estonia
- County: Viljandi County
- Municipality: Viljandi Parish

Population (01.01.2010)
  - Total: 197

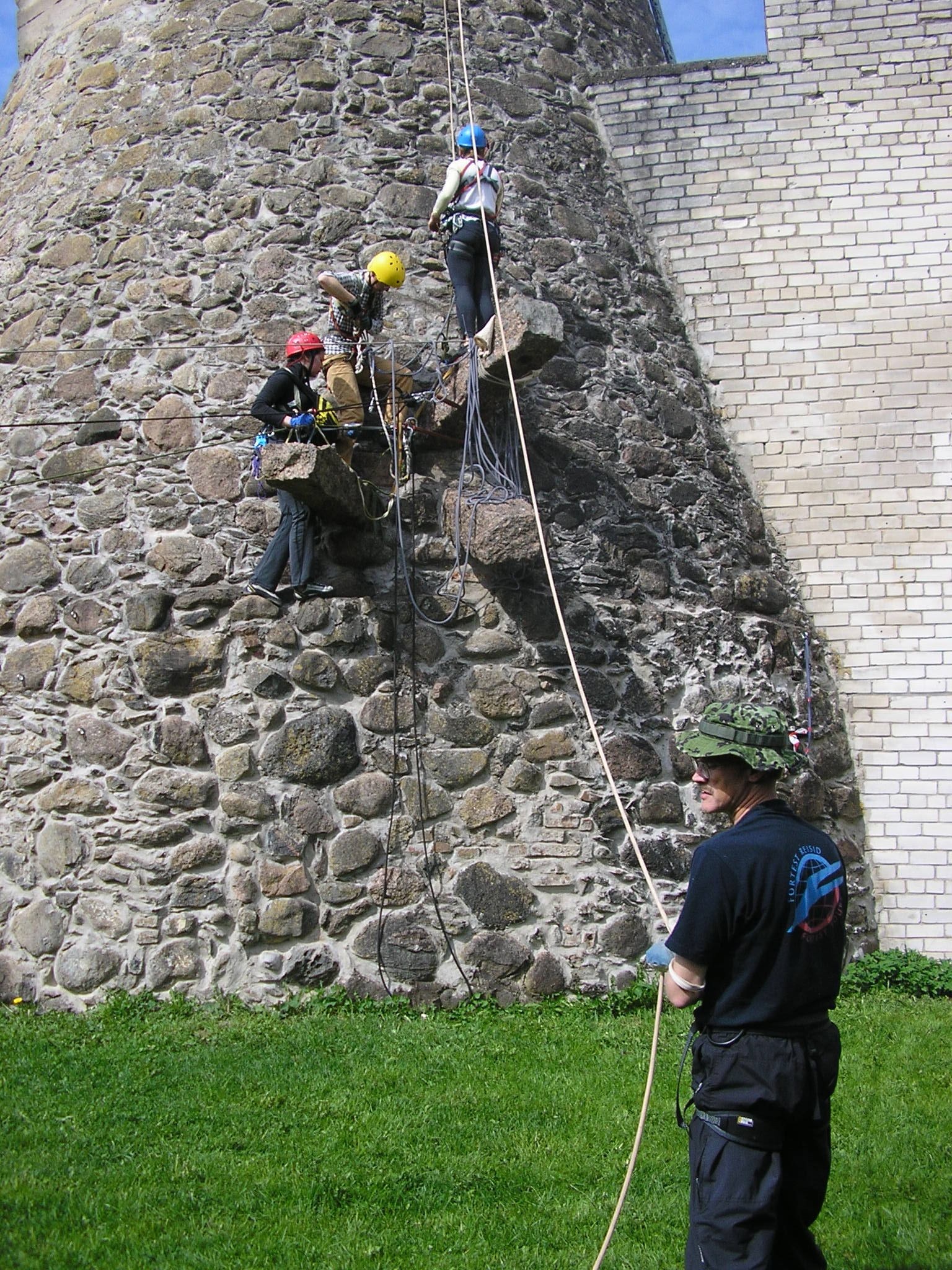
Climbing on the old mill

Karula (formerly: Uue-Võidu) is a village in Viljandi Parish, Viljandi County, Estonia. It has a population of about 197 (as of 1 January 2010). It was a part of Saarepeedi Parish until 2013.

Politicians Jüri Jaakson (1870–1942) and Jüri Parik (1889–1929) were born in Karula, as was civil engineer and academic Hermann Voldemar Reier (1878–1948).
