= Karol G. Ross =

American psychologist (born 1952)

- Born: July 17, 1952 (age 73); North Carolina, U.S.
- Education: University of Tennessee (PhD)
- Occupation: Scientist
- Scientific career
- Fields: Psychology

Karol Girdler Ross (born July 17, 1952, in North Carolina) is a leading scientist in decision-making research. She received her Ph.D. in experimental psychology from the University of Tennessee and is now a chief scientist for Cognitive Performance Group of Florida and a research psychologist at the Institute for Simulation and Training (IST) at the University of Central Florida. She is currently serving a two-year appointment on the U.S. Army TRADOC Distance Learning Training Technology Subcommittee of The Army Distributed Learning Program and serves on the Defense Regional and Cultural Capabilities Assessment Working Group-Learning Objectives Subgroup. She has conducted research and development for the US Army, the USMC, the US Air Force and the Office of Naval Research. Currently at IST, she provides senior scientist oversight for the USMC R&D Program for Cognitive Skills Training for IED Defeat. Her work currently deals with the oversight of extensive cognitive task analysis of IED Defeat performance, the development and evaluation of performance metrics, multiple training interventions, training effectiveness evaluation, and modeling of cross-cultural competence.

== Publications ==
=== Technical reports ===
- Phillips, J.K., Ross, K.G., & Shadrick, S.B. (2006). User's Guide for Tactical Thinking Behaviorally Anchored Rating Scales. (RP 2006–05; ADA452069). Alexandria, VA: U.S. Army Research Institute for the Behavioral and Social Sciences.
- Phillips, J. K., Shafer, J., Ross, K. G., & Cox, D. A. (2006). Behaviorally anchored rating scales for the assessment of tactical thinking mental models. (RR 1854). Alexandria, VA: U.S. Army Research Institute for the Behavioral and Social Sciences.
- O'Dea, A., Ross, K.G., McHugh, A, Phillips, J.K., Throne, M.H., & McCloskey, M., & Mill, J.A. (2006). Global teams: Enhancing the performance of multinational staffs through collaborative online training (RR 1849; AD A469425). Alexandria, VA:U.S. Army Research Institute for the Behavioral and Social Sciences.
- Baxter, H. C., Ross, K. G., & Stevens, L. M. (2005). Capturing and transferring tacit knowledge for the battle command knowledge system (Final Technical Report prepared for the U.S. Army and Booz Allen Hamilton under Subcontract #82059nbs21, Prime #GS-35F-0306). Fairborn, OH: Klein Associates.
- Ross, K. G., Phillips, J. K., Klein, G., & Cohn, J. (2005). Creating expertise: A framework to guide technology-based training (Final Technical Report for Contract #M67854-04-C-8035 for the Marine Corps Systems Command Program Manager for Training Systems, Orlando, FL). Fairborn, OH: Klein Associates.
- Harris-Thompson, D., Mills, J. A., Ross, K. G., Peluso, D. A., Baxter, H. C., & McCloskey, M. (2004). eMAGINE: electronic Medium for Authoring and Generating Instructional Exercises (Final Technical Report under Contract No. N61339-02-C-0157 for NAVAIR-ORLANDO TSD). Fairborn, OH: Klein Associates.
- Ross, K. G., Battaglia, D., Hutton, R. J. B., & Crandall, B. (2003). Development of an Instructional Model for Tutoring Tactical Thinking. (Phase II SBIR). Stottler Henke Associates Inc. subcontract. Sponsored by the Army Research Institute, Fort Knox, Kentucky.

=== Journal articles ===
- Ross, K. G., Klein, G., Thunholm, P., Schmitt, J. F., & Baxter, H. C. (2004). The recognition-primed decision model. Military Review, LXXIV(4), 6–10.
- Klein, G., Ross, K. G., Moon, B., Klein, D. E., Hoffman, R. R., Hollnagel, E. (2003). Macrocognition. IEEE Intelligent Systems, 81–85.
- Notar, C. E., Wilson, J. D., & Ross, K. G. (2002). Distant learning for the development of higher-level cognitive skills. Education, 122(4), 642–647.
- Ross, K. G. (2000). Training adaptive leaders-are we ready? Field Artillery Journal, 15–18.
- Ross, K. G., Pierce, L. G., Corpac, P. S., & Fulton, C. T. (1999). New wine in new bottles—Revitalizing battle staff training. Field Artillery, May–June, 12–15.

=== Book chapters ===
- Peters, D. J., Jackson, L. A., Phillips, J. K., & Ross, K. G. (2008). The time to decide: How awareness and collaboration affect the command decision making process. In A. Kott (Ed.), Battle of Cognition: The Future Information-Rich Warfare and the Mind of the Commander. Westport, Connecticut: Praeger Security International.
- Harris, W. C., Ross, K. G., & Hancock, P. A. (2008). Changes in soldier's information processing capability under stress. In P. A. Hancock and J. L. Szalma (Eds.), Performance Under Stress. Burlington, VT: Ashgate Publishing Company. 361 Interactive, LLC Topic # A07-050 Proposal # A2-342036
- Ross, K. G., Shaffer, J. L., & Klein, G. (2006). Professional judgments and "naturalistic decision making." In K. A. Ericsson, N. Charness, R. R. Hoffman, and P. J. Feltovich (Eds.), The Cambridge Handbook of Expertise and Expert Performance. New York: Cambridge University Press.
- Ross, K. G., Lussier, J. W., & Klein, G. (2004). From recognition-primed decision making to decision skills training. In S. Haberstroh & T. Betsch (Eds.), Routines of decision making. Mahwah, NJ: Lawrence Erlbaum Associates.
