= Karol Fryzowicz =

Polish footballer (born 1991)

Personal information
- Full name: Karol Fryzowicz
- Date of birth: 27 March 1991 (age 35)
- Place of birth: Głogów, Poland
- Height: 1.70 m (5 ft 7 in)
- Position: Right-back

Team information
- Current team: Odra Ścinawa

Youth career
- Górnik Polkowice
- 2007: Zagłębie Lubin

Senior career*
Years	Team	Apps	(Gls)
2007–2009	Zagłębie Lubin (ME)	32	(3)
2008	Zagłębie Lubin II	9	(1)
2009–2012	Zagłębie Lubin	5	(0)
2010	→ Chrobry Głogów (loan)	9	(1)
2011–2012	→ MKS Kluczbork (loan)	32	(3)
2012–2025	Górnik Polkowice	310+	(15+)
2025–2026	Odra Bytom Odrzański	26	(2)
2026–	Odra Ścinawa	0	(0)
- * Club domestic league appearances and goals as of 08:36, 26 June 2026 (UTC)

Karol Fryzowicz (born 27 March 1991) is a Polish professional footballer who plays as a right-back for IV liga Lower Silesia club Odra Ścinawa.

== Career ==
He is trainee of Górnik Polkowice. In the summer 2010, he was loaned to Chrobry Głogów from Zagłębie Lubin.

== Honours ==
Górnik Polkowice

- II liga: 2020–21
- III liga, gr. III: 2018–19
- Polish Cup (Legnica regionals): 2017–18, 2023–24

Odra Bytom Odrzański

- IV liga Lubusz: 2025–26
