= Karolj =

Karolj is a Hungarian masculine given name. Notable people referred to by this name include the following:

== Given name ==
- Karolj Kasap (born 1954), Serbian wrestler
- Karolj Kopas (born 1958), Yugoslav wrestler

== See also ==
- Karol (name)
- Karola
- Karole
- Karoli (disambiguation)
- Károly
- Karolju
