= Kakoli, Fars =

Kakoli كاكلي
- Village
- Location within Iran
- Coordinates: 27°19′16″N 53°16′33″E
- Country: Iran
- Province: Fars
- County: Lamerd
- Bakhsh: Central
- Rural District: Sigar

Population (2006)
  - Total: 203
- Time zone: UTC+3:30 (IRST)
  - Summer (DST): UTC+4:30 (IRDT)

Kakoli (Persian: كاكلي, also Romanized as Kākolī; also known as Kākūlī) is a village in Sigar Rural District, in the Central District of Lamerd County, Fars province, Iran. At the 2006 census, its population was 203, in 40 families.
