= Karol Radziwonowicz =

Polish pianist

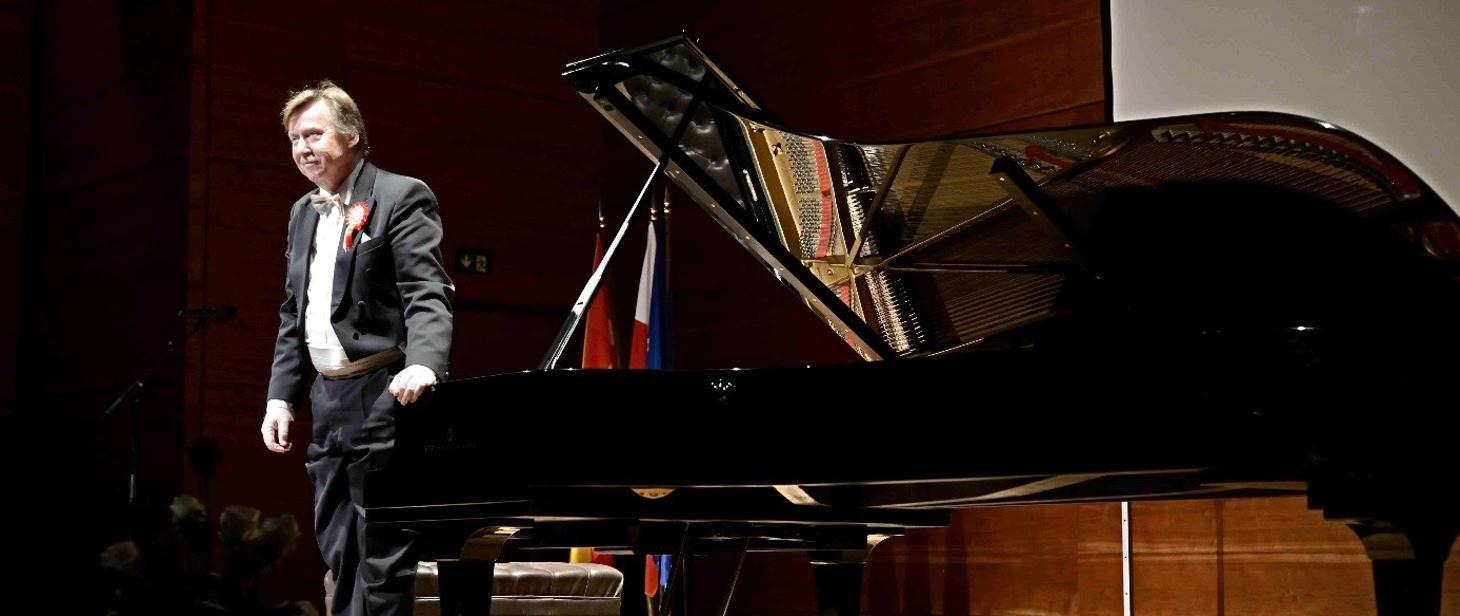
Karol Radziwonowicz

Karol Mikołaj Radziwonowicz (born 2 March 1958 in Warsaw) is a Polish pianist.

He graduated from the Fryderyk Chopin Academy of Music in Warsaw in 1982 and won a Fulbright scholarship to study under George Sebok in the School of Music of Indiana University in Bloomington (1987–1988).

Since then, he has become a distinguished pianist concerting in Poland and abroad. Radziwonowicz has been the first in the history of world recordings to record all of piano works of Ignacy Jan Paderewski, he is also famous for his interpretation of Frédéric Chopin and Karol Mikuli.
