= Kakoli, Bushehr =

Kakoli كاكلي
- Village
- Location within Iran
- Coordinates: 28°55′08″N 51°09′24″E
- Country: Iran
- Province: Bushehr
- County: Tangestan
- Bakhsh: Central
- Rural District: Baghak

Population (2006)
  - Total: 332
- Time zone: UTC+3:30 (IRST)
  - Summer (DST): UTC+4:30 (IRDT)

Kakoli (Persian: كاكلي, also Romanized as Kākolī; also known as Kākolkī and Kākuli) is a village in Baghak Rural District, in the Central District of Tangestan County, Bushehr Province, Iran. At the 2006 census, its population was 332, in 79 families.
