= Karol Wolfram =

Polish priest (1899–1965)

Karol Wolfram (5 November 1899 – 21 September 1965) was a Polish Evangelical priest from Warsaw and professor and pro-rector of the Christian Theological Academy in Warsaw.

He entered the Gymnasium (Władysława IV) in Warsaw; in 1920 he began his studies in Evangelical theology at the University of Warsaw. After graduating, he was ordained in 1924 and then worked as a vicar in Warsaw for a time. Later he became a provost in Nowy Dwór Mazowiecki, where he was an auxiliary chaplain to the Polish Army from 1926 to 1929. He completed his studies in Germany. After his return from Germany, he became assistant of the University of Warsaw, where he worked on the New Testament.

In 1935 he became a postgraduate university lecturer, and during World War II he taught at the clandestine Methodist Bible School in Poland.

Wolfram was part of the committee responsible for the Warsaw Bible, an Evangelical translation.

He died in Warsaw and was buried in the Evangelical cemetery there.
