= Karol Točík =

- Born: 21 September 1890; Austria-Hungary, Ústie nad Oravou
- Died: 9 May 1960 (aged 69); Czechoslovakia, Žilina
- Education: Ószeminárium, Esztergom

Karol Točík (* 1890, Ústie nad Oravou – † 1960, Žilina) was Slovak Roman Catholic priest and dean in Turzovka, and regional historian. He worked in Turzovka between 1917 and 1959. Karol Točík studied the history of Turzovka and the upper Kysuce region. He wrote several historical works prepared for printing, but due to the change in political system in Czechoslovakia in 1948, have never been published. He was the first historian of Kysuce region.

== Life ==
Born in Ústie nad Oravou (extinct village) in the Árva County of the Kingdom of Hungary (present-day Slovakia). Karol's parents were canvas producers who moved to Pap in the Veszprém County. Here young Karol lived from his four years. Primary schools and Gymnasium graduated in Pap. After studying in Seminary (Ószeminárium) in Esztergom and later in Nitra, he worked as a chaplain in Raková, Kolárovice, Nová Bystrica and Turzovka, where he was appointed as a pastor. He held this position for more than 40 years. During his work in Turzovka, he intensively devoted himself to historical research focusing on the history of Turzovka and Kysuce. He is buried in Turzovka.

== Heritage ==
- The Karol Točík Award, established in 2012 for an extraordinary contribution for research of Kysuce region, or its support in socio-disciplinary disciplines (archeology, history, ethnography, philology, archival science and auxiliary sciences of history).
- The Town Museum of Karol Točík in Turzovka, regional museum and first institution of this type in Turzovka.

== Work ==
- Cirkevné dejiny Turzovky a celých Kysúc
- Obyvatelia Turzovky, Olešnej, Vysokej, Podvysokej, Dlhej a Turkova roku 1694 – 1702
- Spor hraničný na Kysuciach
- Keď starý Jantulík zomieral
- Tereziánsky urbár 1770 a urbárska regulácia
