= Kaboli, Razavi Khorasan =

Kaboli كابلي
- Village
- Location within Iran
- Coordinates: 36°16′14″N 58°41′21″E
- Country: Iran
- Province: Razavi Khorasan
- County: Nishapur
- Bakhsh: Central
- Rural District: Mazul

Population (2006)
  - Total: 583
- Time zone: UTC+3:30 (IRST)
  - Summer (DST): UTC+4:30 (IRDT)

Kaboli (Persian: كابلي, also Romanized as Kābolī) is a village in Mazul Rural District, in the Central District of Nishapur County, Razavi Khorasan Province, Iran. At the 2006 census, its population was 583, in 151 families.
