= Macrocognition =

Macrocognition indicates a descriptive level of cognition performed in natural rather than artificial (laboratory) environments. This term is reported to have been coined by Pietro Cacciabue and Erik Hollnagel in 1995. However, it is also reported that it was used in the 1980s in European Cognitive Systems Engineering research. Possibly the earliest reference is the following, although it does not use the exact term "macrocognition":

A macro-theory is a theory which is concerned with the obvious regularities of human experience, rather than with some theoretically defined unit. To refer to another psychological school, it would correspond to a theory at the level of Gestalten. It resembles Newell’s suggestion for a solution that would analyse more complex tasks. However, the idea of a macro-theory does not entail an analysis of the mechanistic, materialistic kind which is predominant in cognitive psychology. Thus we should have a macro-theory of remembering rather than of memory, to say nothing of short-term memory, proactive inhibition release, or memory scanning. To take another example, we should have a macro-theory of attending, rather than a mini-theory of attention, or micro-theories of limited channel capacities or logarithmic dependencies in disjunctive reaction times. This would ease the dependence on the information processing analogy, but not necessarily lead to an abandonment of the information processing terminology, the Flowchart, or the concept of control structures. The meta-technical sciences can contribute to a psychology of cognition as well as to cognitive psychology. What should be abandoned is rather the tendency to think in elementaristic terms and to increase the plethora of mini-and micro-theories. ... To conclude, if the psychological study of cognition shall have a future that is not a continued description of human information processing, its theories must be at what we have called the macro-level. This means that they must correspond to the natural units of experience and consider these in relation to the regularities of human experience, rather than as manifestations of hypothetical information processing mechanisms in the brain. A psychology should start at the level of natural units in human experience and try to work upwards towards the level of functions and human action, rather than downwards towards the level of elementary information processes and the structure of the IPS.

The use of the term suggests that there is strong evidence that naturalistic decision-making and the environments in which they occur are navigated in cognitively different ways than artificial or controlled environments.

Macrocognition is distinguished from microcognition by elements of time pressure and risk, performance by experts (as opposed to college students or novices), ambiguity of goals and outcomes, and complex and unclear conditions.

== See also ==
- Metacognition
- Naturalistic decision-making
- Foltz, P. W., Bolstad, C. A., Cuevas, H. M., Franzke, M., Rosenstein, M., & Costello, A. M. (in press). Measuring situation awareness through automated communication analysis. To appear in M. Letsky, N. Warner, S. M. Fiore, & C. Smith (Eds.), Macrocognition in teams. Aldershot, England: Ashgate.
- Klein, G., Moon, B. and Hoffman, R.F. (2006b). Making sense of sensemaking II: a macrocognitive model. IEEE Intelligent Systems, 21(5), 88-92
- Klein, G., Ross, K. G., Moon, B., Klein, D. E., Hoffman, R. R., Hollnagel, E. (2003). Macrocognition. IEEE Intelligent Systems, 81-85.
