= Karol d'Abancourt de Franqueville (lawyer) =

Polish politician and lawyer (1851–1913)

Karol d'Abancourt de Franqueville (26 May 1851 – 16 August 1913) was a Polish politician and lawyer. He was born in Łówcza, Poland to Franciszek Ksawery d' Abancourt de Franqueville, a publisher and political activist. His family consisted mainly of French refugees.

His sense of patriotism was fostered not only by the political activities of his father, but also by the legacy of his uncle, Karol, who was hailed as a national hero. He attended school in Lwów, where he decided to attend university and study law. After completing his studies, he worked in the region of Galicia, especially in Bełz, Brody, Bolechów, Żurawno, and Lwów. He worked tirelessly as a social activist in every town where he practiced law. The town of Żurawno awarded him honorary citizenship in 1895.

From 1895 to 1900, he served as member of the Parliament of the Galician Galician Sejm, elected to represent Żydaczów. Initiatives he presented included bills regarding regulation of rivers and mountain streams. Though he belonged to no political party at that time (he later joined the National-Democratic Party), he was considered a nationalist, often pushing for the removal of Austrian influences from Galician politics.

As he aged he lost his sight and retired from public life. He died in August 1913 in Rabka-Zdrój.
