= Karol Berger =

Polish-American musicologist

Karol Berger (born 1947) is a Polish-American musicologist.

== Biography ==
Berger obtained his PhD from Yale University in 1975 and taught at Boston University from 1975 to 1982. He is currently a retired member of the Department of Music at Stanford University, where he holds the Osgood Hooker Professorship in Fine Arts. He is the recipient of awards from the Alfred Jurzykowski Foundation (1995) and the Swiss Musicological Society (the 2011 Glarean Award), and the Alexander von Humboldt Foundation (the 2014 Humboldt Research Award). He is a foreign member of the Polish Academy of Sciences, an honorary member of the American Musicological Society, a member of the American Academy of Arts and Sciences, a foreign member of the Polish Academy of Arts and Sciences (Cracow), and a foreign member of the Academia Europaea.

Berger’s work has focused on the vocal polyphony of the Renaissance, aesthetic theory, and Austro-German music from the early eighteenth to the early twentieth century.

He is married to the musicologist Anna Maria Busse Berger.

== Selected publications ==
- Berger, Karol (1981). "The Hand and the Art of Memory". Musica Disciplina. 35: 87–120. JSTOR 20532236.
- Musica Ficta (Cambridge University Press, 1987).
- A Theory of Art (Oxford University Press, 2000; Polish trans. 2008).
- Bach's Cycle, Mozart's Arrow: An Essay on the Origins of Musical Modernity (University of California Press, 2007).
- Beyond Reason: Wagner contra Nietzsche (Oakland, CA: University of California Press, 2017).
- Mahler's Symphonic World: Music for the Age of Uncertainty (Chicago and London: The University of Chicago Press, 2025).

== Awards ==
- Recipient of the 1988 Otto Kinkeldey Award of the American Musicological Society.
- Recipient of the 2008 Marjorie Weston Emerson Award of the Mozart Society of America.
- Recipient of the 2018 Otto Kinkeldey Award of the American Musicological Society.
