= Karola Maier Milobar =

Karola Maier Milobar (born 1876) became the first female physician to practice in Croatia in 1906. She had graduated from the University of Zürich in 1900. She worked at a place on the street called Berislavićeva in Zagreb from 1906 until 1945. It was the first private clinic for diseases of the digestive structures and female organs in Zagreb.
