= Karol Pawlica =

Polish diplomat (1884–1970)

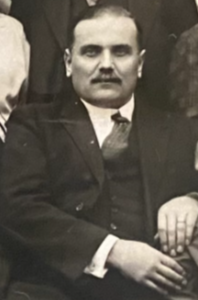
Karol Pawlica

Karol Pawlica (12 March 1884 – 17 September 1970) was a Polish patriot, agronomist, diplomat and lieutenant in the Imperial and Royal Austro-Hungarian army. He was dubbed "Samurai from Niebory".

== Biography ==
Pawlica was born on 12 March 1884 in Niebory. He was the oldest son of Karol Pawlica – a farmer from the Żuków Górny and Anna from Stonawski family. An agricultural school student in Mistrzowice, after he graduated agricultural economy course in Kocobędz. He attended high school in Cieszyn, in the years 1900–1903 he studied at the renowned school of modern agricultural economy in Horní Heřmanice (part of Bernartice). Since 1904 he worked as a lecturer in an inspector in the Larisch-Mönnich estate.

In 1914 he was drafted as a lieutenant reserve in the Imperial and Royal Austro-Hungarian army. In 1915 he was captured by the Russians and was sent to the Asian part of the Russian Empire. After his release from captivity, he developed a plan to save Polish orphans from a local Siberian orphanage. After traversing the wilderness of Siberia on 24 July 1920, he arrived with a group of 41 Polish orphans at the Tokyo headquarters of the Japanese Red Cross. On that day the "Official establishment of the welfare of Polish children" was established by J. Okakura - Attaché president of the Japanese Red Cross. For his heroic deed he was honored with the Order of Samurai. Due to his efforts the saved Polish orphans were taken on board a merchant ship on to the US, where they were taken by Polish expatriates. After coming to America Charles Pawlica was employed at the Polish consulate in Chicago.

A year later he returned to Poland, where he was directed by the Ministry of the former Prussian District in Warsaw to work in the Department of Agriculture and National Patrimony of the Pomorskie Regional Office in Toruń starting on the 6 May 1921. Five months later he was promoted to the rank of Consul Governor of Pomerania. In the 1930s he retired and became a member of the Alma Mater in Czechoslovakia with ID number 008950. He lived in Cieszyn at Słowackiego 1 Street.

During the German occupation, he hid in the General Government in Warsaw. After the war he returned to the family in Niebory. The Czechoslovak National Council (Národní výbor), granted him Czechoslovak citizenship in 1945 (Nebory and whole Trans-Olza the 1945 year were incorporated into Czechoslovakia). In subsequent years, he joined the Polish Cultural and Educational Union and founded the local division in Nebory. Karol Pawlica died on 17 September 1970 in Nebory at the age of 86 and was buried at the cemetery in Nebory.

== Bibliography ==
- Tadeusz Kopoczek, Samuraj z... Nieborów, „Kalendarz Cieszyński”, T. 21 (2005 [2004]), pp. 177–184.
