= Christian Theological Academy, Warsaw =

Christian Theological Academy in Warsaw
- Chrześcijańska Akademia Teologiczna w Warszawie
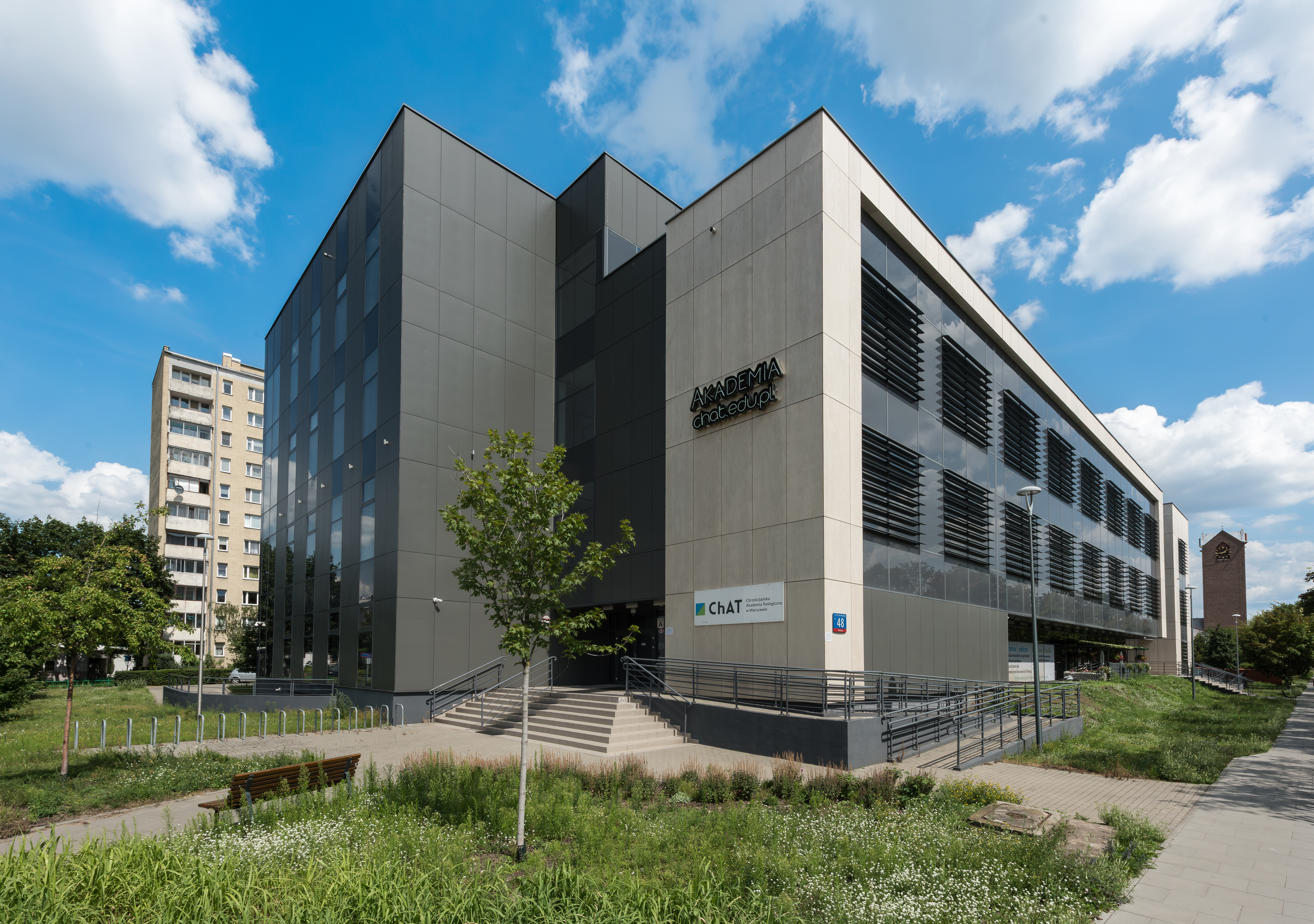
- Type: Public, non-profit
- Established: 1954
- Location: Warsaw, Poland; 52.2695°N 20.9548°E
- Nickname: ChAT

The Christian Theological Academy in Warsaw (ChAT) (Polish: Chrześcijańska Akademia Teologiczna w Warszawie) is a non-profit public university in Warsaw. It was established in 1954.

Karol Wolfram was a former professor, and pro-rector of the university.
