= Karol d'Abancourt de Franqueville (soldier) =

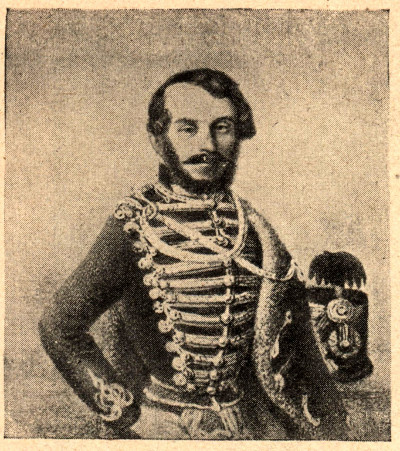
Karol d'Abancourt de Franqueville

Karol d'Abancourt de Franqueville (1811 – 16 October 1849) was a Polish soldier, who led dissenting Poles and Hungarians into battle against Austria in 1848.

His family consisted of French immigrants to Poland. Augustyn, his father, was the brother of the war minister of King Louis XVI, Charles Xavier Abancourt. Karol's younger brother, Franciszek Ksawery (1815–1892) became a publicist.

He was educated in Sambir and Przemyśl, where he decided to join the Austrian army. As a cadet he was assigned to the 30th Infantry of the Earl of Nugent. In 1837, he became involved in an attempted military coup, and was subsequently imprisoned and sentenced to death. The sentence was commuted to 20 years imprisonment in 1838. He was granted amnesty in 1848 and released.

After his discharge from the Austrian army, he joined the ranks of the insurgent Hungarian armies. He commanded 12 regiments of hussars in southern Hungary, where it is said that his bravery greatly inspired his soldiers. He fought in battle until the battle of Szolnok, where he was wounded and lost his voice.

He then went on to serve as adjutant General to Henryk Dembiński, marshall of the Southern army. Captured by the Austrians in battle, he was tried for his activities supporting the agitating Poles and Hungarians, as well as for his actions against Austrian troops in combat. He was convicted and sentenced to death along with fellow defendants Peter Giron and Prince Mieczysław of Woroniec. He was executed on 16 October 1849.
