= Kalu =

Kalu or Kaloo may refer to:

== Places ==
=== Iran ===
- Kalu, Bostanabad, a village in Bostanabad County, East Azerbaijan Province
- Kalu, Varzaqan, a village in Varzaqan County, East Azerbaijan Province
- Kalu, alternate name of Gol Chul, a village in Varzaqan County, East Azerbaijan Province
- Kalu, Gorgan, a village in Gorgan County, Golestan Province
- Kalu, Ramian, a village in Ramian County, Golestan Province
- Kalu, Hormozgan, a village in Hormozgan Province
- Kalu, Dargaz, a village in Dargaz County, Razavi Khorasan Province
- Kalu, Kalat, a village in Kalat County, Razavi Khorasan Province
- Kalu, Takht-e Suleyman Massif, a summit in Takht-e Suleyman Massif

=== Elsewhere ===
- Kalu, Afghanistan
- Kalu, Rajasthan, a village in Lunkaransar Tehsil, Bikaner district, India
- Kalu river, a river in Sri Lanka
- Kalu (woreda), a district in Ethiopia

== Other uses ==
- Kalu (name)
- KALU, an American radio station

== See also ==
- Kalow (disambiguation)
- Kolu (disambiguation)
