= Kolu =

Kolu or KOLU may refer to:

== Places ==
- Kolu, Harju County, village in Kose Parish, Harju County, Estonia
  - Kolu Inn, an inn originally located in that village and currently exhibited as a part of the Estonian Open Air Museum.
- Kolu, Lääne County, village in Haapsalu, Lääne County, Estonia
- Kolu, Lääne-Viru County, village in Kadrina Parish, Lääne-Viru County, Estonia
- Kolu, Järva County, village in Türi Parish, Järva County, Estonia
- Kolu, Hormozgan, a village in Hormozgan Province, Iran
- Kolu-ye Olya, a village in Ardabil Province, Iran
- Kolu-ye Sofla, a village in Ardabil Province, Iran

== Other uses ==
- KOLU, an American radio station
- Columbus Municipal Airport (Nebraska) (ICAO code: KOLU), an airport in the US
- an alternate spelling of Golu, a toy festival in South India

== See also ==
- Kalow (disambiguation)
- Kalu (disambiguation)
