= Kalow =

Kalow may refer to:

- Kalow, Afghanistan
- Kalow, East Azerbaijan (كالو), Iran
- Kalow, Dargaz (كالو), Razavi Khorasan Province, Iran
- Kalow, Kalat (كالو), Razavi Khorasan Province, Iran
- Kałów, Poland

== See also ==
- Kalow (disambiguation)
- Kalu (disambiguation)
- Kolu (disambiguation)
- Karlow (name)
