= Kalu (name) =

Kalu (also Kanu) is a common Igbo surname. It is a contraction of Kamalu (also Kamanu), which is the name for Amadioha, the god of lightning and justice, in the Arochukwu, Bende, and Ohafia regions.

== Given name ==
- Kalu Rinpoche (1905–1989), Tibetan Buddhist

== Notable people with this surname ==
- Ikechukwu Kalu, Nigerian footballer
- Kalu Idika Kalu, Nigerian politician and former minister of finance
- Joshua Kalu, Nigerian-American football player
- Maxwell Kalu, Nigerian footballer
- Nnena Kalu, British-Nigerian artist
- Orji Uzor Kalu, Nigerian politician
- Samuel Kalu, Nigerian footballer
- Nnamdi Kanu, British political activist and leader of the Indigenous People of Biafra

== See also ==
- Kalu (disambiguation)
- Kallu (name)
