= Kolu, Harju County =

Village in Estonia

Coordinates: 59.18881°N 25.04654°E

Kolu (Kose)
- Village
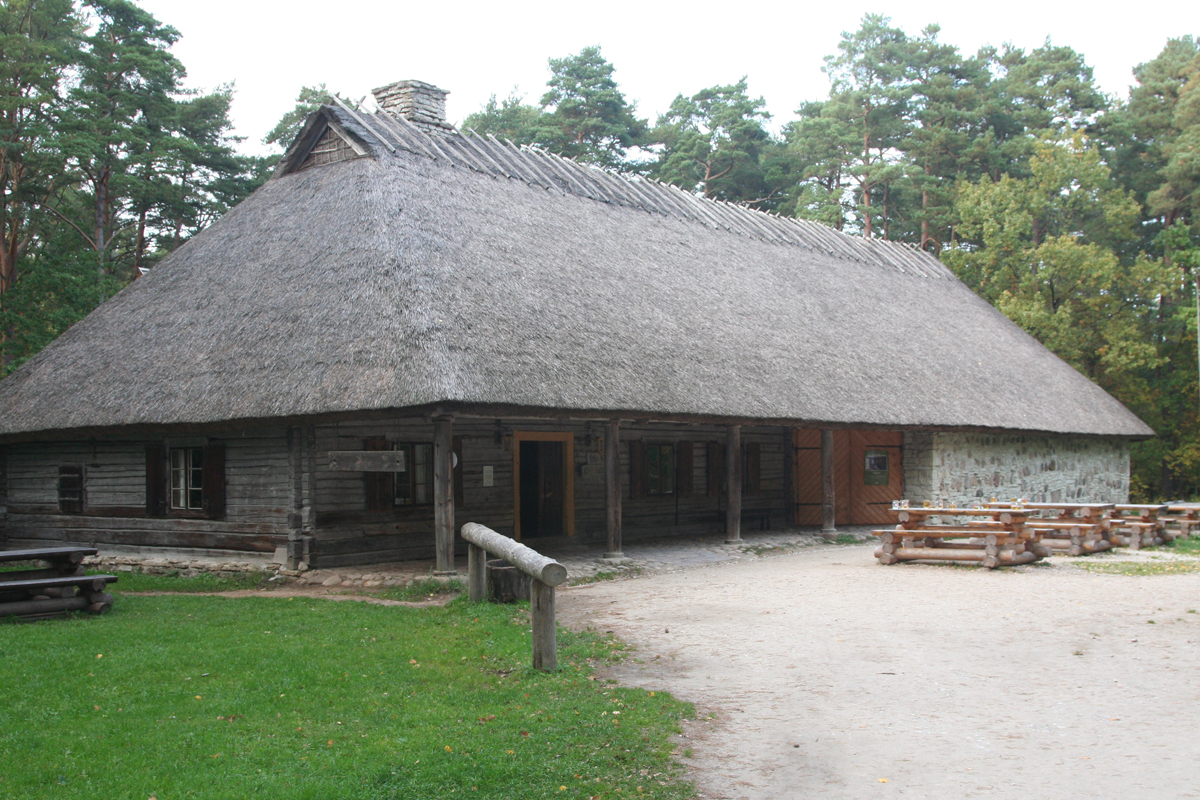
- The Kolu Inn in its new location at the Estonian Open Air Museum, Tallinn
- Interactive map of Kolu (Kose)
- Country: Estonia
- County: Harju County
- Parish: Kose Parish
- Time zone: UTC+2 (EET)
  - Summer (DST): UTC+3 (EEST)

Kolu is a village in Kose Parish, Harju County in northern Estonia. Located near a centuries-old trade route, it is the original location of the Kolu Inn, originally built around 1840 and currently at the Estonian Open Air Museum.

== Ancient sacral sites ==
The village is a site of protected ancient cult stones.
