= Estonian Open Air Museum =

Museum in Estonia

- Eesti Vabaõhumuuseum
- Established: 1957; Opened to visitors in 1964
- Location: Rocca al Mare, shore of Kopli Bay, Tallinn, Estonia
- Coordinates: 59°25′53″N 24°38′17″E
- Type: Open-air museum
- Director: Tanel Veeremaa
- Public transit access: Rocca al mare bus stop (21, 21B, 41, 41B)
- Parking: Free parking for museum visitors
- Website: www.evm.ee

The Estonian Open Air Museum (Estonian: Eesti Vabaõhumuuseum) is a life-sized reconstruction of an 18th-19th century rural/fishing village, which includes church, tavern, schoolhouse, several mills, a fire station, twelve farmyards and net sheds. Furthermore, it includes a recently opened 20th century Soviet kolkhoz apartment building, and a prefabricated modern wooden house from 2019. The site spans 72 hectares (180 acres) of land and along with the farmyards, old public buildings are arranged singularly and in groups in a way that represents an overview of Estonian vernacular architecture of the past two centuries from across Estonia.

The museum is located 8 km (5.0 mi) to the west of Tallinn city center at Rocca al Mare.

The plans for founding the museum were first discussed in 1913, when Estonian literati, inspired by Scandinavian open-air museums, wanted to establish such a museum in Estonia. It was finally established in 1957 and opened to visitors in 1964.

The museum's oldest exhibit is the Sutlepa Chapel of the Noarootsi Swedish church, which has been reported since 1670. The most modern exhibit is a prefabricated wooden house from 2019 constructed at the museum; and the most recent exhibit that has opened to visitors in 2021 is the Kolhoz apartment building from the 1960s, brought from Southern Estonia from a former collective farm.

== History ==
The Estonian National Museum, established in 1909 in Tartu, took on the creation of an open-air museum as its own task in 1913. Estonian intellectuals got the idea from visiting the open air museums in Scandinavia and Finland (in Sweden the open air museum Skansen was established in 1891, in Norway in 1897, in Denmark in 1901, in Finland Seurasaari open air museum was established in 1909). The First World War hindered the museum from taking more serious steps. As from 1921, the resources of Estonian National Museum were spent on fitting out the Raadi Castle, and increasing economic difficulties did not enable to begin with the costly undertaking – the construction of the open air museum.

In years 1925 – 1931, the Estonian Open Air Museum Association was active in Tallinn, and setting up the museum in the capital was under discussion. In 1920s and 1930s, the ethnographers of the Estonian National Museum I. Manninen, F. Linnus and G. Ränk promoted and planned the future exposition of the Open Air Museum. The Pirita park-museum should have started its work on 1 July 1941 but the war began.

In 1950, the Union of Architects with K. Tihane, A. Kasper, H. Armani, G. Jommi and others raised the issue of setting up an open air museum. More specific preparation activities started in 1956, this time in the Ministry of Culture. Additionally, to the above-mentioned names, architects F. Tomps and I. Sagur, and historians H. Moora, G. Troska, A. Viires and O. Korzjukov were also active in the organizing committees.

The museum was founded on 22 May 1957, it started its activity the same year on 1 June. In July, the museum got a plot of 66 ha near Tallinn, on the coast of Kopli Bay, in the area of Rocca al Mare summer manor, which was established in 19th century. The museum under construction was opened for the visitors in August 1964.

In 1974, the Open Air Museum was offered the I category. In 1975, it was visited by more than 100,000 people.

On April 10, 1984, the Sassi-Jaani exhibit barn-dwelling and storehouse were set on fire. There had been arsons in the Open Air Museum earlier, too, in 1963, 1967, 1968 and 1978, but the Sassi-Jaani exhibit buildings were of special value because of its age and interesting building construction, as there were no equivalent original buildings, a decision was made by the museum's scientific council and public commissions that a copy would be built.

In the 1980s the cultural and educational activities became more lively and new working methods were developed. Following the long-time experience of the Latvian Open Air Museum, the first handicraft fair of the Estonian open Air Museum took place in 1988.

In the 1990s the research work was continued with the field of topics connected with improving the exposition, the study of present exhibit buildings and the history of their former owners became a new trend.

Owing to the breakup of the Soviet Union and the political tensions, the visibility of the museum dropped considerably and new working methods were searched for - more extensive daily handicraft sale in the museum, handicraft demonstrations, temporary exhibitions in exhibit buildings, celebrating notable days of the national calendar as well as topical work with children started to be introduced.

On 1 January 2014, the state museum The Estonian Open Air Museum and state institution Conservation Center Kanut joined and formed a foundation Estonian Open Air Museum Foundation. The foundation works as a museum that introduces rural architecture and landscape as well as a center that deals with restoration, conservation and digitization.

Directors of the Estonian Open Air Museum
1957–1971	Olimpi Korzjukov
1972–1982	Leon-Hannes Paiken
1983–1987	Oskar Vasar
1987–1992	Tõnis Müller
1993–2018	Merike Lang
2019–	Tanel Veeremaa

== Exhibition ==
=== Western Estonia ===
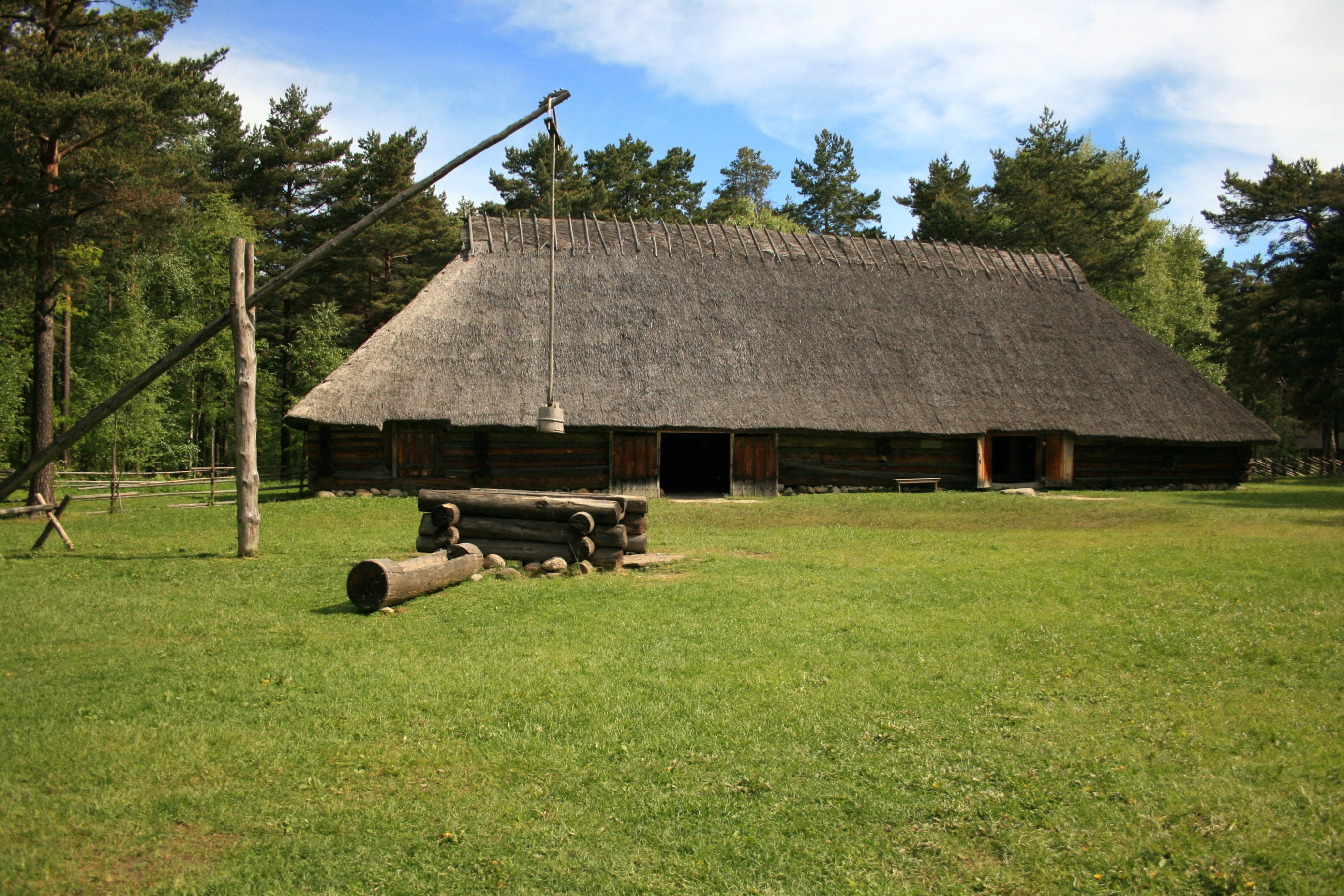
Sassi-Jaani farm

Sassi-Jaani farm

The farm is from Kullamaa parish in the early 19th century. The buildings were brought to the museum in 1959-1960 and opened to visitors in 1964. The threshing house and storehouse burned in 1984. The restored farm was re-opened at the museum in 1993.

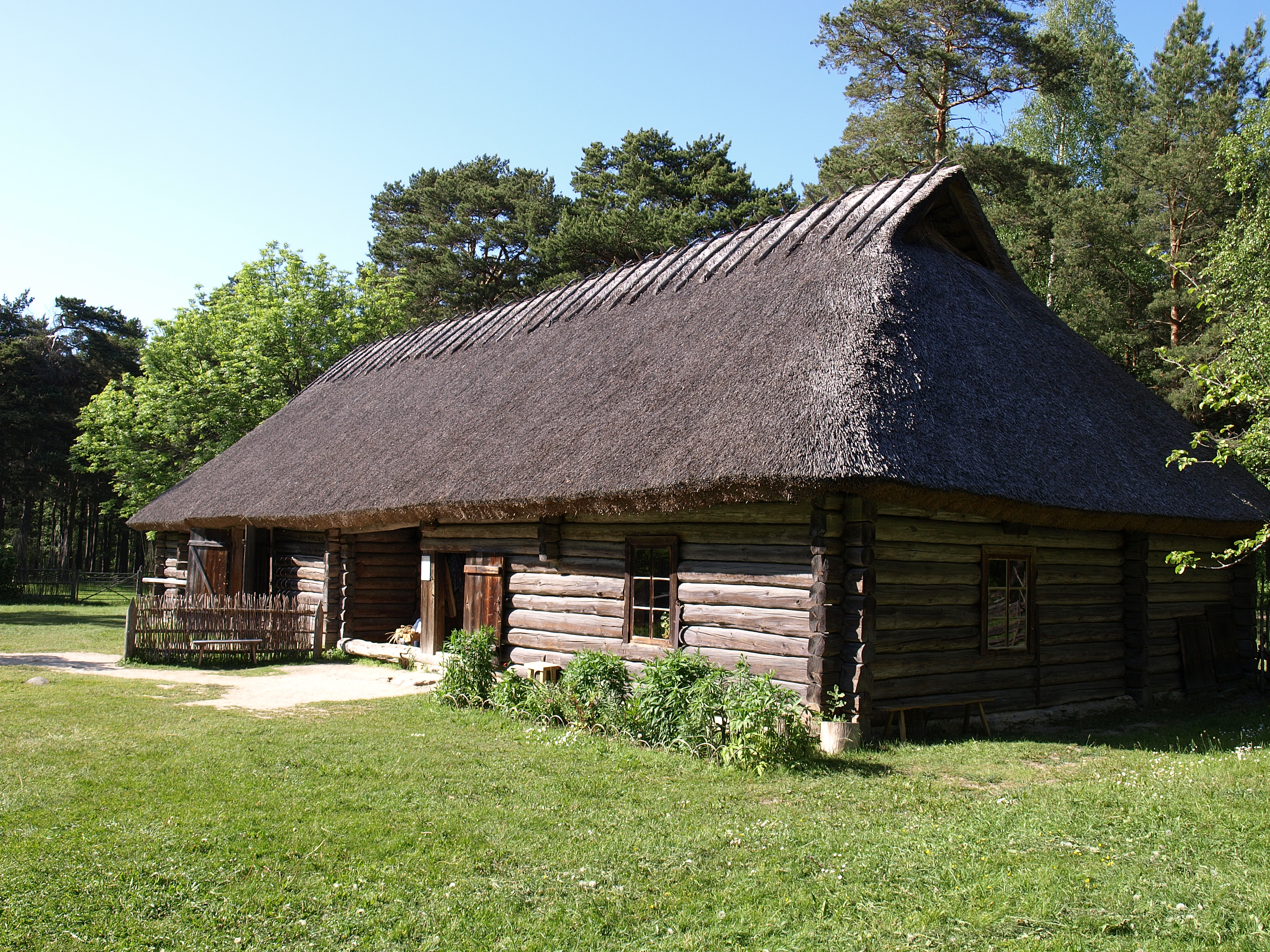
Köstriaseme farm

Köstriaseme farm

Köstriaseme farm is from Kirikla village in Hageri parish. The buildings were brought to the museum from 1959 to 1962, and the farmyard was opened to visitors in 1962.The average sized farm, that paid rent to Hageri church manor, had about 30 hectares of land and about 9 hectares of cropland.

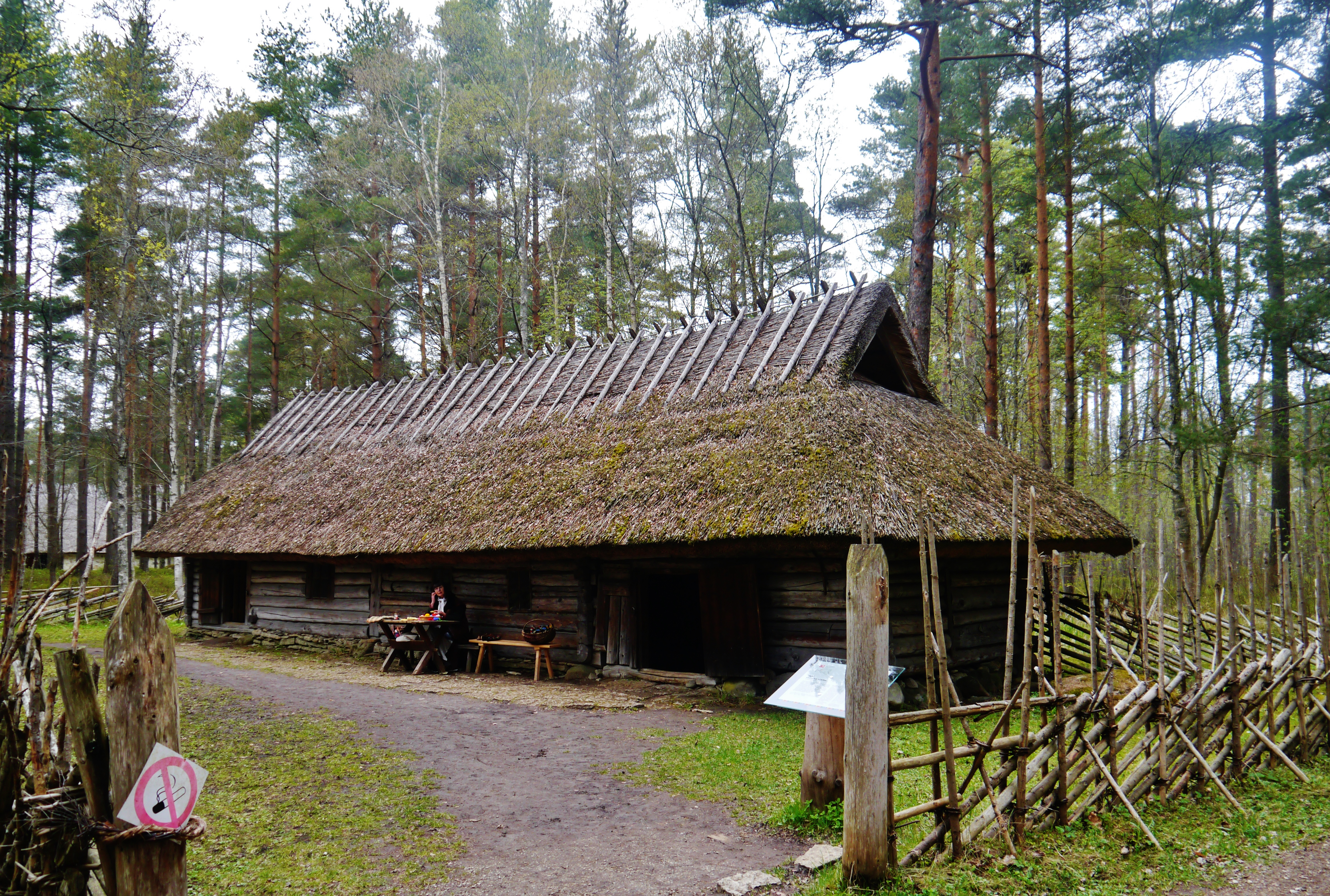
Nuki farm

Nuki farm

Nuki smokehouse is an example of the yard of a poorer inhabitant of western Estonia on the periphery of the farm. Built from 1880 to 1890 at the former site of the Nuki cotter in Saunja village in Lääne-Nigula parish. Brought to the museum in 1970, erected from 1970 to 1971.

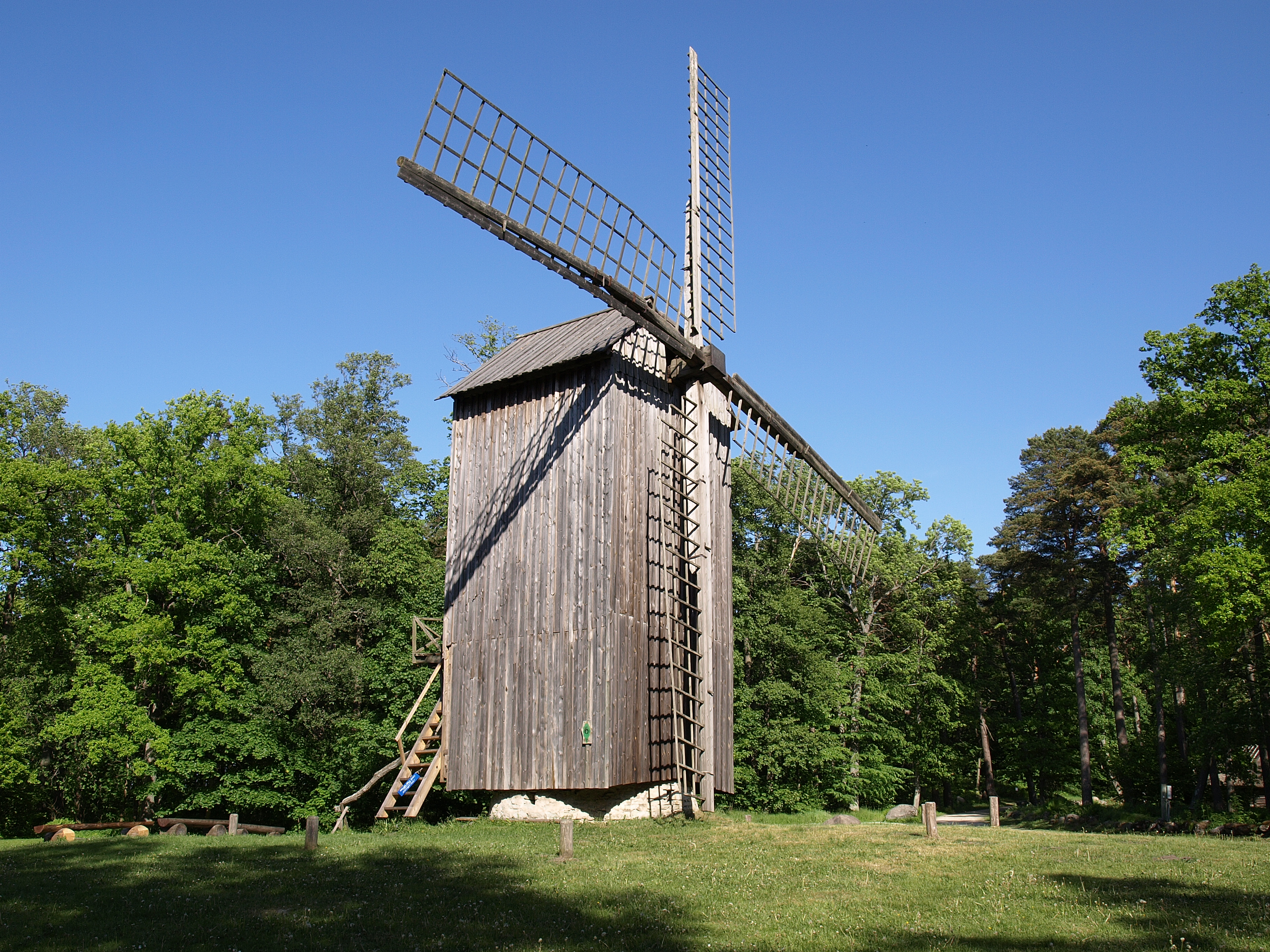
Nätsi windmill

Nätsi windmill

Big post windmill that comes from Vanasauna farm in Nätsi village, Mihkli parish, the southern part of Läänemaa County in Western Estonia. Allegedly, it was built in the second half of the 19th century on Pärdi-Madise farm in Rabavere village and was then sold to Nätsi village in Mihkli parish. The windmill was owned by different farms in the course of time, until Ants Kümmel, a cotter from Vanasauna farm, bought it after the First World War. He enlarged the windmill and started to grind flour for villages in the neighbourhood. The windmill was transferred to the museum in 1959 and opened in 1960.

=== Northern Estonia ===
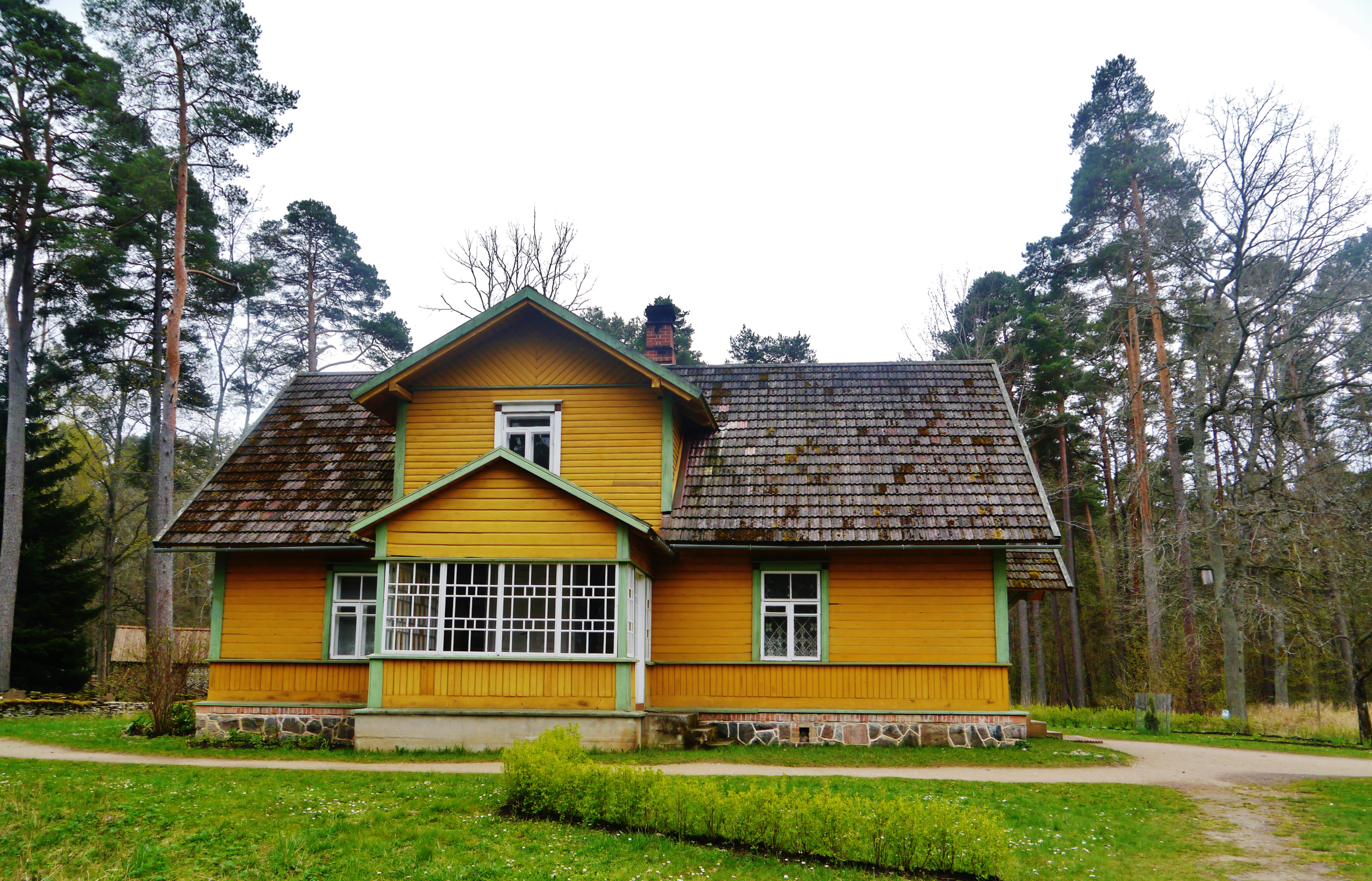
Härjapea farm

Härjapea farm

This average-sized Viru County farm was purchased from the owners of Mäetaguse manor for 4,000 silver roubles in 1892. The farm had 44 ha of land, including 13 ha of fields.

The dwelling constructed during the Empire era was later modernised, and the rooms show people's life at the end of 1930s. The orchard and flower beds are also characteristic of the household culture of the interwar period. The farm homestead features the outbuildings of Kutsari farm dating back to the end of the 19th century and the stone threshing floor of a ruined barn-dwelling, so the composite name of ‘Kutsari- Härjapea’ is also in use. The sauna is located farther away at the pond.

The building was completed by the museum's jubilee in the 50th anniversary.

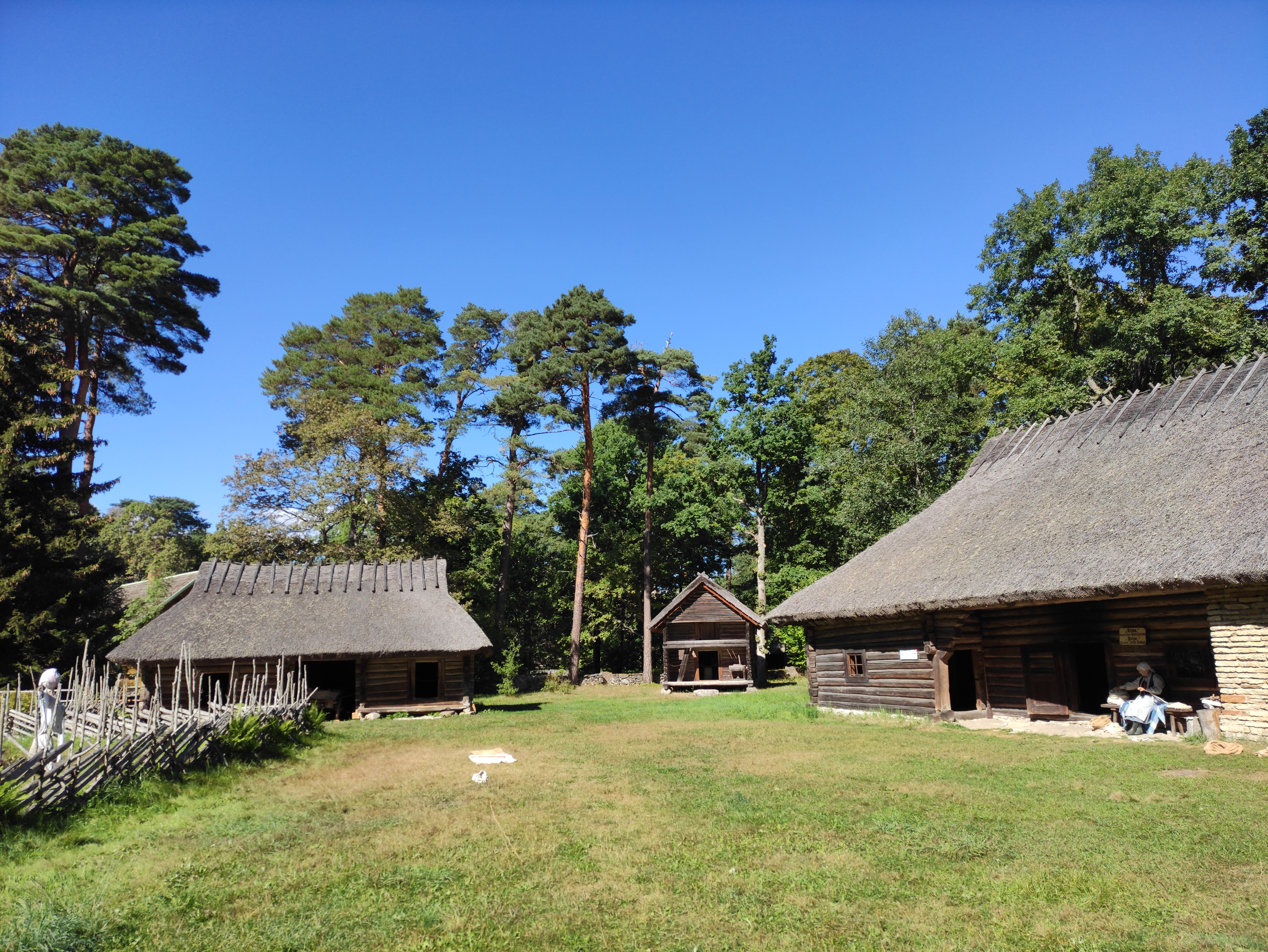
Pulga farm

Pulga farm

Pulga farm represents a rental farm characteristic of Northern Estonia dating back to the middle of the 19th century. Farm buildings were brought from the villages of Kuusalu parish to the museum in 1961–1964, and the farmyard was opened to visitors in 1964.

The fact that soil in Northern Estonia is rich in limestone is displayed by many buildings located in the spacious yard: the threshing floor of the barn-dwelling, the smithy and summer kitchen are all made of limestone and stone hedges where large slabs of stone alternate with stonework.

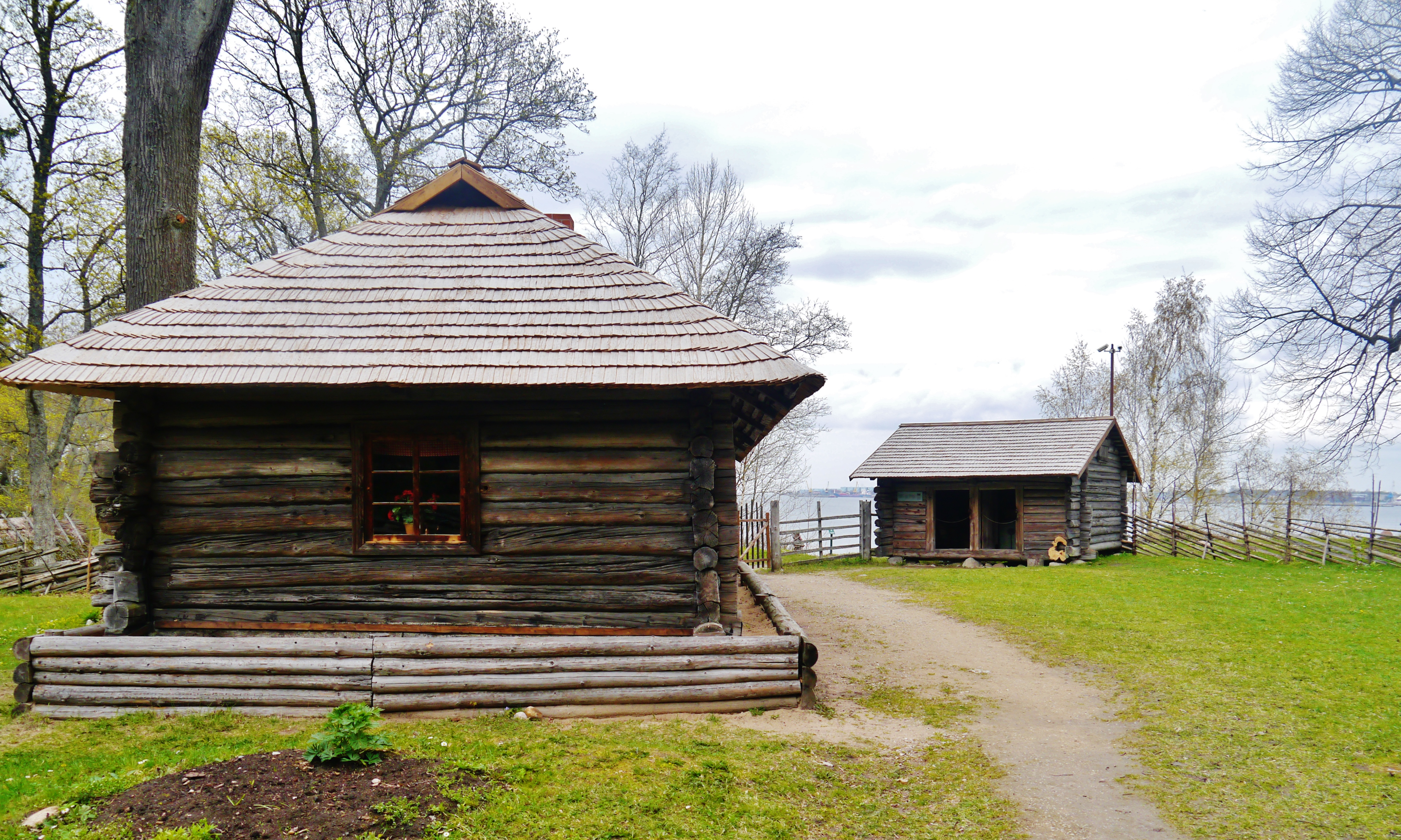
Aarte farm

Aarte farm

Aarte farm is an example of a small farm belonging to a fisherman in the 2nd half of the 19th century. Farm buildings have been brought from Aarte farm in Virve village on Juminda peninsula, Kuusalu parish. The farm was opened for visitors in 1982.

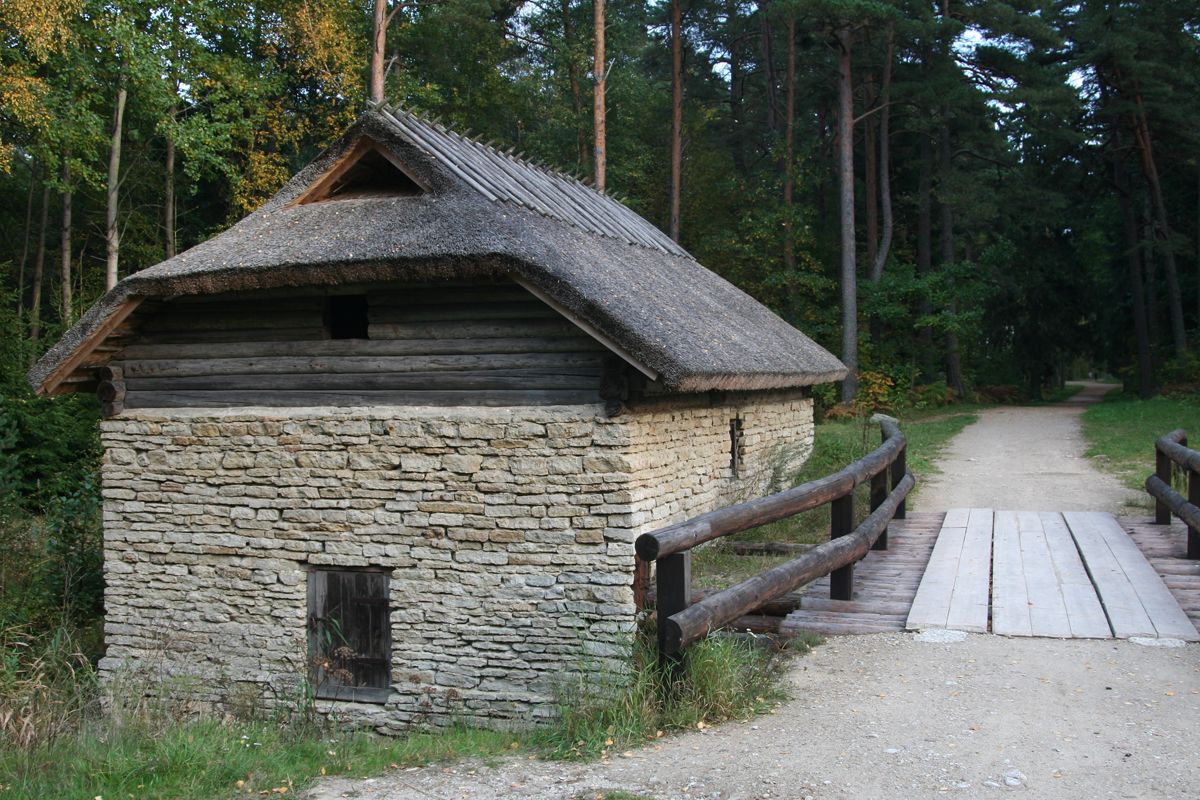
Kahala watermill

Kahala watermill

The small watermill built on Liiva spring on Möldri farm in Kahala village, Kuusalu parish, was used to grind straight flour, wholemeal flour as well as rye coarse meal for making gruel during the spring and autumn floods; it would also make groats. Kahala mill was one of four watermills of Kolga manor. The mill was brought to the museum in 1962 and opened for visitors in 1969.

=== Southern Estonia ===
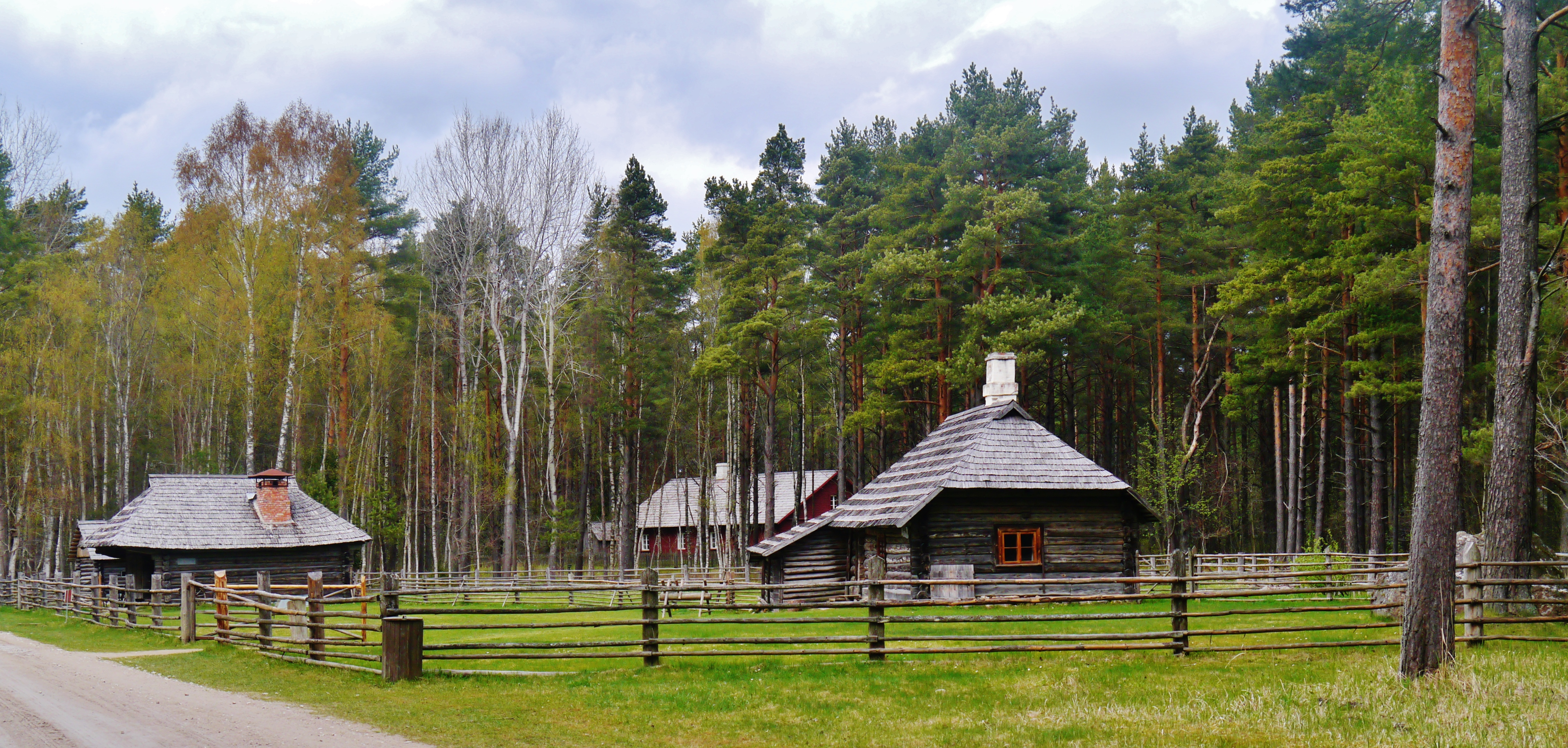
Sepa farm

Sepa farm

Sepa farm from Rõuge parish represents the household of a blacksmith in southern Estonia at the turn of the century. Brought to the museum in 1987–1997 and opened for visitors in 1999. This small farm in Võru County had some 10 ha of poor soil, and smithcraft was the main source of income. Due to the changes in the economy of Estonia in the second half of the 19th century, rural handicraft developed at a fast pace.

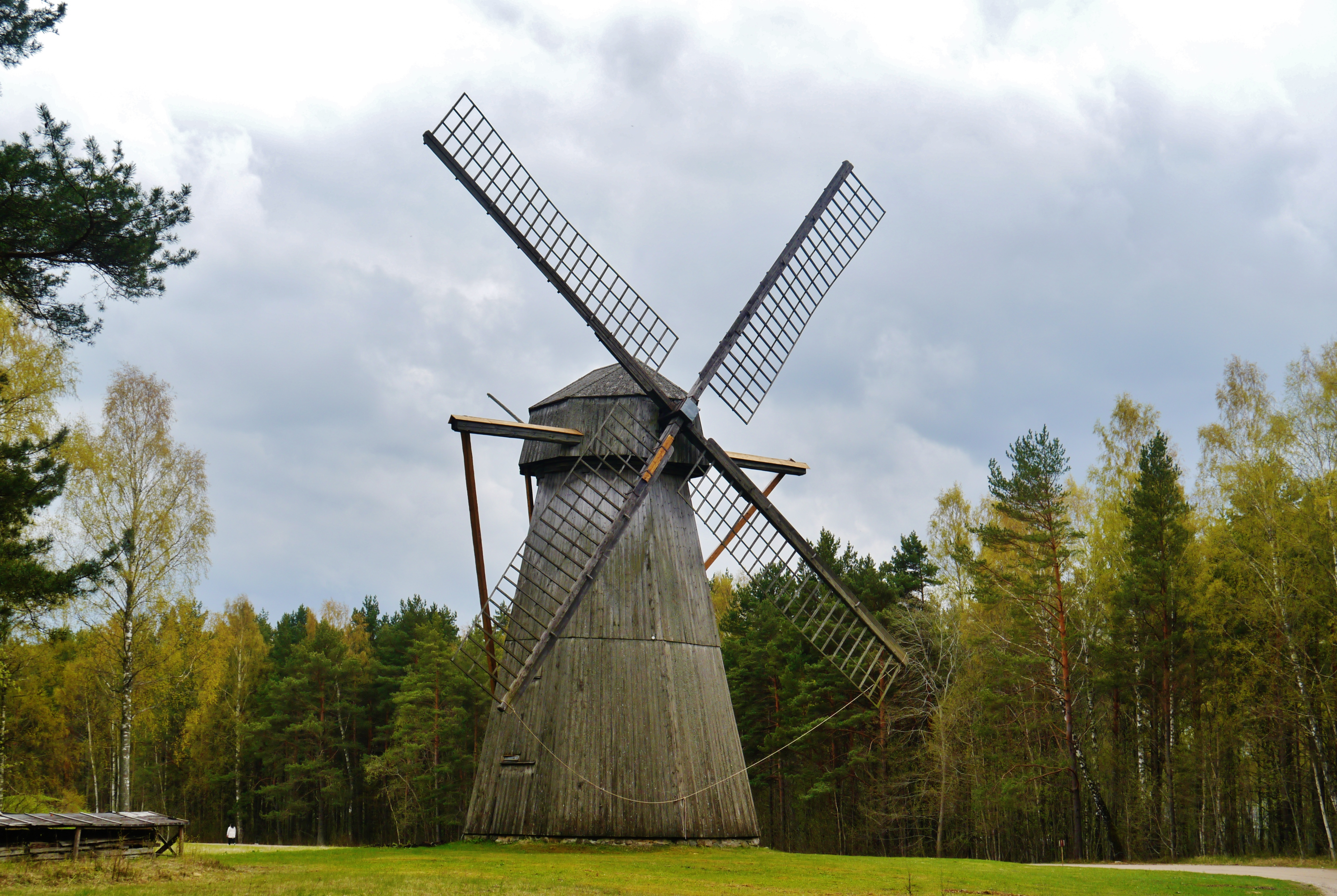
Kalma windmill

Kalma windmill

Kalma windmill, ordered by Juhan Särk, was built by Mustvee mill builder Jakob Sõber in Kalma village, Torma parish. The former earned the money to build the mill by fishing in Lake Peipus. Kalma windmill is the museum exhibit of a Dutch type windmill which can be mainly recognised by the cap-like rotating roof with the sails. It was brought to the museum in 1972, rebuilt from 1991 to 1995.

Ritsu farm

Ritsu farm is an example of a cotter's household in southern Estonia. The barn-dwelling in the yard was built in 1860s on Ritsu farm in Tinnikuru village, Paistu parish. (The storehouse and the cattle-shed have not been built yet). It was brought to the museum in 1966, rebuilt in 1968–1975.

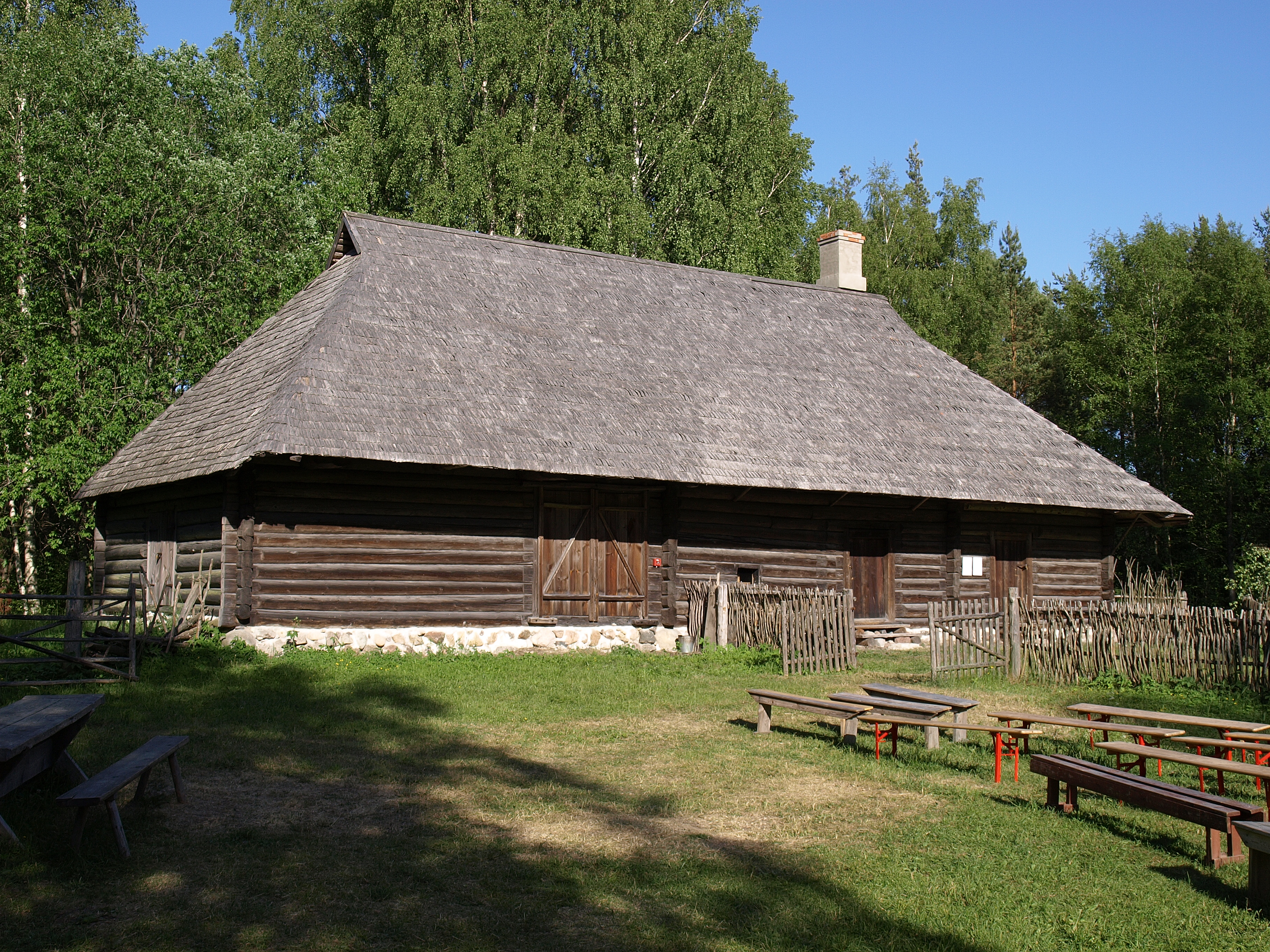
Rusi farm

Rusi farm

Rusi farm from Võru County holds a special place in the museum display. All farmyard buildings except for the new storehouse were brought from Ala-Rusi farm in Pugritsa village, Karula parish, which has a strong connection with the history of Estonian art. Namely, this was the place where the famous sculptor Juhan Raudsepp (1896–1984) who was then known as Juku from Rusi grew up on the farm of his mother's parents. Ala-Rusi was a farm with around 36 hectares of land and two horses, separated from the older large Mäe-Rusi farm for the family's son upon his marriage. Ala-Rusi buildings were brought over in 1967, and the farmyard was opened for visitors in 2002.

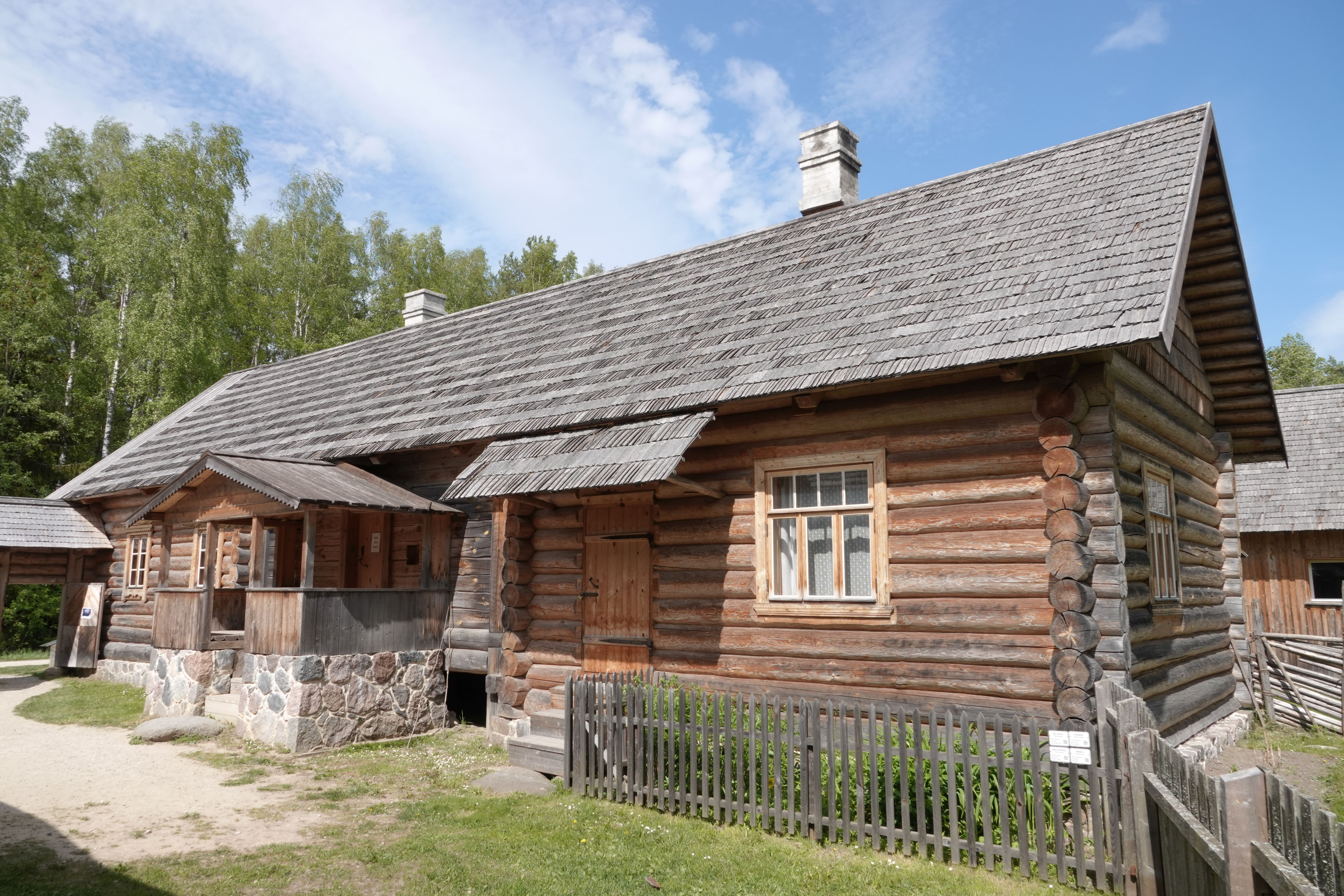
Setu farm

Setu farm

The old farm Vanatalo was situated in Lõkova village (called Ojavere as a part of Estonia) in Pankjavitsa (later Vilo commune), which is now in the Pskov Oblast of Russian Federation.

The eastern part of Setomaa was characterised by farms that were fortified in a way: the dwelling was located in the centre of a so-called three-row yard with rows of outbuildings along two sides of the dwelling. There were narrow yards closed with high gates between it and the outbuildings. The ends of all the buildings faced the village street.

The dwelling and the storehouse were brought to the museum in 1979.

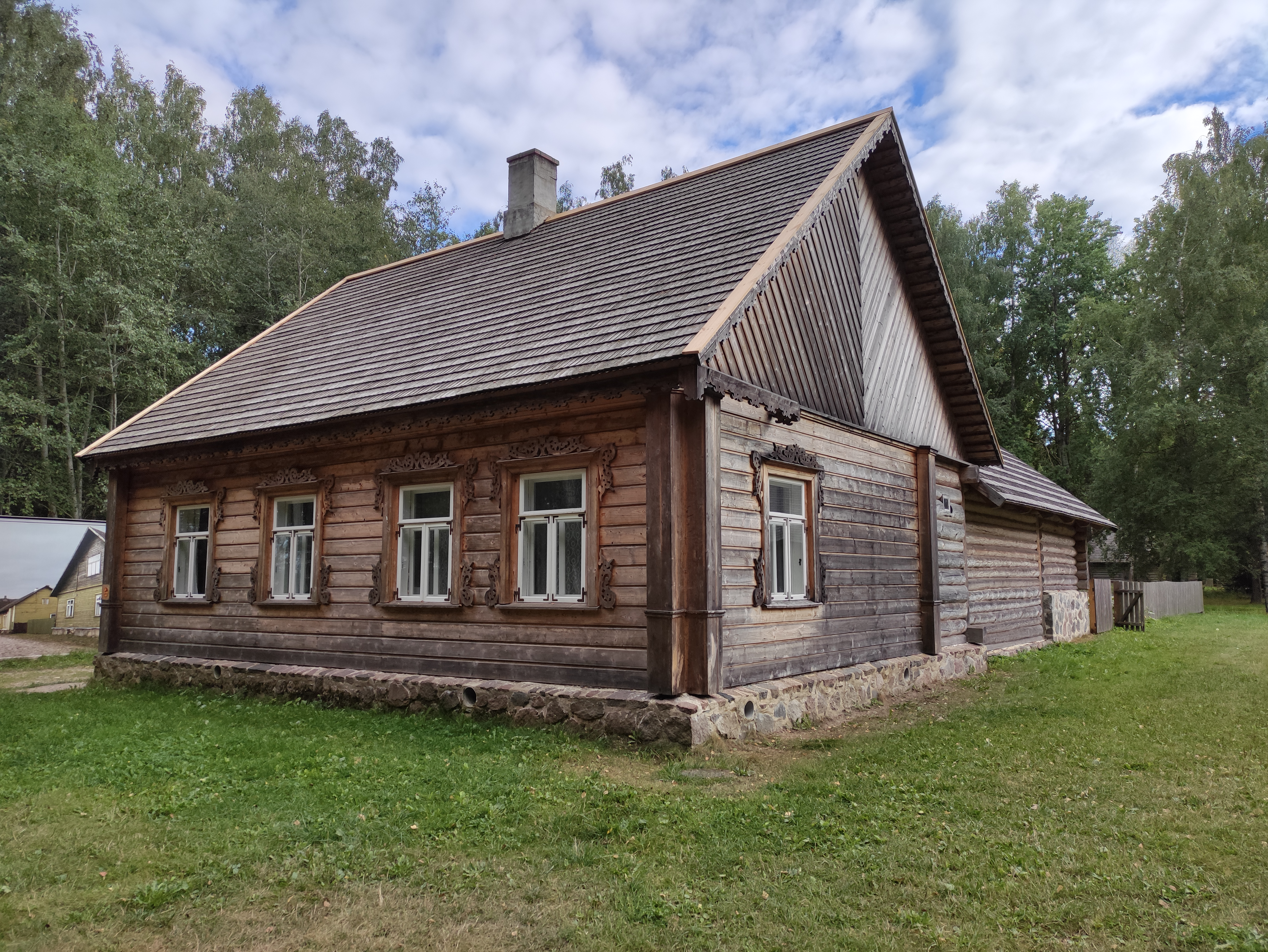
Russian house from Peipus

Russian house from Peipus

The so-called Pechonkin's house (by the owner's surname) built in 1863 was brought from the town of Kallaste, former Kodavere parish.

The peculiar Russian settlement established on the shore of Lake Peipus was founded by Russian Old Believers who fled from Russia after the Orthodox Church dissent in the 18th century. The shore villages where soil was poor mainly lived off fishing, growing vegetables and, later, building work.

The dwelling was relocated in 1991.

=== Islands ===
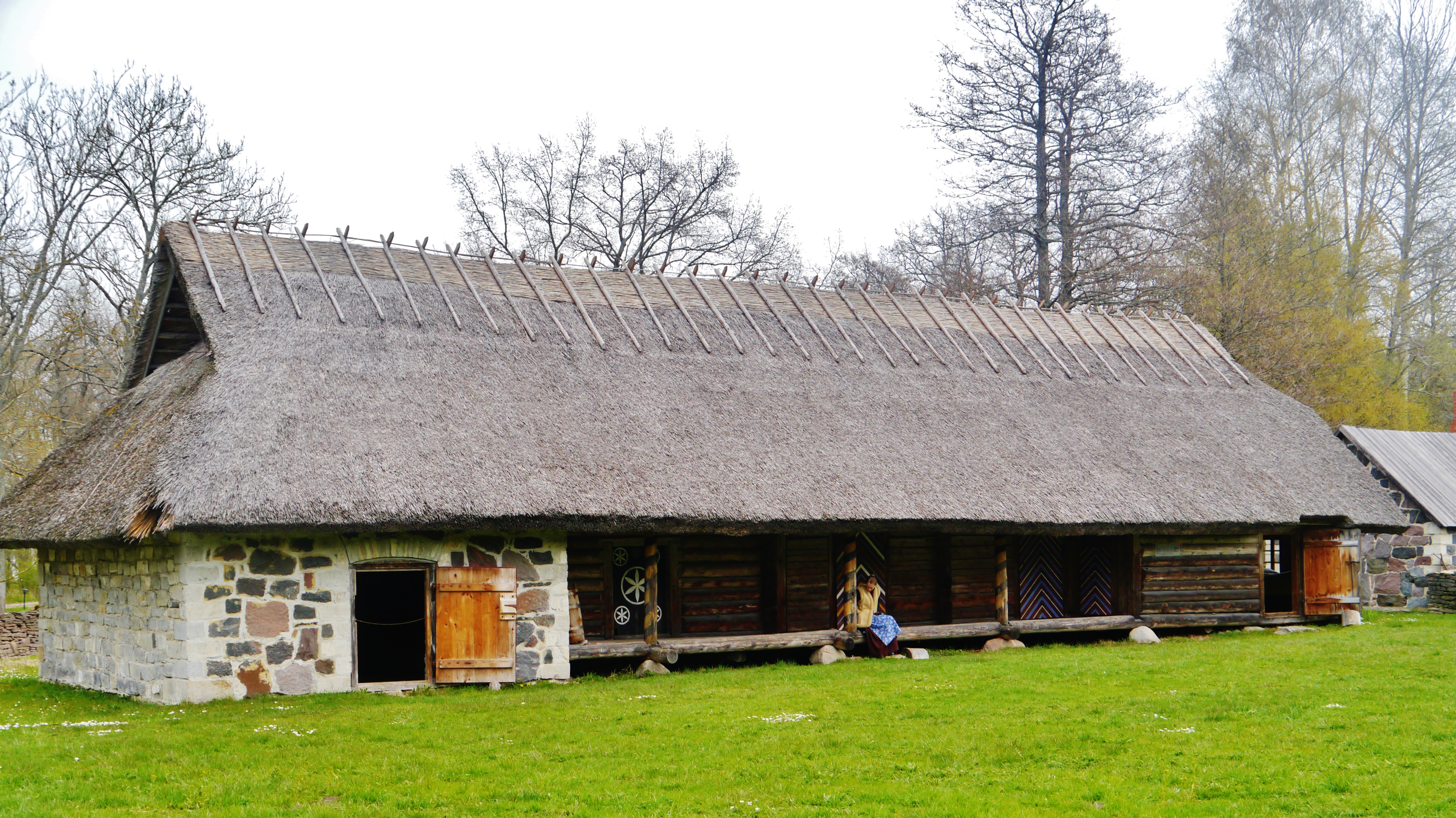
Jüri-Jaagu farm

Jaagu farm

Jaagu farm was a homestead that was apportioned from a larger state manor to a soldier who had retired from the tsarists army. It had 9 hectares of land, of which 2 hectares was fields. The farm was opened at the museum in 1976.

Jüri-Jaagu farm

Jüri-Jaagu farm is an example of a 20th-century tenant farm on Muhu Island. The buildings were brought to the museum from 1973 to 1985, and the farm was opened to visitors in 1996. Muhu farm had 34 hectares of land, of which 6 hectares were fields. As the stony soil and pastureland produced little income, the members of the large family earned money to pay the rent and other expenses from seasonal work.

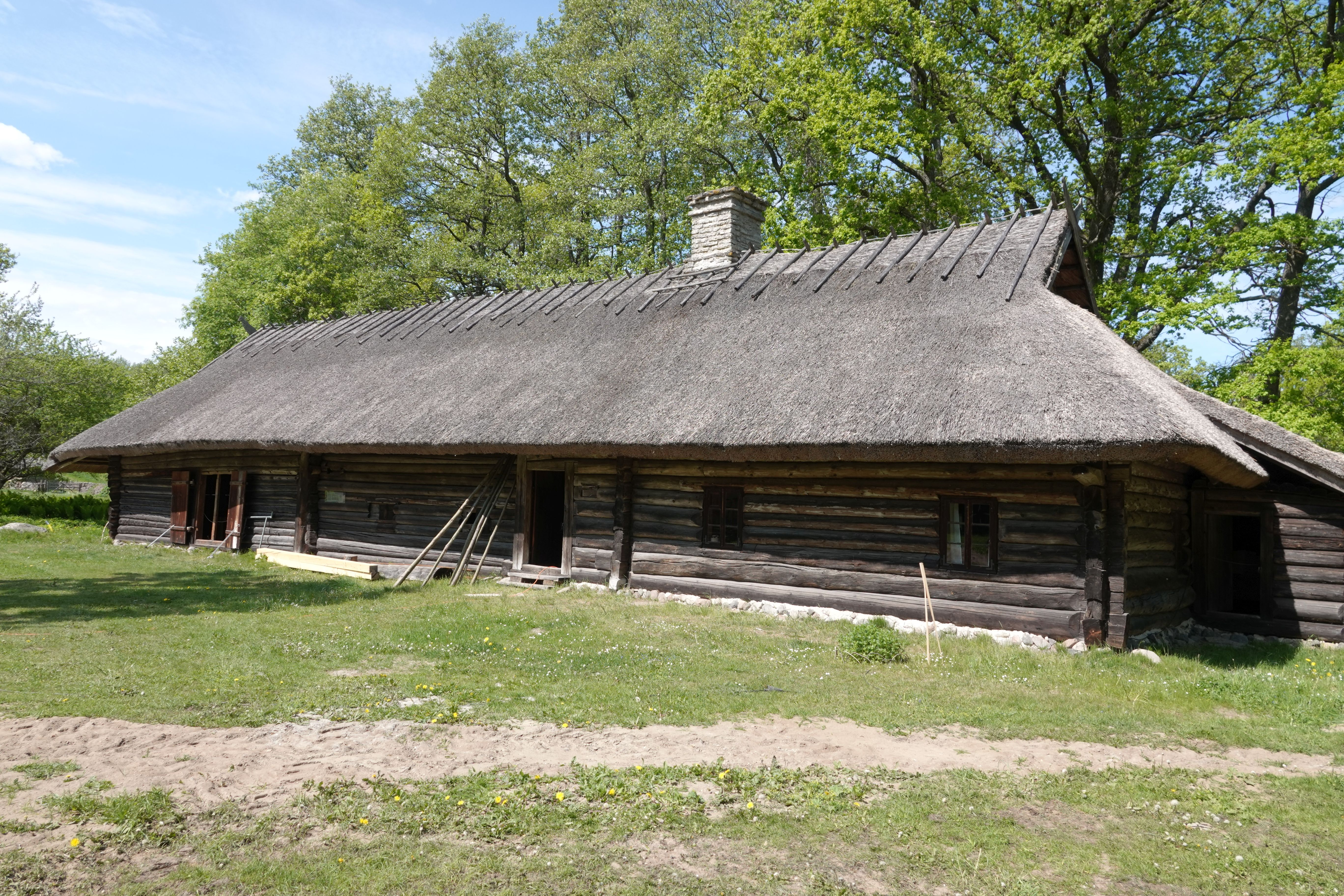
Kolga farm

Kolga farm

Kolga farm is an example of a Hiiumaa tenant farm and how it developed over time. The buildings are from Emmaste parish. The farm was opened to visitors in 1984. The role model for the typically spacious farmyard seen on Hiiumaa was Pendi farm in Lelu village, which still had the old fencing that partitioned the yard. Most Hiiumaa islanders lived less than 8 km (5.0 mi) from the coast, and thus they were seafarers and fishermen as well as farmers.

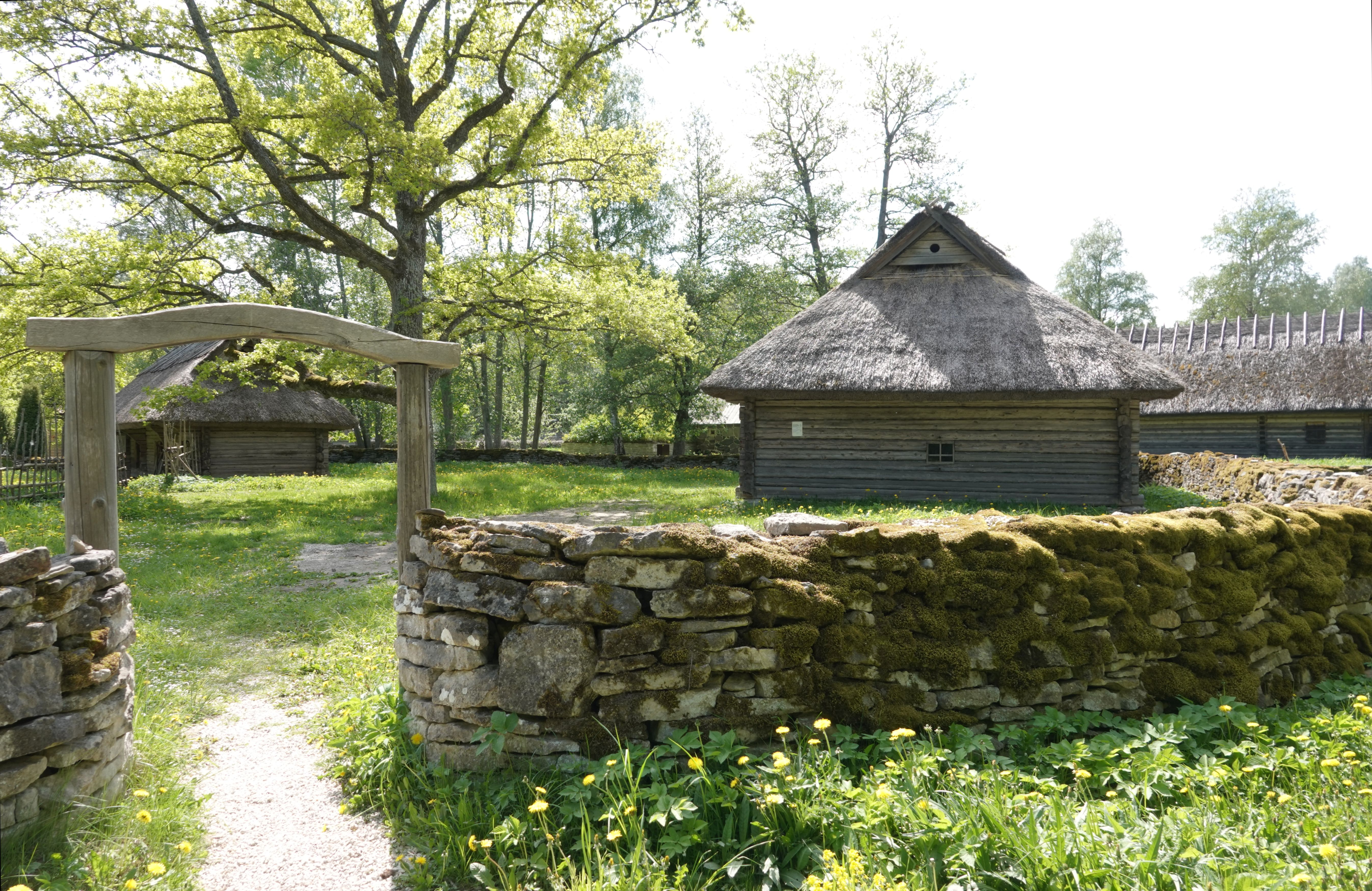
Roosta farm

Roosta farm

Roosta is an example of a western Saaremaa farm in a natural barter economy system dating from the serfdom era. It was brought to the museum from Kihelkonna and Mustjala parishes from 1965 to 1971, and opened to the public in 1972.

An average farm had around 45 hectares (110 acres) of land, of which about 5 hectares was stony fields. The estate owner had control of the farm family itself as well as the land and buildings and fishing rights in coastal waters.

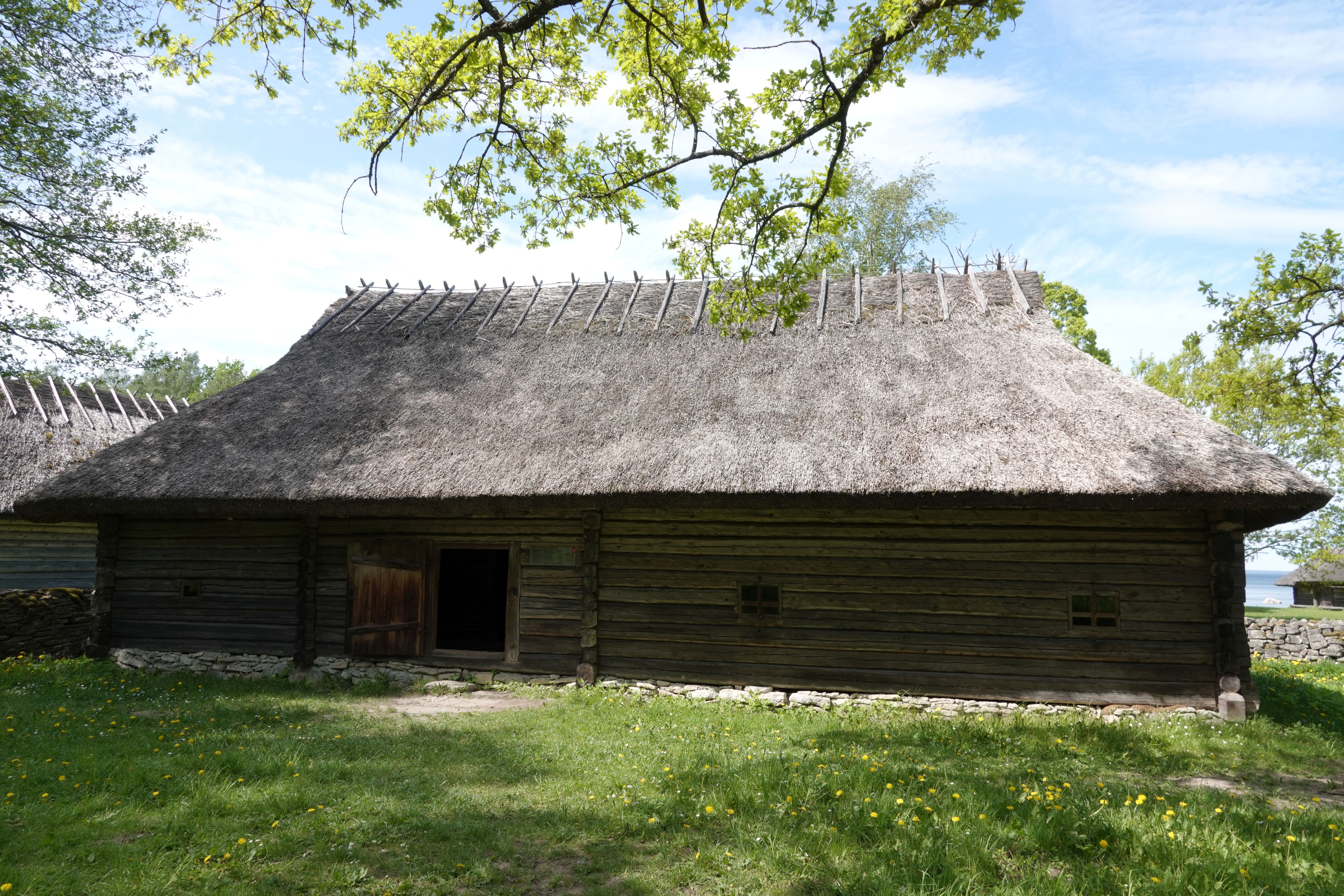
Moravian Church prayer house

Moravian church prayer house

The Moravian Church prayer house was built in 1780 on Paka farm in Tuiu village, Mustjala parish. Brought to the museum in 1965. Such Moravian Church prayer houses started to be built around 1730, when the movement gained many followers.

A simple building with Spartan furnishings and featuring a ‘black kitchen’ – uncommon in Estonia – reflects the tenets of the religious movement – humility, piety and belief in redemption through Christ's sacrifice and belief in the resurrection.

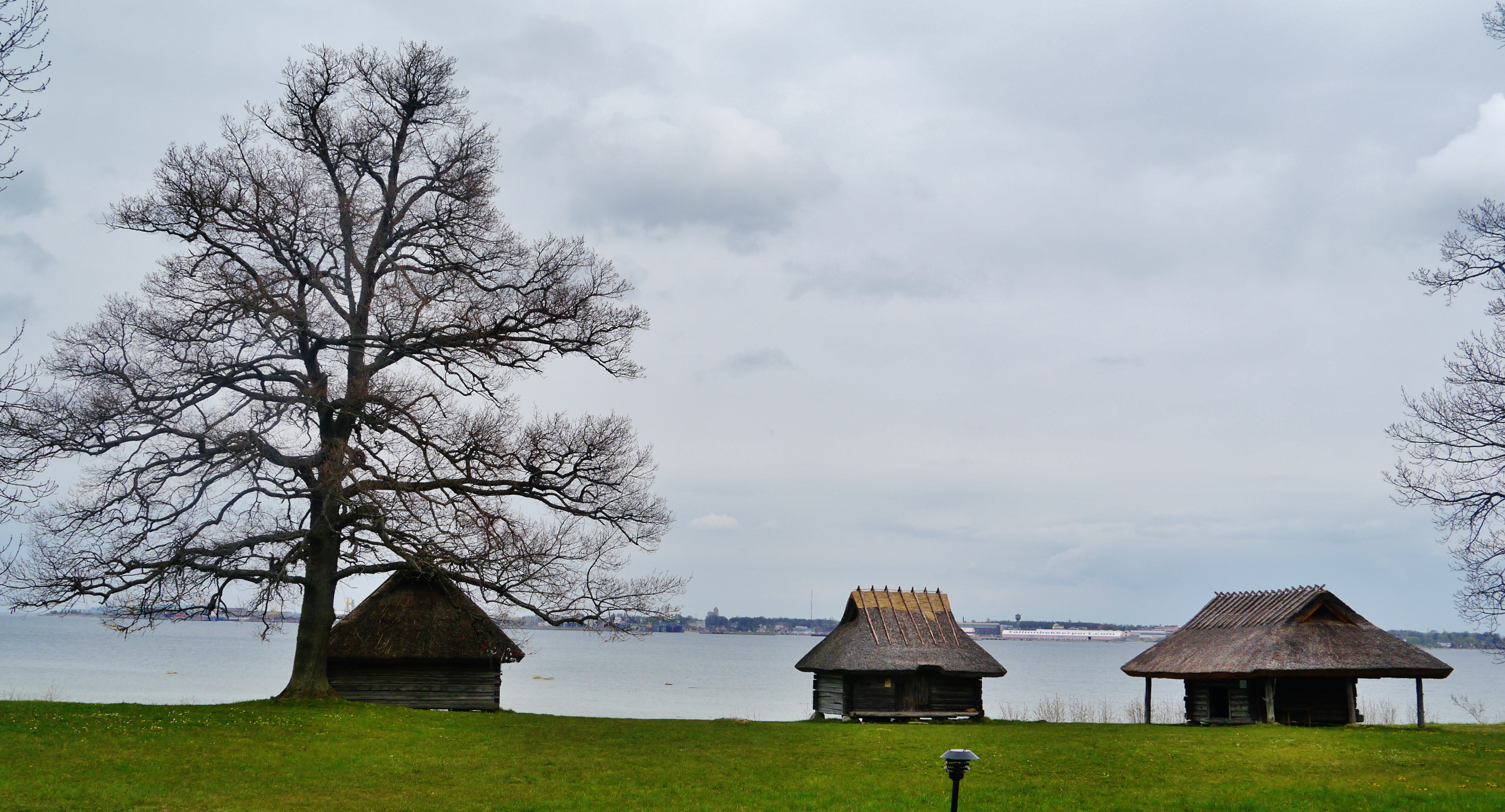
Net sheds

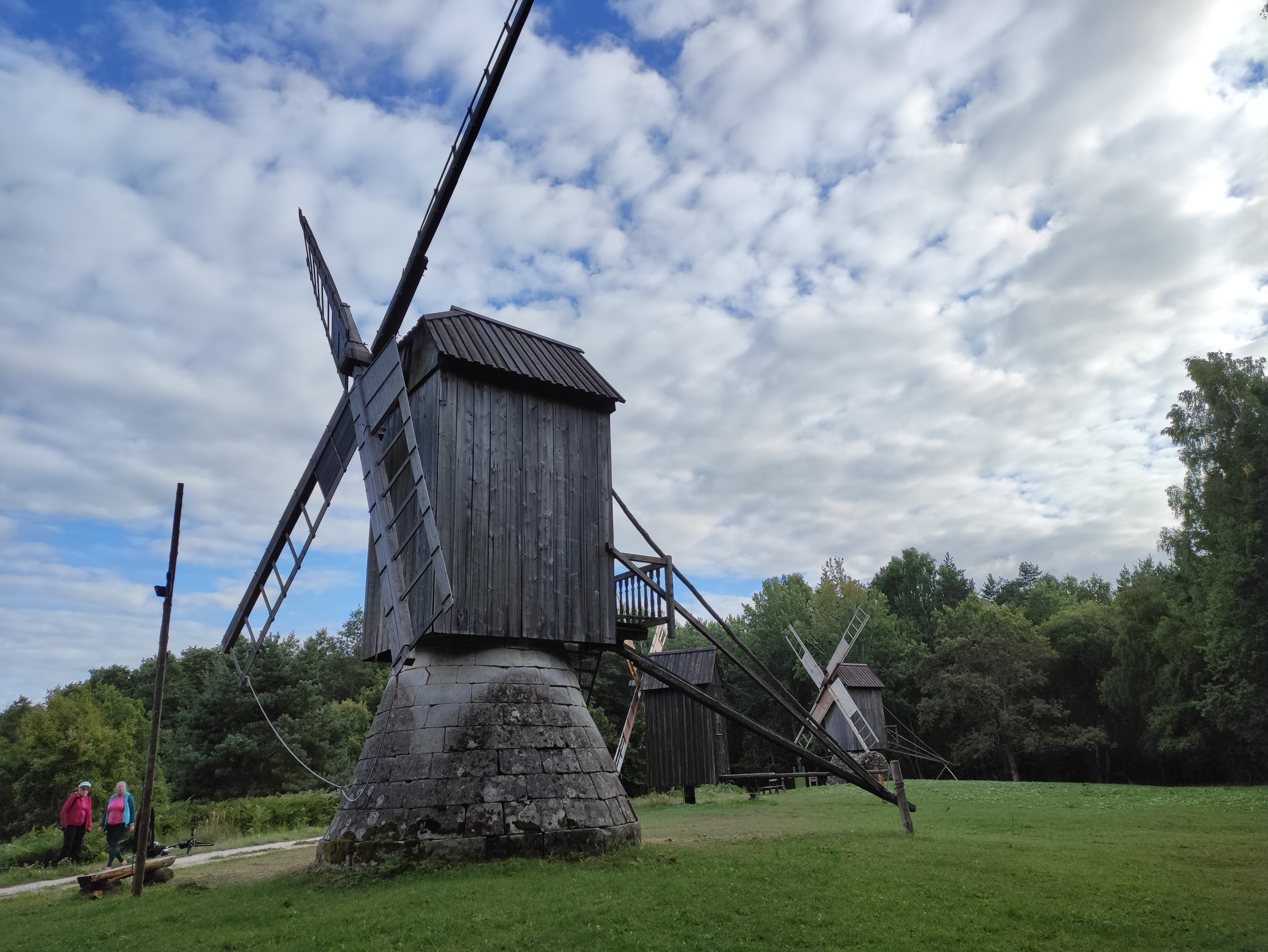
Ledri windmill

Hiiuma itinerant fishing house

This temporary residence was built in the late 19th century by Audru manor in Sarvi village in Audru parish for fishermen arriving from Hiiumaa for the Baltic herring catch. The building was brought to the museum in 1967, and erected from 1967 to 1968. The fishing house was torched by an arsonist on the day of the August putsch in 1991 and restored as a replica from 1991 to 1996.

Net sheds

Until the end of the 19th century, common net fences for one or more villages were situated on the beaches. These were the net sheds for various boat crews. Nets and other fishing tackle were stored there. The seafront in the Open Air Museum's island region features three net sheds from Saaremaa Island: Nasva, Toomalõuka and Alvi.

Windmills

In windy seaside areas lacking in rivers, post windmills ground grain for many generations. The entire body of the mill revolved atop a post. The small mills used on farms for single families were a sight unto themselves. They had parallels to a very ancient farm mill tradition in Scandinavia and southern Finland. Windmills were first mentioned in written documents in 14th century.

=== Stand-alone objects ===
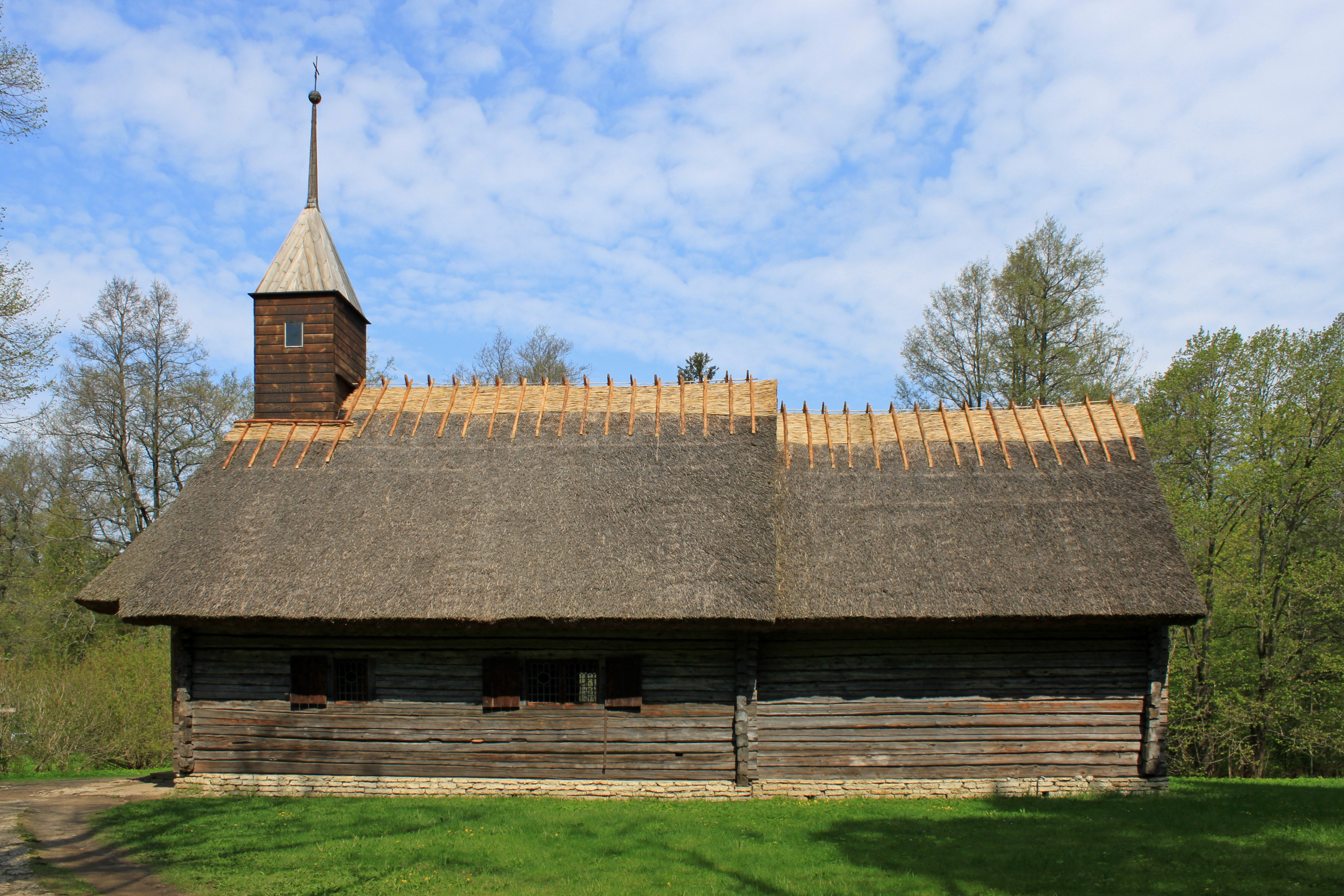
Sutlepa chapel

Sutlepa chapel

Sutlepa chapel was built in the region populated by Estonian Swedes and is one of the oldest wooden buildings in Estonia. The chapel was built in Sutlepa village of Noarootsi parish as a subordinate church to Noarootsi parish church. The construction cannot be precisely dated: archival data mention the chapel as early as in 1627, but the year engraved above the church door is ‘1699’. The chapel was brought to the museum in 1970 and erected in 1971–1976. Sutlepa chapel was re-consecrated in 1989 and has since been a subordinate church of Jaani parish of the Estonian Evangelical Lutheran Church.

Sermons are held in the chapel on major holy days and important dates of the folk calendar.

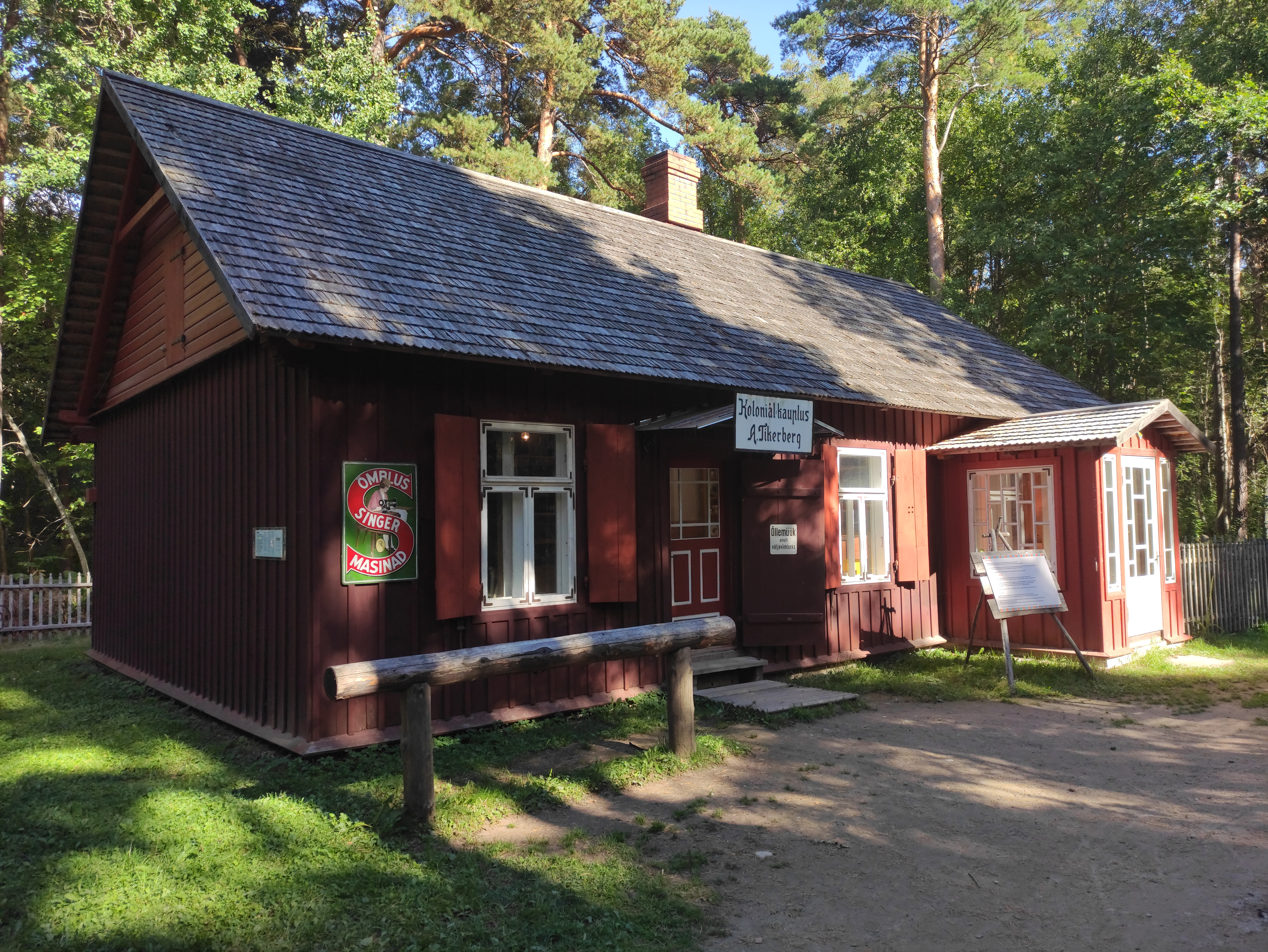
Lau shop

Lau village shop

Brought from Lau village of Juuru parish, Harju County. The shop building with rather a conventional floor plan was constructed in 1914 by Jaan Meiberg, a distiller from Ingliste manor. Brought to the museum in 1999 and opened for visitors in 2012.

Shops started emerging here and there in rural settlements in the last quarter of the 19th century when country population's demand for bought-in goods increased. By the beginning of the 20th century the network of village shops had been established. Apparently the shop was there in the tsarist era, and it certainly operated from 1925 to 1940, when the Soviet rule was established. The museum display refers to 1938, the period when Estonia's economy flourished.

Visitors can buy goods characteristic of that time in history.

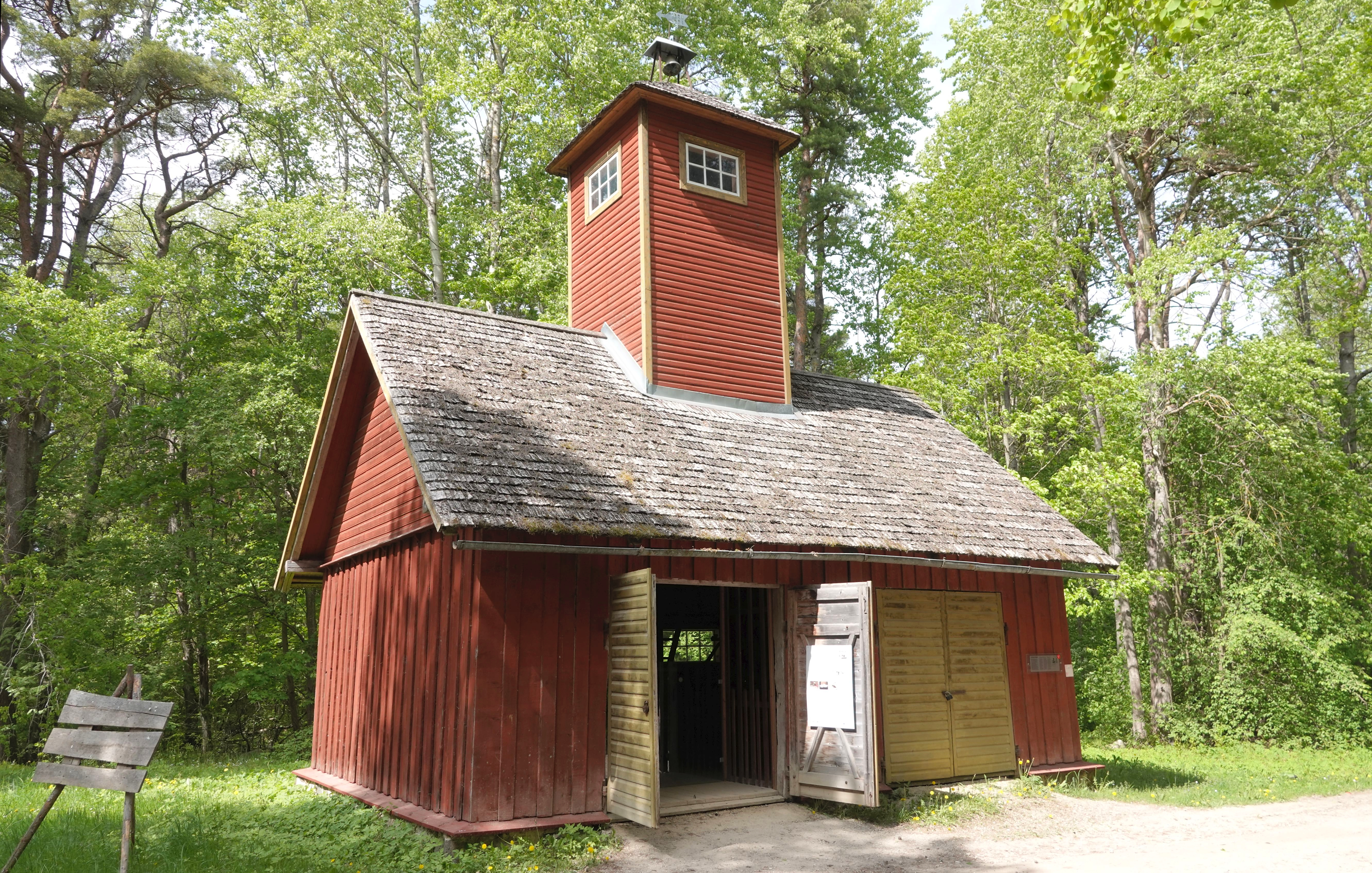
Orgmetsa fire station

Orgmetsa fire station

The fire station was built in 1928 in Orgmetsa village, Järva-Madise parish. It was brought to the museum in 1991. Such fire stations of medium size were built by rural firefighters’ societies in major Estonian villages in 1920s–1930s. Orgmetsa fire station belonged to the Aravete-Albu volunteer firefighters’ society founded in 1921. It was used to store manual fire engines with carts, barrels of water, fire hooks etc. Hoses could be dried in the tower, where the fire bell was located as well.

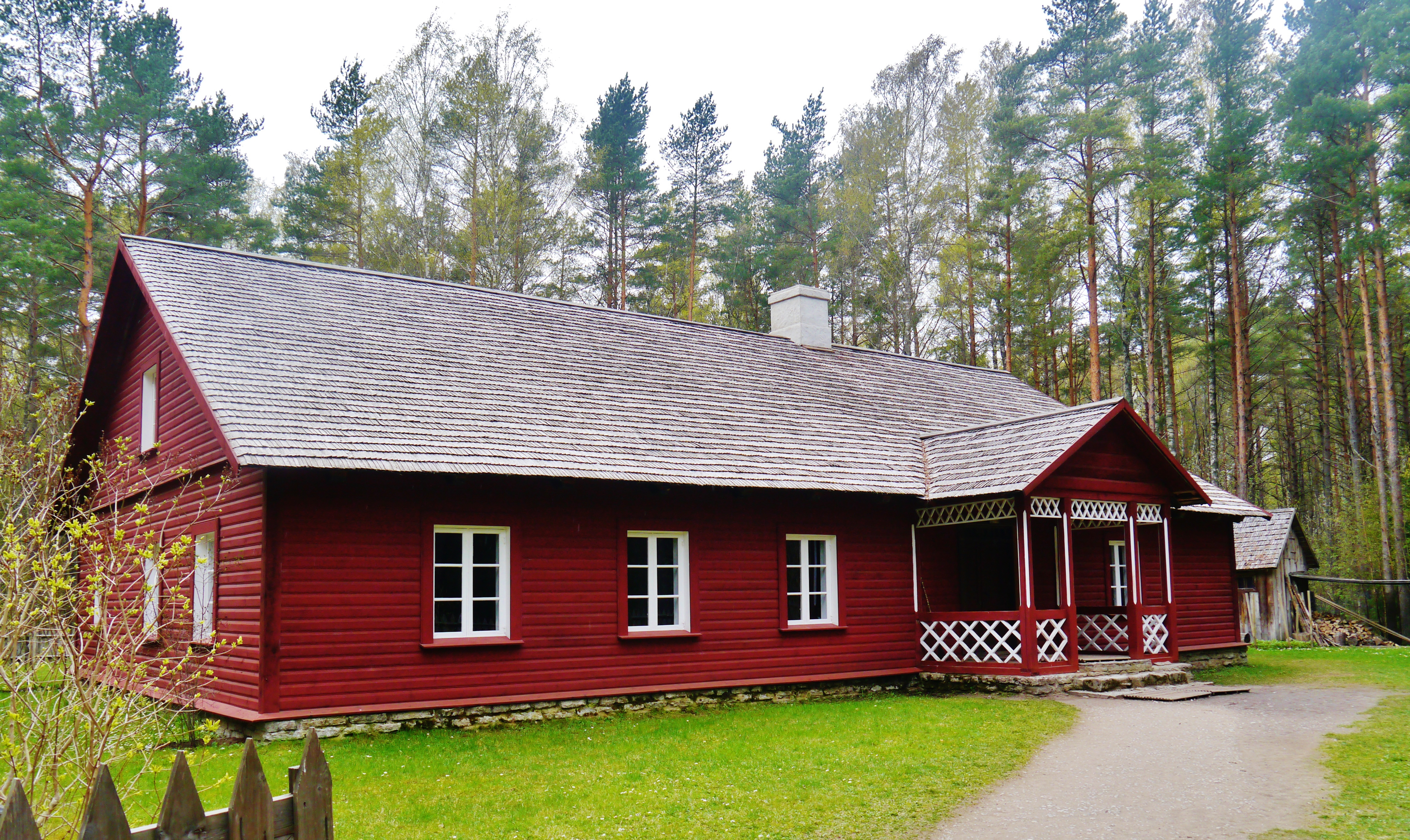
Kuie schoolhouse

Kuie schoolhouse

Kuie school was situated in Järva-Jaani parish, Kuie commune. The school building was completed in 1887. With the assistance of the founders of the Rocca al Mare school it was relocated and rebuilt in the museum in 1999, and the opening ceremony took place on 1 September 2000. From this day on it has been a home for museum's educational center.

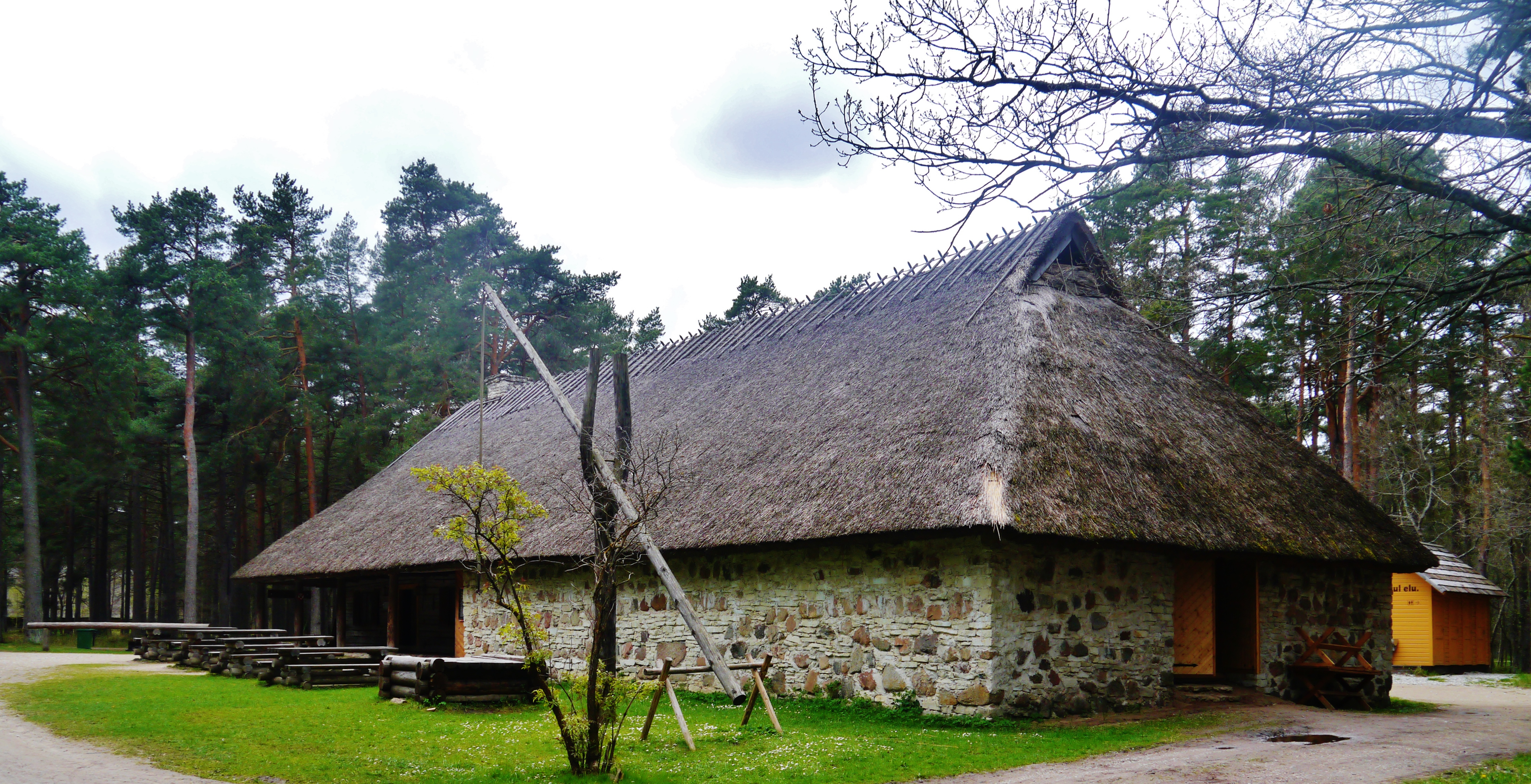
Kolu inn

Kolu tavern

Brought from Kolu village in Kose parish, Harju County. The inn with one stable located on the road from Tallinn to Tartu was built in 1840s. Brought to the museum in 1968.

Traditional Estonian meals are served at Kolu tavern for visitors.

Prefabricated wooden house

In the 21st century, Estonian wooden houses have become increasingly produced under factory conditions – construction activities have moved from the site to factories with controlled conditions. Estonia has become Europe's largest exporter of wooden houses. A modern timber building constructed in the museum in 2019 is one example of the production of Estonian house manufacturers. Originally designed as an energy efficient single-family home, the modular house introduces innovative construction technologies and materials. At the museum, the prefab wooden house accommodates the offices of the Timber Construction Competence Center and the museums' Center of Rural Architecture.

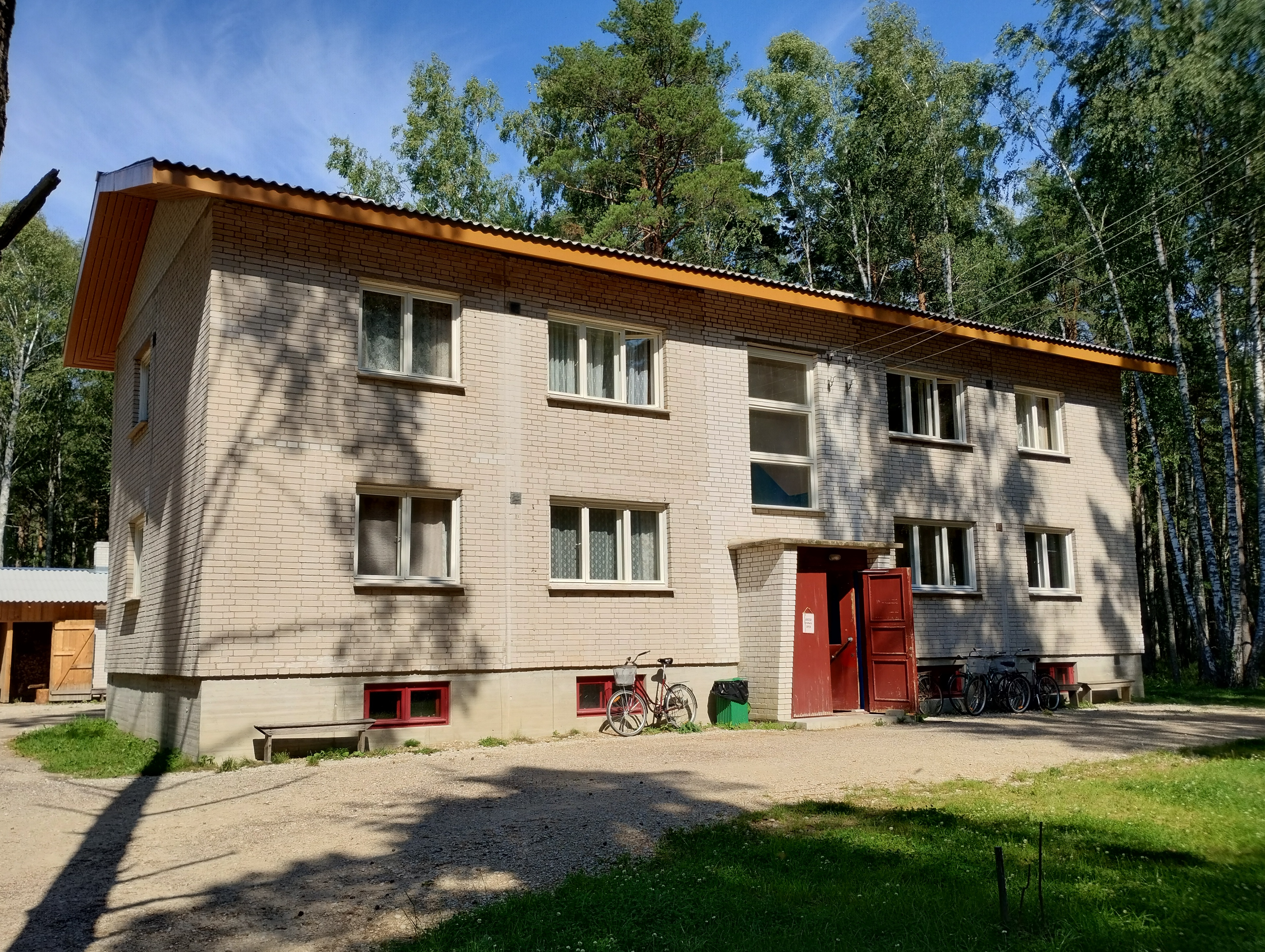
Kolhoz apartment building

Kolhoz apartment building

The silicate brick apartment house was built in 1964 for the workers of the Sookuru dairy barn at Järvesalu collective farm in Räbi village, Valga district in southern Estonia. Similar kolkhoz houses by can be found all over Estonia.

The apartment building was transported 200 km (120 mi) from Southern Estonia to Tallinn in 2019 and opened to visitors in 2021.

The building includes four three-room apartments and they provide a picture of the everyday life of rural people in the 1960s, 1970s, 1990s and 2010s. In the basement, an exhibition on the development of Estonian rural life from the establishment of collective farms to the present day is set up, along with a play and activity area, which is called The World of Little Ilmar.

== Other exhibits and attractions ==
- Museum shop at the ticket office, which offers variety of handicraft pieces, souvenirs, copies of museum exhibits, organic sweets, Estonian wine and beer, books and folk music albums
- Horse-carriage rides
- Bicycle, scooter, cart and wheelchair rentals in summer season
- Kick sledge rental in Winter season
- 3 km (1.9 mi) nature trail with eleven observation points
- Picnic area by the sea
- Guided tours
- Venues rentals for events
- Children's playgrounds with swings and board games in the Village Square and by the sea
- Sirjie Runge Art Project “Great love/ beautiful decay” (2021). The artist surrenders to nature her ten-metre oil painting "The Great Love" (2003). The monumental painting is erected in the forest within the museum on a metal structure specially built for it, and then left into the hands of the stimuli of nature.
- NUMU Mobile App contains a free audio guide, consisting of 64 points that give an overview of the exposition of the Estonian Open Air Museum, local farm architecture, Estonian history, farm life and everyday culture in seven languages: Estonian, Russian, English, Spanish, German, French, Italian and Finnish. It also contains orienteering adventure games to learn while solving tasks and games all over the museum in an augmented reality.
- The Estonian Open Air Museum is part of the geocaching game. Geocaching is an international outdoor recreational activity in which participants use a Global Positioning System (GPS) receiver or mobile device and other navigational techniques to hide and seek containers, called "geocaches" or "caches", at specific locations marked by coordinates all over the world. More than 2,000 of them are located in Estonia, and the number of treasures is constantly increasing according to the addition of players and their activity.

== Events ==
Major events:

- Shrovetide
- Easter
- Midsummer Eve
- Estonian Bread Day
- Michaelmas
- St. Martinś Day
- St. Catherines´Day
- Christmas Village
- In summer, performances of the Folklore Society Leigarid every Saturday and Sunday at 11:00 on Sassi-Jaani farm

== Conservation and Digitization Center Kanut ==
Based on the restoration departments of the National Museum of Art and National Open Air Museum, the National Restoration Center was established on 1 December 1986. The task of the center was to service the museums under Ministry of Culture of that time (ESSR Committee of Culture), and to assist other memory institutions.

The idea of the Restoration Center was initiated and set going by a recognized leather artist and conservator Endel Valk-Falk who worked as a manager of this center since its establishment until 1995. The Restoration Center got rooms for working in the Old Town of Tallinn in the building of the former printing house “Kommunist” (Communist) at Pikk Str 2 where they work also today. Eight workshops were opened in the center: ethnographic and polychromic wood, furniture, painting, leather, textile, ceramics, metal and paper restoration workshops. The center also started to organize consultations and training for museum specialists and conservators.

From 1988, a professional magazine, "Renovatum Anno" was issued.

In 1990, the institution was named as Conservation Center Kanut, which was derived from Knud Lavard, the name of a Danish duke who is also known as a patron saint of the craftsmen who were active in Tallinn for centuries.

From 2005, the Conservation Center Kanut also provides the digitization service of the items of cultural value.

== Center for Rural Architecture ==
In 2007, a programme for the study and maintenance of Estonian rural architecture was launched at the Estonian Open Air Museum. In 2012, the implementers of this programme formed a separate department under the name of the Center of Rural Architecture of the Estonian Open Air Museum.

Center of Rural Architecture is doing research on Estonian vernacular architecture, organizing seminars and consultation service for house owners.

The center received the Grand Prix of the EU Prize for Cultural Heritage / Europa Nostra Award 2015 in the Education, Training and Awareness-Raising category with the Programme for Owners of Rural Buildings in Estonia

== Choir ==
In 2008 a mixed choir was founded within the Estonian Open Air Museum and the next year, in 2009, the group participated for first time in the national song festival (in Estonian: laulupidu).

== Awards ==
On June 11, 2015, The Center of Rural Architecture of the Estonian Open Air Museum received the Grand Prix of the EU Prize for Cultural Heritage / Europa Nostra Award 2015 in the Education, Training and Awareness-Raising category with the Programme for Owners of Rural Buildings in Estonia.

== Gallery ==
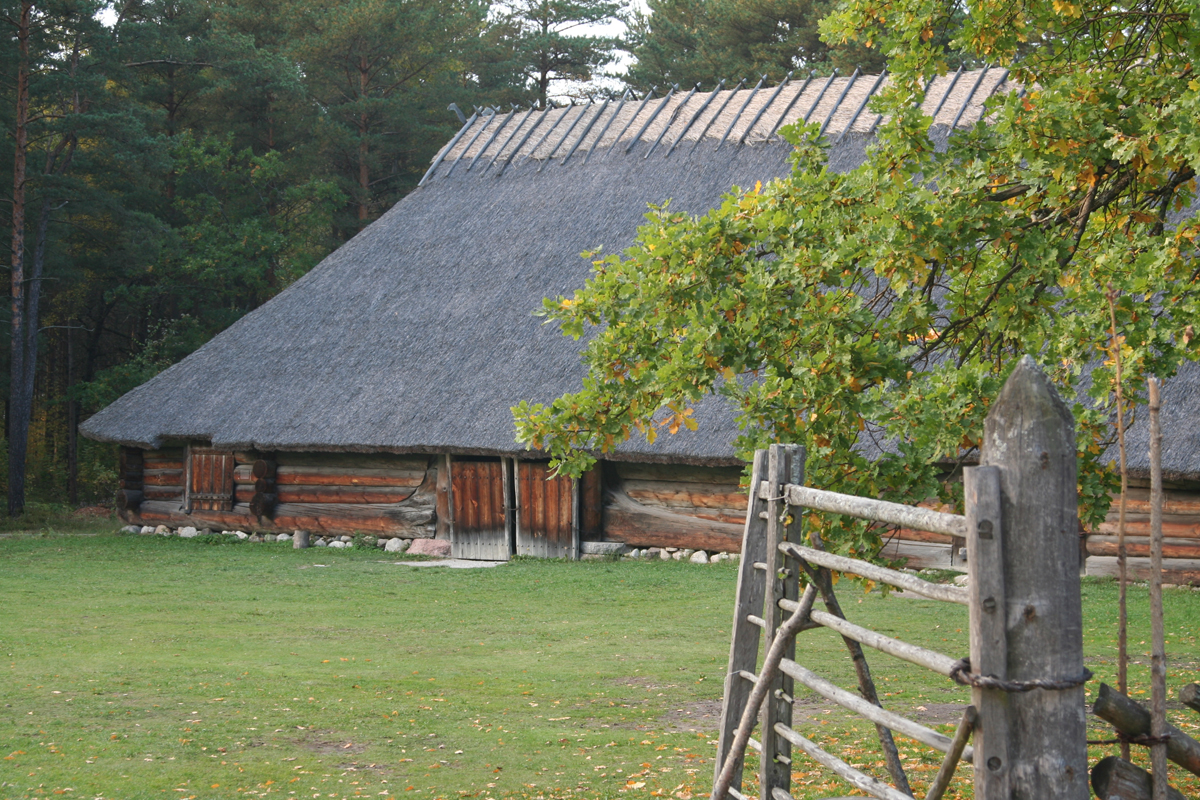
The oldest farmstead in the museum: Sassi Jaani (18-19th. century)

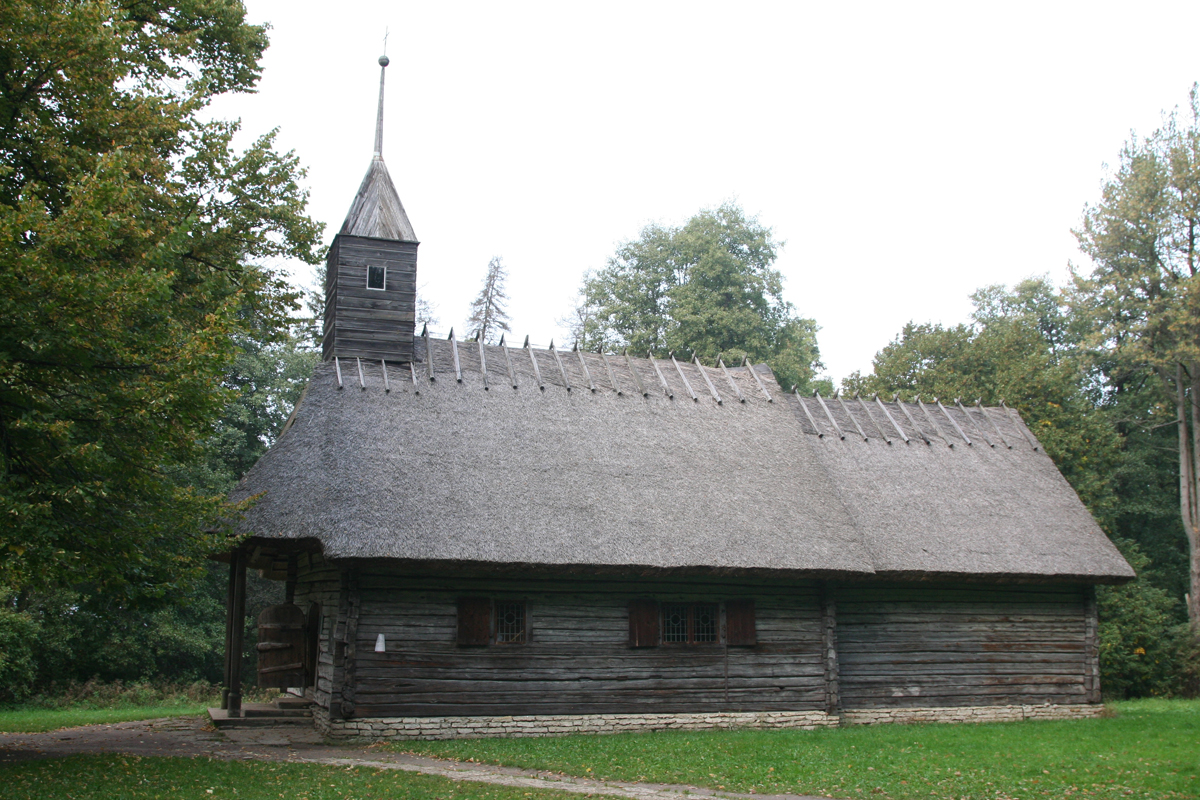
Sutlepa chapel, 19th century

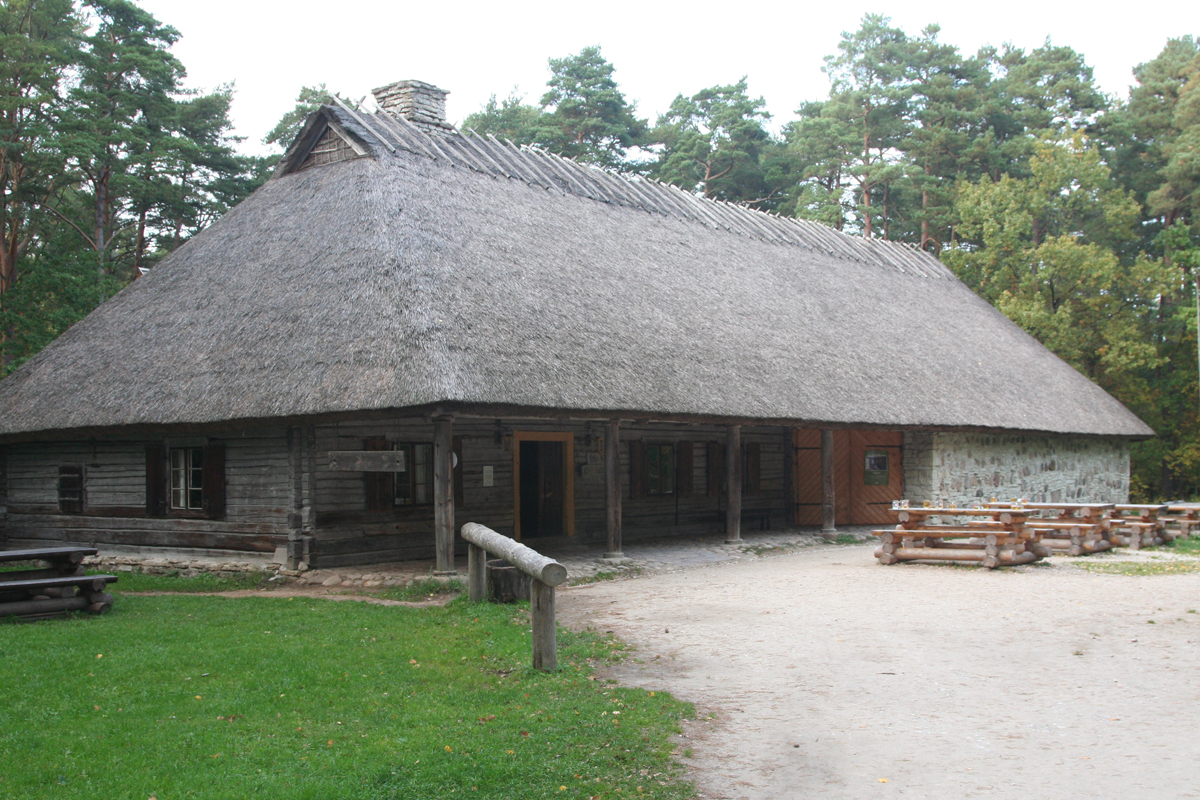
Kolu tavern, 19th century

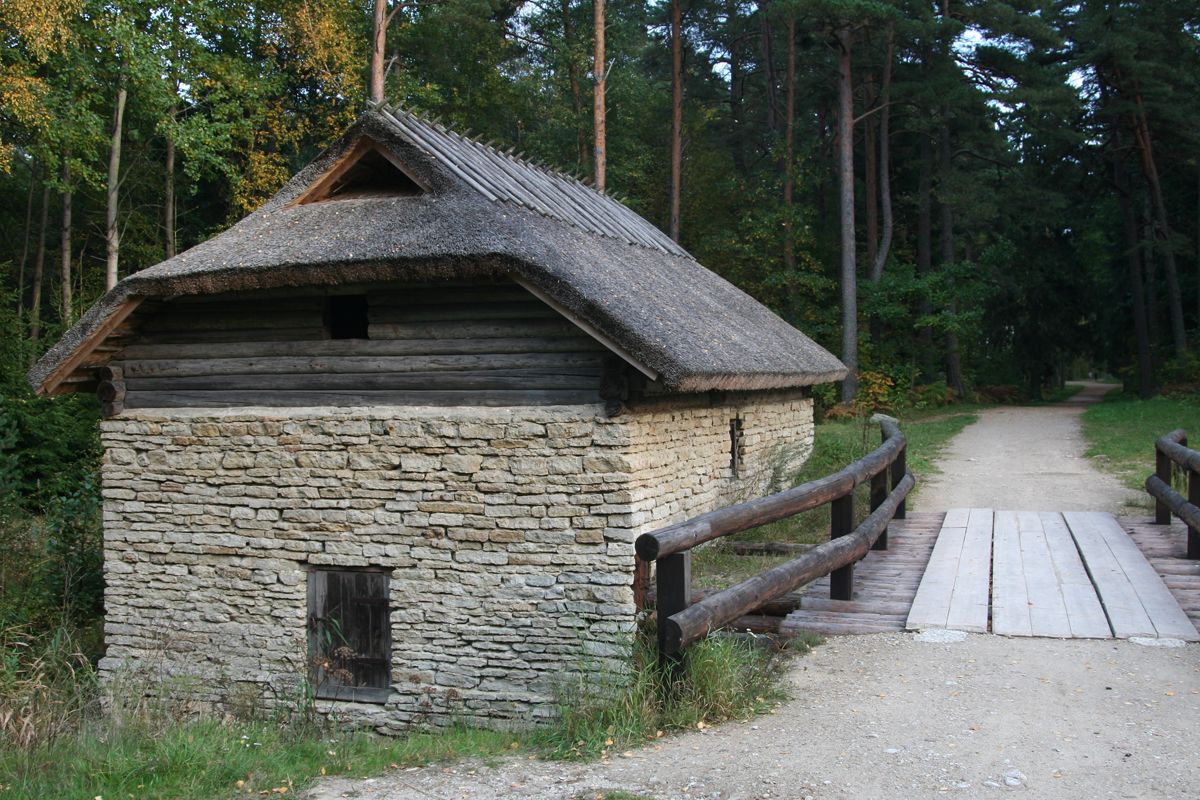
Kahala Water Mill, 19th century

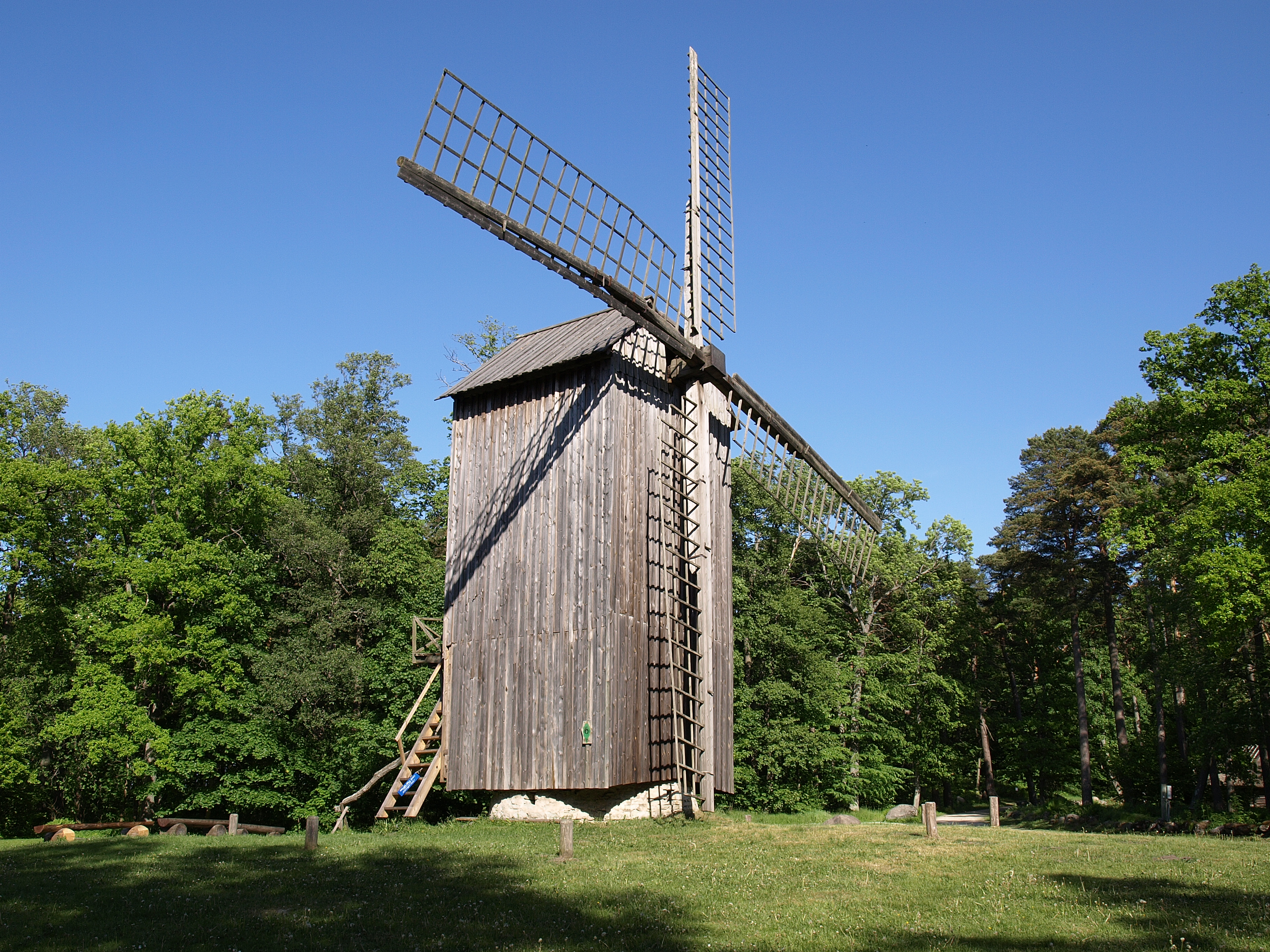
Nätsi windmill to grind grain

== See also ==
- List of open-air and living history museums
