= Kolu Inn =

Inn in Estonia; later relocated to Estonian Open Air Museum

Coordinates: 59.4336167°N 24.6406388°E

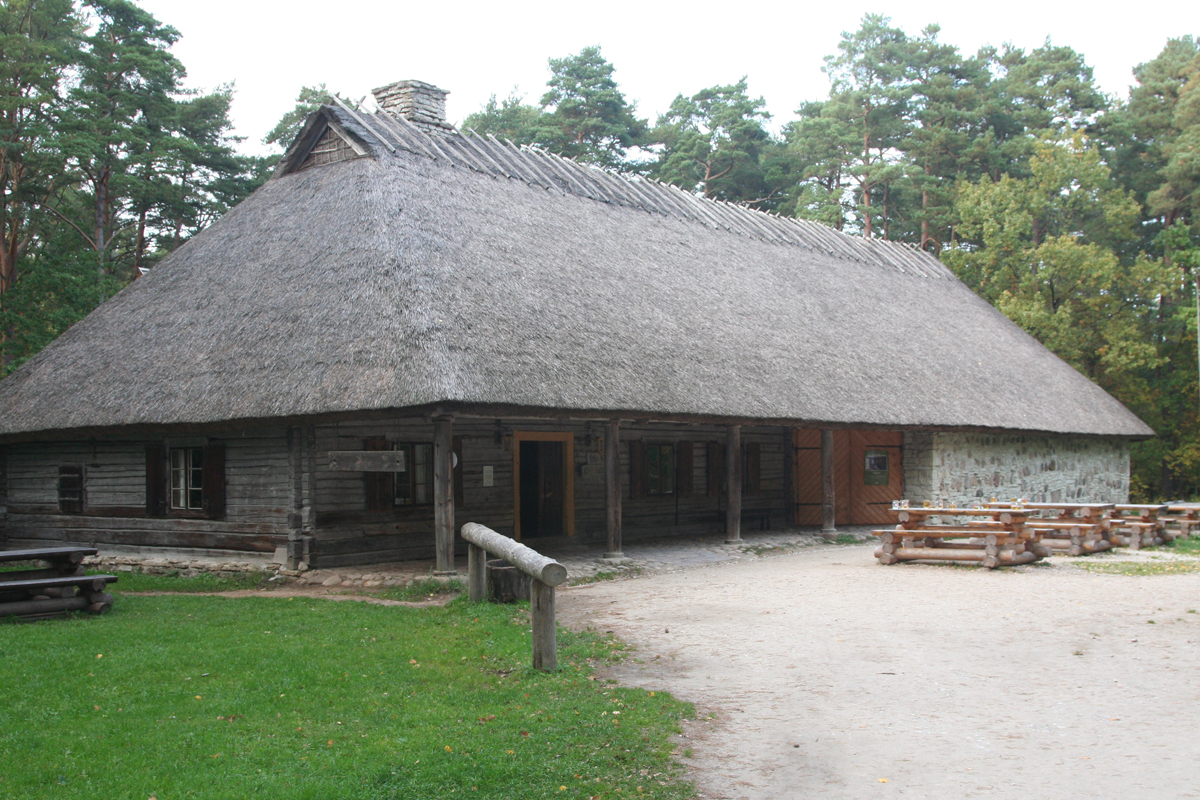
The Kolu Inn

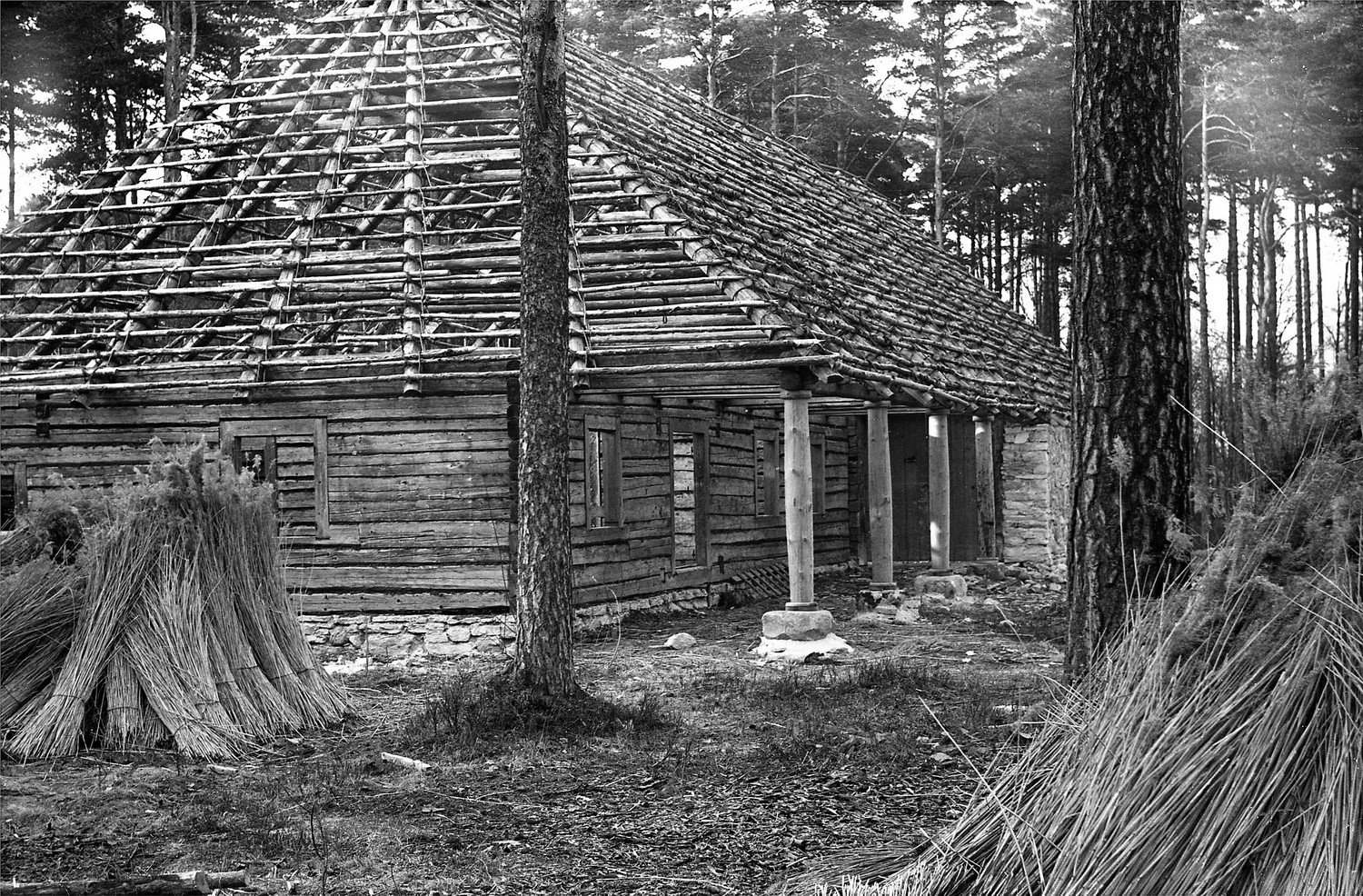
Reassembling the Kolu Inn in 1972

The Kolu Inn (Estonian: Kolu kõrts) is a relocated authentic inn originally built in the Estonian vernacular style in the village of Kolu, Harjumaa, in 1840 and currently exhibited and operated as part of the Estonian Open Air Museum.

The building was relocated to the museum in 1968 and reconstructed from 1969 to 1973. Since 1993, a restaurant has operated inside the building. The restaurant serves traditional Estonian cuisine.

This inn is relatively small, with only one stable room.

== Sources ==
- Exposition list at the Estonian Open Air Museum's website
