= Kolu, Lääne-Viru County =

Village in Estonia

- Village
- Location within Estonia
- Coordinates: 59.354°N 26.0149°E
- Country: Estonia
- County: Lääne-Viru County
- Parish: Kadrina Parish
- Time zone: UTC+2 (EET)
  - Summer (DST): UTC+3 (EEST)

Kolu is a village in Kadrina Parish, Lääne-Viru County Estonia.
