= Kalu, Varzaqan =

Kalu كلو
- Village
- Location within Iran
- Coordinates: 38°42′04″N 46°18′32″E
- Country: Iran
- Province: East Azerbaijan
- County: Varzaqan
- Bakhsh: Kharvana
- Rural District: Dizmar-e Markazi

Population (2006)
  - Total: 77
- Time zone: UTC+3:30 (IRST)
  - Summer (DST): UTC+4:30 (IRDT)

Kalu (Persian: كلو, also Romanized as Kalū, Kaloo, and Kalow; also known as Chalow, Chelou, Chelow, Chelū, Chilov, and Chīlowv) is a village in Dizmar-e Markazi Rural District, Kharvana District, Varzaqan County, East Azerbaijan Province, Iran. At the 2006 census, its population was 77, in 24 families.
