= Kalow, Afghanistan =

Kalow Kalu
- Location in Afghanistan
- Coordinates: 34°39′N 68°2′E
- Country: Afghanistan
- Province: Bamyan Province
- Time zone: + 4.30

Kalow or Kalu is a village in Shibar District of Bamyan Province, in central Afghanistan. It is located close to the border with Maidan Wardak Province.

== See also ==
- Bamyan Province
