= Kalu, Hormozgan =

Kalu كلو
- Village
- Location within Iran
- Coordinates: 27°12′42″N 56°58′01″E
- Country: Iran
- Province: Hormozgan
- County: Minab
- Bakhsh: Central
- Rural District: Howmeh

Population (2006)
  - Total: 112
- Time zone: UTC+3:30 (IRST)
  - Summer (DST): UTC+4:30 (IRDT)

Kalu (Persian: كلو, also Romanized as Kalū and Kolū) is a village in Howmeh Rural District, in the Central District of Minab County, Hormozgan Province, Iran. At the 2006 census, its population was 112, in 28 families.
