= Kalow, Dargaz =

Kalow كالو
- Village
- Location within Iran
- Coordinates: 37°15′00″N 59°07′06″E
- Country: Iran
- Province: Razavi Khorasan
- County: Dargaz
- Bakhsh: Chapeshlu
- Rural District: Qara Bashlu

Population (2006)
  - Total: 214
- Time zone: UTC+3:30 (IRST)
  - Summer (DST): UTC+4:30 (IRDT)

Kalow (Persian: كالو, also Romanized as Kālow) is a village in Qara Bashlu Rural District, Chapeshlu District, Dargaz County, Razavi Khorasan Province, Iran. At the 2006 census, its population was 214, in 44 families.
