= Laupa =

Village in Estonia

- Village
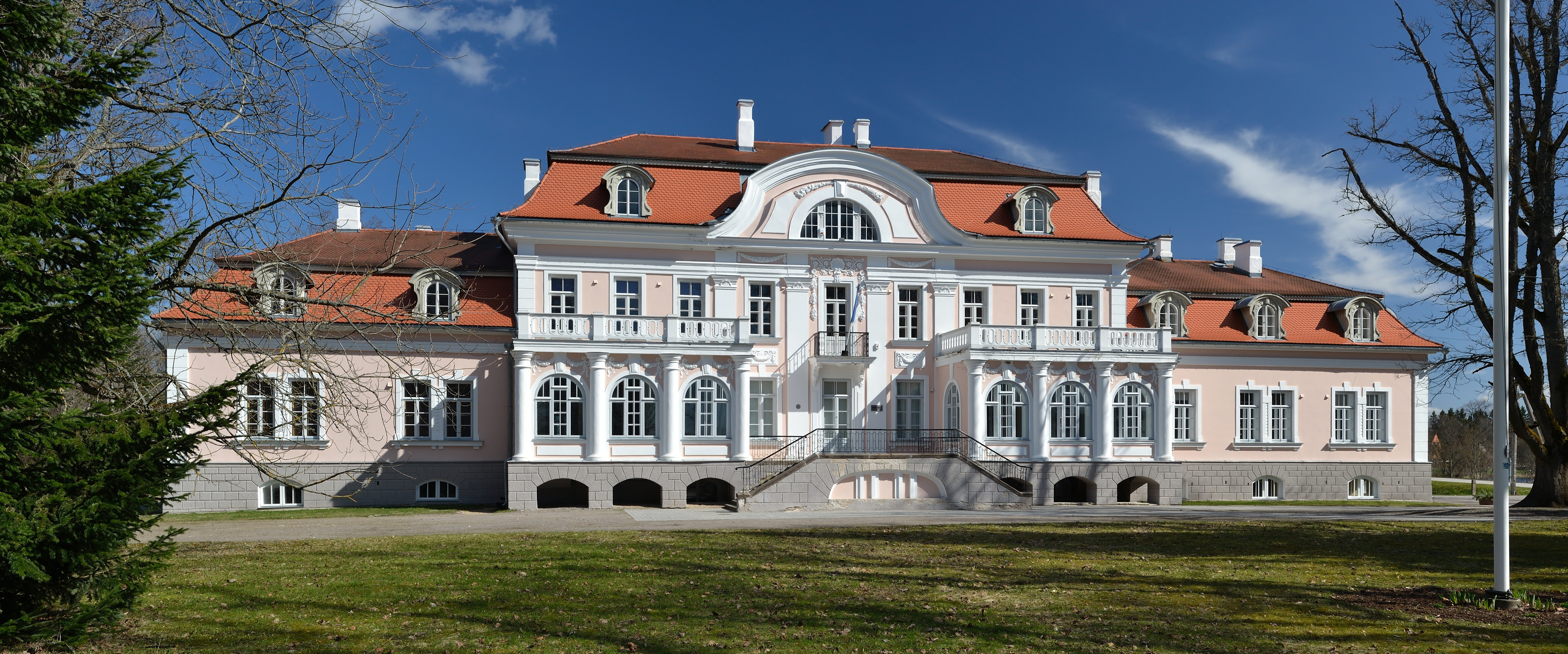
- Laupa Manor

- Location within Estonia
- Coordinates: 58°45′30″N 25°22′10″E
- Country: Estonia
- County: Järva County
- Parish: Türi Parish
- Time zone: UTC+2 (EET)
  - Summer (DST): UTC+3 (EEST)

Laupa is a village in Türi Parish, Järva County in central Estonia.

== Laupa manor ==
Laupa estate was established at the beginning of the 17th century. A wooden house was built at the site in 1853–55 by the Taube family but it was burnt down by insurgents during the revolt of 1905.

The current building was designed by Tallinn-based architect Jacques Rosenbaum in 1910 and completed in 1913. The style is an eclectic neo-Baroque architecture with strong Art Nouveau and neo-Rococo influences. The manor is considered to be one of Rosenbaum's most historically faithful buildings. The building is richly decorated with pilasters, half-columns, terraces, balustrades, stucco garlands and rococo sea shells. Some of the decorations were produced in the renowned workshop of sculptor August Volz in Riga. The manor is considered to be one of the most artistically accomplished manor houses in Estonia.

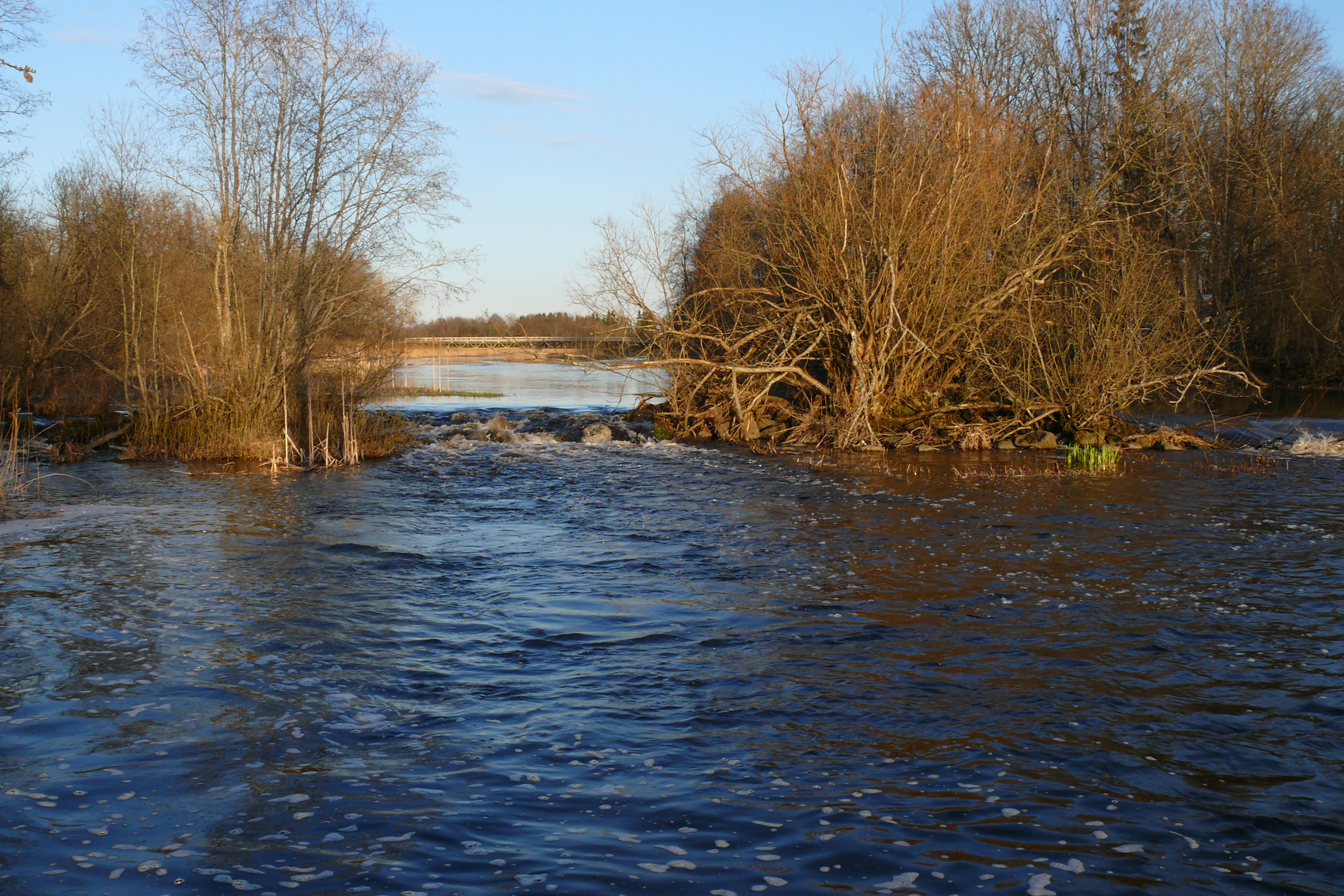
The Pärnu River in Laupa

== See also ==
- List of palaces and manor houses in Estonia
