= Jacques Rosenbaum =

Estonian architect

- Born: Jacques Gustav-Adolf Rosenbaum-Ehrenbush; 1 July 1878; Haapsalu, Russian Empire
- Died: 6 January 1944 (aged 65); Berlin, Germany
- Occupation: Architect

Jacques Rosenbaum (full name: Jacques Gustav-Adolf Rosenbaum-Ehrenbush) (1 July 1878 in Haapsalu, Estonia, former Russian Empire – 6 January 1944 in Berlin, then Nazi Germany) was an Estonian architect of Baltic German descent. Between 1904 and 1907 he served as municipal architect of Tartu, Estonia, and is best known for his Art Nouveau buildings in Tallinn.

== Early life ==
Rosenbaum was the second child of Moritz Leonhard Gabriel Rosenbaum (1846–1907) and Mathilde von Liphardt. He came from a Baltic German bourgeois family. His father was a lawyer and his paternal grandfather was also an architect. He grew up in Haapsalu and Tallinn.

From 1889 to 1896, Rosenbaum studied at the Tallinn Peter's Real School, after which he went on to the Riga Polytechnic Institute, now in Latvia. In Riga, Rosenbaum initially studied chemistry (1896–1898), but then transferred to architecture and graduated from the school in 1904. Rosenbaum belonged to the Rubonia Corporation, a Baltic German student group.

In 1897, Rosenbaum married Adrienne Kerkovius. The couple had five children.

After finishing his studies in 1904, Rosenbaum became town architect of Tartu. In 1907, he left the position and moved to Tallinn.

== Main works, 1907–1919 ==
Rosenbaum's most productive and arguably most creative time as an architect was during the years 1907–1919, when he became the principal Estonian architect to adopt the style called Art Nouveau. His first projects of this time (including a project for a rebuilding of the House of the Blackheads), which were not executed, were historicist in style, drawing much inspiration from German Renaissance architecture.

Rosenbaum was employed until 1912 as a junior engineer of the construction department of the provincial government, and then from 1916 to 1918 as a senior foreman in the Maritime Security Government. During World War I, the architect left Estonia with his family and moved to Greifswald, Germany.

In the early 1920s, Rosenbaum returned to Tallinn, but did not stay there permanently. His last project built in Estonia was the Seamen's Home, which was completed in 1926. In 1932, he and his wife joined Hitler's National Socialist Workers' Party (NSDAP). In the 1930s, he worked as a technician at the Luftwaffe, and later in the Ministry of Armaments and Military Industry. Jacques Rosenbaum died on 6 January 1944 in Berlin.

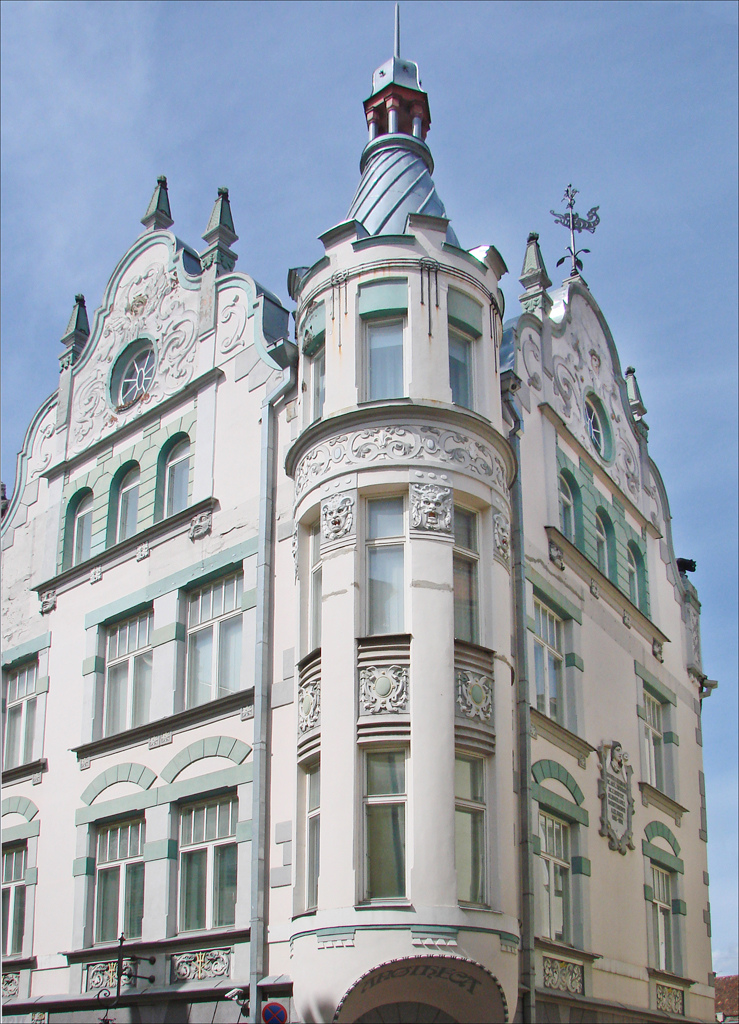
The building on Pikk 23/25.

=== House on Pikk 23/25 ===
In 1908, Rosenbaum completed a project for one Reinhold Reichmann on the corner of the two streets Pikk and Hobuspea in old town, Tallinn. In this, the first building by Rosenbaum that was actually built, his eclectic style and love of ornamentation is already apparent. The building is not easily classified aesthetically into either of the then-popular architectural styles. It shows influences of Art Nouveau, German neo-Renaissance and neo-Mannerism, all of which is expressed in the wealth of ornamentation. Among the details, a comical sculpture of an old man gazing across the street through his pince-nez has given rise to plenty of local stories. This and the other ornamentation was executed by the renowned Riga-based sculptor August Volz.

The building on Pikk 23/25 also displays Rosenbaum's ideas on town planning, in that the architect has tried to enliven the urban space through the use of a corner tower with a twisting dome, balconies and other architectural ornamentation. It has been suggested that he was inspired by the theoretical works of Camillo Sitte in this and other projects.

The house on Pikk 23/25 was well received in the local press, and helped establish Rosenbaum as an architect in Tallinn.

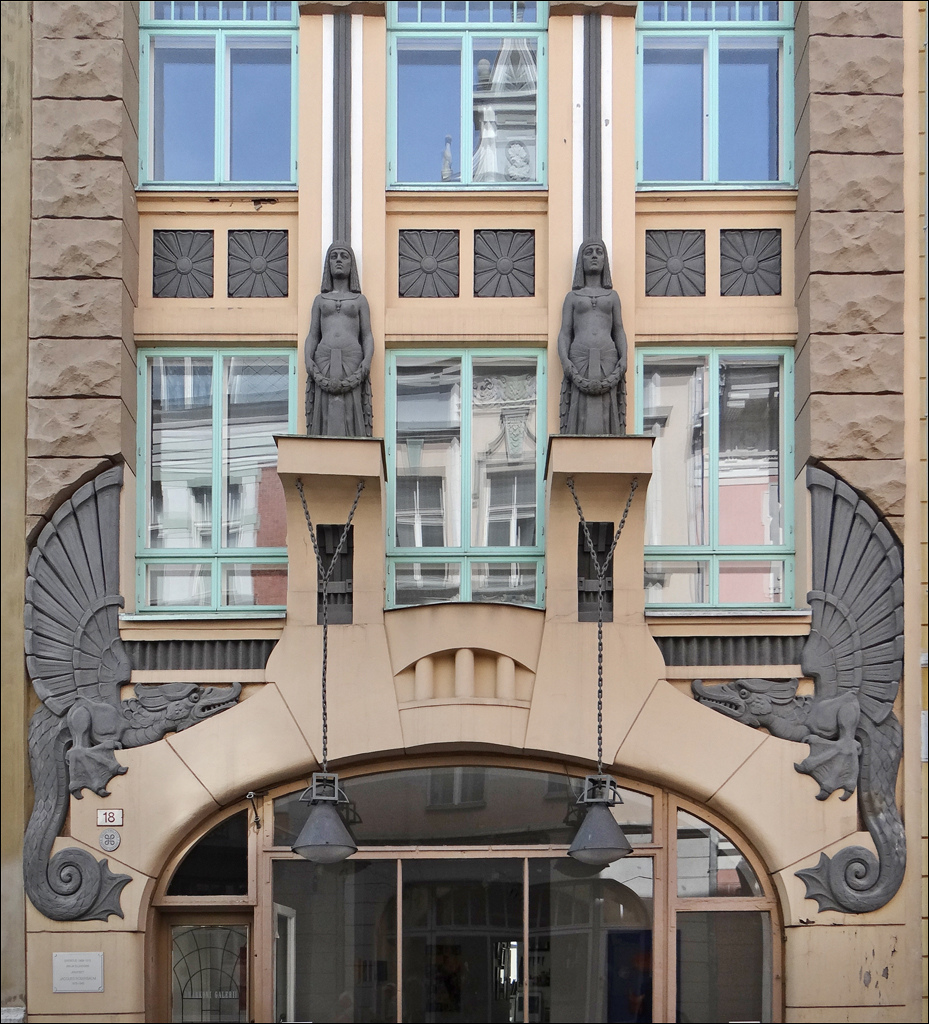
The building on Pikk 18.

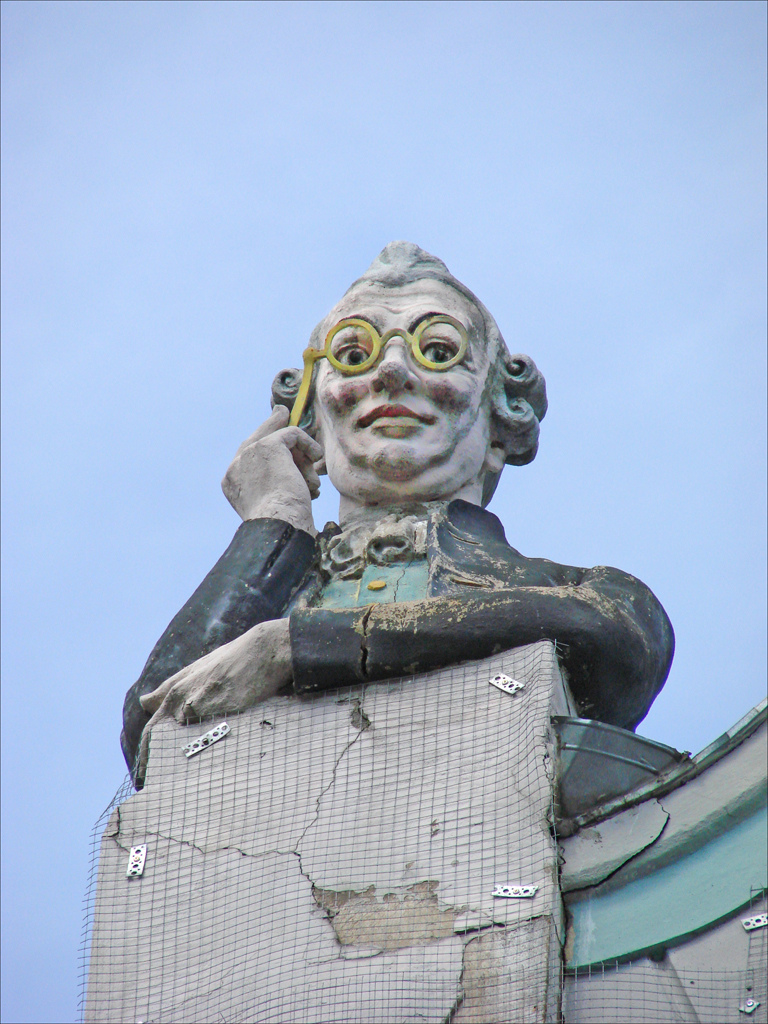
Detail on the house on Pikk 23/25

=== House on Pikk 18 ===
In 1910, Rosenbaum completed another project for Reinhold Reichman, this time on Pikk 18 – just across the street from the earlier building. This building, possibly the most well-known Art Nouveau building in Tallinn, is a decidedly more purely Art Nouveau. Two large dragons, again sculpted by August Volz, flank a single large typically curved window on the ground floor. Above it, two stern Egyptian women with bare torsos emphasise the verticality of the façade. The Egyptian theme is repeated by two herms just below the roof-line. As in Art Nouveau architecture in general, and the contemporary symbolist movement in the arts, these ornaments were intended to convey a meaning or message apart from the purely decorative; however, as to exactly what they are intended to symbolise, there seems to be no clear consensus.

=== House on Harju 9 ===
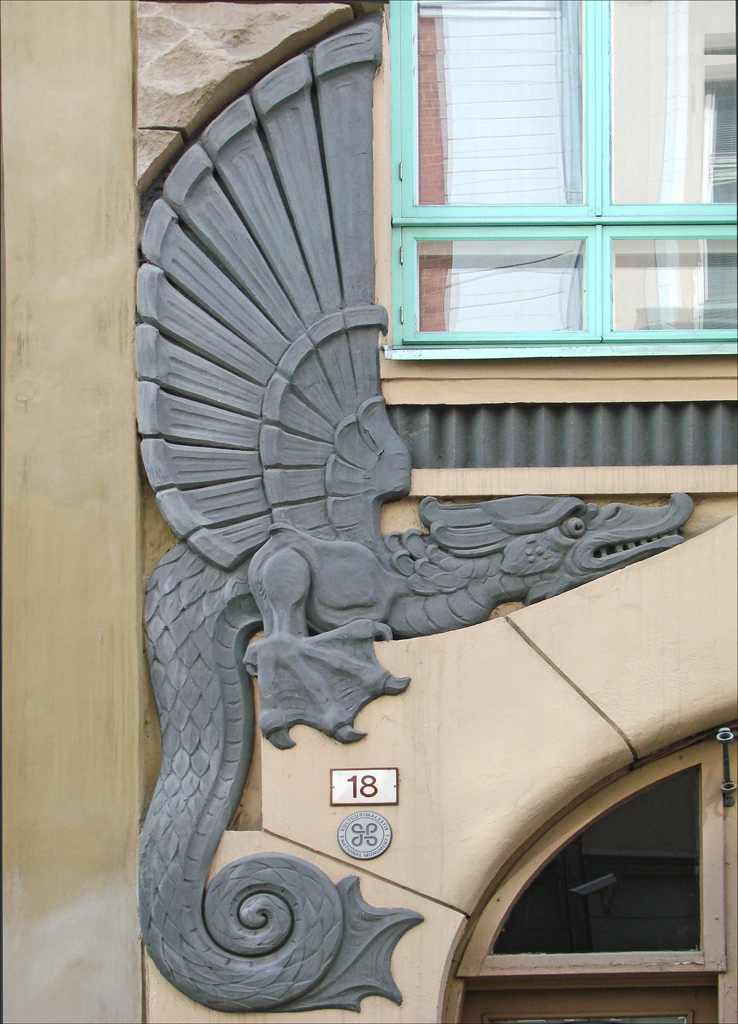
House on Pikk 18, detail.

Almost simultaneously, Rosenbaum worked on a project for a bank on Harju 9 in Tallinn. In 1909, the building was completed. Here again Rosenbaum started out with a proposal for a relatively strictly Art Nouveau building, but the project was revised and built in a slightly less extravagant, more traditional and historicist style. During World War II, the building was severely damaged and in the subsequent restoration many of the sculpted details were not recreated. Thus, the building at Harju 9 is a plainer, limestone building which is clearly neo-Renaissance in style.

=== House on Roosikrantsi 15 ===
In 1911–12, a tenement house for Gustav Leppenberg, a craftsman and piano-maker, was built by Rosenbaum's design on the street Roosikrantsi, number 15. Here, Rosenbaum combined Art Nouveau forms with neo-Baroque influences. A symmetrical façade, not typical for the Art Nouveau movement, is decorated with sculpted lions' heads. In this, Rosenbaum's biographer Karin Hallas-Murula traces influences both from the lively Art Nouveau scene in Riga and architects such as Mikhail Eisenstein and the highly influential Viennese architect Otto Wagner.

=== Laupa Manor ===
In the same baroque-influenced style as the house on Roosikrantsi, but this time also incorporating rococo elements, is Laupa manor house in central Estonia, built in 1910–1913 and designed by Rosenbaum. It is a symmetrical composition, and – typical for Rosenbaum – with a richly decorated façade.

== Later life ==
In 1919, Rosenbaum moved with his family to Greifswald in Germany, but returned to Tallinn already in 1920. In 1921, he assumed Estonian citizenship and became a partner in the architect firm Roma. However, his style had started to go out of fashion, and in the new Estonian republic, new and more Estonian ideals in building were sought. His most notable work from this period is the Seamen's home on Uus-Sadama 14/Tuukri 13, completed in 1926.

In 1928, Rosenbaum returned to Germany, where he joined the Nazi Party in 1932 at the same time with his wife. He worked in the 1930s for the Luftwaffe in doing various technical jobs, and after 1942, for the Ministry of Armaments and War Production. In 1943 he was appointed an advisor in occupied Riga for Organisation Todt. Because of declining health, he returned to Berlin in 1943, and died there on 6 January 1944.

== Style ==
Most of Rosenbaum's work is categorized as Art Nouveau, although there is much influence from classicistic and Heimatstil architecture. Strong influences for his style came from the Art Nouveau movement in Riga at the beginning of the 20th century, as well as Finnish national romanticism. Rosenbaum's style is often characterized by fantastic sculptures and decorations. Besides several apartment buildings, private dwellings and villas, Rosenbaum also designed factories and one fire-station during his Tallinn years, reflecting the fact that in the relatively small city that Tallinn was at the time, an architect had to do all sorts of jobs.

== Gallery ==
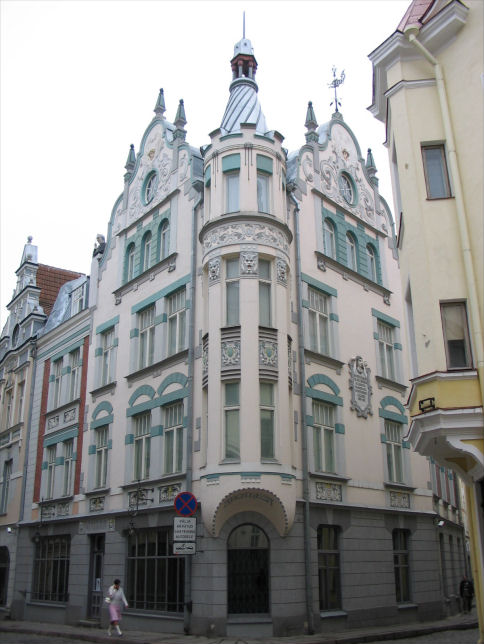
Building on Pikk 23/25.

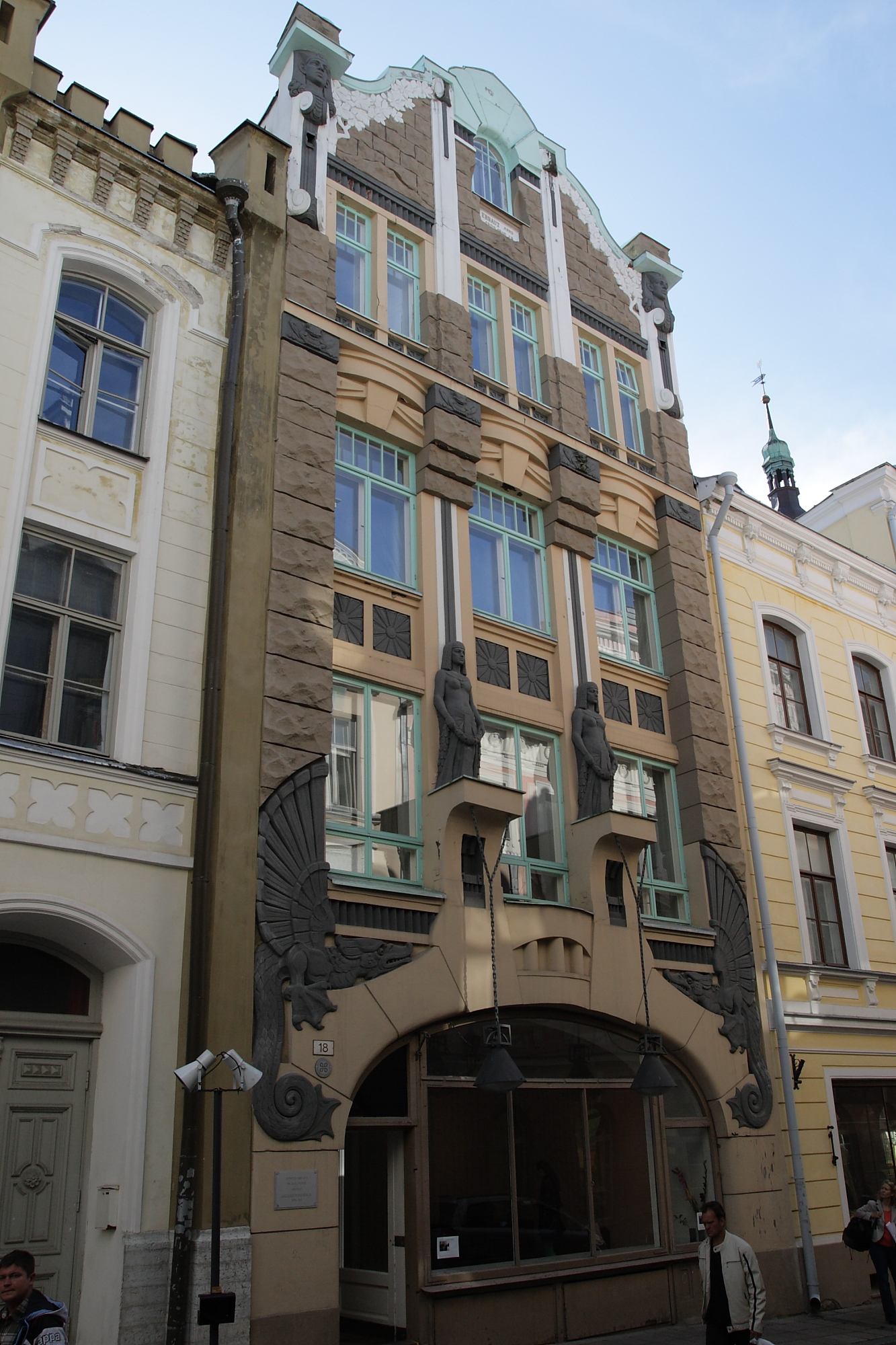
Building on Pikk 18

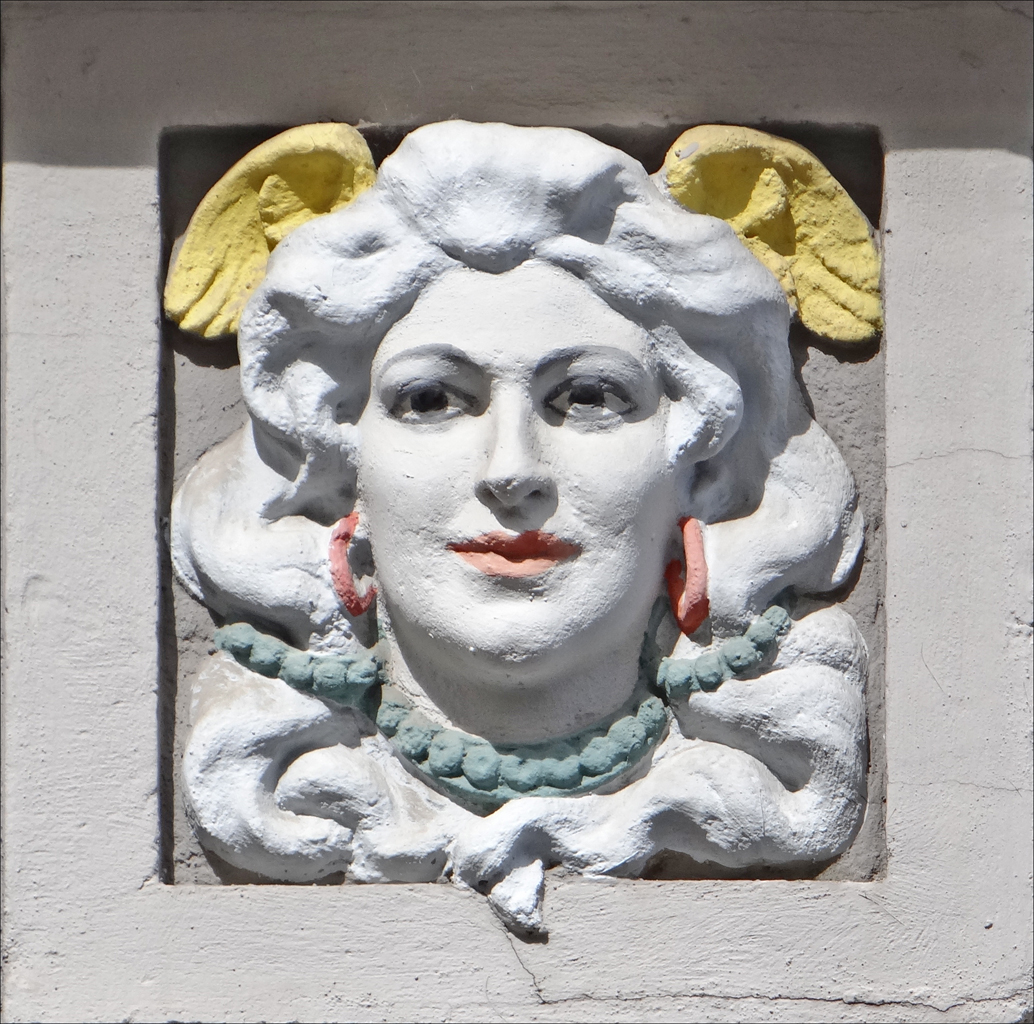
Building on Pikk 23/25, detail

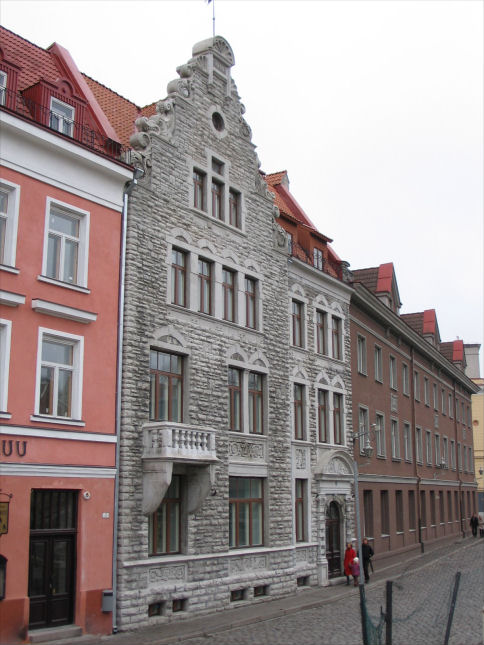
Building on Harju 9

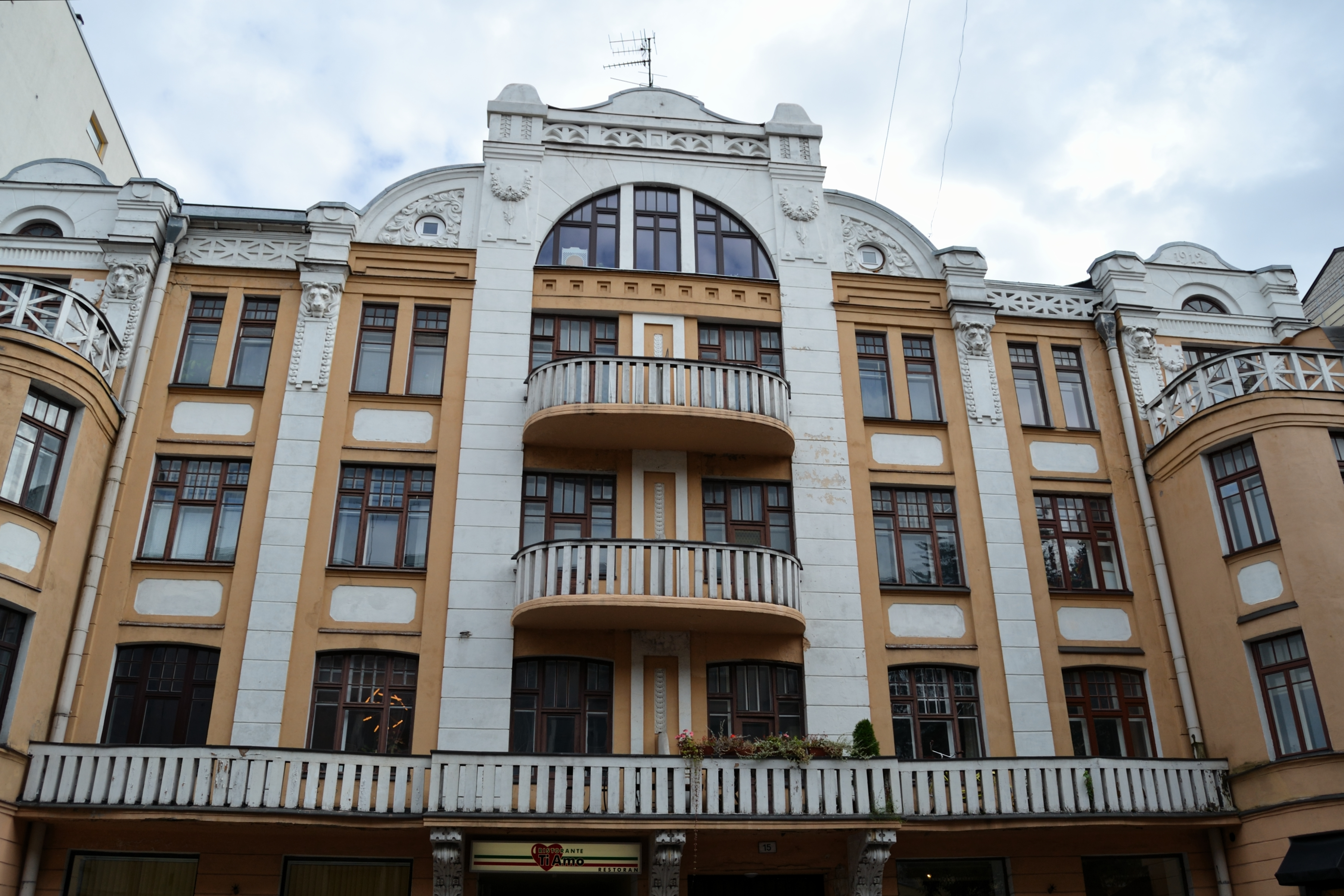
Building on Roosikrantsi 15

Süda street 3 in Tallinn, designed with Ernst Gustav Kühnert in 1913.

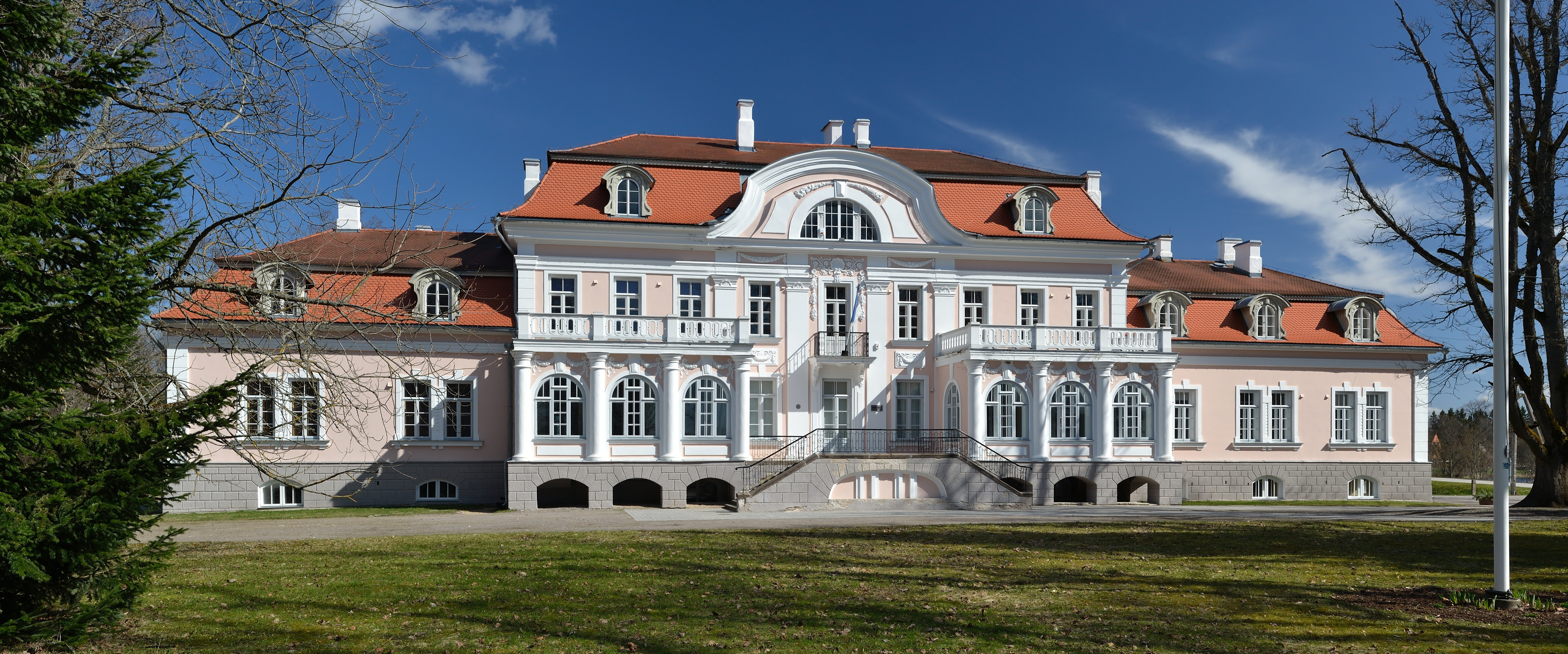
Laupa manor, Järva county

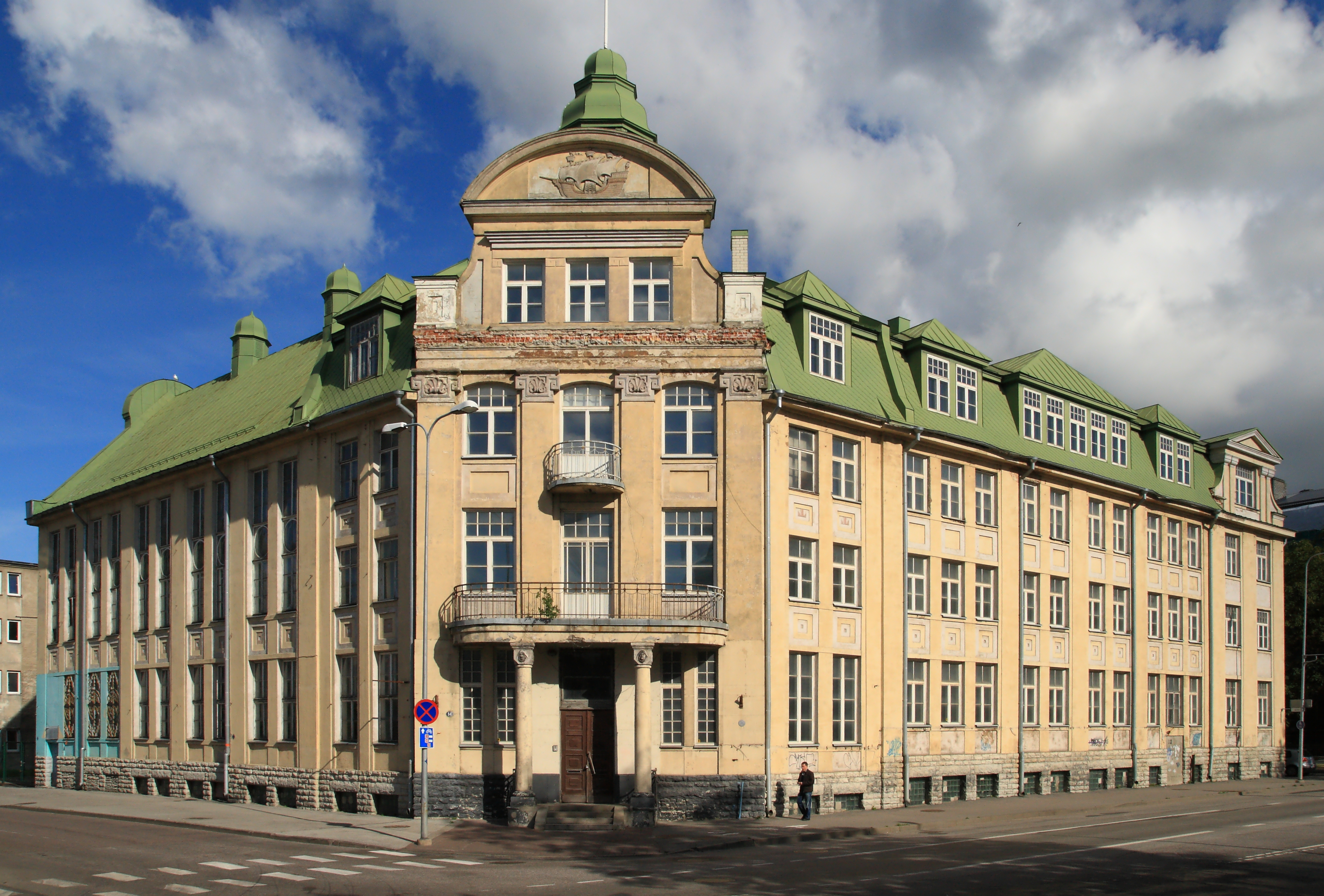
Building on Uus-Sadama 14/Tuukri 13

== Bibliography ==
- Karin Hallas-Murula, Tallinna juugendarhitektuur. Jacques Rosenbaum (1878–1944). Tallinn: Eesti Arhitektuurimuuseum, 2010.

== See also ==
- Architecture of Estonia
- List of Baltic German architects
