= Estonian vernacular architecture =

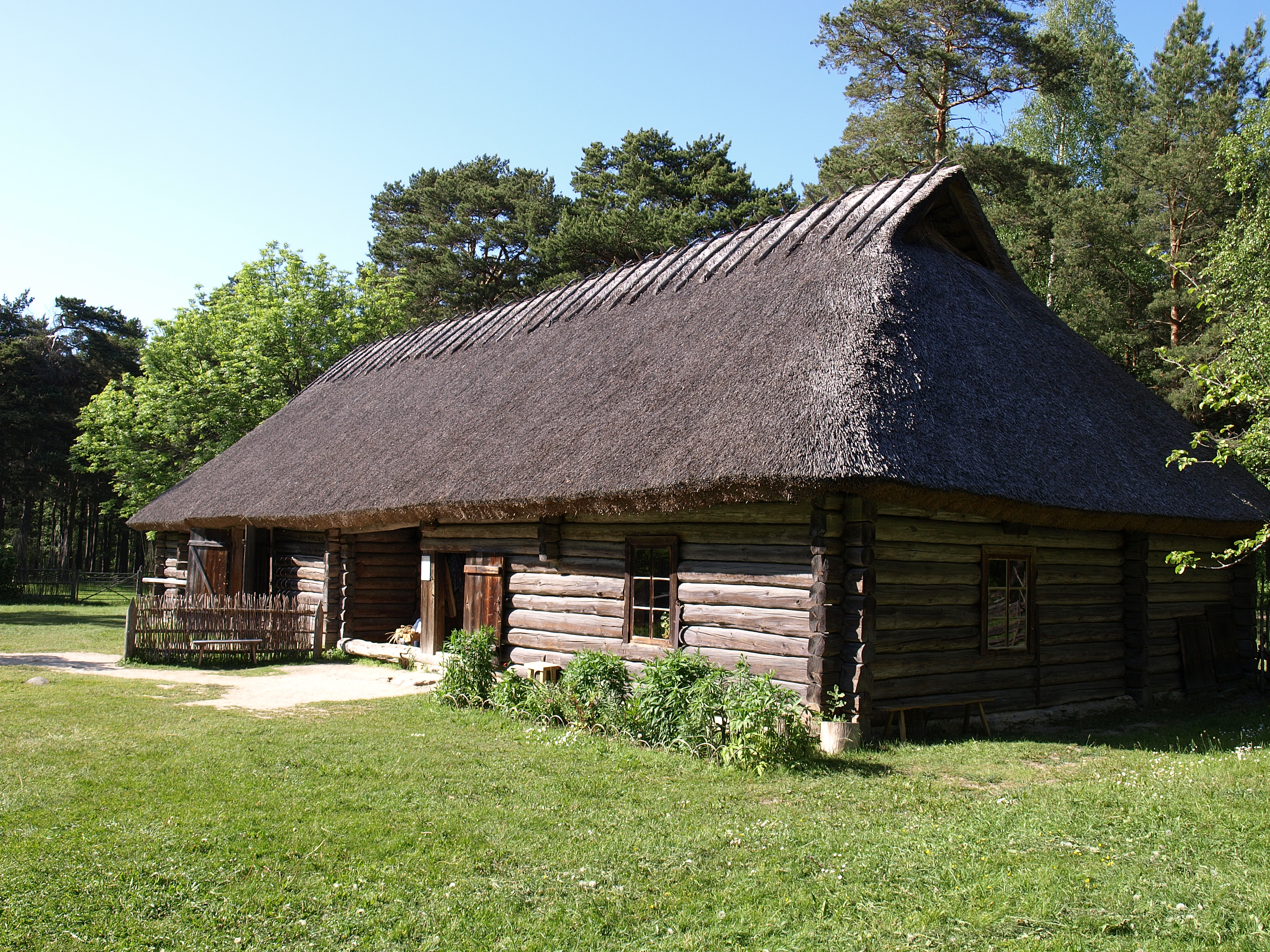
An example of Estonian vernacular architecture.

The Estonian vernacular architecture consists of a number of traditional vernacular architectural styles throughout Estonia, embodied in villages, farmyards and farm houses. The oldest written sources describing Estonian villages date back to the 13th century, when they were mentioned in the Liber Census Daniae and by the chronicler Henry of Livonia.

== Villages and farmyards ==
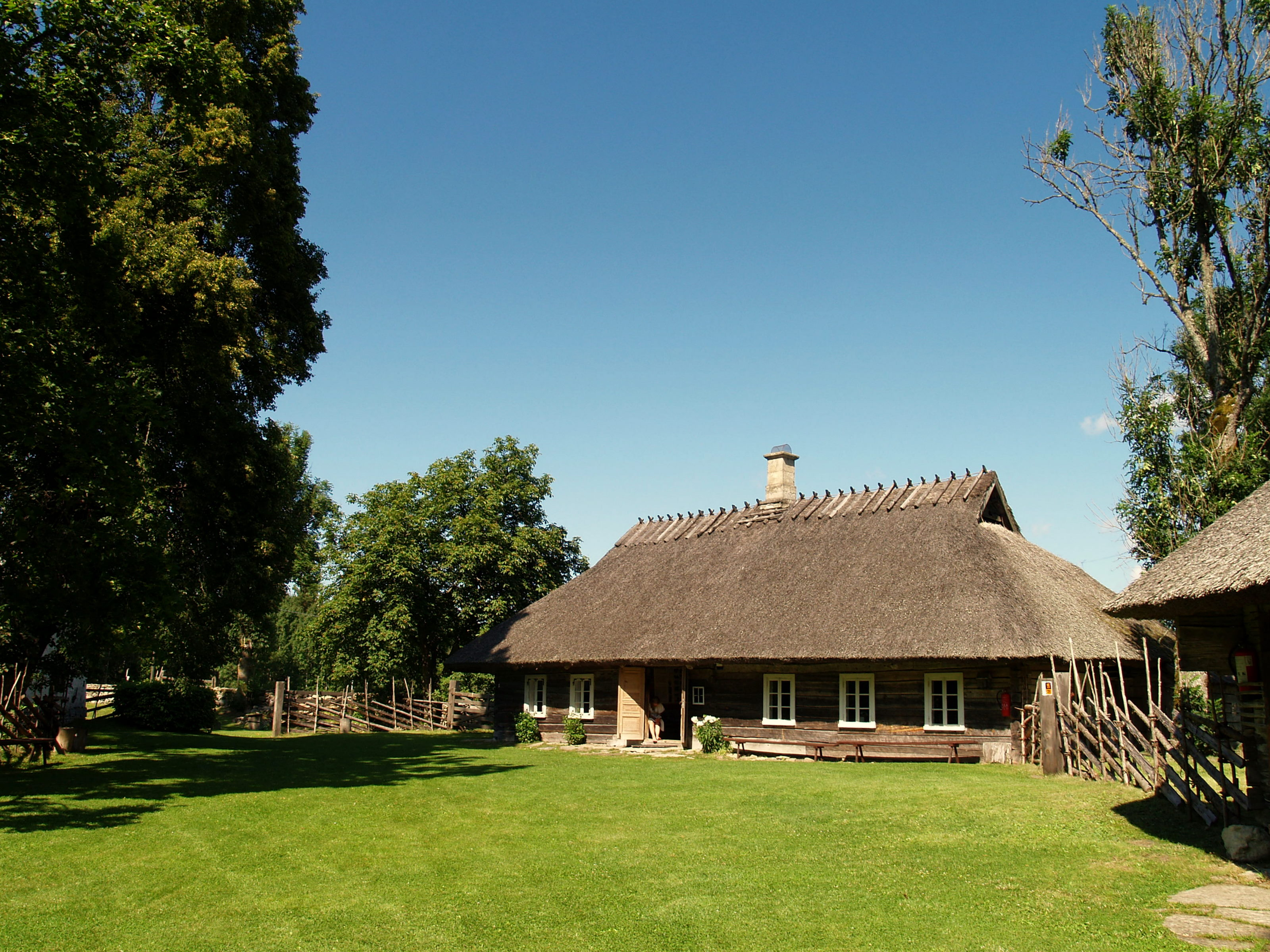
Mihkli Farm Museum in Viki village.

Village styles varied according to geographical regions, each having its own characteristic features. In the flat plains of northern Estonia and Saaremaa are seen the oldest forms of village where farms are assembled in compact clusters, with denser clusters found to the north west. In hilly country of southern Estonia, a more dispersed type of village was found. In the east, on the coast of Lake Peipus and the eastern part of Setumaa, the classical street type village was predominant, while row type villages can be found all over the country.

== Farm buildings ==
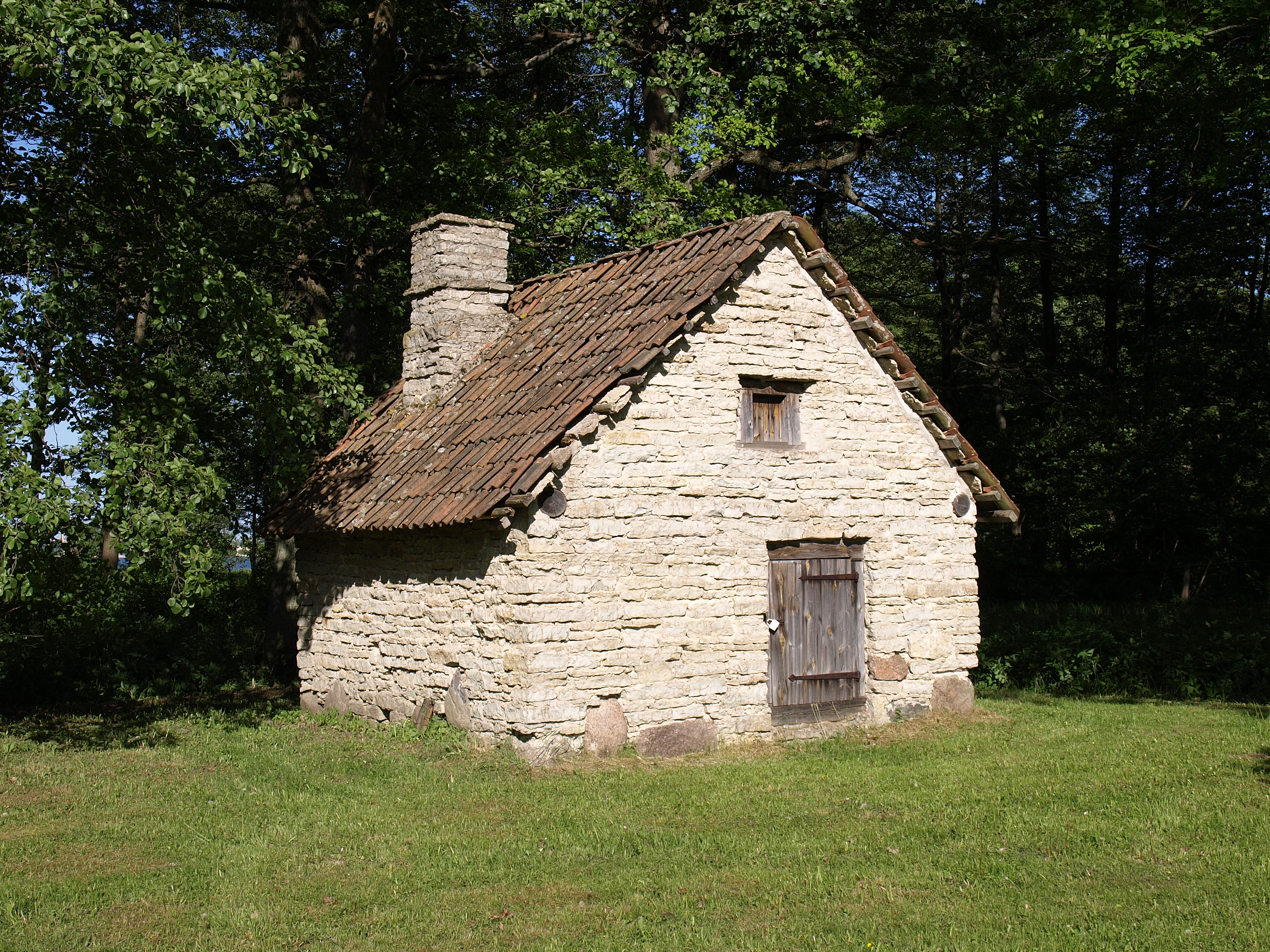
An Estonian Sauna.

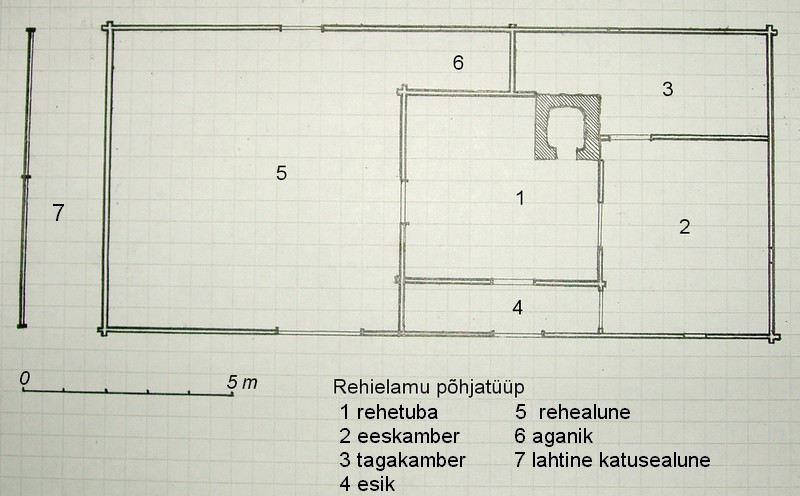
A floorplan on an Estonian rehielamu

The Estonian farmhouse (in Estonian rehielamu) has a unique architectural style that differs fundamentally from similar buildings in neighbouring countries. Its evolution is connected with the Estonian staple black bread and an agrarian tradition dating back some 4000 years, with the threshing barn and dwelling housed under the same roof, thatched with reeds or rye straw.

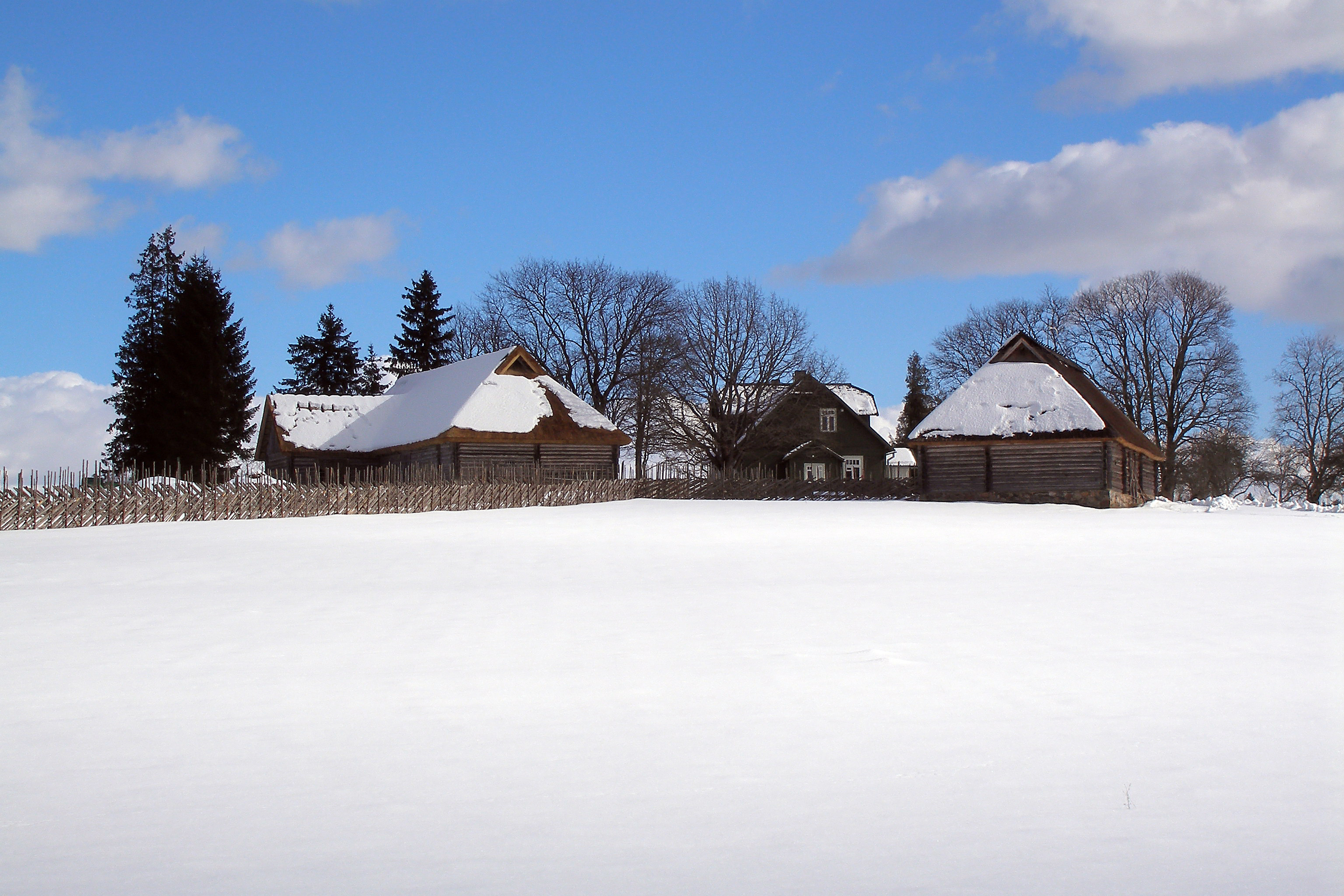
Tammsaare-Põhja farm, birthplace of Estonian writer A. H. Tammsaare.

The form of a traditional 19th century farmhouse is a long chimney-less building with low walls of horizontal logs and a high straw thatched roof. The log walls are one third and the roof two thirds of the total building height. The build has three sections: the threshing floor, the kiln room, and the dwelling chamber, which was used as the primary residence during the winter. The kiln room was the only heated room and all indoor activities were carried out there. During the autumn it was used to dry grain. From summer to autumn cooking was performed in an external summer kitchen and people slept in hay lofts and store rooms.

== See also ==
- Architecture of Estonia
- Estonian Open Air Museum
