= Architecture of Estonia =

This article covers the architecture of Estonia. The nation's architectural heritage is a profound narrative of its history, from medieval Hanseatic structures to its status as a global leader in digital innovation, with its capital, Tallinn, being a UNESCO World Heritage site that now also boasts a thriving scene of contemporary design.

== History ==
=== Ancient Estonia ===
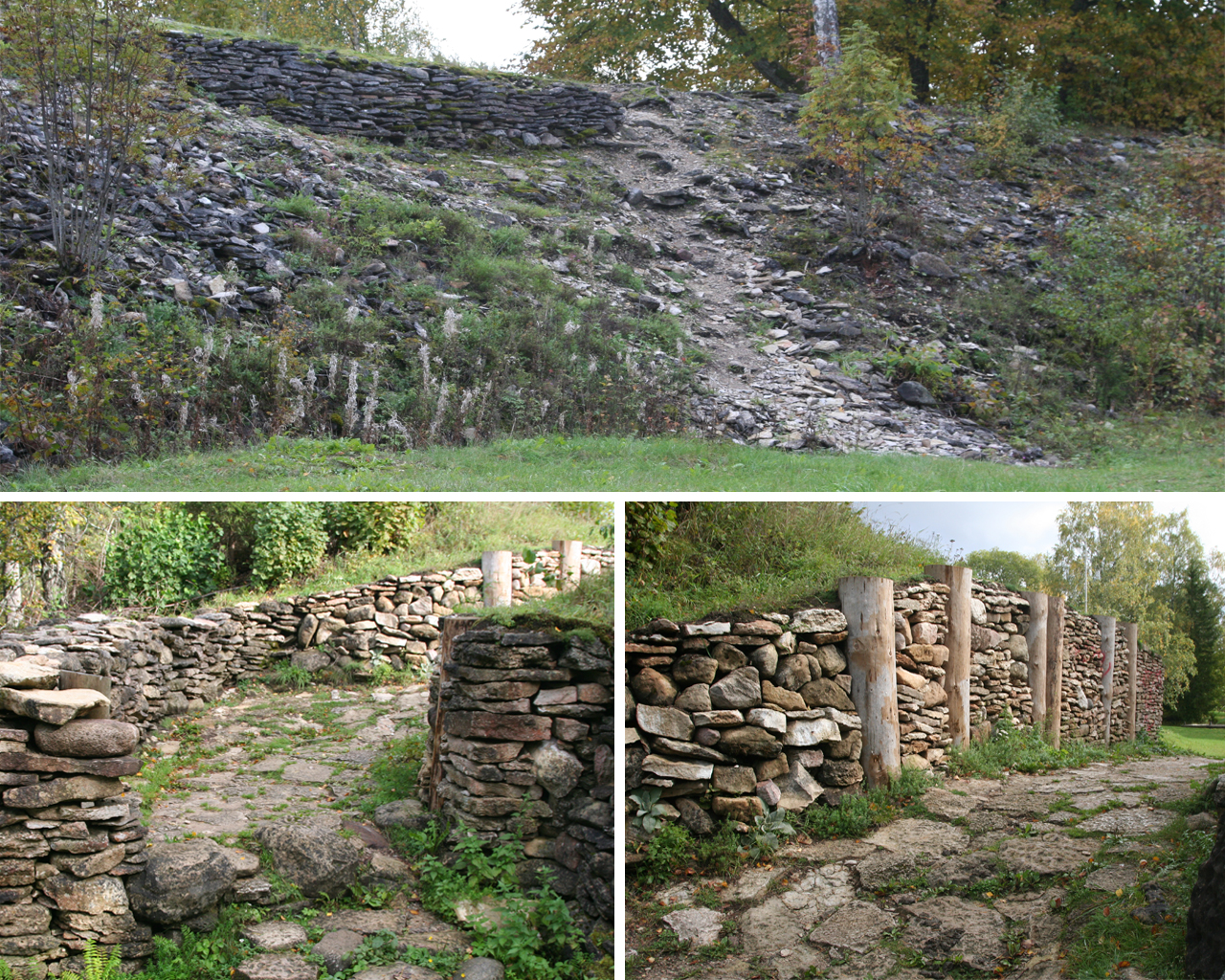
Ruins of the gates to Varbola Stronghold, the largest fortress of pre-Christian Estonia

A distinguishing feature of early Estonian architecture are the many strongholds and hill-forts found throughout the country, for example Varbola and Valjala strongholds. The more important of these, which could cover an area up to 1,000 square metres (11,000 sq ft) and were located at important crossroads, eventually developed into commercial hubs, like Tallinn, Tartu and Otepää.

=== Gothic architecture ===
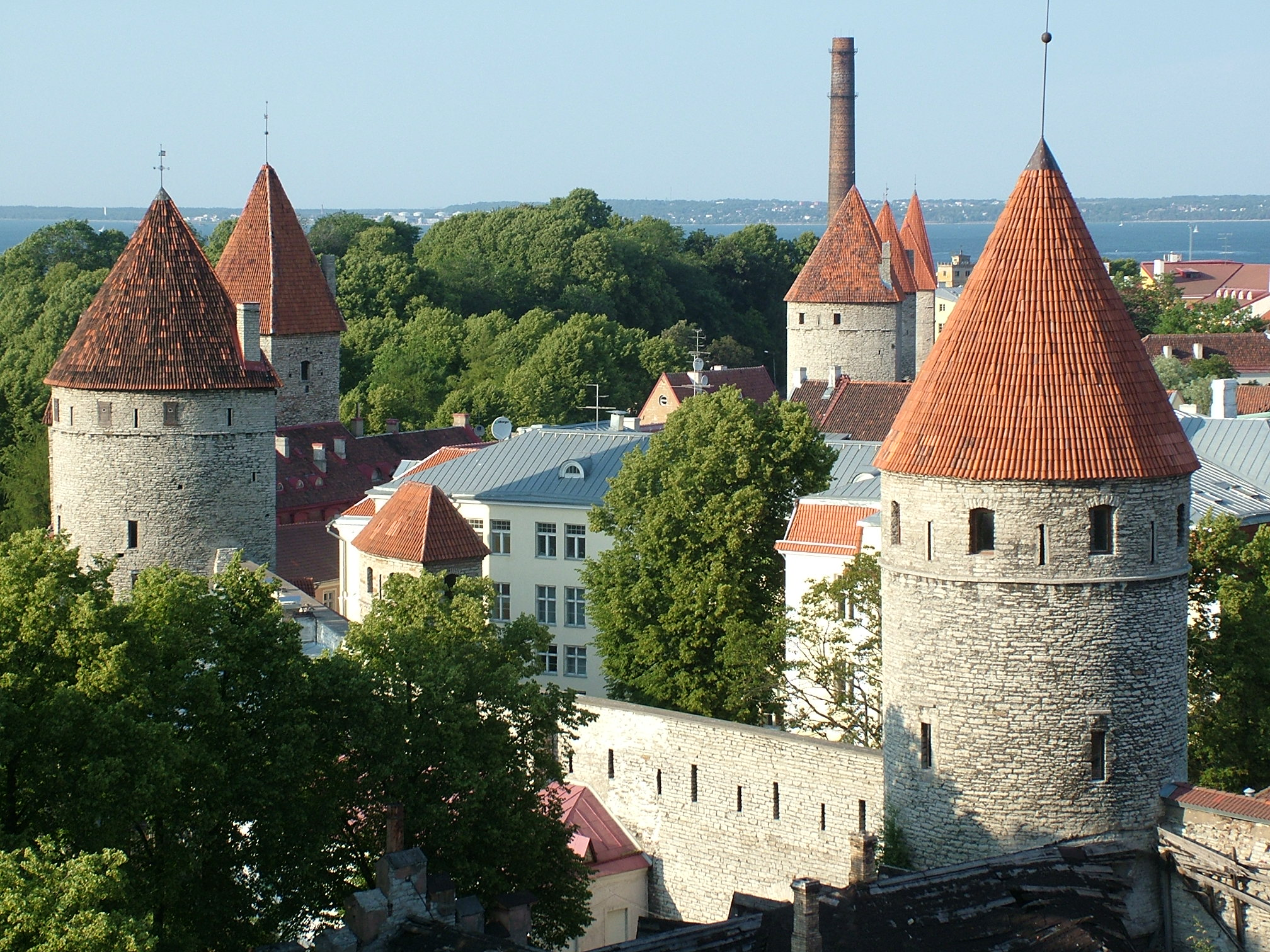
The architectural ensemble that makes out the medieval old town of Tallinn is on the UNESCO World Heritage List

When Catholic Christianity was brought to Estonia during the 13th-century Northern Crusades, it also brought about many changes in the society, including changes in architecture. The influences came mainly from German-speaking areas and Scandinavia. The new religion prompted the erection of churches throughout present-day Estonia, beginning in the 13th century. The first churches were probably wooden; of these none survive. The earliest churches still surviving were strongly built and fortress-like; Valjala church on Saaremaa is one example. The master masons and sculptors who played a significant role in the early church architecture came mainly from Gotland. Later, as Christianity became more firmly rooted, larger and more elaborate churches were built, especially in northern Estonia during the 15th century. The medieval churches in the old town of Tallinn, like the Cathedral, St. Olaf's church (the tallest building in Europe in the 16th century) or the church of the Holy Ghost, still testify to a highly developed Gothic style of architecture. Outside of Tallinn, many churches were damaged during frequent wars, especially the Livonian War and the Great Northern War, and negligence during the Soviet occupation caused much destruction among the churches of Estonia, thus few early churches survive unaltered to this day. In later years however intense restoration work has been carried out, and especially on Saaremaa and in northern Estonia there are still interesting examples of relatively well-preserved medieval churches.

The crusaders also left their mark on the country by erecting a large number of castles as a means to gain military and administrative control over the country. Both large castle complexes, called order castles after the Teutonic and other crusading orders that erected them, and smaller, local fortifications not intended for major military actions (known locally as 'vassal castles') were erected. Good examples of larger castles still extant include Hermann castle in Narva, Toompea castle in Tallinn and Kuressaare castle on Saaremaa. Of smaller castles, Purtse castle, Kiiu tower and Vao tower still exist today. Many of the castles erected during the Middle Ages were destroyed in later wars, and Estonia is abundant in castle ruins.

The expansion and development of Estonian cities like Tallinn and Narva into Hanseatic cities during the Middle Ages also fuelled the development of civic architecture. Burgher's houses with gabled fronts, a large front hall with a fireplace and a smaller living room at the rear became popular; the style became known as 'Tallinn Gothic' and taken up by builders in Finland, Sweden and Novgorod. Other still existing medieval civic buildings testify to the importance of Tallinn as an important trading city; Tallinn Town Hall is today an important historical landmark, as is the Raeapteek (town hall pharmacy) and the buildings of the former guilds in Tallinn, i.e. the Great Guild (1410), St. Olaf's Guild (1422) and the later Brotherhood of Blackheads (c. 1597). The extraordinarily well-preserved city wall of Tallinn is also from this period. All in all, the old town of Tallinn is one of the world's best preserved medieval architectural ensembles, and is listed as one of UNESCO's World Heritage Sites since 1997.

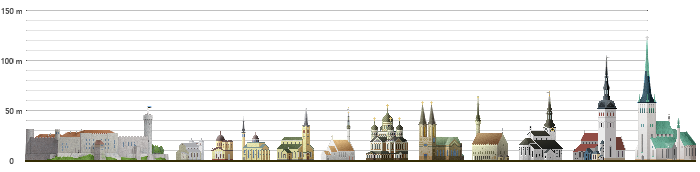

The three tallest structures of Tallinn Old Town to this day are the medieval churches of St. Olaf's Church, St. Nicholas Church, and St. Mary's Cathedral, Tallinn.

=== Baroque and Rococo ===
Baroque and Rococo architecture in Estonia is represented mostly by buildings erected by the Russian imperial administration and the local aristocracy. The finest example still existing is Kadriorg Palace, in Petrine Baroque style. Before World War II, Põltsamaa Castle was an unusually fine example of Rococo architecture in Estonia; the castle was destroyed during the war and only ruins remain.

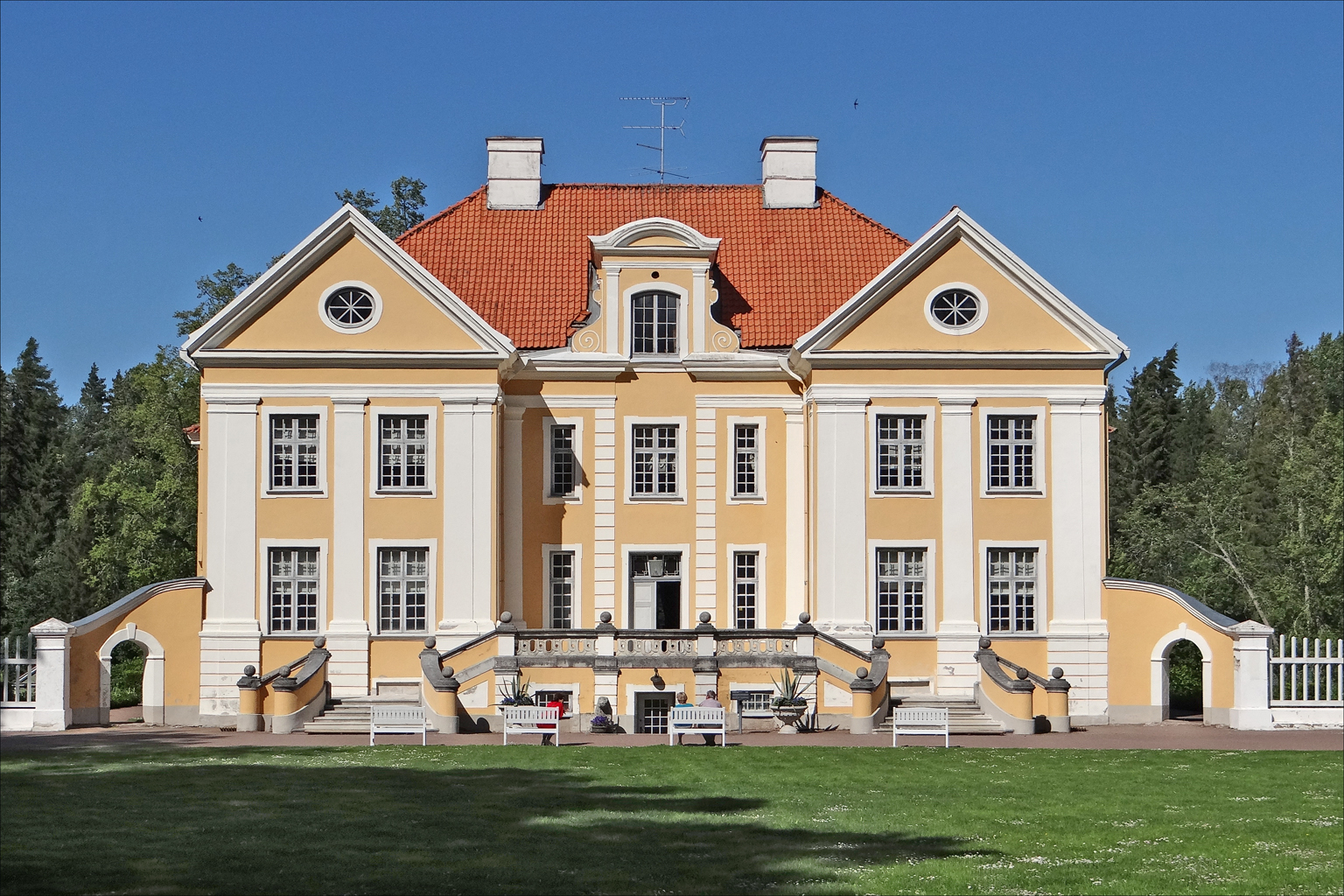
Palmse manor

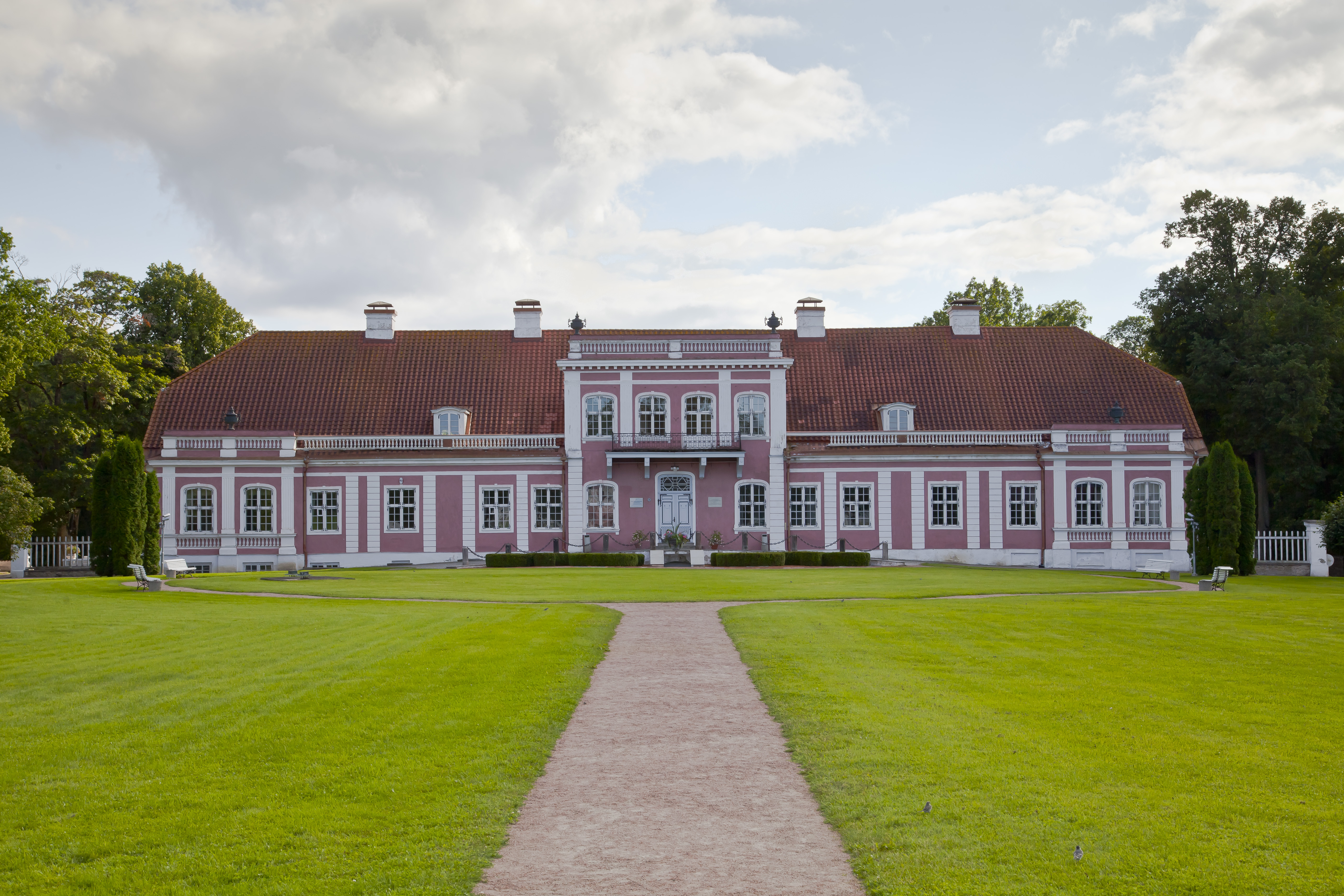
Sagadi manor

Palmse (left) and Sagadi (right) manors are among the most well-known in Estonia

Ever since the Northern crusades and the establishment of the German-speaking Baltic nobility as the landowning class, the countryside of Estonia had been characterised by the manorial system enforced by the upper classes. From the baroque and onwards, many manor houses survive and contribute to the architectural heritage of Estonia. The countryside of Estonia retains around 2000 historic manors, many in the baroque and rococo styles, e.g. Saue, Palmse or Vääna manors, but also representing a range of styles from Neo-Baroque and neo-Classicist to Tudor.

=== Classicism ===
The center of preserved neo-Classicist architecture is Tartu, the Town Hall and surrounding buildings from the 18th century. The main building of the University of Tartu (1803–09) is an example of High Classicism. Manor house architecture continue to dominate the countryside, with manors such as Saku, Kuremaa and Suure-Kõpu exemplifying the style. Some notable residences were also built in Tallinn, e.g. Stenbock House and the building on Kohtu street 8 (architect Carl Ludvig Engel, today housing the Estonian Chancellor of Justice), both on Toompea hill.

=== Late-19th-century architecture ===
As in the rest of Europe, the late 19th century was a time of architectural experimentation of styles in Estonia. Different types of historicism and eclecticism became common. Neo-Gothic became a popular style, not least among manor houses, as can be seen in Alatskivi or Sangaste manors.

At the end of the period, Art Nouveau influences reached Estonia. Major sources of inspiration came were partly the vibrant Art Nouveau scene in Riga and partly Finnish national romanticism. Perhaps the best-known architect who worked in Art Nouveau style in Estonia was Jacques Rosenbaum.

The Alexander Nevsky Cathedral in Tallinn is an example of Russian Revival style from the 19th century when Estonia was a governorate of the Russian Empire.

=== 20th century ===
Sillamäe city centre in its entirety is a noteworthy example of Stalinist architecture in Estonia.

=== Gallery ===
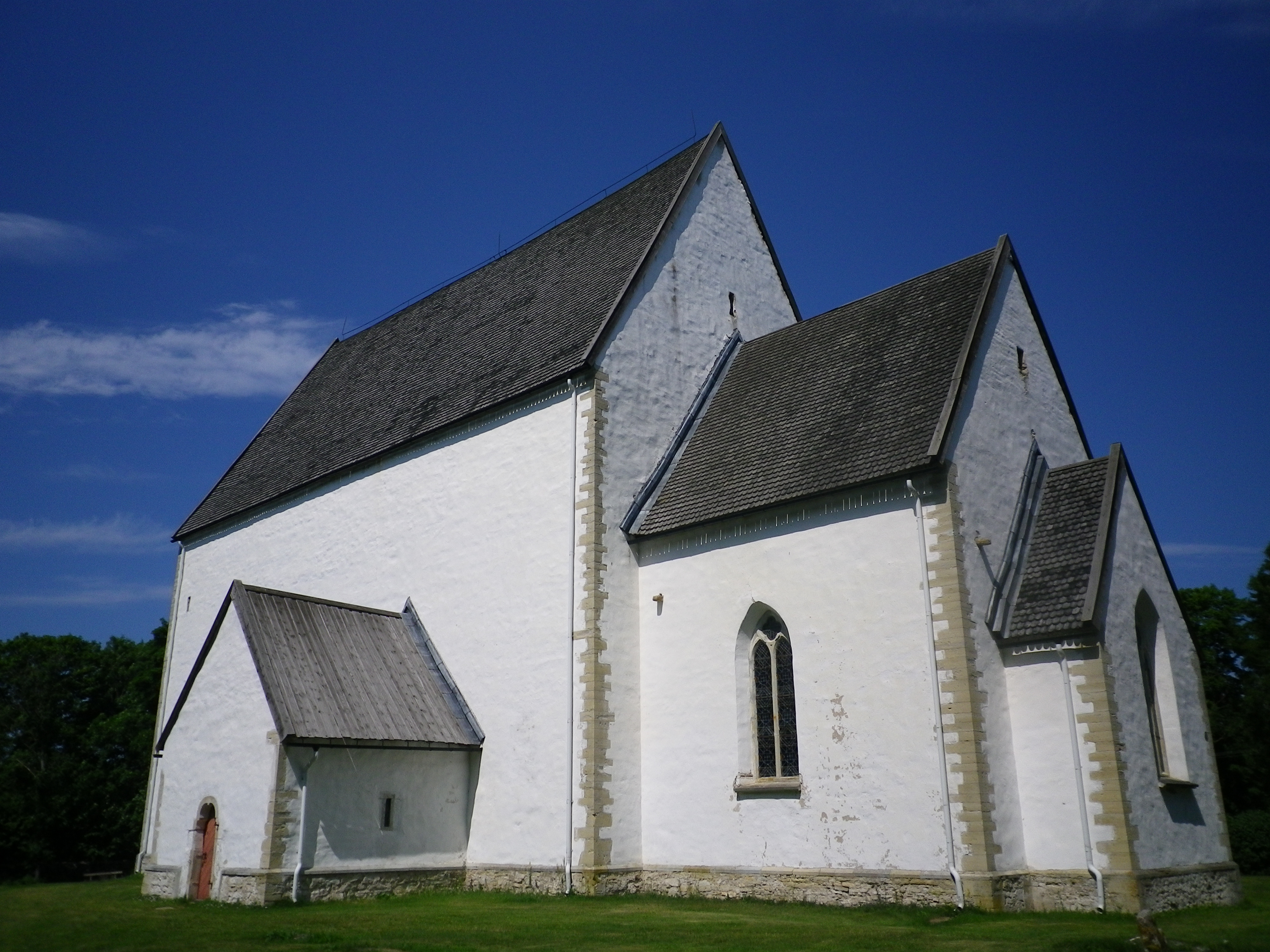
Muhu St. Catherine's Church (13th century)

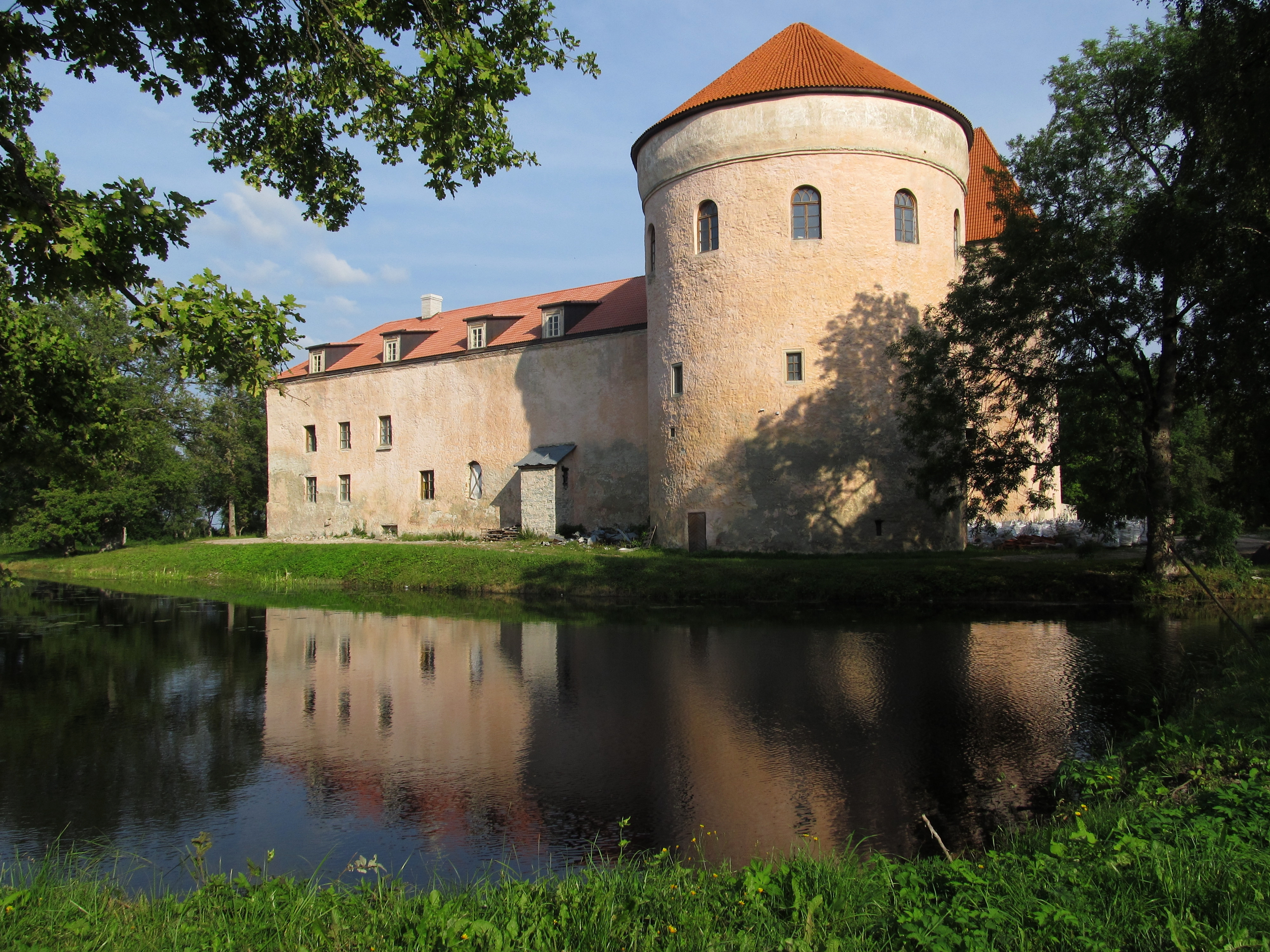
Koluvere Castle (begun 13th century)

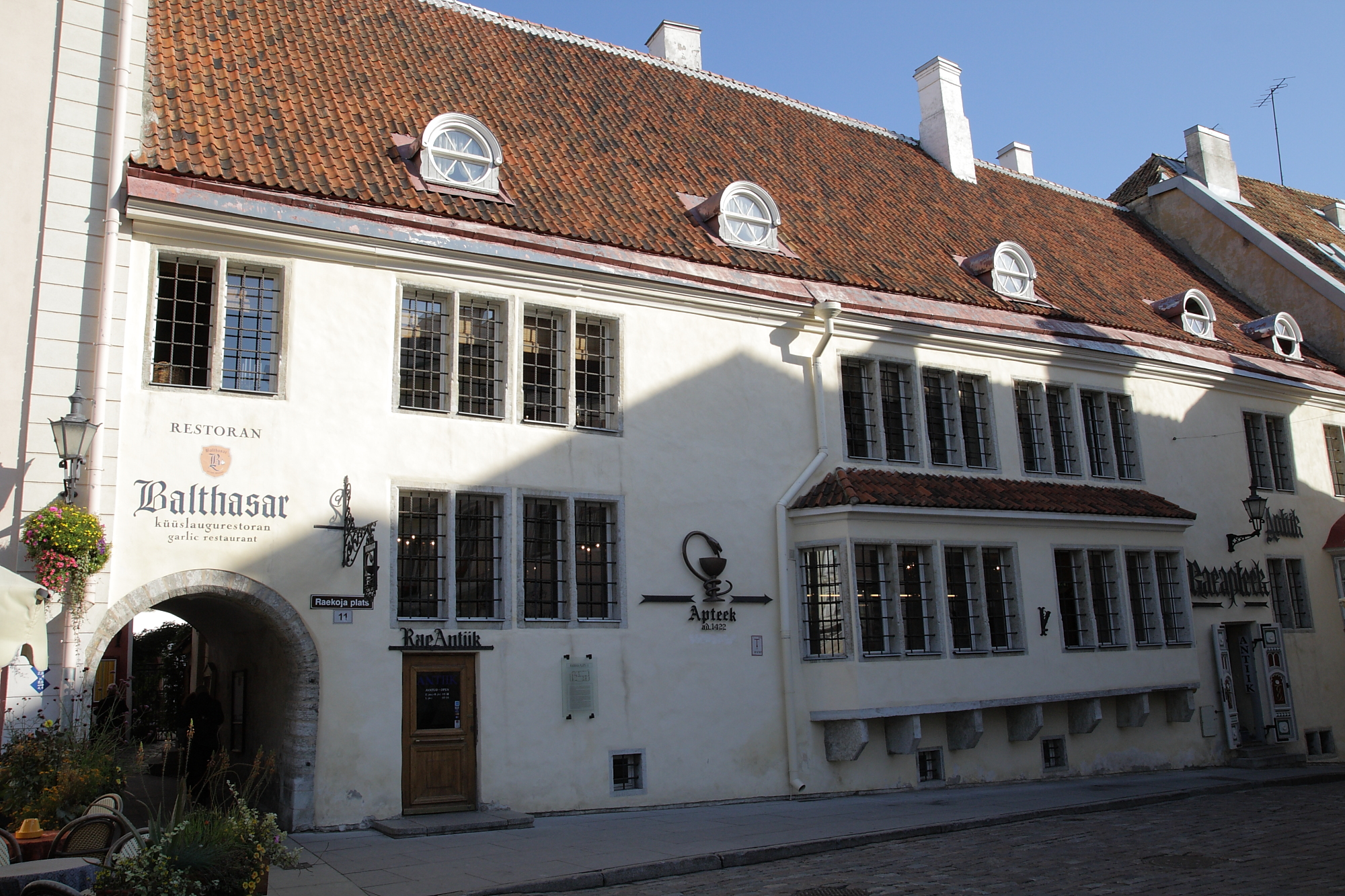
Raeapteek (early 15th century)

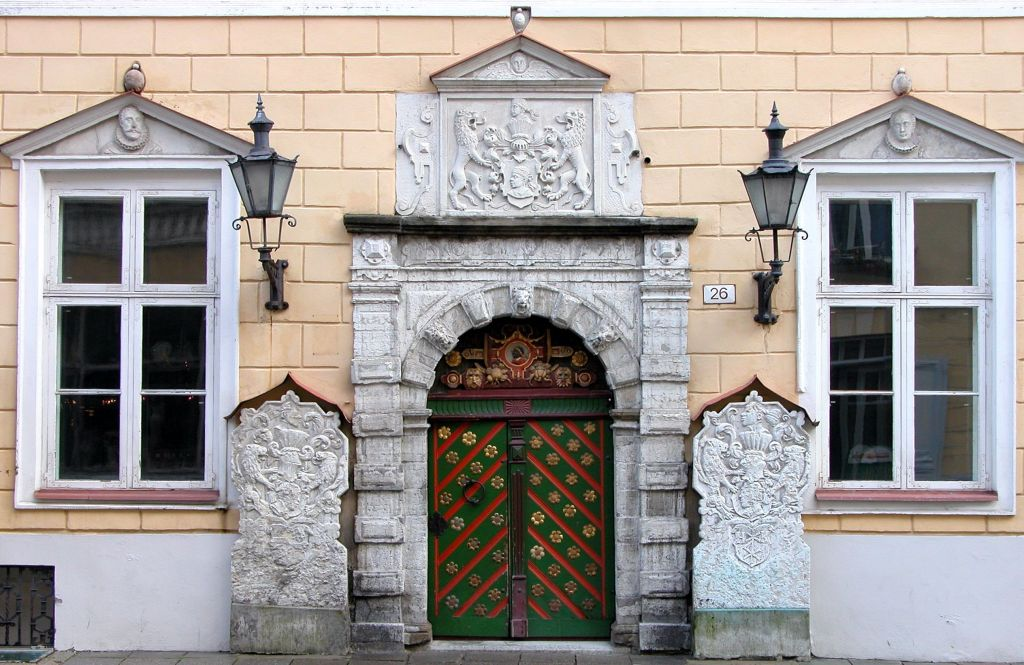
House of the Blackheads, Tallinn (façade by Arent Passer) (1597)

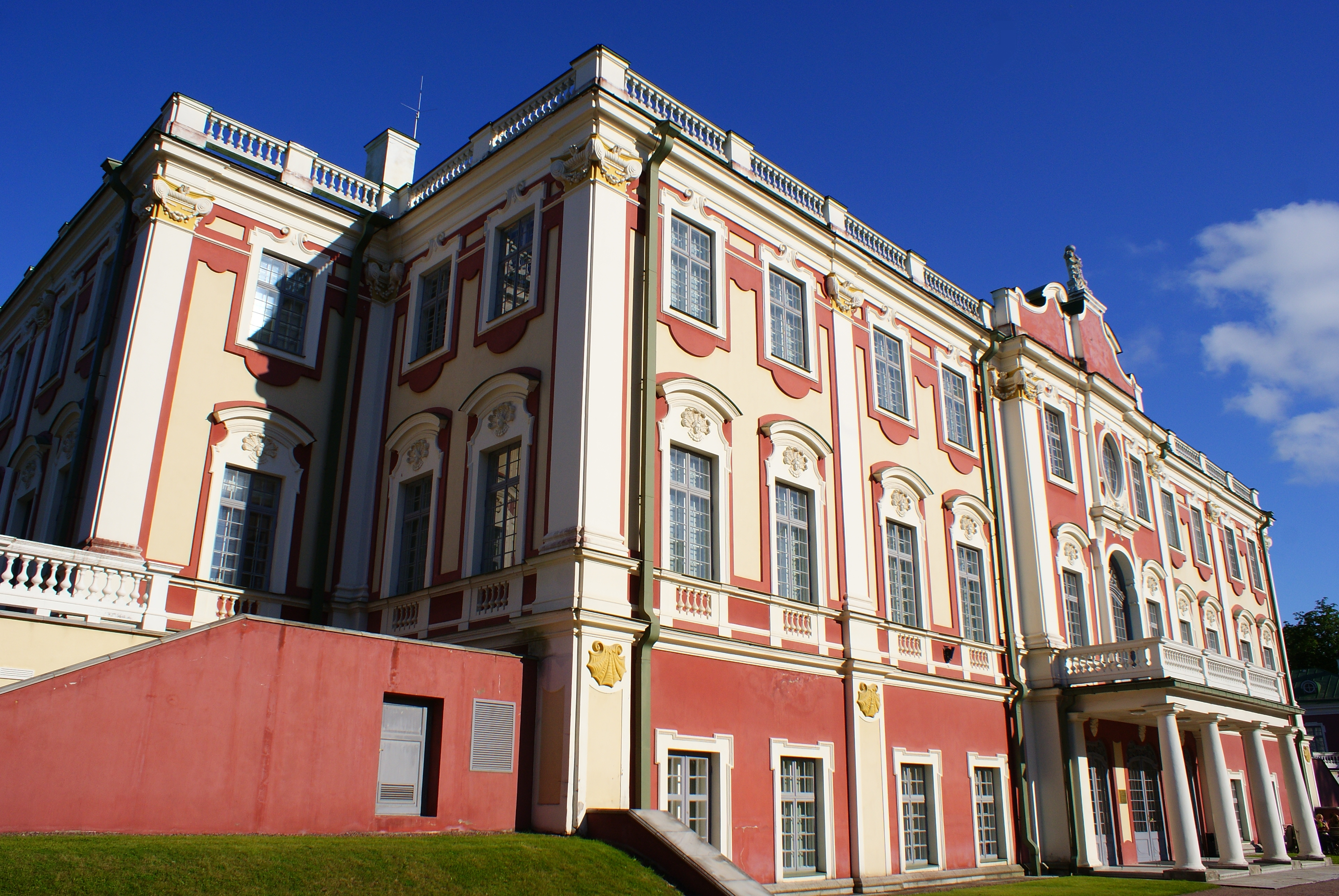
Kadriorg Palace (architects Nicola Michetti, Gaetano Chiaveri and Mikhail Zemtsov) (begun 1718)

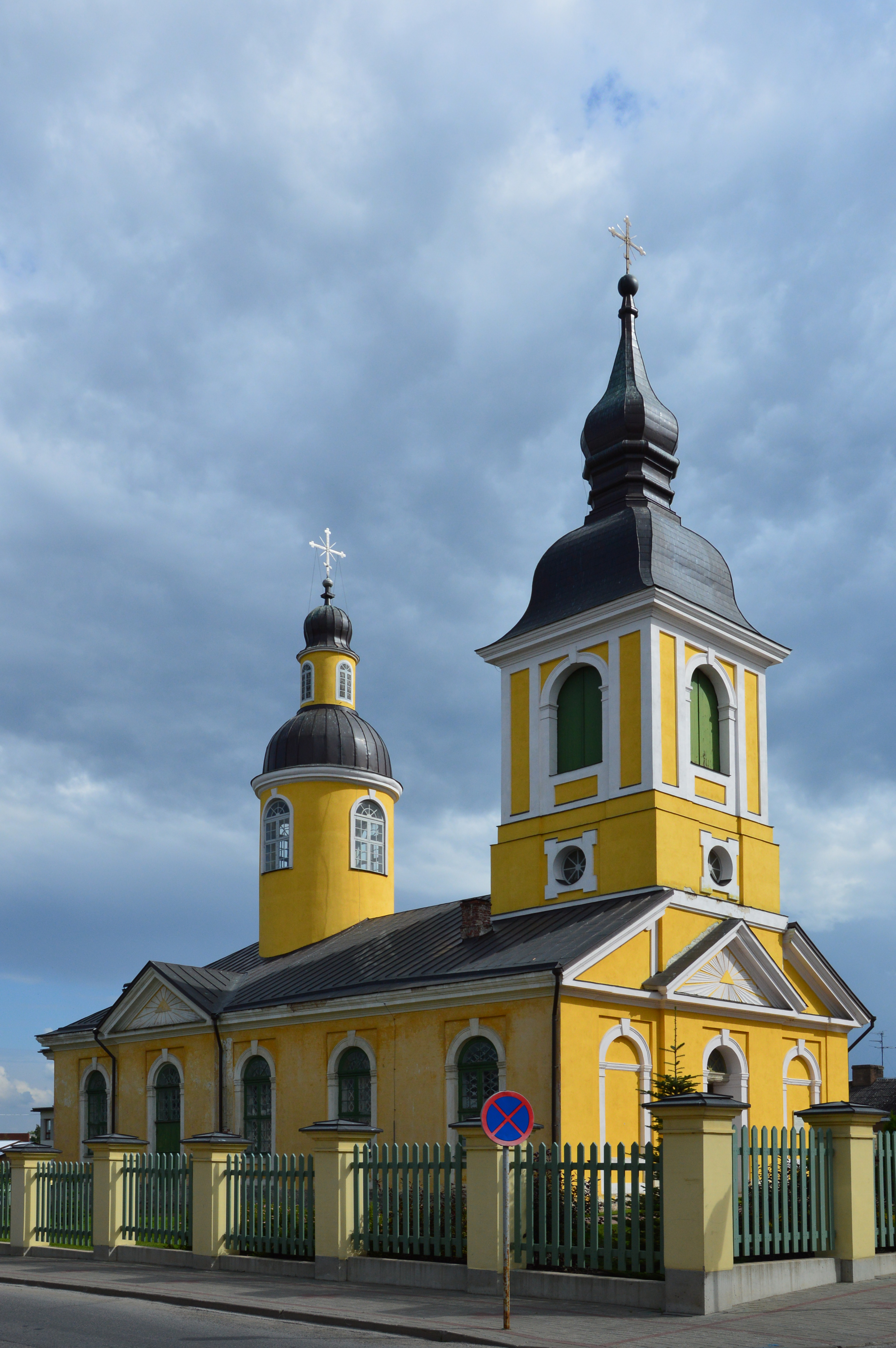
Võru St. Catherine's Orthodox Church is an early example of classicism (1804)

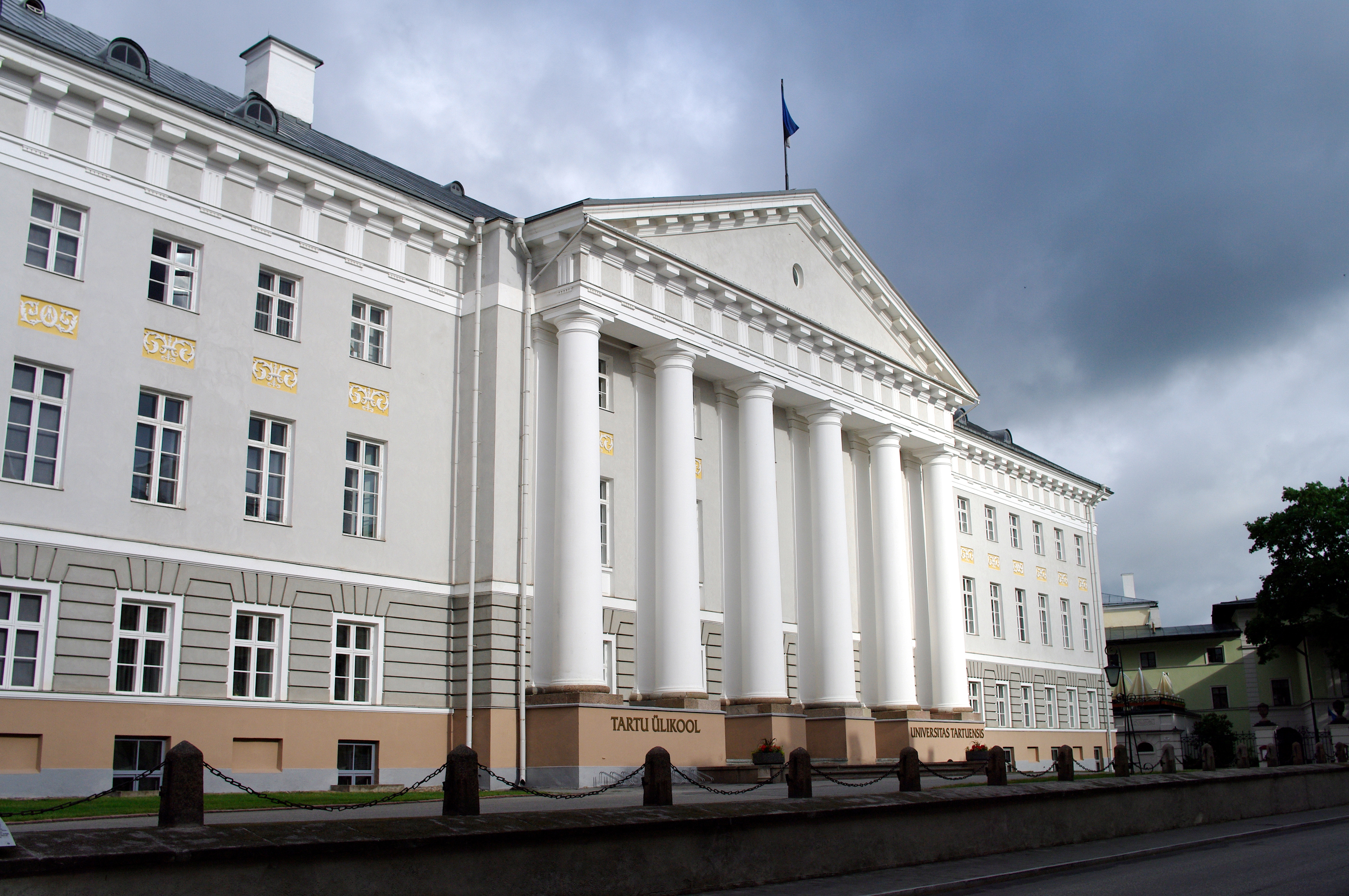
University of Tartu main building (architect Johann Wilhelm Krause, 1803–1809)

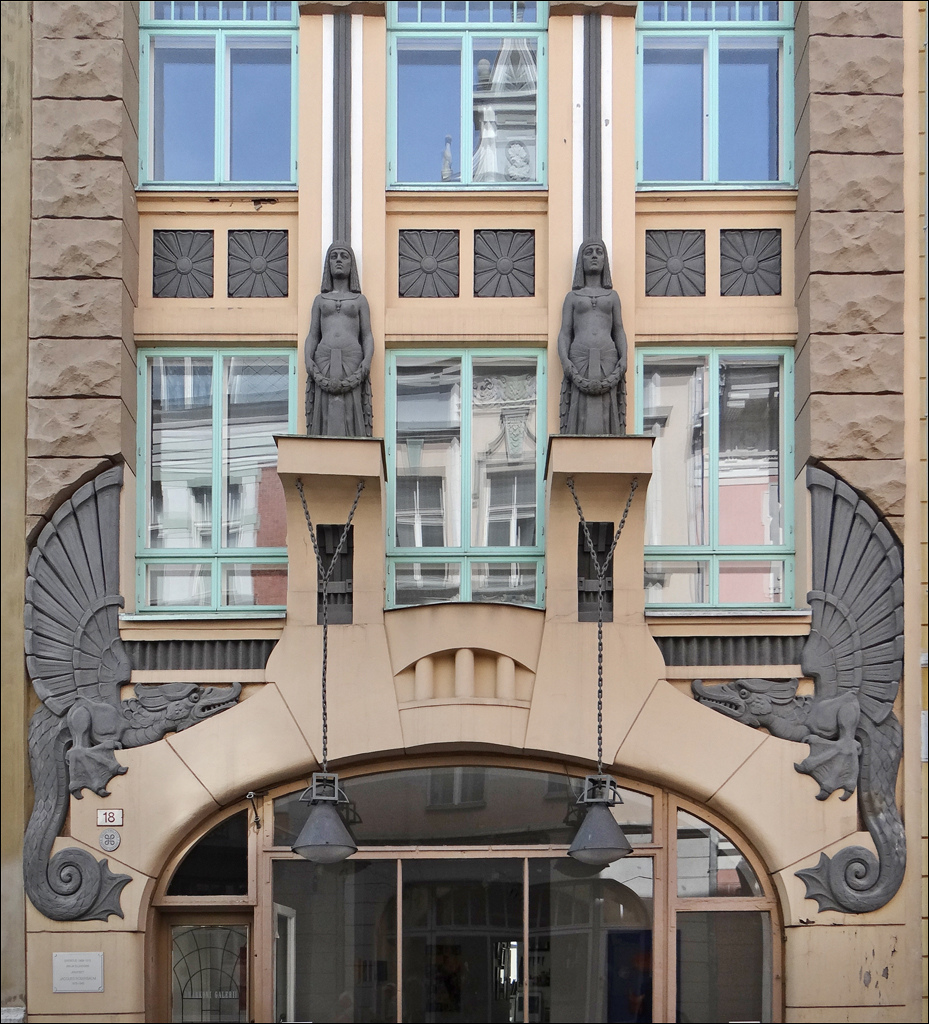
Art Nouveau building in Tallinn (architect Jacques Rosenbaum, completed 1910)

== Contemporary architecture ==
City Plaza Tallinn

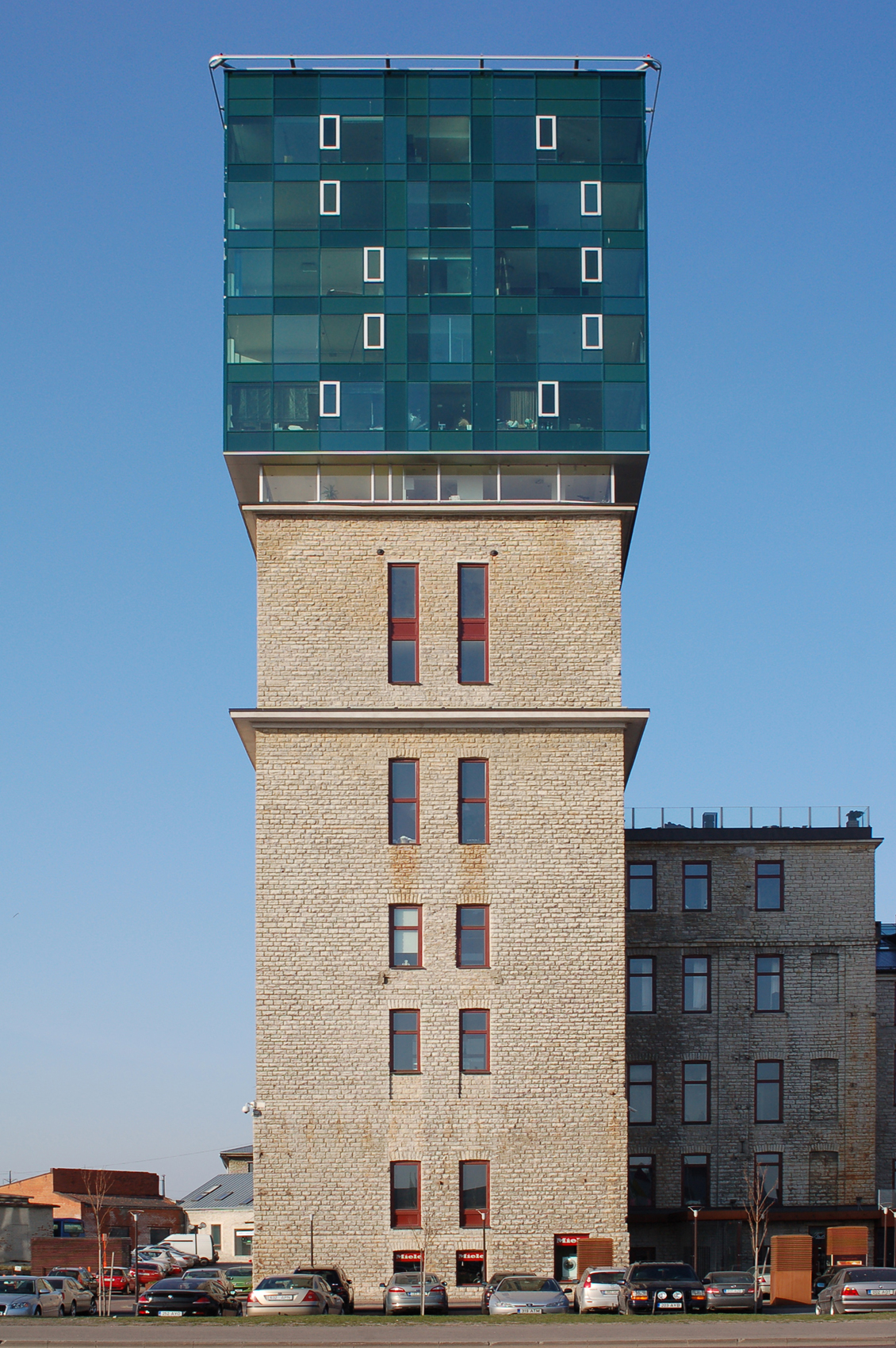
Fahle building in Tallinn

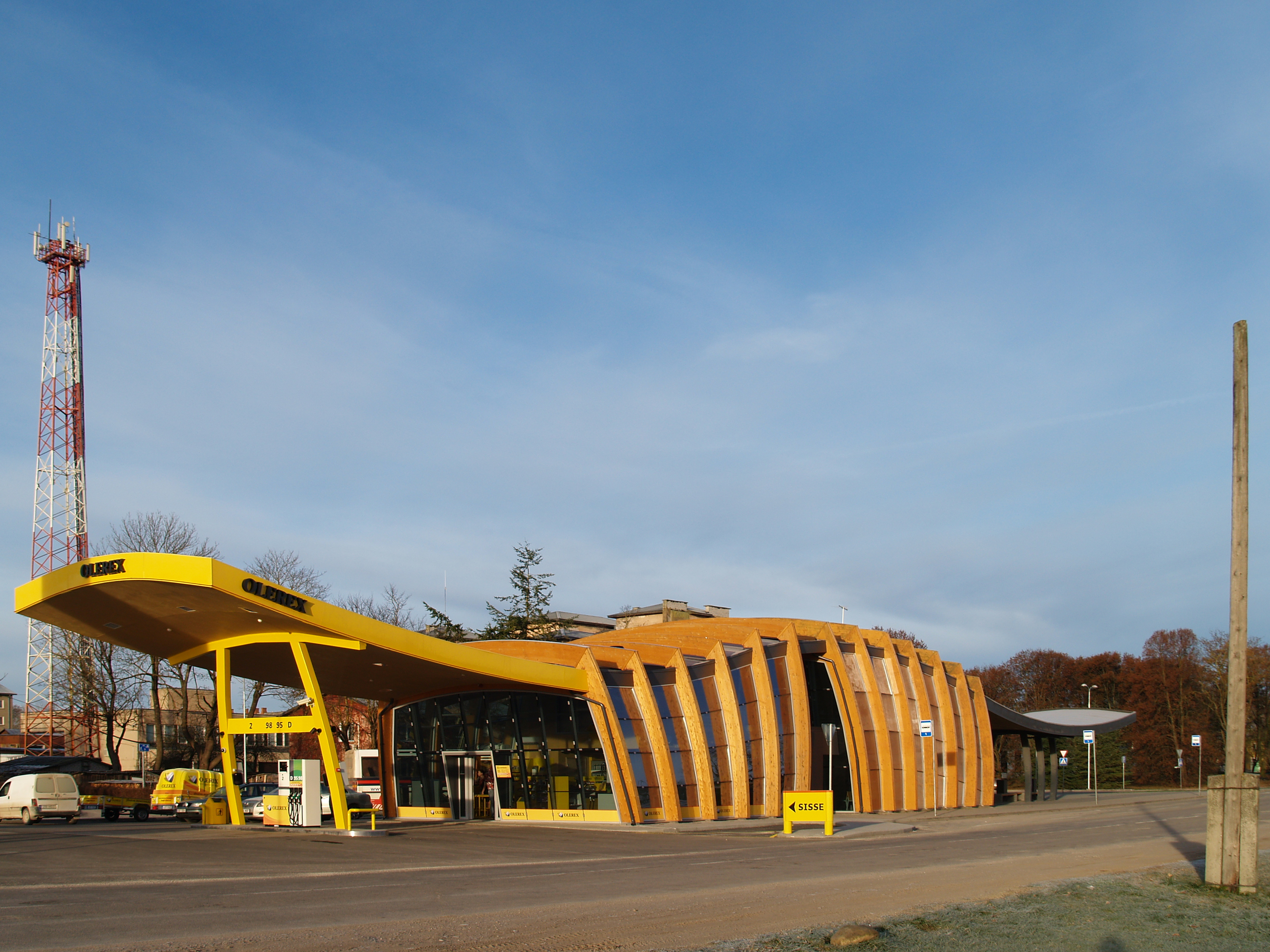
Jõgeva bus station

== See also ==
- Estonian Museum of Architecture
- Estonian vernacular architecture
- List of castles in Estonia
- List of palaces and manor houses in Estonia
- List of tallest buildings in Estonia
