= August Volz =

German sculptor (1851–1926)

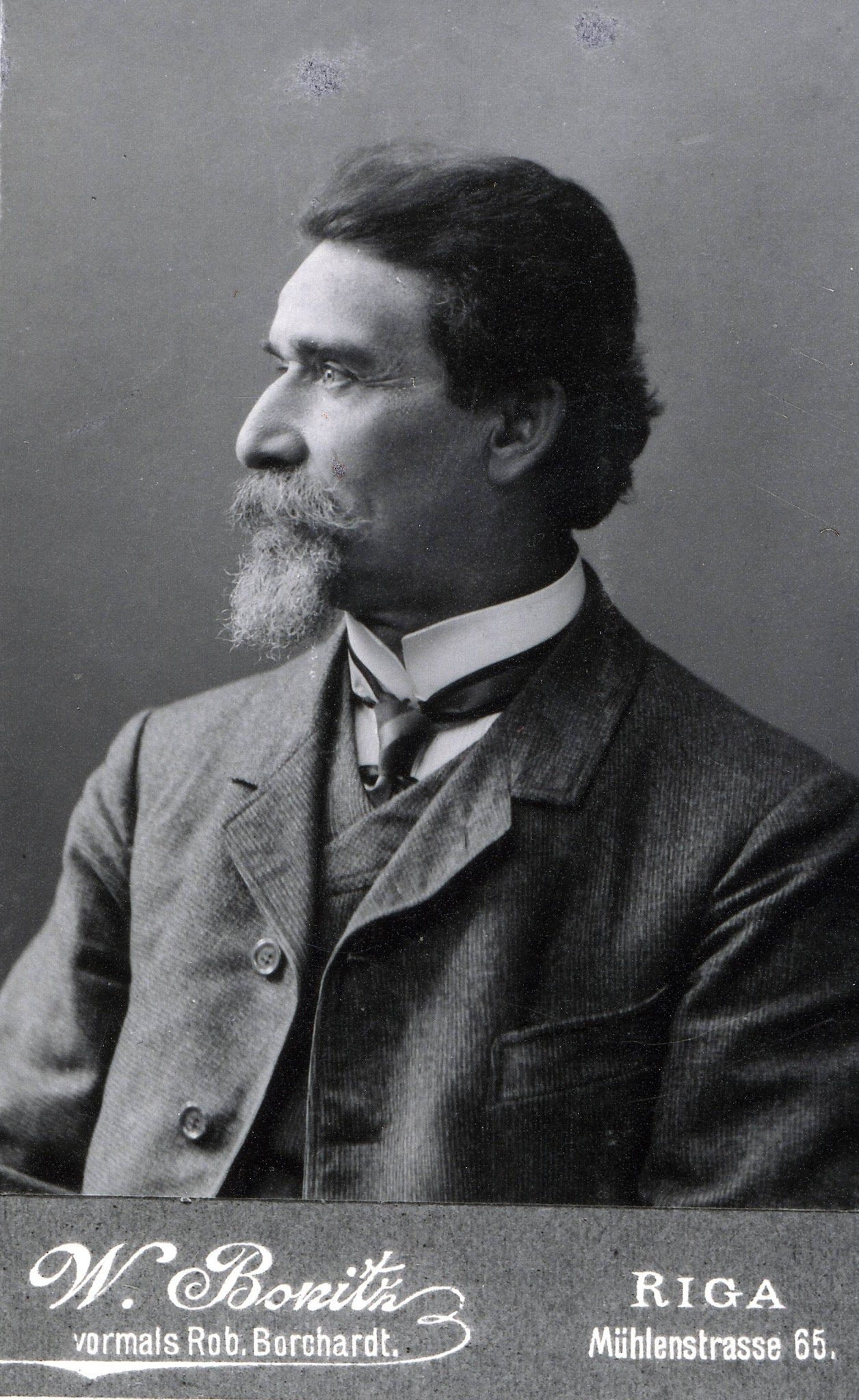
- Volz in early 1900s
- Born: August Franz Leberecht Volz; 27 February 1851; Magdeburg, Kingdom of Prussia, German Confederation
- Died: 20 June 1926 (aged 75); Riga, Latvia
- Known for: Sculpting

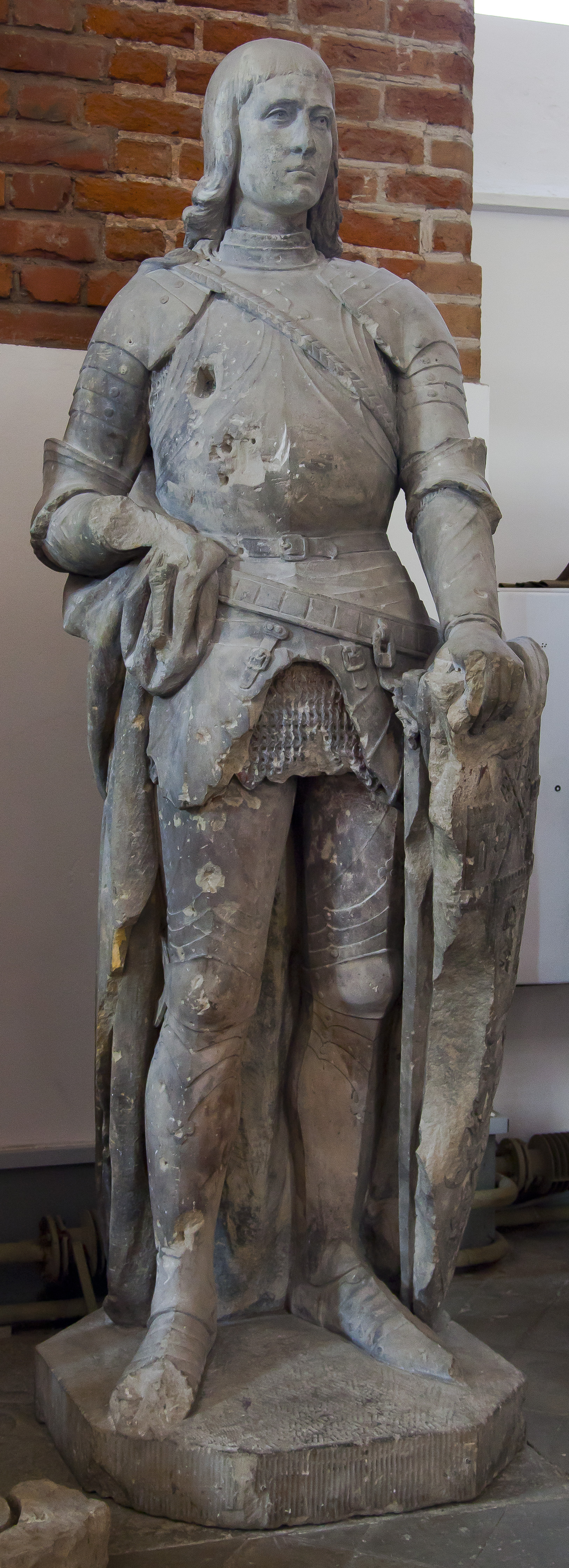
The original statue of Roland by Volz (damaged during World War II). A copy stands on the square outside the House of the Blackheads.

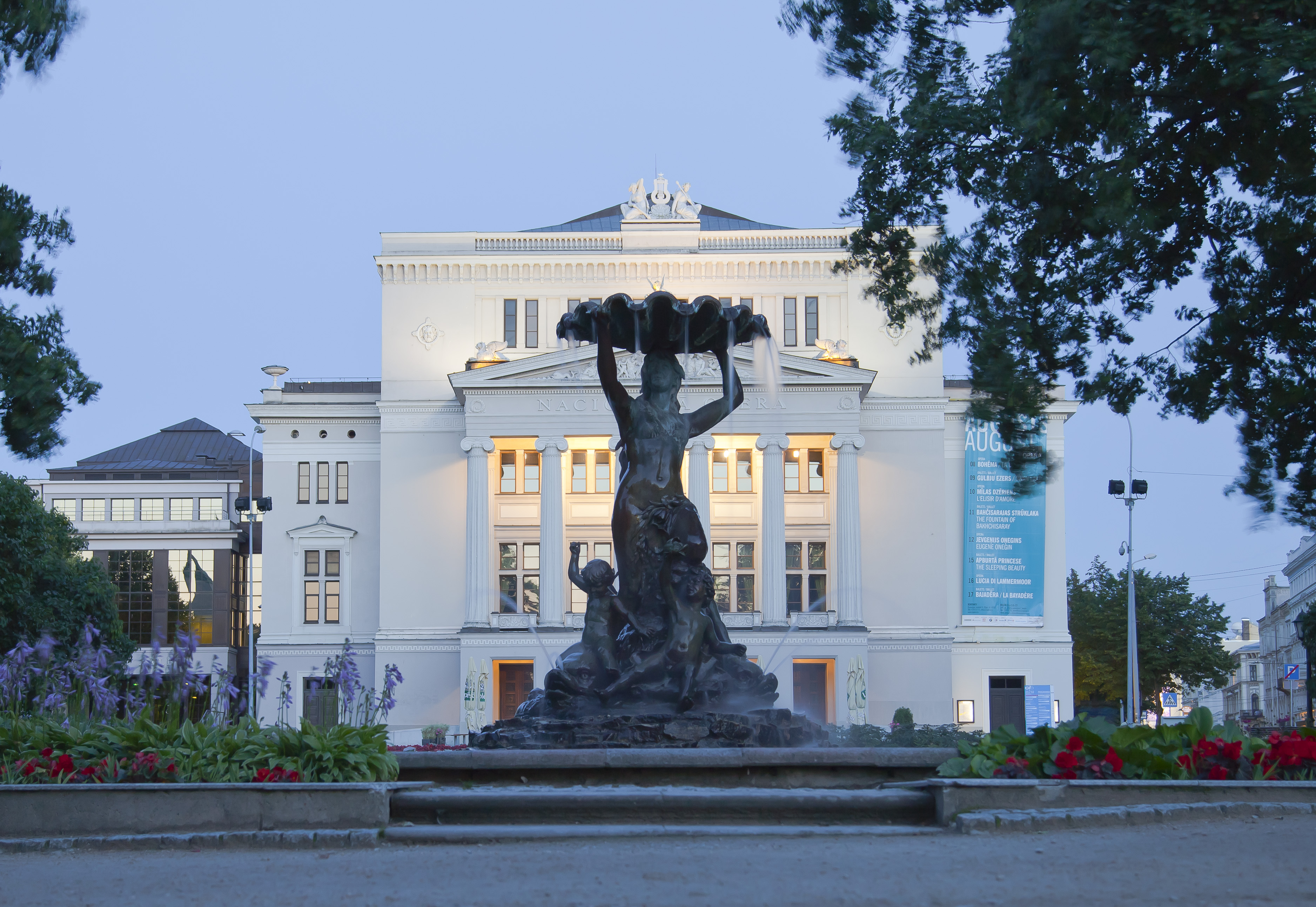
The fountain in front of the Latvian National Opera. Volz designed both the fountain and the interiors of the opera house.

August Franz Leberecht Volz (Latvian: Augusts Francs Folcs; 27 February 1851 – 20 June 1926) was a German sculptor. Born in Magdeburg, Volz worked mainly in Riga, the present-day capital of Latvia. The workshop of Volz received prestigious commissions in Riga from its opening in 1876 and created several of the most well-known sculptures of the city, for example the Roland statue and sculptures decorating the House of the Blackheads. The firm of Volz was also responsible for the complete or partial decoration of a number of important public buildings in the city.

== Biography ==
August Franz Leberecht Volz was born as the eleventh child of shoemaker Johann Volz and his wife Johanne, née Morin, in Magdeburg. He received his basic education in the city and began an apprenticeship at a sculptor's workshop in Magdeburg at the age of 1865. In the spring of 1869 he moved to Berlin, where he initially worked in a sculptor's workshop and from autumn studied sculpting at the Prussian Academy of Arts under the tutelage of Eduard Holbein, Carl Domschke, Friedrich Eggers and Karl Geppert. In 1870, at the outbreak of the Franco-Prussian War, Volz tried to join the military but was refused, the first time because he was underage and the second time because there were already too many volunteers.

Throughout his studies, Volz had been working at different workshops. In October 1871, Volz ceased his studies at the academy and began to work full-time for the firm Ende & Böckmann. The firm also took on commissions abroad, and it was through Ende & Böckmann that Volz came to Riga in the autumn of 1875 to work on the sculptural decoration of a large tenement house (on the present-day address Krišjāņa Barona iela 12). Already on 2 January 1876 he established his own firm in Riga. Riga had at that time a large Baltic German population. In addition to his own work as a sculptor, Volz taught at the Art Academy of Riga after its establishment in 1906.

Volz married his first wife Maria, née Thurm, in 1876. The couple had seven children, of which two died before World War I. Maria died in 1909 and in 1911 Volz married his second wife, Olga, née Kalning. The couple had one son.

Volz spent the rest of his life in Riga apart from the years of World War I, when he and his family were obliged to go into exile in the small town of Tsivilsk. This was because Volz had retained his German citizenship and the Russian Empire and Germany were at war. In Tsivilsk the family rented a room from the town's notary and were treated civilly by the authorities. His home in Riga, meanwhile, was used by both Russian officers and later Germans but kept intact and after his return in 1917 only his collection of hunting rifles were missing.

Volz died in Riga in 1926. His descendants live in Germany. A memorial plaque was put up in 1996 at the site where Volz' workshop was located for many years on the present-day address Krišjāņa Valdemāra iela 31.

== Workshop and firm ==
Volz established himself in Riga at a time of great economic expansion of the old Hanseatic town, which was a major port of the Russian Empire. During the years around the turn of the 19th–20th centuries Riga experienced an unprecedented building activity. At the same time, a professional cadre of local sculptors had not yet formed. Volz' workshop could therefore operate without serious competition, and developed into a large and profitable enterprise. The firm eventually grew to employ about 130 people in the time around 1910, and had already in 1890 employed 40 people. Following the death of August Volz in 1926, his widow Olga continued operating the firm with great skill and energy. On the eve of World War II, because the Volz family was to be forcibly "repatriated" to Germany following the Molotov–Ribbentrop Pact, the firm was sold to the stone-carving firm of Oto Dambekalns.

=== Style and scope ===
Stylistically, August Volz had been trained in the classical tradition of the Academic art. Although his firm took on commissions ranging from simple structural elements such as stairs and columns to facades and interiors, portraits, memorial plaques and reliefs, Volz' arguably finest works were freestanding sculpture in the round in the form of free-standing monuments or architectural decoration. A question of dispute is how much the workshop of Volz contributed to providing sculptural elements for the extraordinary flowering of Art Nouveau architecture in Riga. Archival documentation is lacking, and while several sculptures e.g. on the expressive buildings on Alberta iela display characteristics which could certainly link them to the workshop of Volz, it is also known that August Volz himself was dismissive of Art Nouveau as a style. It is however known that Volz supplied the sculptural elements of the highly Art Nouveau buildings by Jacques Rosenbaum in neighbouring Tallinn, and for at least some Art Nouveau buildings in Riga.

== Works ==
=== Public buildings ===
One of the first prestigious commissions given to Volz was the decoration of the Nativity Cathedral, designed by architect Robert Pflug in a Byzantine Revival style and built in 1876–1884; it is the largest Russian Orthodox Church in the Baltic states. Volz' company subsequently participated in the decoration of an additional two churches in Riga.

One of Riga's most iconic buildings, the House of the Blackheads, underwent a significant alteration to designs by architect Heinrich Scheel in 1886 and Volz was responsible for the extensive sculptural decoration. The facade had already in the 17th century been decorated with four trompe-l'œil paintings depicting four allegorical figures, and Volz thus created four sculptures representing the same deities: Hermes, Poseidon, Peace and Harmony, which each stand in a niche prominently displayed at the centre of the facade. Volz would continue to create sculptures for the House of the Blackheads but it remains unclear exactly which sculptures were made in his workshop; it has been assumed that the Saint George and the Dragon on the corner of the building as well as the two lions at the entrance are from the workshop of Volz.

Volz' firm also took active part in supplying decorations for both the present-day Latvian National Opera and the Latvian National Theatre. The entirety of the interior decoration for the opera was entrusted to Volz, while for the theatre the firm of Volz supplied the Atlas figures flanking the entrance while the interior decoration was entrusted to the firm Otto & Wassil.

Volz workshop also supplied the sculpture group adorning the pediment of the present-day Latvian National Museum of Art in 1903. It depicts the Greek goddess Athena surrounded by allegorical figures representing civic and artistic traits. The present-day Art Academy of Latvia (built as a commercial school) also has capitals designed by Volz in a Neo-Gothic style, as well as reliefs and other forms of sculptural decoration.

Volz' workshop also provided sculptures for the building of the present-day Ministry of Foreign Affairs, originally built as a bank. In addition, Volz provided sculptures and decorations for schools, factories, banks and monumental tenement houses in Riga.

=== Monuments ===
Volz made the Roland statue on the Town Hall Square (Rātslaukums) in front of the House of the Blackheads in 1894. The original statue was severely damaged during World War II and later moved out during the Soviet occupation of Latvia, it was partially repaired by Estonian sculptor Marija Ehelaide in 1970 and transferred to St. Peter's Church in 1984. A copy of the statue is made by Edvīns Krūmiņš, and placed at the original position in 1999.

In 1888 a fountain designed and executed by Volz' company was placed in front of the Latvian National Opera. It draws on Baroque ideas and represents a nymph surrounded by young boys and dolphins. Like the Roland statue, the fountain was damaged during World War II and restored in 1987 by Mirdza Lukaža.

The workshop of Volz also designed a similar statue of a knight for the Bastejkalns park (destroyed) and sculptures of lions in the Vērmanes Garden.

=== Works outside Riga ===
While Volz' company was mostly active in Riga, the firm did take on some commissions outside the city limits. The company provided decorations and sculptures for no less than nine manor houses in the Latvian countryside; most of these have however been destroyed or damaged during the violent 20th century.

The company also supplied sculptures for some buildings in Tallinn (present-day capital of Estonia), notably buildings by architect Jacques Rosenbaum and reliefs for the Estonian Drama Theatre. The company also provided sculptures for the Hludov baths in Moscow.

At least one other Baltic German sculptor, Karl Hans Bernewitz, was initially taught by Volz.

== Bibliography ==
- Appena, Ināra (2012). Augusts Volz, Sculptor of Riga. Riga: Neputns. ISBN 978-9984-807-86-7.
- Hallas-Murula, Karin (2010). Tallinna Juugendarhitektuur: Jacques Rosenbaum (1878–1944). Eesti Arhitektuurimuuseum. ISBN 978-9985-9828-7-7.
- Krastins, Janis (2014). Art Nouveau buildings in Riga (3rd ed.). Riga: ADD PROJEKTS. ISBN 978-9934-8318-2-9.
