= Karlo (name) =

Karlo is a Croatian, Basque, and Esperanto masculine given name as well as a Slovene masculine given name that serves as a Slovene diminutive form of Karel.

== Given name ==
- Karlo Aspeling (born 1987), South African rugby player
- Karlo Bartolec (born 1995), Croatian football player
- Karlo Bašić (1911–2000), Croatian sailor
- Karlo Bauman (1914–1954), Croatian sailor
- Karlo Belak (born 1991), Croatian football player
- Karlo Bilić (born 1993), Croatian football player
- Karlo Bručić (born 1992), Croatian football player
- Karlo Bulić (1910 - 1986), Croatian actor
- Karlo Butić (born 1998), Croatian football player
- Karlo Calcina (born 1984), Peruvian football player
- Karlo Čović (born 1945), Serbian wrestler
- Karlo Erak (born 1995), Croatian water polo player
- Karlo Filipović (born 1954), Bosnia and Herzegovina politician
- Karlo Hmeljak (born 1983), Slovenian sailor and poet
- Karlo Kacharava (1964–1994), Georgian artist
- Karlo Kamenar (born 1994), Croatian football player
- Karlo Kešinović (born 1989), Croatian footballer
- Karlo Kreković (born 1999), Croatian water polo player
- Karlo Kuret (born 1970), Croatian sailor
- Karlo Lanza (1778 – 1834), Dalmatian politician
- Karlo Letica (born 1997), Croatian football player
- Karlo Lukanov (1897 – 1982), Bulgarian politician
- Karlo Lulić (born 1996), Croatian football player
- Karlo Lusavec (born 2003), Croatian footballer
- Karlo Majić (born 1998), Croatian footballer
- Karlo Maquinto (1990 - 2012), Filipino boxer
- Karlo Matković (born 2001), Croatian basketball player
- Karlo Metikoš (1940–1991), Croatian musician, husband of Josipa Lisac
- Karlo Mijić (1887–1964), Yugoslav painter
- Karlo Mila (born 1974), New Zealand poet
- Karlo Miljanić (born 2002), Croatian footballer
- Karlo Muhar (born 1996), Croatian footballer
- Karlo Muradori (1914–1971), Croatian football player
- Karlo Nograles (born 1976), Filipino politician
- Karlo Pavlenć (1926 – 1987), Croatian rower
- Karlo Plantak (born 1997), Croatian footballer
- Karlo Požgajčić (born 1982), Croatian figure skater
- Karlo Primorac (born 1984), Croatian football player
- Karlo Ressler (born 1989), Croatian politician
- Karlo Sakandelidze (1928 – 2010), Georgian actor
- Karlo Sentić (born 2001), Croatian footballer
- Karlo Šimek (born 1988), Croatian football player
- Karlo Štajner (1902 – 1992), Austrian activist and Gulag survivor
- Karlo Stipanić (born 1941), Croatian water polo player
- Karlo Težak (born 1993), Croatian football player
- Karlo Toth (1907 – 1988), Yugoslav wrestler
- Karlo Uljarević (born 1998), Croatian basketball player
- Karlo Umek (1917 – 2010), Slovenian sports shooter
- Karlo Vragović (born 1989), Croatian basketball
- Karlo Weissmann (1890 – 1953), Croatian physician
- Karlo Žganec (born 1995), Croatian basketball player
- Karlo Žiger (born 2001), Croatian footballer

== Surname ==
- Tomislav Karlo (born 1970), Croatian swimmer

== Middle name ==
- Antun Karlo Bakotić (1831 – 1887), Croatian writer and physicist
- Jovan Karlo Villalba (born 1977), American artist

== Fictional character ==
- Basil Karlo original version of Clayface, DC Comics character originating from Detective Comics, American book series
- Karlo David, a character from ABS-CBN's 2010-2011 drama series Mara Clara

== See also ==
- Karlo (disambiguation)
- Carlo (name)
- Kahlo (surname)
- Karl
- Karla (name)
- Karle (name)
- Karli (name)
- Karly
- Karlos (name)
- Karlov (surname)
- Karlow (name)
- Karo (name)
- Karol (name)
- Karoo (disambiguation)
- Kaslo (disambiguation)
