= Karlov =

Karlov or Karlova (the feminine or possessive form) may refer to:

== Places ==
=== Czech Republic ===
- Karlov (Žďár nad Sázavou District), a village and municipality in Vysočina Region
- Karlova Studánka, a village in Bruntál, Moravian-Silesian Region
- Karlova Ves (Rakovník District), a village and municipality in the Central Bohemian Region
- Karlova Koruna Chateau, in Chlumec nad Cidlinou, Hradec Králové Region
- Velký Karlov, a village and municipality in Znojmo, South Moravian Region
- Univerzita Karlova or Charles University, Prague

=== Other places ===
- Karlova, Tartu, a neighbourhood of Tartu, Estonia
  - Tartu Karlova School, Estonia
- Karlová, a village and municipality in Slovakia
- Karlova Ves, a borough in Bratislava, Slovakia

== Other uses ==
- Karlov (surname)

== See also ==
- Karlos (disambiguation)
