= Karol =

Karol may refer to:

== Places ==
- Karol, Gujarat, a village on Saurashtra peninsula in Gujarat, west India
  - Karol State, a former Rajput petty princely state with seat in the above town
- Karol Bagh, neighbourhood of Central Delhi, Delhi, India
  - Karol Bagh metro station
  - Karol Bagh Assembly constituency
  - Karol Bagh Lok Sabha constituency

== Film/TV ==
- Karol: A Man Who Became Pope, a 2005 miniseries
- Karol: The Pope, The Man, a 2006 miniseries

== Other uses ==
- Karol (name)
- King Karol, a New York City-based record store chain

== See also ==
- Carol (disambiguation)
- Kalol (disambiguation)
- Karoli (disambiguation)
- Karoo (disambiguation)
- Karow (disambiguation)
