= Karlos (name) =

Karlos is a Basque masculine given name. Notable people referred to by this name include the following

== Given name ==
- Karlos Arguiñano (born 1948), Spanish (Basque) chef
- Karlos Balderas, nickname of Carlos Balderas (born 1996), American boxer
- Karlos Dansby (born 1981), American gridiron football player
- Karlos Ferrer (born 1998), Puerto Rican football player
- Karlos Filiga, full name of Karl Filiga (born 1988), New Zealand rugby player
- Karlos Kirby (born 1967), American bobsledder
- Karlos Moser, American music professor
- Karlos Rosé stage name of Carlos de la Rosa, Dominican bachata music performer
- Karlos Vémola (born 1985), Czech mixed martial artist
- Karlos Williams (born 1993), American gridiron football player

== Middle name ==
- Juan Karlos Labajo (born 2001), Filipino musician
- Wesley Karlos Piedade (born 1989), Brazilian football player

== See also ==
- Karlos (disambiguation)
- Carlos (given name)
- Kardos (surname)
- Karlo (name)
- Karlous
- Karlov (surname)
- Karlow (name)
- Karolos
