= Kardos (surname) =

Kardos is a Hungarian language occupational surname, which means "swordsman", derived from the Turkish word "kard", meaning a sword. Alternative spellings include Kardoš, Kardosh, and Kardossh. The name may refer to:

- Dezider Kardoš (1914–1991), Slovak composer
- Ferenc Kardos (1937–1999), Hungarian filmmaker
- Gene Kardos (1899–1980), American musician
- János Kardos (1801–1875), Hungarian writer
- József Kardos (born 1960), Hungarian football player
- Štefan Kardoš (born 1966), Slovene writer
- Tivadar Kardos (1921–1998), Hungarian chess player

== See also ==
- Kardos, Hungary
- Kardoskút, Hungary
- Karlos (name)
