= Karlous =

Karlous is a masculine given name. Notable people with the name include:

- Karlous Marx Shinohamba (born 1965), Namibian politician
- Karlous Miller (born 1983), American comedian, actor, and rapper

== See also ==
- Karlos (name)
