= Karłowo =

Karłowo may refer to the following places:

- Karłowo, Masovian Voivodeship (east-central Poland)
- Karłowo, Bytów County in Pomeranian Voivodeship (north Poland)
- Karłowo, Pomeranian Voivodeship (north Poland)
- Karłowo, Warmian-Masurian Voivodeship (north Poland)

== See also ==
- Karlow (name)
