= Karlow (name) =

Karlow or Karlów is a surname. Notable people with this name include the following:

- Pierre Karlów (fl. 1945–1956), Polish footballer
- Serge Karlow, known as Peter Karlow (1921 – 2005), CIA technical officer

== See also ==
- Karlo (name)
- Karlos (name)
- Karlov (surname)`
- Karow (disambiguation)
- Kalow (disambiguation)
- Karłowo (disambiguation)
- Karolów (disambiguation)
