= 1998 in chess =

Below is a list of events in chess in 1998, as well as the top ten FIDE rated chess players in July of that year.

== Top players ==
FIDE top 10 players by Elo rating - July 1998

1. Garry Kasparov Russia 2815
2. Viswanathan Anand India 2795
3. Vladimir Kramnik Russia 2780
4. Vassily Ivanchuk Ukraine 2730
5. Anatoly Karpov Russia 2725
6. Alexei Shirov Spain 2720
7. Gata Kamsky United States 2720
8. Michael Adams England 2715
9. Peter Svidler Russia 2710
10. Veselin Topalov Bulgaria 2700

== Chess news in brief ==
- Anatoly Karpov defeats Viswanathan Anand (5-3) in Lausanne to retain the FIDE World Chess Championship. There is some dissatisfaction that Karpov had significantly greater opportunity to rest and prepare beforehand.
- Garry Kasparov announces the formation of the World Chess Council (WCC). Humorously, the world's chess media later dubs WCC as standing for 'World Championship Cancelled', when a succession of sponsorship deals fall by the wayside.
- Following Anand's refusal to play, the WCC Candidates match is held in Spain between substitute Alexei Shirov and Vladimir Kramnik. Shirov wins the contest 5½-3½, but there is no financial reward, only the belief that the winner goes on to play against Kasparov for the world title. However, following the loss of sponsorship, the title match is cancelled and Shirov is left with nothing. Meanwhile, Kasparov invites a challenge from Anand, as world No.2 in the ratings, instead.
- Victory at the 60th (Hoogovens) Corus chess tournament, Wijk aan Zee is shared by Anand and Kramnik (8½/11). Karpov can only manage a 50% score.
- Anand wins strong events at Linares, Madrid (6½/9), Frankfurt and Tilburg (7½/11, ahead of Peter Leko on 7/11).
- Anand wins the 1998 Chess Oscar.
- Dortmund Sparkassen Tournament is won by Kramnik, on tiebreak from Michael Adams, Peter Svidler (all 6/9).
- 7th Melody Amber tournament, Monte Carlo is won jointly by Shirov and Kramnik.
- The 33rd Chess Olympiad is held in Elista, Kalmykia. Russia wins gold; USA wins silver and Ukraine wins bronze on tie-break from Israel. 110 teams participate, comprising 634 players (including 171 GMs, 135 IMs and 58 FMs). The Women's event is won by China, ahead of Russia and Georgia.
- The PCA publishes its own rating list: Kasparov - 2825; Anand - 2775; Kramnik - 2758 ...
- Kasparov and Veselin Topalov play out a 3-3 draw in an Advanced Chess match; the players are allowed to use a computer to access databases and for analysis purposes.
- Kasparov and Kramnik play a 24-game blitz (5 minute) match at the Cosmos Hotel in Moscow. The match, spread over two days and broadcast 'pay per view' on ICC, is drawn 12-12.
- Alexander Morozevich wins the 51st Russian Chess Championship in Saint Petersburg, a strong Pamplona tournament (8/9) and is Russia's top scorer at the Olympiad. Such rapid progress gives rise to speculation that he will soon enter the world top 10.
- Ukrainian prodigy Ruslan Ponomariov wins the Donetsk Zonal at the age of fifteen, ahead of established masters Alexander Onischuk, Oleg Romanishin, Vladimir Tukmakov, Gennady Kuzmin and Vladimir Malaniuk.
- The World Junior Championship is held in Kozhikode, India. The winner of the open section is Darmen Sadvakasov of Kazakhstan, from Zhang Zhong and Hristos Banikas. In the girls' event, Hoang Thanh Trang of Vietnam takes gold from Iweta Radziewicz and Irina Krush.
- Alexander Goldin wins the World Open in Philadelphia with an 8½/9 score.
- English Grandmaster Julian Hodgson wins the National Open in Las Vegas, on tie-break.
- Boris Gulko wins the Saitek U.S. Masters in Waikiki.
- Armenian grandmaster Artashes Minasian wins the New York Open.
- Chess organiser and Spanish businessman Luis Rentero suffers serious injuries in a car crash and then recovers from a 23-day coma.
- Matthew Sadler wins the 73rd Hastings International Chess Congress.
- The U.S. Chess Championship is won by Nick DeFirmian in Denver.
- Irina Krush wins the U.S. Women's Chess Championship, aged just 14.
- Nigel Short takes his third British Chess Championship in Torquay.
- Judit Polgár and Gulko share the 99th U.S. Open in Hawaii.
- Some exceptional young talents are on display at the European Youth Chess Championships, held at Mureck. Boys' winners include Teimour Radjabov (Under-12) and Gabriel Sargissian (Under-16). In the girls' categories, Anna Muzychuk wins the Under-10, while Marie Sebag takes home the Under-12 gold medal.
- Vladimir Bagirov of Latvia wins the 8th World Senior Chess Championship (on tie-break from Wolfgang Uhlmann) in Grieskirchen, Austria. Former world championship candidates Mark Taimanov and Borislav Ivkov also take part.
- Shirov plays a match with Zbyněk Hráček in Ostrava and wins by a convincing 5-1 margin.
- Hikaru Nakamura becomes the youngest ever U.S. master at 10 years, 79 days.

== Deaths ==
- Efim Geller, leading Soviet Grandmaster and former World Championship Candidate - November 17
- László Szabó, Hungarian Grandmaster and former world top 10 player - August 8
- Mona May Karff, seven times U.S. Women's Champion - January 10
- Carlos Guimard, Argentine Grandmaster, three times the national champion - ?
- Boris Blumin, twice champion of Canada - February 16
- Rosendo Balinas, Jr., Filipino Grandmaster, writer, journalist and lawyer - September 24.
- Leho Laurine, Estonian master and former national champion - January 31
- David Vincent Hooper, leading chess historian and former London Champion - May
- Tivadar Kardos, Hungarian chess problemist and author - May 15
- Joan Targ, sister of Bobby Fischer - June 2
