= Idora Hegel =

Croatian figure skater

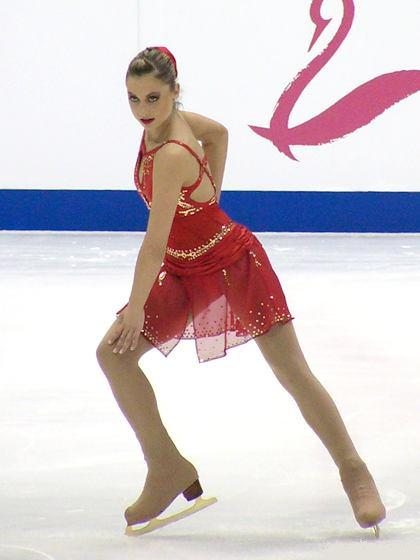
- Hegel at the 2004 NHK Trophy

Personal information
- Born: 3 April 1983 (age 43) Zagreb
- Height: 1.66 m (5 ft 5 in)

Figure skating career
- Country: Croatia
- Skating club: KK Leda Zagreb
- Began skating: 1987
- Retired: 2007

Idora Hegel (born 3 April 1983, in Zagreb) is a Croatian former competitive figure skater. She is the 2004 Golden Spin of Zagreb champion and a seven-time (2000–2005, 2007) Croatian national champion. She represented 2002 Winter Olympics in Salt Lake City and at the 2006 Winter Olympics in Turin. At both events, she qualified for the free skate and finished 19th overall. She also reached the free skate at sixteen ISU Championships – six Worlds, seven Europeans, and three Junior Worlds.

== Programs ==
Season	Short program	Free skating
2007–08	Tango de Roxanne (from Moulin Rouge!) by Craig Armstrong	Malaguena - A Touch of Latin performed by Stanley Black
2006–07	Blues for Klook by Eddie Louis	Malaguena - A Touch of Latin performed by Stanley Black
2005–06	Blues for Klook by Eddie Louis	The Nutcracker by Pyotr Ilyich Tchaikovsky
2004–05	Legend from Wieniawski - Gypsy Songs by Sarasate	Don Juan de Marco by Michael Kamen
2002–04	Gypsy Songs by Sarasate	The Mask of Zorro by James Horner
2001–02	Nyah (from Mission Impossible 2) by Hans Zimmer	13th Warrior by Jerry Goldsmith
2000–01	Exprompt by Vanessa-Mae	Carmen Suite by Rodion Shchedrin Leningrad Philharmonic Orchestra

== Competitive highlights ==
GP: Grand Prix; JGP: Junior Grand Prix

International
Event	96–97	97–98	98–99	99–00	00–01	01–02	02–03	03–04	04–05	05–06	06–07	07–08
Olympics						19th				19th		
Worlds			25th		25th	14th	24th	16th	13th	15th	21st	
Europeans			21st	27th	22nd	18th	14th		9th	11th	16th	
GP Cup of China										9th		
GP NHK Trophy									10th			
GP Skate America									9th	10th		
GP Skate Canada												12th
Finlandia Trophy								5th				
Golden Spin				13th	11th	12th		3rd	1st	4th		8th
Schäfer Memorial						5th	4th					
Nepela Memorial								4th				
Universiade									7th		8th	
Copenhagen							1st	1st				
International: Junior
Junior Worlds	23rd	24th	23rd									
JGP France		19th										
JGP Germany		23rd	WD									
JGP Poland					11th							
EYOF			18th									
Blue Swords	24th J											
Golden Bear				1st J	4th J	1st J						
Triglav Trophy				3rd J								
National
Croatian Champ.	4th		3rd	1st	1st	1st	1st	1st	1st		1st	
