= Karlos =

Karlos may refer to

- Karlos (name)
- Juan Karlos, Filipino rock band

== See also ==
- Carlos (disambiguation)
- Karlo (disambiguation)
- Karlov (disambiguation)
