= Karolów =

Karolów may refer to the following places:

- Karolów, Łódź Voivodeship (central Poland)
- Karolów, Gmina Chotcza in Masovian Voivodeship (east-central Poland)
- Karolów, Świętokrzyskie Voivodeship (south-central Poland)
- Karolów, Gmina Sienno in Masovian Voivodeship (east-central Poland)

== See also ==
- Karlow (name)
- Karolos
