= Karolos =

Karolos or Károlos is a Greek masculine given name that is an alternate form of Karl. Notable people referred to by this name include the following:

== Given name ==
- Karolos Koun (1908–1987) Greek theater director
- Karolos Papoulias (1929–2021), Greek politician
- Karolos Trikolidis, Austrian conductor

== See also ==
- Karlos (name)
- Karolis
- Karolów (disambiguation)
