= Jari Kessler =

Croatian-Italian figure skater (born 1996)

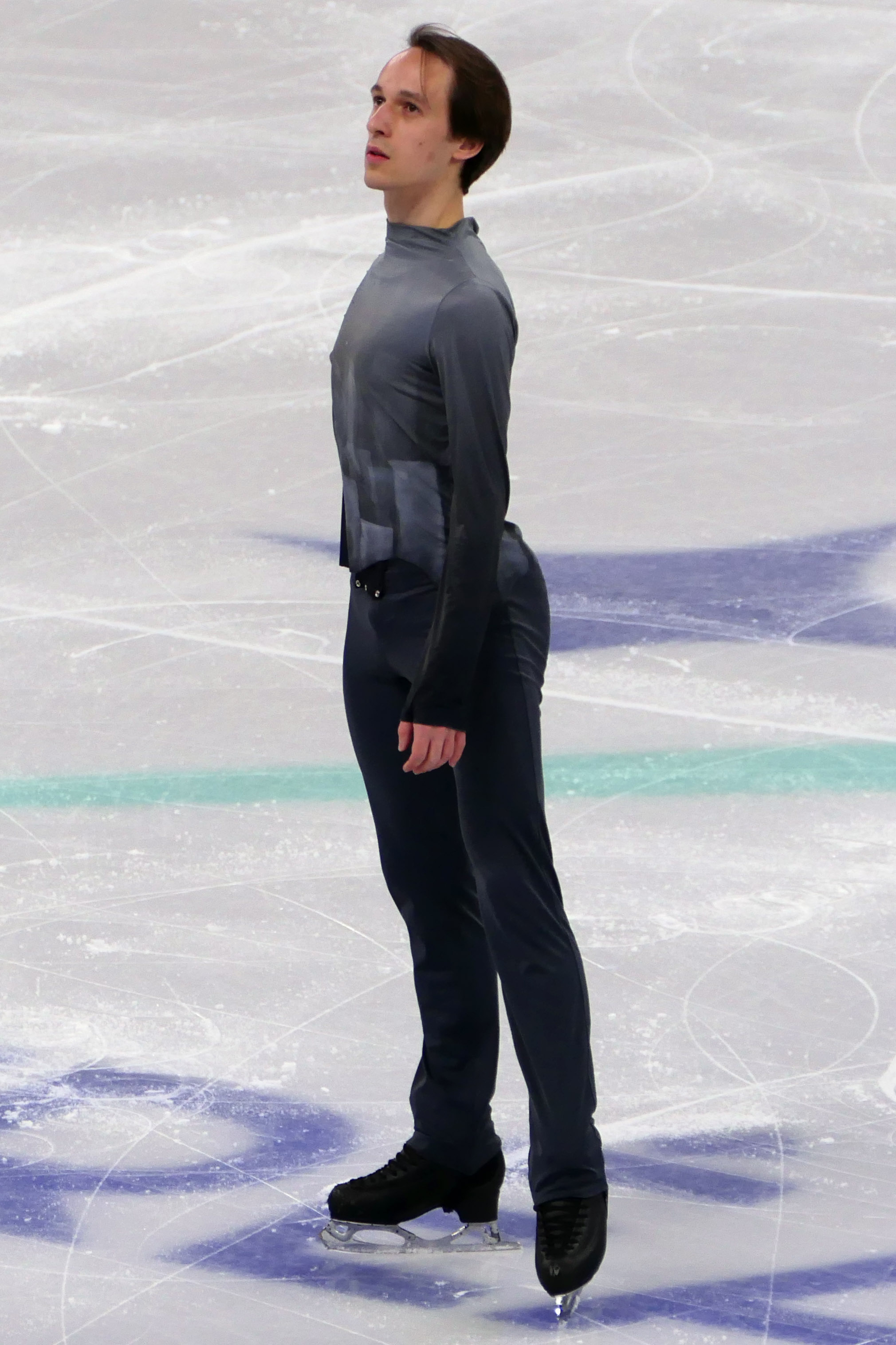
- Jari Kessler at the 2024 World Championships

Personal information
- Born: 29 November 1996 (age 29) Cles, Italy
- Home town: Caldaro, Italy
- Height: 1.72 m (5 ft 7 1/2 in)

Figure skating career
- Country: Croatia (since 2019); Italy (2012–19)
- Discipline: Men's singles
- Coach: Angelina Turenko; Alisa Mikonsaari
- Skating club: KK Leda
- Began skating: 2009

Medal record
Representing Croatia
Croatian Championships
Gold medal – first place	2020 Zagreb	Singles
Gold medal – first place	2023 Zagreb	Singles
Gold medal – first place	2024 Zagreb	Singles
Gold medal – first place	2025 Zagreb	Singles
Gold medal – first place	2026 Zagreb	Singles

Jari Kessler (born 29 November 1996) is a retired Croatian and Italian figure skater. For Croatia, he is a five-time Croatian national champion (2020, 2023–26) and has won medals at 14 international competitions, including gold at the 2020 NRW Trophy, 2023 Bellu Memorial, and 2025 Tayside Trophy.

He represented Italy until spring 2019, winning three senior international medals.

== Personal life ==
Kessler was born in Cles, Italy. He played pond hockey before switching to figure skating.

== Career ==
=== Early career and skating for Italy ===
Kessler began figure skating in 2009. His first skating coach was Ludmila Mladenova. Originally competing for Italy, he moved up to the junior ranks for the 2012–13 figure skating season. He would eventually make his senior international debut in January 2016, at the Mentor Toruń Cup in Poland.

Kessler's first senior medals came in the 2017–18 season. He won bronze at the Mentor Toruń Cup, in January, and another bronze at the Egna Spring Trophy, in April.

In October 2018, he took bronze at the Golden Bear of Zagreb in Croatia. The Egna Spring Trophy in March 2019 was his final competition for Italy.

=== For Croatia ===
==== 2019–20 season ====
Kessler competed at the 2020 Croatian Championships where he won his first national title.

==== 2020–21 season: International debut for Croatia ====
Coached by Lorenzo Magri, Angelina Turenko, Alisa Mikonsaari, and Eva Martinek, Kessler made his international debut for Croatia at the 2020 CS Budapest Trophy, where he placed seventh. In November, he would win gold at the NRW Trophy in Germany. He subsequently finished the season with a twelfth-place finish at the 2021 International Challenge Cup.

==== 2021–22 season: European Championships debut ====
Kessler started the season by competing on the 2021–22 ISU Challenger Series, finishing fifteenth at the 2021 CS Nebelhorn Trophy, thirteenth at the 2021 CS Cup of Austria, and nineteenth at the 2021 CS Golden Spin of Zagreb. He also finished seventh at the 2021 Budapest Trophy which took place between the first two Challenger Series events.

In January, Kessler competed at the 2022 European Championships in Tallinn, Estonia, finishing thirty-first in the short program, failing to advance to the free skate segment. In February, he took bronze at the Merano Ice Trophy, silver at the Jegvirag Cup, and placed fifth at the 2021 Bellu Memorial.

==== 2022–23 season: World Championships debut ====
Kessler began the season by competing at the 2022 CS Nebelhorn Trophy, where he finished sixth. He would then go on to win gold at the 2023 Croatian Championships.

Going on to compete at the 2023 European Championships in Espoo, Finland, Kessler qualified for the free skate segment after finishing nineteenth in the short program. He would also finish nineteenth in the free skate and nineteenth overall.

In February, Kessler won the bronze medal at the 2023 Dragon Trophy, finished fourth at the 2023 Tallink Hotels Cup, and won gold at the 2023 Bellu Memorial.

Making his World Championship debut at the 2023 World Championships in Saitama, Japan, Kessler finished thirty-first.

==== 2023–24 season ====
Kessler started the season by winning bronze at the 2023 Tirnavia Ice Cup and at the 2023 NRW Trophy. In December, Kessler placed eleventh at the 2023 CS Golden Spin of Zagreb before winning his third national title at the 2024 Croatian Championships.

One month later, Kessler competed at the 2024 European Championships in Kaunas, Lithuania, where he placed twenty-seventh in the short program and did not advance to the free skate segment.

Kessler subsequently competed at the 2024 Bavarian Open and the 2024 Merano Cup, finishing ninth and seventh, respectively.

Selected to compete at the 2024 World Championships in Montreal, Quebec, Canada, Kessler would finish in twenty-ninth place.

==== 2024–25 season ====
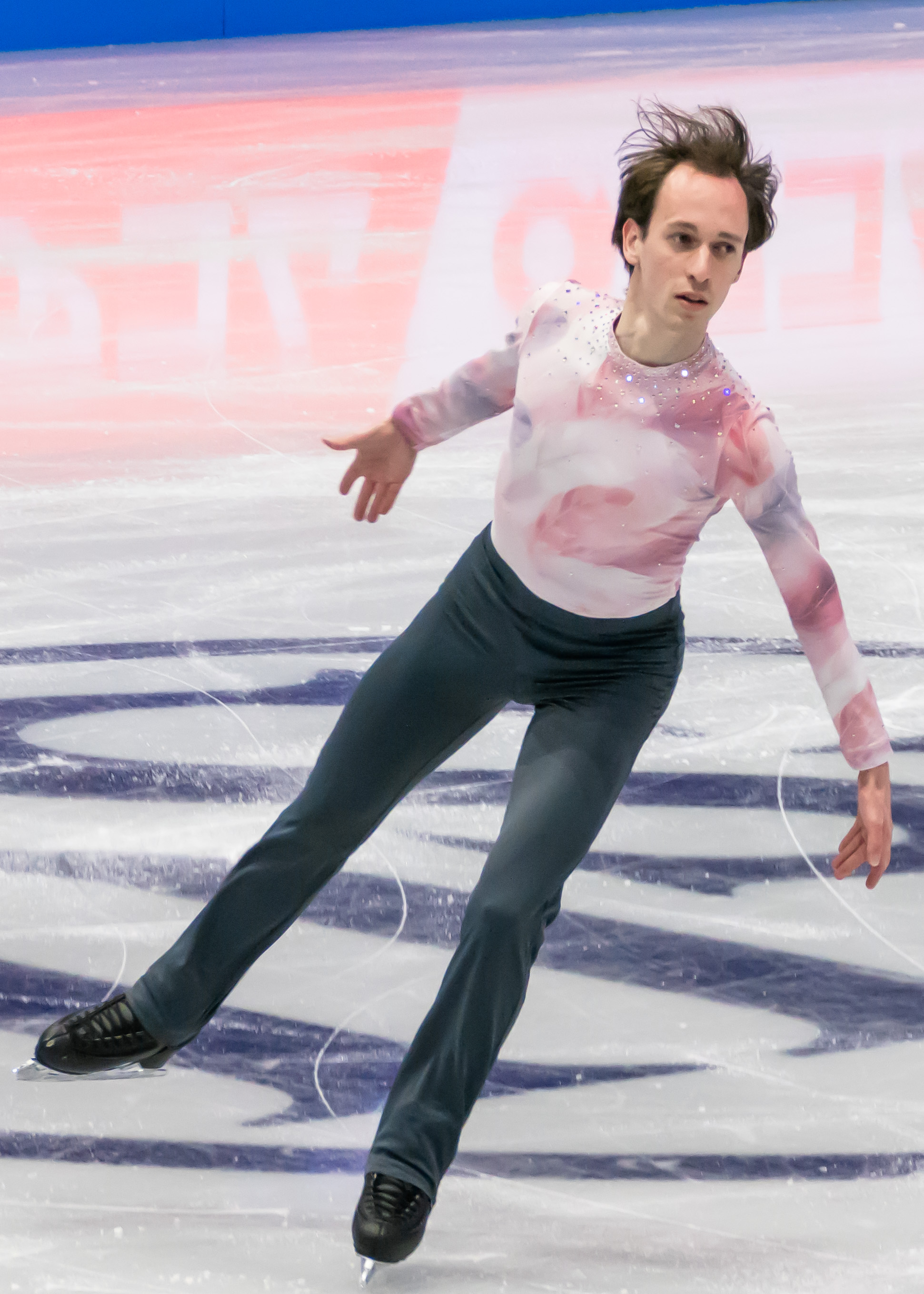
Kessler performing his short program at the 2025 World Championships

Kessler began the season with a twelfth-place finish at the 2024 CS Nebelhorn Trophy. He then went on to win his second consecutive national title at the 2025 Croatian Championships.

After winning the bronze medal at the 2025 Volvo Open Cup, Kessler competed at the 2025 European Championships in Tallinn, Estonia. He placed thirty-fourth in the short program and did not advance to the free skate segment. Kessler then went on to win gold at the 2025 Dragon Trophy, bronze at the 2025 Merano Ice Trophy, and silver at the 2025 Bellu Memorial.

In March, Kessler competed at the 2025 World Championships, held in Boston, Massachusetts, United States. He placed thirty-fourth in the short program and did not advance to the free skate segment.

==== 2025–26 season: Final competitive season ====
Kessler opened his season by competing at the ISU Skate to Milano, where he finished in thirteenth place. He subsequently placed eleventh at the 2025 CS Nepela Memorial. In October, Kessler won gold at both at the 2025 Tayside Trophy and the 2025 Golden Bear of Zagreb. He then followed up these results with a seventh-place finish at the 2025 CS Golden Spin of Zagreb.

In January, Kessler competed at the 2026 European Championships in Sheffield, England, United Kingdom, finishing in fourteenth place overall. The following week, he placed sixth at the 2026 Merano Ice Trophy.

== Programs ==
Season	Short program	Free skating	Exhibition
2025–2026	Clair de Lune by Claude Debussy choreo. by Ekaterina Ivleva	To Build a Home by The Cinematic Orchestra choreo. by Ekaterina Ivleva	
2024–2025	In This Shirt by The Irrepressibles choreo. by Elisabetta Leccardi	November by Max Richter; Spiegel im Spiegel by Arvo Pärt performed by Angèle Dubeau choreo. by Ekaterina Ivleva	Volevo essere un duro by Lucio Corsi
2023–2024	Angela by The Lumineers choreo. by Drew Meekins	November by Max Richter; Spiegel im Spiegel by Arvo Pärt performed by Angèle Dubeau choreo. by Ekaterina Ivleva	
2022–2023	Angela by The Lumineers choreo. by Drew Meekins	The Home of Dark Butterflies; Forgiveness; Memories in Water; Spring Arrives by Panu Aaltio choreo. by Barbara Riboldi	
2021–2022	Mess Is Mine by Vance Joy arranged by Hugo Chouinard choreo. by Benoît Richaud	The Scent of Love (from The Piano) by Michael Nyman arranged by Hugo Chouinard choreo. by Barbara Riboldi	

== Competitive highlights ==
- JGP – Event of the ISU Junior Grand Prix Series
- CS – Event of the ISU Challenger Series
- TBD – Assigned
- WD – Withdrew from competition

=== Single skating (for Croatia) ===
Competition placements at senior level
Season	2019–20	2020–21	2021–22	2022–23	2023–24	2024–25	2025–26
World Championships				31st	29th	34th	
European Championships			31st	19th	27th	34th	14th
Croatian Championships	1st			1st	1st	1st	1st
CS Budapest Trophy		7th	7th				
CS Golden Spin of Zagreb			19th		11th		7th
CS Ice Challenge			13th				
CS Nebelhorn Trophy			15th	6th		12th	
CS Nepela Memorial							11th
Bavarian Open					9th		
Bellu Memorial			5th	1st		2nd	
Challenge Cup		12th					
Dragon Trophy				3rd		1st	
Golden Bear of Zagreb							1st
Jégvirág Cup			2nd				
Merano Ice Trophy			3rd		7th	3rd	6th
NRW Trophy		1st			3rd		
Skate to Milano							13th
Tallink Hotels Cup				4th			2nd
Tayside Trophy							1st
Tirnavia Ice Cup					3rd		
Volvo Open Cup						3rd	

=== Single skating (for Italy) ===
Competition placements at senior level
Season	2015–16	2016–17	2017–18	2018–19
Italian Championships		4th	8th	5th
CS Alpen Trophy				16th
CS Golden Spin of Zagreb			18th	
Challenge Cup			7th	
Coupe de Printemps			10th	
Cup of Tyrol	6th	14th		
Dragon Trophy				6th
Egna Spring Trophy	5th		3rd	5th
Golden Bear of Zagreb		8th		3rd
Hellmut Seibt Memorial	11th			
Merano Cup		11th		
Mentor Cup	6th	15th	3rd	9th
Santa Claus Cup		8th		

Competition placements at junior level
Season	2012–13	2013–14	2014–15	2015–16
Italian Championships		14th	11th	4th
Bavarian Open			8th	
Crystal Skate of Romania			4th	
Denkova-Staviski Cup			4th	
Dragon Trophy	5th			
Golden Bear of Zagreb				2nd
Leu Scheu Memorial				9th
Lombardia Trophy	10th			
Merano Cup			6th	
Santa Claus Cup				4th
Sportland Trophy			4th	

== Detailed results ==
ISU personal best scores in the +5/-5 GOE System
Segment	Type	Score	Event
Total	TSS	214.45	2025 CS Golden Spin of Zagreb
Short program	TSS	75.56	2025 CS Golden Spin of Zagreb
Short program	TES	37.32	2025 CS Golden Spin of Zagreb
Short program	PCS	39.45	2025 CS Nepela Memorial
Free skating	TSS	138.89	2025 CS Golden Spin of Zagreb
Free skating	TES	61.79	2025 CS Golden Spin of Zagreb
Free skating	PCS	78.10	2025 CS Golden Spin of Zagreb

ISU personal best scores in the +3/-3 GOE System
Segment	Type	Score	Event
Total	TSS	151.94	2017 CS Golden Spin of Zagreb
Short program	TSS	50.87	2017 CS Golden Spin of Zagreb
Short program	TES	21.67	2017 CS Golden Spin of Zagreb
Short program	PCS	30.20	2017 CS Golden Spin of Zagreb
Free skating	TSS	101.07	2017 CS Golden Spin of Zagreb
Free skating	TES	46.57	2017 CS Golden Spin of Zagreb
Free skating	PCS	56.50	2017 CS Golden Spin of Zagreb

Results in the 2024–25 season
Date	Event	SP		FS		Total	
Date	Event	P	Score	P	Score	P	Score
Sep 19–21, 2024	(Germany) 2024 CS Nebelhorn Trophy	12	69.59	13	122.14	12	191.73
Dec 21–22, 2024	(Croatia) 2025 Croatian Championships	1	49.41	1	95.86	1	145.27
Jan 16-19, 2025	(Latvia) 2025 Volvo Open Cup	3	63.90	2	115.39	3	179.29
Jan 28 – Feb 2, 2025	(Estonia) 2025 European Championships	34	50.83	—N/a	—N/a	34	50.83
Feb 6–9, 2025	(Slovenia) 2025 Dragon Trophy	1	67.37	1	130.86	1	198.23
Feb 13–16, 2025	(Italy) 2025 Merano Ice Trophy	2	73.40	3	134.58	3	207.98
Feb 18–23, 2025	(Romania) 2025 Bellu Memorial	3	68.35	2	141.31	2	209.66
Mar 24–30, 2025	(United States) 2025 World Championships	34	61.44	—N/a	—N/a	34	61.44

Results in the 2025–26 season
Date	Event	SP		FS		Total	
Date	Event	P	Score	P	Score	P	Score
Sep 18–21, 2025	(China) 2025 Skate to Milano	12	66.50	14	124.04	13	190.54
Sep 25–27, 2025	(Slovakia) 2025 CS Nepela Memorial	8	74.48	12	136.33	11	210.81
Oct 11–12, 2025	(United Kingdom) 2025 Tayside Trophy	6	62.83	1	141.53	1	204.36
Oct 24–27, 2025	(Croatia) 2025 Golden Bear of Zagreb	1	72.74	1	134.43	1	207.17
Dec 3–6, 2025	(Croatia) 2025 CS Golden Spin of Zagreb	8	75.56	6	138.89	7	214.45
Dec 20-21, 2025	(Croatia) 2026 Croatian Championships	1	74.79	1	140.60	1	215.39
Jan 13–18, 2026	(United Kingdom) 2026 European Championships	20	66.32	13	135.14	14	201.46
Jan 22–25, 2026	(Italy) 2026 Merano Ice Trophy	5	68.78	6	123.35	6	192.13
Feb 19-22, 2026	(Estonia) 2026 Tallink Hotels Cup	2	69.26	2	139.12	2	208.38
