= Antonio Souza-Kordeiru =

Russian pair skater (born 1993)

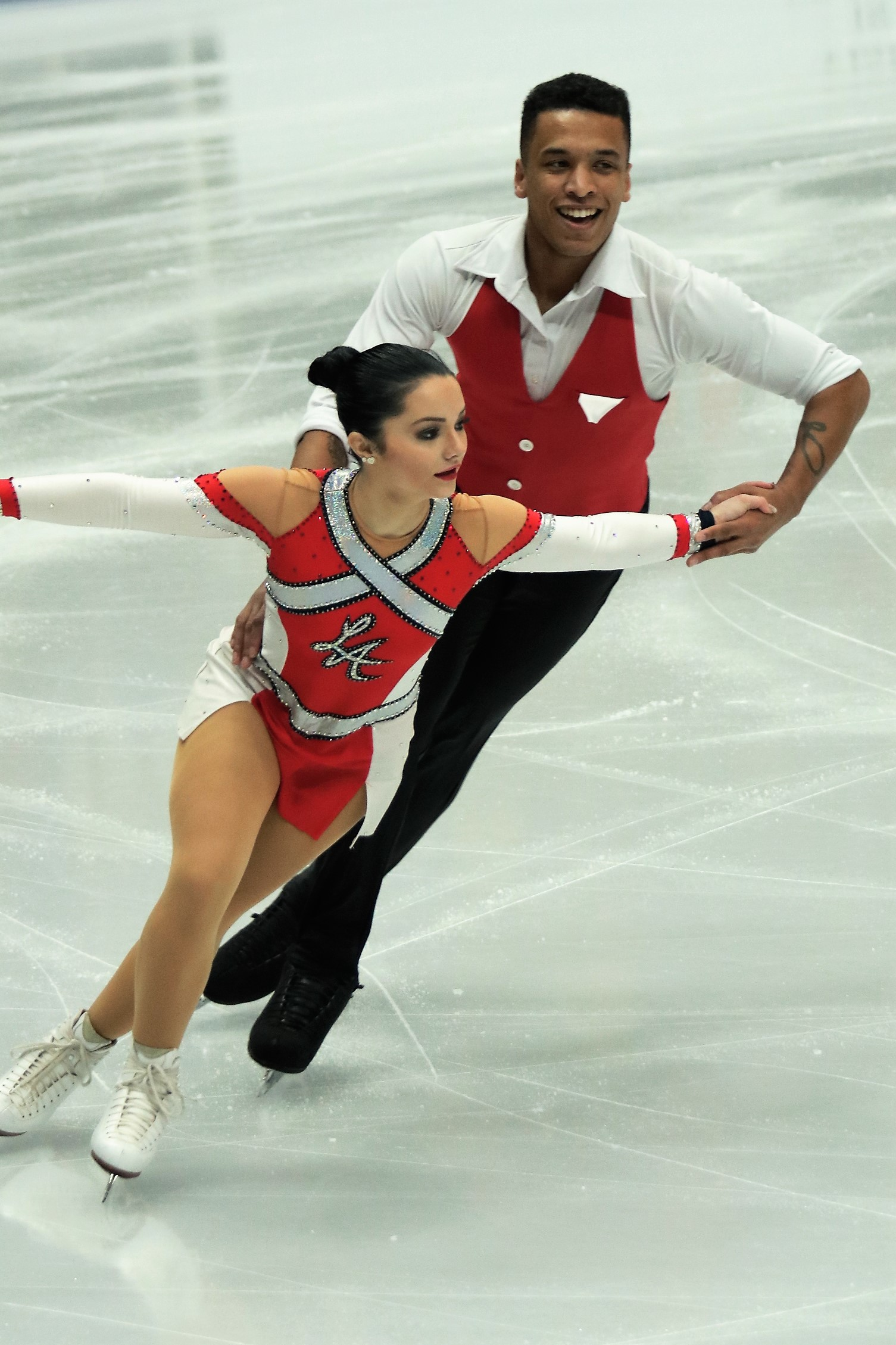
- Petranović/Souza-Kordeiru in 2018

Personal information
- Native name: Антонио Лауделино Соуза-Кордейру
- Full name: Antonio Laudelino Souza-Kordeiru
- Other names: Antonino Souza-Kordyeru; António Souza-Cordeiro
- Born: 21 March 1993 (age 33) Moscow, Russia
- Height: 1.78 m (5 ft 10 in)

Figure skating career
- Country: Croatia
- Partner: Lana Petranović
- Coach: Dmitri Savin
- Skating club: KK Medo Zagreb
- Began skating: 2000
- Retired: 2022

Antonio Laudelino Souza-Kordeiru (Russian: Антонио Лауделино Соуза-Кордейру, born 21 March 1993) is a retired Russian pair skater. Skating with Lana Petranović for Croatia, he has competed in the final segment at four European Championships.

== Personal life ==
Souza-Kordeiru was born on 21 March 1993 in Moscow, Russia. His mother is Russian and his father is from Portugal, of Afro-Cuban heritage.

== Skating career ==
=== Early years ===
Souza-Kordeiru began learning to skate in 2000. He skated in partnership with Evgenia Kazantseva before teaming up with Arina Cherniavskaia. Representing Russia, Cherniavskaia/Souza-Kordeiru made their international debut in November 2012, taking the junior bronze medal at the Warsaw Cup.

=== 2013–2014 season ===
In August 2013, Cherniavskaia/Souza-Kordeiru appeared at their first ISU Junior Grand Prix (JGP) event. Coached by Arina Ushakova and Andrei Hekalo in Moscow, they placed 5th at the 2013 JGP in Riga, Latvia, and then won silver at their next JGP assignment, which took place in October in Ostrava, Czech Republic.

=== 2014–2015 season ===
Cherniavskaia/Souza-Kordeiru moved up to the senior level, coached by Ushakova. Making their Grand Prix debut, the pair placed eighth at the 2014 Cup of China in November. Later that month, they competed at the 2014 CS Ice Challenge and 2014 CS Warsaw Cup, finishing fourth at both events, but withdrew from their second Grand Prix assignment, the 2014 NHK Trophy. They placed eighth at the 2015 Russian Championships.

=== 2015–2016 season ===
In October, Cherniavskaia/Souza-Kordeiru finished fourth at the 2015 CS Mordovian Ornament. It was their final international together. The pair did not compete at the 2016 Russian Championships.

In 2016, Croatia's Lana Petranović arrived in Moscow in search of a skating partner. She and Souza-Kordeiru teamed up in spring 2016 to compete for Croatia.

=== 2016–2017 season ===
Making their international debut as a team, Petranović/Souza-Kordeiru placed fourth at the 2016 CS Warsaw Cup in November. They finished fifth at the 2016 CS Golden Spin of Zagreb in December; 15th at the 2017 European Championships in January in Ostrava, Czech Republic; and 21st at the 2017 World Championships in March in Helsinki, Finland. They were coached by Yuri Larionov in Moscow.

=== 2017–2018 season ===
Petranović underwent an operation after injuring the meniscus in her knee and returned to the ice after three months. Due to her injury, the pair was unable to compete in September at the 2017 CS Nebelhorn Trophy, which served as the final qualification opportunity for the 2018 Winter Olympics. They returned to competition in January, placing 12th at the 2018 European Championships in Moscow. In March, they placed 21st at the 2018 World Championships in Milan, Italy. They were coached by Larionov and Dmitri Savin in Moscow.

=== 2018–2019 season ===
Coached by Savin in Moscow, Petranović/Souza-Kordeiru placed seventh at their first event of the season, the 2018 CS Lombardia Trophy. They competed at two other Challenger events of the season, the 2018 CS Nebelhorn Trophy and 2018 CS Golden Spin of Zagreb, placing eighth and seventh. They finished the season placing eighth at the 2019 European Championships and sixteenth at the 2019 World Championships.

=== 2019–2020 season ===
Petranović/Souza-Kordeiru placed twelfth at the 2019 CS Golden Spin of Zagreb and fifteenth at the 2020 European Championships. The 2020 World Championships were cancelled as a result of the COVID-19 pandemic.

=== 2020–2021 season ===
Petranović/Souza-Kordeiru placed twenty-first at the 2021 World Championships.

=== 2021–2022 season ===
Petranović/Souza-Kordeiru began the season at the 2021 CS Nebelhorn Trophy, seeking to qualify a berth at the 2022 Winter Olympics. They placed twelfth, outside of qualification. They went on to finish sixth at the Budapest Trophy and eleventh at the 2021 CS Golden Spin of Zagreb, and then sixteenth at the 2022 European Championships.

In February, he announced his retirement from competitive figure skating. He went on to work as a coach, working in Turkey with Turkish junior skaters Kaan Sanal and Leyla Çetin.

== Programs ==
=== With Petranović ===
Season	Short program	Free skating
2021–2022	Palladio by Karl Jenkins	Butterflies and Hurricanes by Muse
2020–2021	The Greatest Show (from The Greatest Showman) performed by Hugh Jackman	Butterflies and Hurricanes by Muse
2019–2020	I Put a Spell on You	Writing's on the Wall by Sam Smith
2018–2019	The Greatest Show (from The Greatest Showman) by Hugh Jackman	Light of the Seven (from Game of Thrones) by Ramin Djawadi; The In-Between; Imperfection by Evanescence
2016–2018	Strange Birds performed by Birdy	Happy (Woodkid Sad Remix) by Pharrell Williams; Stayin' Alive by the Bee Gees; Disco Inferno performed by The Trammps

=== With Cherniavskaia ===
Season	Short program	Free skating
2015–2016	French music	Malagueña by Ernesto Lecuona performed by Mantovani and his Orchestra
2014–2015	Moon River by Henry Mancini, Andy Williams	In the Mood; I Know Why (from Sun Valley Serenade) by Glenn Miller
2013–2014	Night Walk in a City	Style People (soundtrack); We Love Boogie-Woogie

== Competitive highlights ==
GP: Grand Prix; CS: Challenger Series; JGP: Junior Grand Prix

=== With Petranović for Croatia ===
International
Event	16–17	17–18	18–19	19–20	20–21	21–22
World Champ.	21st	21st	16th	C	21st	
European Champ.	15th	12th	8th	15th		16th
CS Golden Spin	5th		7th	12th		11th
CS Lombardia Trophy			7th			
CS Nebelhorn Trophy			8th			12th
CS Warsaw Cup	4th					
Budapest Trophy						6th
Challenge Cup		4th		8th		
Ice Star			4th			
Open Ice Mall			1st			
National
Croatian Champ.		1st	1st	1st		
TBD = Assigned; WD = Withdrew; C = Event cancelled

=== With Cherniavskaia for Russia ===
International
Event	12–13	13–14	14–15	15–16
GP Cup of China			8th	
GP NHK Trophy			WD	
CS Ice Challenge			4th	
CS Mordovian Ornament				4th
CS Warsaw Cup			4th	
International: Junior
JGP Czech Republic		2nd		
JGP Latvia		5th		
Bavarian Open	2nd J			
Coupe du Printemps	2nd J			
NRW Trophy	2nd J	1st J		
Warsaw Cup	3rd J			
National
Russian Champ.			8th	
Russian Junior Champ.	5th	7th		
J = Junior level
