= Lana Petranović =

Croatian pair skater

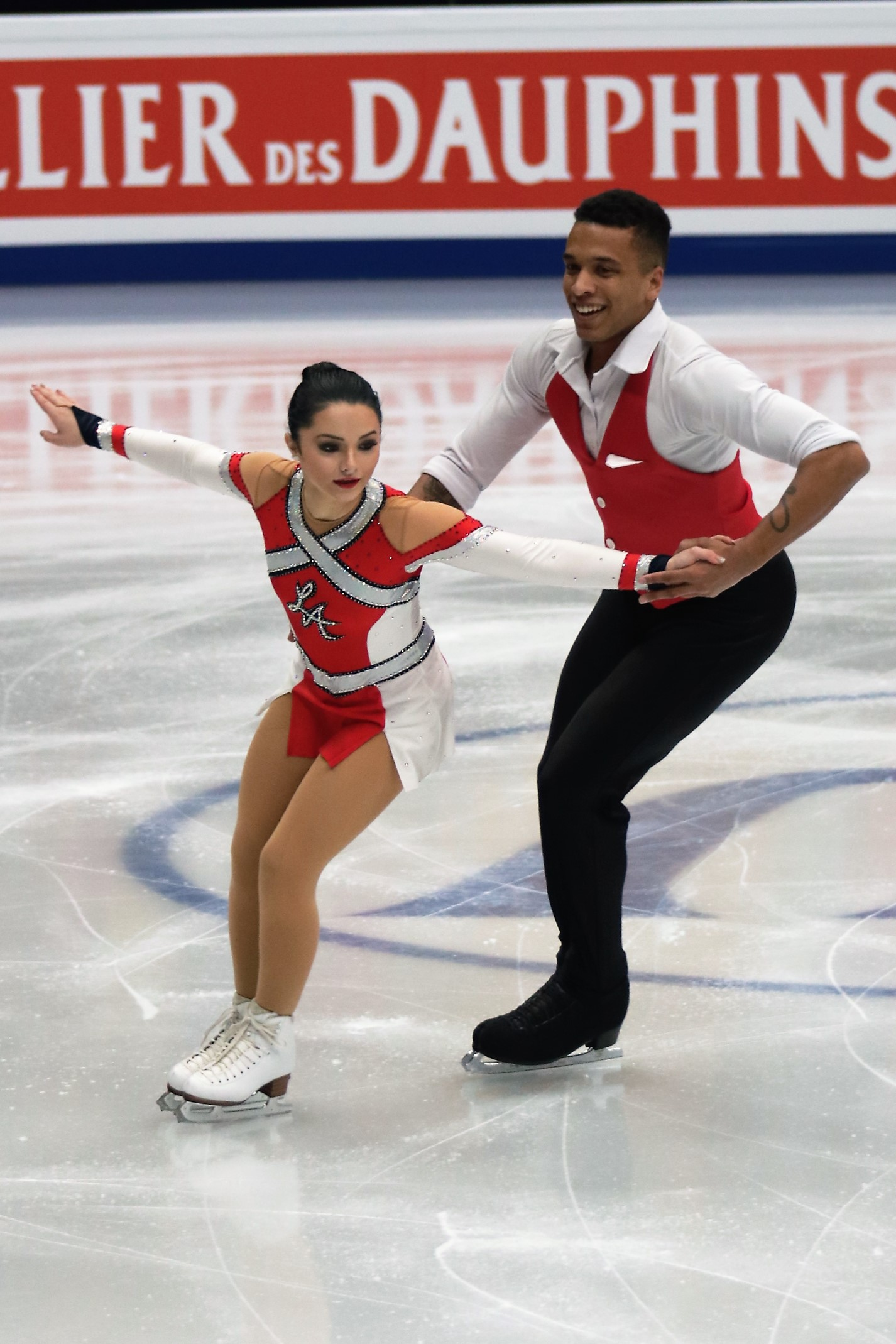
- Petranović and Souza-Kordeiru in 2018

Personal information
- Born: 4 January 2000 (age 26) Zagreb, Croatia
- Height: 1.47 m (4 ft 10 in)

Figure skating career
- Country: Croatia
- Coach: Dmitri Savin
- Skating club: KK Medo Zagreb
- Began skating: 2007

Lana Petranović (born 4 January 2000) is a Croatian pair skater. With her skating partner, Antonio Souza-Kordeiru, she has competed in the final segment at four European Championships.

== Skating career ==
=== Early years ===
Petranović began learning to skate in 2007. As a singles skater, she appeared at one ISU Junior Grand Prix event, in October 2014. She last competed in singles in January 2015, at the European Youth Olympic Winter Festival in Dornbirn, Austria.

Petranović decided to switch to pair skating and formed a partnership with Michael Lueck. The pair trained in the United States. They made their international debut in September 2015, at the Lombardia Trophy in Italy, and competed at six other competitions, including three ISU Challenger Series events, before parting ways. Their final competition together was the Hellmut Seibt Memorial in February 2016.

Petranović traveled to Moscow to find a new partner. She teamed up with Russia's Antonio Souza-Kordeiru in spring 2016.

=== 2016–2017 season ===
Making their international debut as a team, Petranović/Souza-Kordeiru placed fourth at the 2016 CS Warsaw Cup in November. They finished fifth at the 2016 CS Golden Spin of Zagreb in December; 15th at the 2017 European Championships in January in Ostrava, Czech Republic; and 21st at the 2017 World Championships in March in Helsinki, Finland. They were coached by Yuri Larionov in Moscow.

=== 2017–2018 season ===
Petranović underwent an operation after injuring the meniscus in her knee and returned to the ice after three months. Due to her injury, the pair was unable to compete in September at the 2017 CS Nebelhorn Trophy, which served as the final qualification opportunity for the 2018 Winter Olympics. They returned to competition in January, placing 12th at the 2018 European Championships in Moscow. In March, they placed 21st at the 2018 World Championships in Milan, Italy. They were coached by Larionov and Dmitri Savin in Moscow.

=== 2018–2019 season ===
Coached by Savin in Moscow, Petranović/Souza-Kordeiru placed 7th at their first event of the season, the 2018 CS Lombardia Trophy. They competed at two other Challenger events of the season, the 2018 CS Nebelhorn Trophy and 2018 CS Golden Spin of Zagreb, placing eighth and seventh. They finished the season placing eighth at the 2019 European Championships and sixteenth at the 2019 World Championships.

=== 2019–2020 season ===
Petranović/Souza-Kordeiru placed twelfth at the 2019 CS Golden Spin of Zagreb and fifteenth at the 2020 European Championships. The 2020 World Championships were cancelled as a result of the COVID-19 pandemic.

=== 2020–2021 season ===
Petranović/Souza-Kordeiru placed twenty-first at the 2021 World Championships.

=== 2021–2022 season ===
Petranović/Souza-Kordeiru began the season at the 2021 CS Nebelhorn Trophy, seeking to qualify a berth at the 2022 Winter Olympics. They placed twelfth, outside of qualification. They went on to finish sixth at the Budapest Trophy and eleventh at the 2021 CS Golden Spin of Zagreb, and then sixteenth at the 2022 European Championships.

In February, Souza-Kordeiru announced his retirement from competitive figure skating, ending their partnership.

== Programs ==
=== With Souza-Kordeiru ===
Season	Short program	Free skating
2021–2022	Palladio by Karl Jenkins	Butterflies and Hurricanes by Muse
2020–2021	The Greatest Show (from The Greatest Showman) performed by Hugh Jackman	Butterflies and Hurricanes by Muse
2019–2020	I Put a Spell on You	Writing's on the Wall by Sam Smith
2018–2019	The Greatest Show (from The Greatest Showman) by Hugh Jackman	Light of the Seven (from Game of Thrones) by Ramin Djawadi; The In-Between; Imperfection by Evanescence
2016–2018	Strange Birds performed by Birdy	Happy (Woodkid Sad Remix) by Pharrell Williams; Stayin' Alive by the Bee Gees; Disco Inferno performed by The Trammps

=== With Lueck ===
Season	Short program	Free skating	Exhibition
2015–2016	Set Fire to the Rain by Adele		Feeling Good by Jennifer Hudson

=== Ladies' singles ===
Season	Short program	Free skating
2014–2015	Pearl Harbor by Hans Zimmer	November Rain by David Garrett

== Competitive highlights ==
CS: Challenger Series; JGP: Junior Grand Prix

=== Pairs with Souza-Kordeiru ===
International
Event	16–17	17–18	18–19	19–20	20–21	21–22
World Champ.	21st	21st	16th	C	21st	
European Champ.	15th	12th	8th	15th		16th
CS Golden Spin	5th		7th	12th		11th
CS Lombardia Trophy			7th			
CS Nebelhorn Trophy			8th			12th
CS Warsaw Cup	4th					
Budapest Trophy						6th
Challenge Cup		4th		8th		
Ice Star			4th			
Open Ice Mall			1st			
National
Croatian Champ.		1st	1st	1st		
TBD = Assigned; WD = Withdrew; C = Event cancelled

=== Pairs with Lueck ===
International
Event	2015–2016
CS Golden Spin of Zagreb	10th
CS Tallinn Trophy	9th
CS Warsaw Cup	9th
Bavarian Open	6th
Hellmut Seibt Memorial	5th
Lombardia Trophy	4th
Toruń Cup	7th

=== Ladies' singles ===
International: Junior
Event	14–15
JGP Croatia	30th
European Youth Olympic Festival	24th
