= Kalol =

Kalol may refer to several places in India:

- Kalol, Gandhinagar, a city in Gandhinagar district, Gujarat
  - Kalol, Gandhinagar (Vidhan Sabha constituency)
  - Kalol Junction railway station
- Kalol, Panchmahal, a town in Panchmahal district, Gujarat
  - Kalol, Panchmahal (Vidhan Sabha constituency)

== See also ==
- Karol (disambiguation)
