= Kaslo (disambiguation) =

Kaslo is a village in British Columbia, Canada.

Kaslo may also refer to:

== Places ==
- Kaslo (electoral district), a former provincial riding in Canada (1903–1920)
- Kaslo Airport, an airport in Canada
- Kaslo River, a river in Canada

== See also ==
- Karlo (name)
- Kaslo-Slocan, a former provincial riding in Canada (1924–1963)
- Nelson-Kaslo, a former provincial riding in Canada (1903–1912)
- Kaslo and Slocan Railway, a former railway in Canada
