= Karol, Gujarat =

Karol
- village
- Country: India
- State: Gujarat
- District: Surendranagar
- Elevation: 63 m (207 ft)

Population (2011 census)
  - Total: 3,320

Languages
  - Official: Gujarati
- Time zone: UTC+5:30 (IST)
- PIN: 363410

See Karol for namesake persons

Karol is a village and former minor Rajput princely state on the Saurashtra peninsula in the Indian state of Gujarat.

== History ==
The princely state in Jhalawar prant was ruled by Jhala Rajput Chieftains. It comprised two major centres; Karol and Vadekhan villages.

In 1901 the population totaled 981. State Revenue in 1903-04 yielded approximately Rs. 11,000, 796 of which was paid to the British and Junagadh State.

Karol is the major village of Limbdi and was built by Zala Amarsinhjibapu. The name was taken from Kalbherav Dev, as suggested by Zala Amarsinhjibapu.

== Geography ==
Karol is located near Limbdi in Surendranagar district. It is surrounded by extensive acreage and borders Laliyad, Sauka, Pandri, Limbdi, Khandiya, Mojidad, Borna and Bhrugupur.

Karol connects by road and train.

The Chuda railway station is 2 km away. A government bus serves Karol from the Limbdi bus station.

Narmada canal passes near the village, providing water for drinking and agriculture. Karol has a large lake and the main road separates the lake from the village.

The roads in the village are made by RCC.

An underwater rubbish/garbage system serves the village.

== Demographics ==
Karol has a population of 3,320, of which 1,708 are males while 1,612 are females as per Population Census 2011.

The population of children age 0-6 is 332.

The sex ratio is 944, higher than Gujarat State average of 919. The child sex ratio is 795, lower than Gujarat average of 890.

In 2011, the literacy rate was 81.12% compared to 78.03 % of Gujarat. Male literacy stands at 94.48 % while the female literacy rate was 67.24%.
