= Karolis =

- Gender: Male

Origin
- Region of origin: Lithuania

Other names
- Related names: Karl, Carl, Charles

Karolis is a Lithuanian masculine given name. It is a cognate of the North Germanic names Karl and Carl and the French and English Charles.

Karolis may refer to:

- Karolis Babkauskas (born 1991), Lithuanian basketball player
- Karolis Bauža (born 1987), Lithuanian judoka
- Karolis Chvedukas (born 1991), Lithuanian footballer
- Karolis Giedraitis (born 1998), Lithuanian basketball player
- Karolis Girulis (born 1986), Lithuanian sports shooter
- Karolis Jasaitis (born 1982), Lithuanian footballer
- Karolis Jukšta (born 2003), Lithuanian chess player
- Karolis Laukžemis (born 1992), Lithuanian footballer
- Karolis Lukošiūnas (born 1997), Lithuanian basketball player
- Karolis Navickas (born 1990), Lithuanian rugby union player
- Karolis Petrukonis (born 1987), Lithuanian basketball player
- Karolis Požela (1896–1926), Lithuanian communist revolutionary
- Karolis Skinkys (born 1989), Lithuanian football executive and sporting director
- Karolis Uzėla (born 2000), Lithuanian footballer
- Karolis Zlatkauskas (born 1985), Lithuanian biathlete

== See also ==
- Karoli (name)
- Karolos
