= Kahlo (surname) =

Kahlo is a German surname. Notable people with the surname include:

- Cristina Kahlo (1908–1964), daughter of Guillermo and sister of Frida Kahlo
- Frida Kahlo (1907–1954), Mexican artist
- Guillermo Kahlo (1871–1941), German-Mexican architect and photographer, father of Frida and Cristina

== See also ==
- Karlo (name)
