= Karlo =

Karlo may refer to:

- Karlo (name)
- Karlo Island, of the Indian union territory of Andaman and Nicobar Islands
- Karlö, the Swedish name of Hailuoto, Finland

== See also ==
- Carlo (disambiguation)
- Karlos (disambiguation)
- Karly, a given name

|geo
