= Velký Karlov =

- Municipality
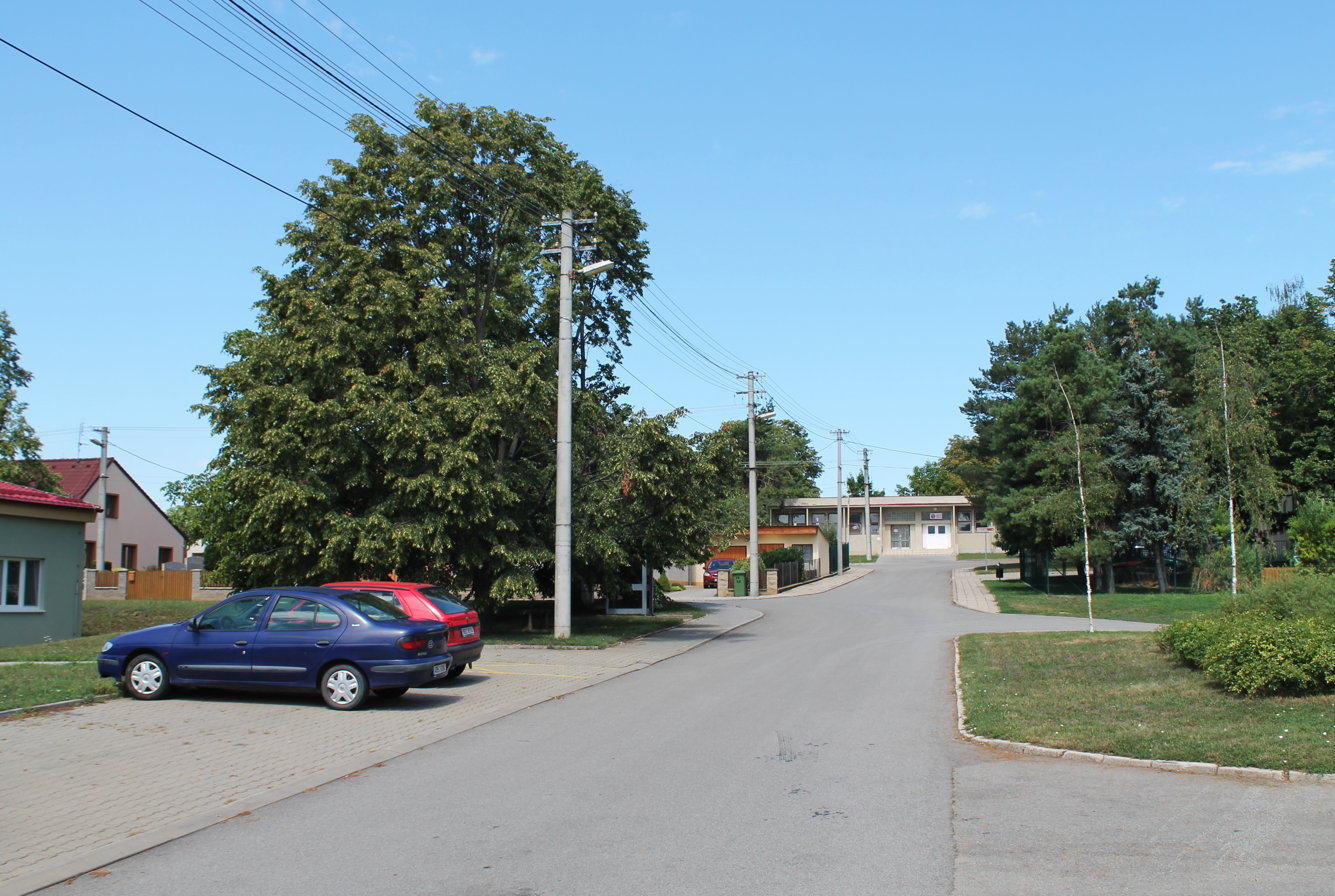
- Centre of Velký Karlov

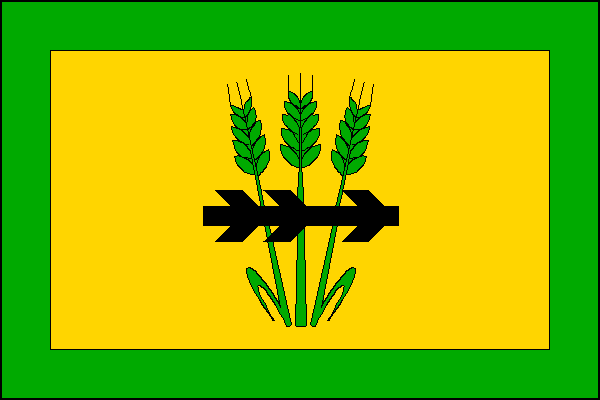
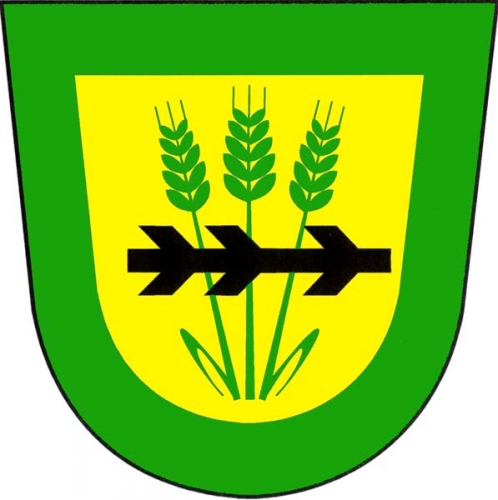
- Flag Coat of arms

- Location in the Czech Republic
- Coordinates: 48°48′16″N 16°18′20″E
- Country: Czech Republic
- Region: South Moravian
- District: Znojmo
- Founded: 1965

Area
  - Total: 13.49 km^{2} (5.21 sq mi)
- Elevation: 206 m (676 ft)

Population (2026-01-01)
  - Total: 400
  - Density: 30/km^{2} (77/sq mi)
- Time zone: UTC+1 (CET)
  - Summer (DST): UTC+2 (CEST)
- Postal code: 671 28
- Website: www.velkykarlov.cz

Velký Karlov is a municipality and village in Znojmo District in the South Moravian Region of the Czech Republic. It has about 400 inhabitants.

Velký Karlov lies approximately 22 kilometres (14 mi) east of Znojmo, 50 km (31 mi) south-west of Brno, and 199 km (124 mi) south-east of Prague.

== History ==
Velký Karlov is among the youngest villages in the country. A farm called Velký Karlov was built here in 1950. First houses were built in 1953. The municipality of Velký Karlov was established on 26 November 1971.

== Demographics ==
Historical population
Year	Pop.	±%
1950	–	—
1961	315	—
1970	431	+36.8%
1980	492	+14.2%
1991	474	−3.7%
2001	431	−9.1%
2011	408	−5.3%
2021	377	−7.6%
Source: Censuses
