= Karow =

Karow or Karów may refer to:

- Karow, Mecklenburg-Vorpommern, Germany
- Karow, Saxony-Anhalt, Germany
- Karow (Berlin), a district in the borough of Pankow in Berlin
- Karów, Poland
- Marty Karow (1904-1986), All-American college football player and professional baseball player

== See also ==
- Karlow (name)
