= Boris Karlov =

Bulgarian accordionist (1924–1964)

Boris Karlov (Bulgarian: Борис Карлов; August 11, 1924 – December 14, 1964) was a Bulgarian accordionist. He was born in Sofia into a Romani family. His father Karlo Aliev conducted an orchestra that was often heard on radio Sofia.

At an early age Boris was already passionate about folk music, played first on the ocarina and later on the tambura in his father's orchestra. Here he acquired a feeling for the harmonic structure of Bulgarian music. At the age of twelve, Karlov began to play the accordion, beginning with a simple 48-bass Hohner instrument, and progressing to a 120-bass. Eventually he had an Italian Scandalli accordion custom-made for him.

From 1950 to 1960, Karlov was in demand not only in Bulgaria, but also in Yugoslavia and Austria. He had a busy concert schedule and favourable reviews. Karlov developed a style of playing which was new on the accordion. Based on generally short, simple, but fast musical phrases, frequently in the irregular rhythms that were originally played on traditional Bulgarian instruments such as the gaida (bagpipe) and kaval (end-blown flute), he innovated a rondo form where the special character of Bulgarian music nevertheless remained.

He died, still on tour, in Kraljevo, of a kidney infection.
