= Wesley (footballer, born 1989) =

Brazilian footballer

Personal information
- Full name: Wesley Karlos Piedade
- Date of birth: April 27, 1989 (age 37)
- Place of birth: São Paulo, Brazil
- Height: 1.93 m (6 ft 4 in)
- Position: Goalkeeper

Team information
- Current team: Galícia

Youth career
- 2007: Galícia

Senior career*
Years	Team	Apps	(Gls)
2007	Galícia	0	(0)
- * Club domestic league appearances and goals

Wesley Karlos Piedade (born April 27, 1989, in São Paulo), is a Brazilian goalkeeper. He currently plays for Galícia.

== Contract ==
- 1 July 2007 to 30 July 2010

== See also ==
- Football in Brazil
- List of football clubs in Brazil
