= Pierre Karlów =

Iranian footballer

Personal information
- Full name: Pierre Karlów
- Place of birth: Poland
- Position: Goalkeeper

Senior career*
Years	Team	Apps	(Gls)
1945–1956	Taj Iran		

International career
1948	Iran	1	(0)
- * Club domestic league appearances and goals

Pierre Karlów (Persian: پیر کارلو) was a footballer who played as a goalkeeper. Karlów was one of Polish immigrants to Iran due to World War II. He is the very first foreigner to play for Esteghlal. He played for Iran national football team against Turkey.
