= Karoo (disambiguation) =

The Karoo, sometimes also Karroo, is a semi-desert region of South Africa.

Karoo may also refer to:

In earth sciences:

- Karoo-Ferrar, a major geologic province which mostly covers South Africa and Antarctica
- Karoo Supergroup, a stratigraphic unit in sub-Saharan Africa
- Karoo Ice Age, the second major ice age of the Phanerozoic Eon

In Astronomy:

- Karoo (crater), an impact crater on Asteroid 253 Mathilde

Places:

- Karoo National Park, in the Western Cape, South Africa
- Karoo District Municipality, in the Northern Cape, South Africa
- Central Karoo District Municipality, in the Western Cape, South Africa
- Karoo Hoogland Local Municipality, in the Northern Cape, South Africa

Birds

- Karoo chat
- Karoo eremomela
- Karoo korhaan
- Karoo prinia
- Karoo scrub robin

Plants

- Vachellia karroo, also called the Karoo thorn

Companies

- Karoo (internet service provider), an Internet Service Provider in the United Kingdom

Literature

- Saul Karoo, main character and narrator in Karoo, posthumous novel by Steve Tesich, published in 1998.

== See also ==
- Karlo (name)
