= Karlo Weissmann =

Croatian physician

Dr. Karlo Weissmann
- Born: 14 February 1890; Virovitica, Kingdom of Croatia-Slavonia, Austria-Hungary
- Died: 1953 (aged 62–63); Osijek, PR Croatia, FPR Yugoslavia
- Education: Medical University of Vienna
- Relatives: Jakob and Adele (née Levald) Weissmann (parents); Herman Weissman (brother)

Dr. Karlo Weissmann (14 February 1890 – 1953) was a Croatian physician and founder of the first sanatorium in Osijek.

Weissmann was born in Virovitica to a Jewish family on 14 February 1890. He completed elementary school in Osijek and Gymnasium education in Zagreb. Weissmann graduated from the Medical University of Vienna. During World War I he was recruited in the Austro-Hungarian Army and was stationed in Albania. In 1921 Weissmann finished specialization at the Charité - Universitätsmedizin Berlin. Upon completing specialization he returned to Osijek where he led an anti-tuberculosis dispensary. Soon after he co-founded, with Dr. Julijo Bathory, the first sanatorium in Osijek, "Weissmann-Bathory".

Weissmann was a long time member of the Jewish community Osijek. On 20 April 1926 Weissmann and several others Jewish athletes founded the "Rowing sport club Bar Kohba", which he also presided. During World War II, as a Jew, he was persecuted and forced to leave Osijek. He escaped to Jastrebarsko where he worked as physician from 1942 to 1945. After the war Weissmann returned to Osijek where he died from a heart attack. He was buried at the Jewish cemetery Osijek.

== Bibliography ==
- Kraus, Ognjen (1998). Dva stoljeća povijesti i kulture Židova u Zagrebu i Hrvatskoj. Zagreb: Židovska općina Zagreb. ISBN 953-96836-2-9.
- Živaković-Kerže, Zlata (2005). Židovi u Osijeku (1918.-1941.). Osijek: Židovska općina Osijek – Tiskara Pauk d.o.o., Cerna. ISBN 953-6659-22-0.
