= Karlov (surname) =

Karlov (Cyrillic: Карлов) is a Slavic masculine surname that originates from the given name Carl. Its feminine counterpart is Karlova. Notable people with the surname include:

- Andrei Karlov (1954–2016), Russian diplomat
- Boris Karlov (1924–1964), Bulgarian accordionist
- Georgy Karlov (born 1971), Russian politician
- Larysa Karlova (born 1958), Ukrainian handball player
- Sonia Karlov (1908–?), American dancer and actress
- Uğur Rıfat Karlova (born 1980), Turkish-Taiwanese stand-up comedian, actor, TV host and writer
- Yevgeny Karlov

== See also ==
- Karlov (disambiguation)
- Karloff
- Karlow (name)
