= Croatian Figure Skating Championships =

Recurring figure skating competition

- Status: Active
- Genre: National championships
- Frequency: Annual
- Venue: Klizalište Velesajam; Zagreb Fair
- Location: Zagreb
- Country: Croatia
- Inaugurated: 1992
- Organizer: Croatian Skating Federation

The Croatian Figure Skating Championships (Croatian: Prvenstvo Hrvatske u umjetničkom klizanju) are an annual figure skating competition organized by the Croatian Skating Federation (Croatian: Hrvatski klizački savez) to crown the national champions of Croatia. Croatia emerged as an independent nation when it seceded from Yugoslavia in June 1991. The first championships held after Croatian independence took place in Zagreb in March 1992. Championships are currently held at the Klizalište Velesajam in Zagreb.

Medals are awarded in men's singles, women's singles, and pair skating at the senior and junior levels, although each discipline may not necessarily be held every year due to a lack of participants. Many early Croatian skaters had been champions of Yugoslavia before Croatian independence; siblings Tomislav and Željka Čižmešija had each won multiple Yugoslav Championship titles before becoming Croatian champions. Jari Kessler and Boris Martinec are tied for winning the most Croatian Championship titles in men's singles (with five each), while Mirna Librić holds the record in women's singles (with eight). Lana Petranović and Antonio Souza-Kordeiru hold the record in pair skating (with three); however, they are the only pairs team Croatia has had compete at the senior level.

== Senior medalists ==
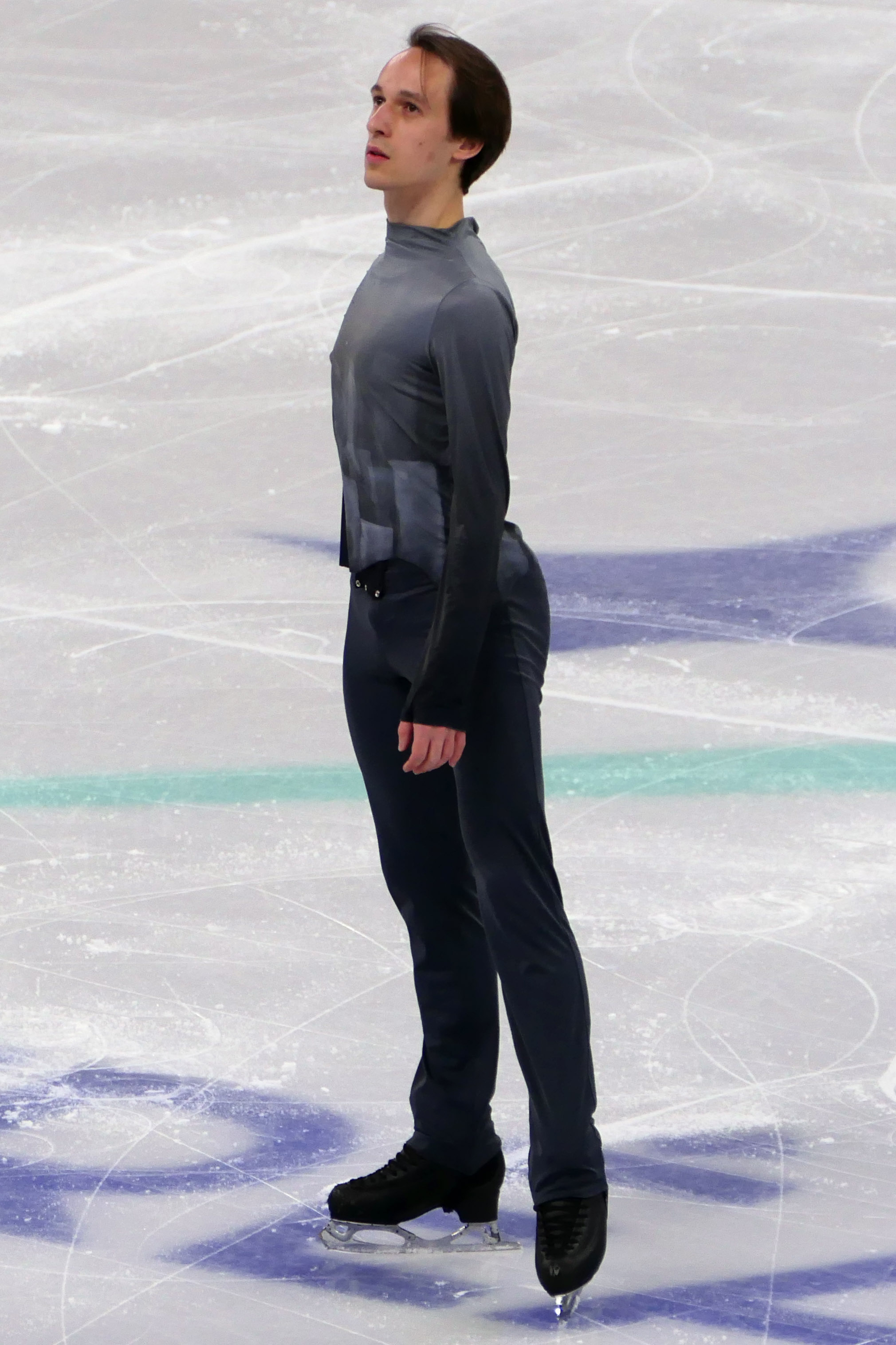
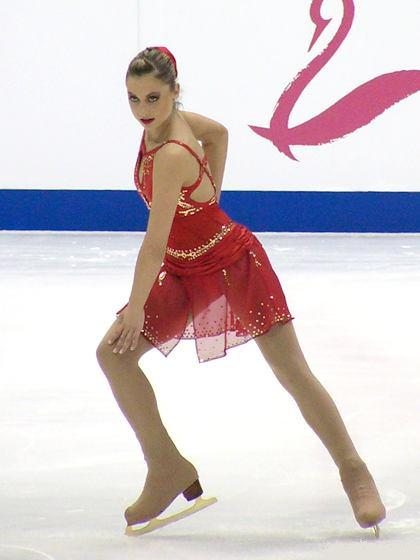
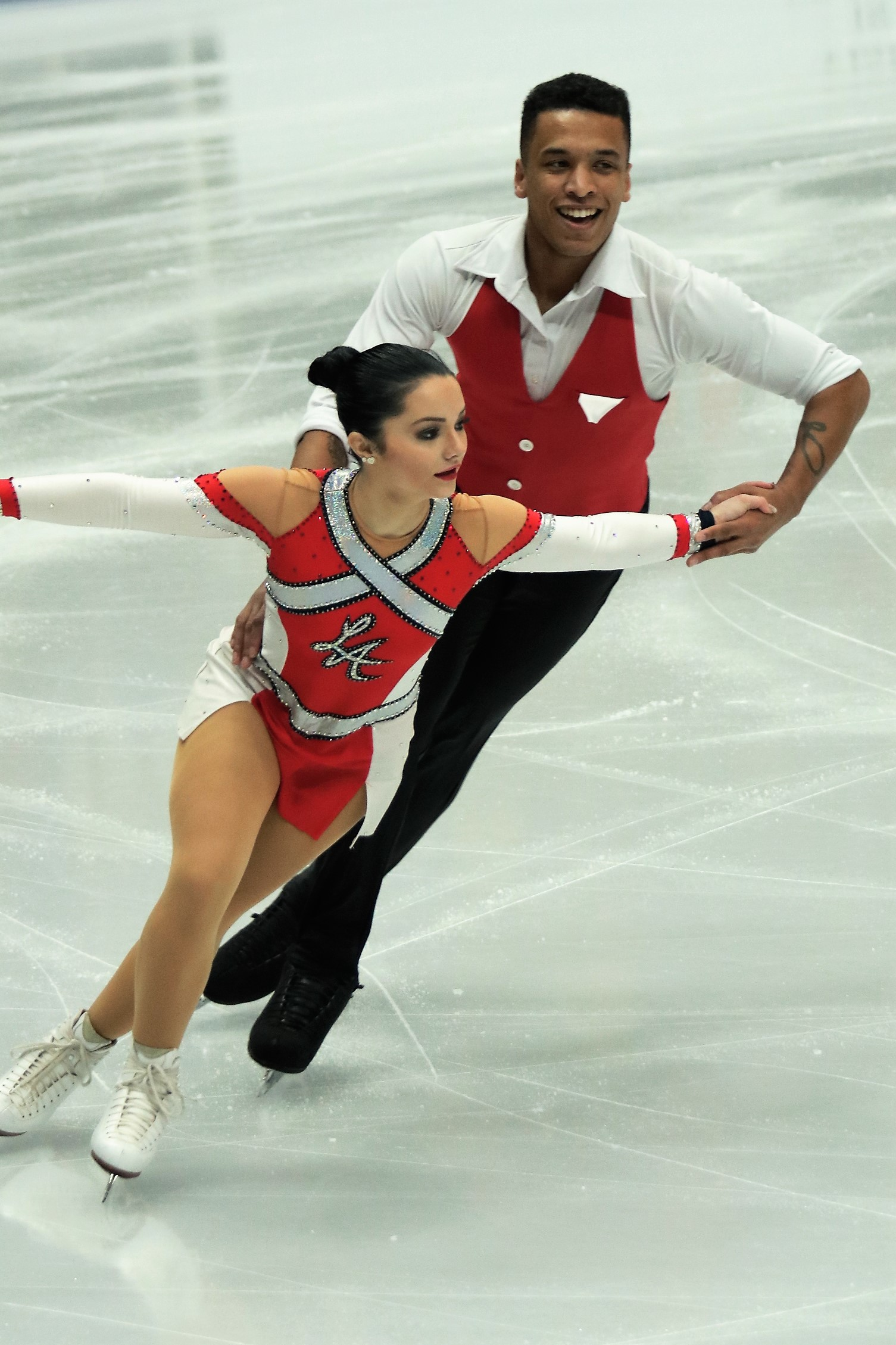
From left to right: Jari Kessler, five-time Croatian champion in men's singles; Idora Hegel, seven-time Croatian champion in women's singles; and Lana Petranović and Antonio Souza-Kordeiru, three-time Croatian champions in pair skating

=== Men's singles ===
Senior men's event medalists
Year	Location	Gold	Silver	Bronze	Ref.
1992	Zagreb	Tomislav Čižmešija	Zoran Marković	Joško Cerovac	
1993	Zagreb	Tomislav Čižmešija	Zoran Marković	Joško Cerovac	
1994	Zagreb	Tomislav Čižmešija	No other competitors		
1995	Zagreb	No men's competitors			
1996	Zagreb	Zoran Marković	No other competitors		
1997	Zagreb	No men's competitors			
1998	Zagreb	Zoran Marković	No other competitors		
1999	Zagreb	No men's competitors			
2000	Zagreb	Karlo Požgajčić	No other competitors listed		
2001	Zagreb	Michael Bahorić	Karlo Požgajčić	No other competitors	
2002	Zagreb	Michael Bahorić	Karlo Požgajčić	No other competitors	
2003–05	Zagreb	No men's competitors			
2006	Zagreb	No competition held			
2007	Zagreb	Boris Martinec	Josip Gluhak	No other competitors	
2008	Zagreb	Boris Martinec	Josip Gluhak	No other competitors	
2009	Zagreb	Boris Martinec	Josip Gluhak	No other competitors	
2010	Zagreb	Boris Martinec	No other competitors		
2011	Zagreb	Boris Martinec	No other competitors		
2012	Zagreb	Josip Gluhak	No other competitors		
2013	Zagreb	Josip Gluhak	No other competitors		
2014	Zagreb	Josip Gluhak	No other competitors		
2015	Zagreb	Josip Gluhak	Steven Spencer Baker	No other competitors	
2016	Zagreb	Steven Spencer Baker	No other competitors		
2017	Zagreb	Tomislav Mikulandrić	No other competitors		
2018	Zagreb	Nicholas Vrdoljak	No other competitors		
2019	Zagreb	Charles Katanović	No other competitors		
2020	Zagreb	Jari Kessler	No other competitors		
2021–22	Zagreb	No men's competitors			
2023	Zagreb	Jari Kessler	No other competitors		
2024	Zagreb	Jari Kessler	No other competitors		
2025	Zagreb	Jari Kessler	No other competitors		
2026	Zagreb	Jari Kessler	No other competitors		

=== Women's singles ===
Senior women's event medalists
Year	Location	Gold	Silver	Bronze	Ref.
1992	Zagreb	Željka Čižmešija	Ivana Jakupčević	Melita Juratek	
1993	Zagreb	Melita Juratek	Ivana Jakupčević	Ana Ivančić	
1994	Zagreb	Tamara Panjkret	Ivana Jakupčević	Ana Ivančić	
1995	Zagreb	Ivana Jakupčević	Ana Ivančić	Melita Juratek	
1996	Zagreb	Ivana Jakupčević	Ana Ivančić	Tamara Panjkret	
1997	Zagreb	Ivana Jakupčević	Ana Ivančić	Danka Pivac	
1998	Zagreb	Ivana Jakupčević	Ana Ivančić	Tamara Panjkret	
1999	Zagreb	Ivana Jakupčević	Tamara Panjkret	No other competitors	
2000	Zagreb	Idora Hegel	No other competitors listed		
2001	Zagreb	Idora Hegel	Ines Pavleković	Željka Krizmanić	
2002	Zagreb	Idora Hegel	Tamara Panjkret	No other competitors	
2003	Zagreb	Idora Hegel	Nataša Bahat	No other competitors	
2004	Zagreb	Idora Hegel	Željka Krizmanić	Helena Pozojević	
2005	Zagreb	Idora Hegel	No other competitors		
2006	Zagreb	No competition held			
2007	Zagreb	Idora Hegel	Željka Krizmanić	Mirna Librić	
2008	Zagreb	Mirna Librić	Maria Dikanović	Franka Vugec	
2009	Zagreb	Mirna Librić	Maria Dikanović	Franka Vugec	
2010	Zagreb	Mirna Librić	Franka Vugec	Maria Dikanović	
2011	Zagreb	Mirna Librić	Franka Vugec	Mateja Bursić	
2012	Zagreb	Mirna Librić	Nika Zafran	Petra Jurić	
2013	Zagreb	Mirna Librić	Nika Zafran	Petra Jurić	
2014	Zagreb	Mirna Librić	Petra Jurić	Mateja Bursić	
2015	Zagreb	Mirna Librić	Mateja Bursić	Ema Lipovšćak	
2016	Zagreb	Tena Čopor	Christina Baker	Valentina Mikac	
2017	Zagreb	Tena Čopor	Mihaela Štimac Rojtinić	Claudia Krizmanić	
2018	Zagreb	Patricia Skopancic	Katarina Kitarović	Mihaela Štimac Rojtinić	
2019	Zagreb	Hana Cvijanović	Patricia Skopancić	Mihaela Štimac Rojtinić	
2020	Zagreb	Hana Cvijanović	Patricia Skopancić	Mihaela Štimac Rojtinić	
2021	Zagreb	Karla Coralić	Stela Ristić	Klara Krmpotić	
2022	Zagreb	Hana Cvijanović	Patricia Skopancić	Lorena Cizmek	
2023	Zagreb	Hana Cvijanović	Lorena Cizmek	Luce Stipanicev	
2024	Zagreb	Hana Cvijanović	Lorena Cizmek	Luce Stipanicev	
2025	Zagreb	Hana Cvijanović	Lorena Cizmek	Luce Stipanicev	
2026	Zagreb	Meri Marinac	Lorena Cizmek	Ema Vuković	

=== Pairs ===
Senior pairs event medalists
Year	Location	Gold	Silver	Bronze	Ref.
No pairs competitors prior to 2017
2017	Zagreb	Lana Petranović; Antonio Souza-Kordeiru	No other competitors		
2018	Zagreb	Lana Petranović; Antonio Souza-Kordeiru	No other competitors		
2019	Zagreb	No pairs competitors			
2020	Zagreb	Lana Petranović; Antonio Souza-Kordeiru	No other competitors		
No pairs competitors since 2020

== Junior medalists ==
While junior-level championships were held in Croatia prior to 2008, this is earliest for which full results have been documented.

=== Men's singles ===
Junior men's event medalists
Year	Location	Gold	Silver	Bronze	Ref.
2008	Zagreb	Ivor Mikolčevič	No other competitors		
2009	Zagreb	Ivor Mikolčevič	Borna Blagojevič	No other competitors	
2010	Zagreb	Ivor Mikolčevič	No other competitors		
2011	Zagreb	No junior men's competitors			
2012	Zagreb	Mislav Blagojevič	No other competitors		
2013	Zagreb	Steven Spencer Baker	Mislav Blagojevič	No other competitors	
2014	Zagreb	Steven Spencer Baker	Petar Cetinic	Tomislav Mikulandrić	
2015	Zagreb	Tomislav Mikulandrić	No other competitors		
2016	Zagreb	Tomislav Mikulandrić	Josip Skalec	No other competitors	
2017	Zagreb	Josip Skalec	No other competitors		
2018	Zagreb	Charles Katanovič	No other competitors		
2019	Zagreb	Andrej Galjar	No other competitors		
2020	Zagreb	Andrej Galjar	No other competitors		
2021	Zagreb	Andrej Galjar	No other competitors		
2022–23	Zagreb	No junior men's competitors			
2024	Zagreb	Fran Petrovič	No other competitors		
2025	Zagreb	Petar Miklenić	Fran Petrovič	No other competitors	
2026	Zagreb	No junior men's competitors			

=== Women's singles ===
Junior women's event medalists
Year	Location	Gold	Silver	Bronze	Ref.
2008	Zagreb	Monia Aleksić	Mateja Bursić	Nika Zec	
2009	Zagreb	Petra Jurić	Ema Lipovšćak	Monia Aleksić	
2010	Zagreb	Petra Jurić	Ema Lipovšćak	Nika Zafran	
2011	Zagreb	Petra Jurić	Nika Zafran	Monia Aleksić	
2012	Zagreb	Valentina Mikac	Barbara Nicol Kukla	Izabela Cerkuc	
2013	Zagreb	Valentina Mikac	Ivona Repe	Izabela Cerkuc	
2014	Zagreb	Valentina Mikac	Tena Čopor	Antonija Banović	
2015	Zagreb	Tena Čopor	Valentina Mikac	Antonija Banović	
2016	Zagreb	Katarina Kitarović	Patricia Skopančić	Mihaela Štimac Rojtinić	
2017	Zagreb	Hana Cvijanović	Katarina Kitarović	Patricia Skopančić	
2018	Zagreb	Hana Cvijanović	Marta Nedved	Lucija Simon	
2019	Zagreb	Hana Kosić	Josipa Jagodić	Lucija Simon	
2020	Zagreb	Hana Kosić	Luce Stipanicev	Lorena Cizmek	
2021	Zagreb	Lorena Cizmek	Luce Stipanicev	Ema Vuković	
2022	Zagreb	Nevia Ana Medic	Meri Marinac	Tonka Zitković	
2023	Zagreb	Meri Marinac	Lena Cusak	Nevia Ana Medic	
2024	Zagreb	Lena Cusak	Megy Filipović	Bruna Baric	
2025	Zagreb	Lena Cusak	Klara Cusak	Meri Marinac	
2026	Zagreb	Paula Kasnar	Klara Cusak	Tara Plahutar	

=== Pairs ===
Junior pairs event medalists
Year	Location	Gold	Silver	Bronze	Ref.
2008–12	Zagreb	No junior pairs competitors			
2013	Zagreb	Lana Petranović; Mislav Blagojević	No other competitors		
2014	Zagreb	No junior pairs competitors			
2015	Zagreb	Christina Baker; Steven Spencer Baker	Ivona Horvat; Tomislav Mikulandrić	No other competitors	
No junior pairs competitors since 2015

== Records ==
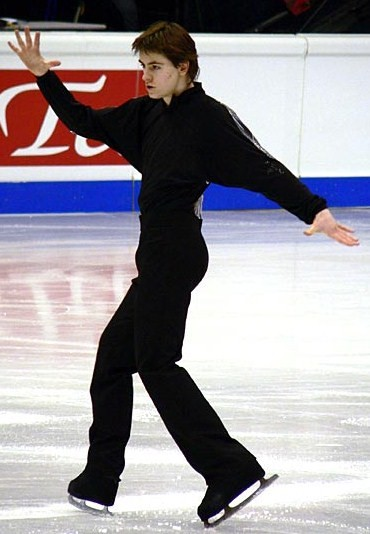
Boris Martinec won five Croatian Championship titles in men's singles.

Records
Discipline	Most championship titles			
Discipline	Skater(s)	No.	Years	Ref.
Men's singles	Jari Kessler	5	2020; 2023–26	
Men's singles	Boris Martinec	5	2004–05; 2007–11	
Women's singles	Mirna Librić	8	2008–15	
Pairs	Lana Petranović; Antonio Souza-Kordeiru	3	2017–18; 2020	
