= Karlo Kacharava =

Georgian artist (1964–1994)

- Born: February 7, 1964; Samtredia, Georgia
- Died: April 9, 1994 (aged 30); Tbilisi, Georgia
- Education: Tbilisi State Academy of Arts

Karlo Kacharava (Georgian: კარლო კაჭარავა; February 7, 1964–April 9, 1994) was a Georgian artist, poet, essayist and art critic born in Samtredia. In 1986 he graduated from the Tbilisi State Academy of Arts and from 1986 to his death in 1994 he worked at the Giorgi Chubinashvili Institute of Art History. Through his writing for publications such as "Literature and Art," for which he was also an editor, Kacharava acted as a bridge between the Georgian artists of his generation and the Western literary and art worlds. Although he was the leader and theorist of the "Archivarius" and "X Floor" group of artists, he did not have a solo exhibition until 1994, organized posthumously at the National Gallery, Tbilisi. In 1997 he was the first researcher to be posthumously awarded the Giorgi Chubinashvili State Prize for his contribution to Georgian art history.

== Career ==
In 1984, while still a student, Kacharava formed the "Archivarius" group with Mamuka Tsetskhladze, Gia Loria and Goga Maghlakelidze. The name was derived from a character in the German Romantic novella The Golden Pot by Ernst Theodore Hoffman. The group's first exhibition was held at Gia Loria's house and the group's manifesto was written by Kacharava.

In 1986, in a small room on the tenth floor of the Tbilisi State Academy of Arts, a number of young artists formed an avant-garde group hereinafter referred to as the "X Floor." In addition to the "Archivarius" artists, the group included: Mamuka Japaridze, Niko Lomashvili, Temur Iakobashvili, Niko Tsetskhladze, Oleg Timchenko, Guram Tsibakhashvili, Gia Dolidze, Zurab Sumbadze, Maia Tsetskhladze, Lia Shvelidze and others. Kacharava was the sole theorist of the group. In the same year, the group's first exhibition was organized in a caravanserai by artist Gia Bugadze.

Kacharava graduated from the Art Academy in 1986 and was drafted immediately into the army. He spent only a few months in the Siberian city of Mirny, returning to Tbilisi just seven months later. In the same year he started working at the Institute of Georgian Art History, Department of Modern and Contemporary Art, where he worked for the rest of his life.

In 1987, the "X Floor" group moved to a studio in the Marjanishvili Theater, where Mamuka Tsetskhladze worked as a decorator. Later this period (1987-91) was called the "Marjanishvili Period." The exhibitions, rallies, and happenings held in Tbilisi in May-October 1988 became an important event in the history of Georgian art for their direct and participatory engagement with the viewer. The group was known to hold exhibitions in non-traditional places, such as the underground passage of First Republic Square. The "X Floor" group went on to exhibit in Western Europe, including in East Berlin, Munich, Cologne, Narva, and Kassel.

In October 1993, Kacharava left for Moscow. The artist was struck in the back of the head with a heavy object by a robber, causing him to be treated for a mild concussion. In 1994, the artist returned to Tbilisi. Suddenly at the end of March, he suffered from an aneurism. Despite two brain surgeries, Kacharava died of an aneurism on April 9, 1994, at the age of 30. The artist left unfinished his final work, "The Art of Darkness," which he painted for 11 days in the dark by candlelight.

== Legacy ==
Only after Kacharava's death were solo exhibitions organized both in Georgia and abroad. In 1997, Kacharava was the first researcher to be posthumously awarded the Giorgi Chubinashvili State Prize for his contribution to Georgian art history.

In 1999, an exhibition of Kacharava's work was held at the Joyce Goldstein Gallery in New York. Jonathan Goodman, a critic for Art in America, wrote: "The Georgian artist and critic Karlo Kacharava seems to have been a force of nature. Although he died young–at the age of 30 in 1994–he left behind a huge body of work, both as a writer and painter: two major monographs, 70 unpublished articles, 1,200 paintings and countless drawings .... Very much aware of the marginal role Georgia has played in modern art–he wrote that "in the contemporary art world, Georgia does not exist"–Kacharava worked assiduously during his short life both to educate the world about Georgia's artists and to bring news of the outside world to his own culture."

A volume of collected writing and poetry was published in 2006 by Otar Karalashvili.
