= Karlov (Žďár nad Sázavou District) =

- Municipality
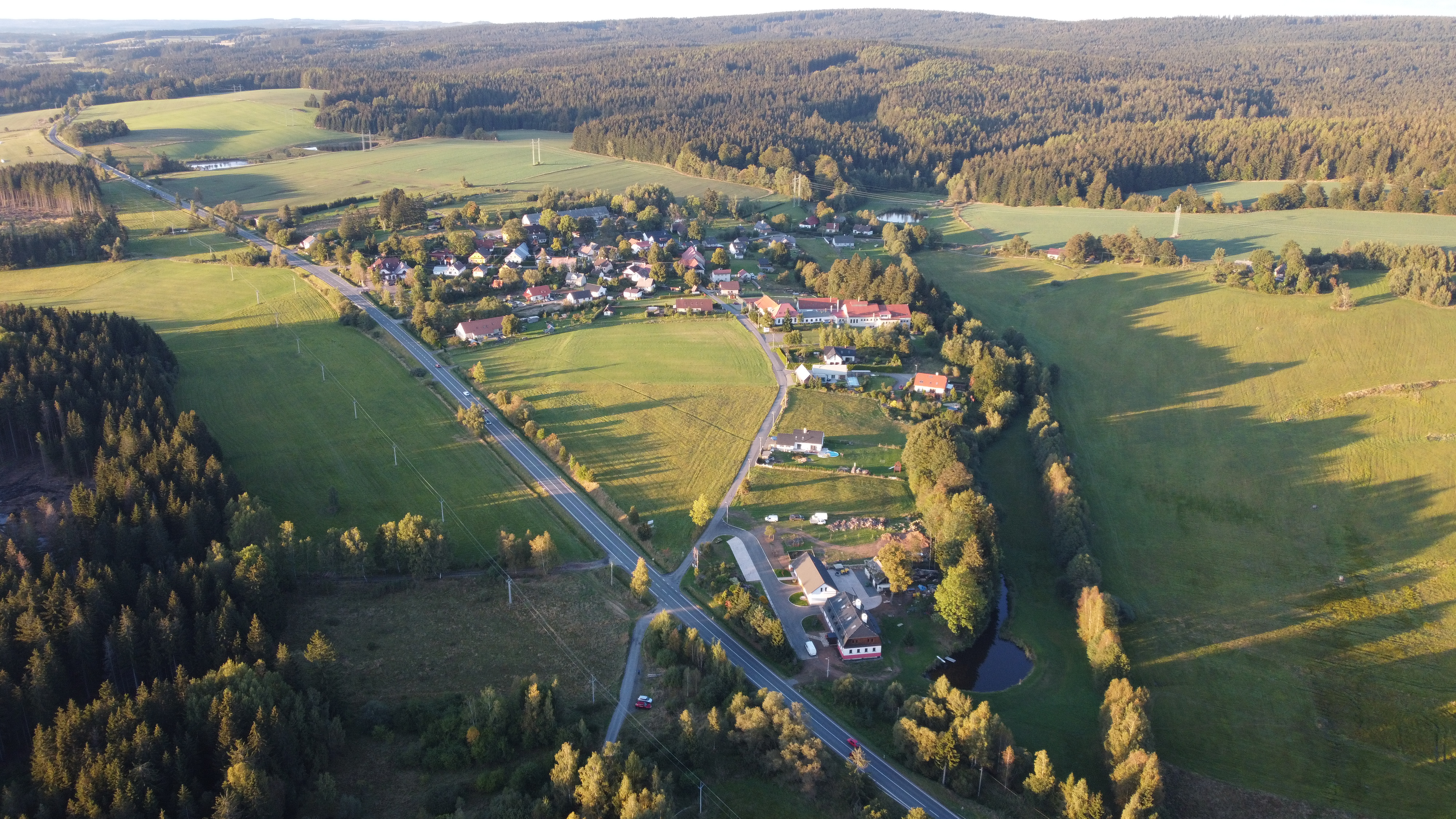
- Aerial view

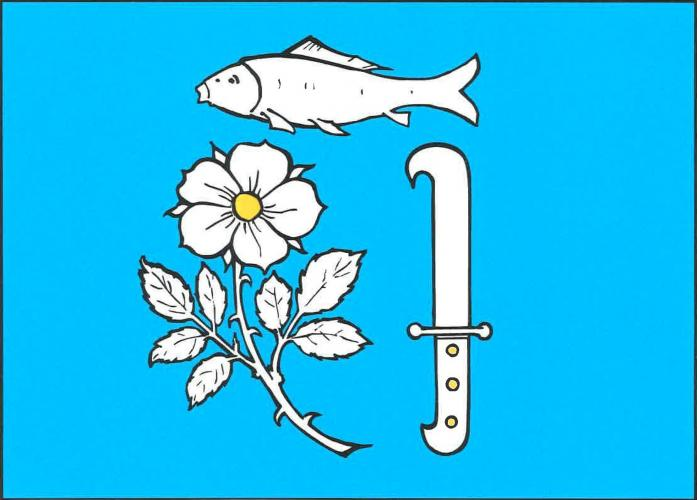
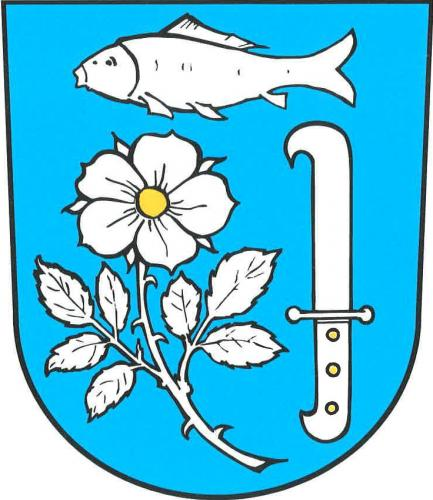
- Flag Coat of arms

- Location in the Czech Republic
- Coordinates: 49°38′49″N 15°54′52″E
- Country: Czech Republic
- Region: Vysočina
- District: Žďár nad Sázavou
- First mentioned: 1457

Area
  - Total: 3.04 km^{2} (1.17 sq mi)
- Elevation: 636 m (2,087 ft)

Population (2026-01-01)
  - Total: 123
  - Density: 40.5/km^{2} (105/sq mi)
- Time zone: UTC+1 (CET)
  - Summer (DST): UTC+2 (CEST)
- Postal code: 592 21
- Website: www.obeckarlov.cz

Karlov is a municipality and village in Žďár nad Sázavou District in the Vysočina Region of the Czech Republic. It has about 100 inhabitants.

Karlov lies approximately 10 kilometres (6 mi) north of Žďár nad Sázavou, 37 km (23 mi) north-east of Jihlava, and 118 km (73 mi) south-east of Prague.

== Demographics ==
Historical population
| Year | Pop. | ±% |
|---|---|---|
| 1869 | 291 | — |
| 1880 | 281 | −3.4% |
| 1890 | 286 | +1.8% |
| 1900 | 257 | −10.1% |
| 1910 | 248 | −3.5% |
| 1921 | 235 | −5.2% |
| 1930 | 215 | −8.5% |
| 1950 | 182 | −15.3% |
| 1961 | 167 | −8.2% |
| 1970 | 128 | −23.4% |
| 1980 | 90 | −29.7% |
| 1991 | 69 | −23.3% |
| 2001 | 80 | +15.9% |
| 2011 | 93 | +16.3% |
| 2021 | 109 | +17.2% |
Source: Censuses
