= Karlova Studánka =

- Municipality
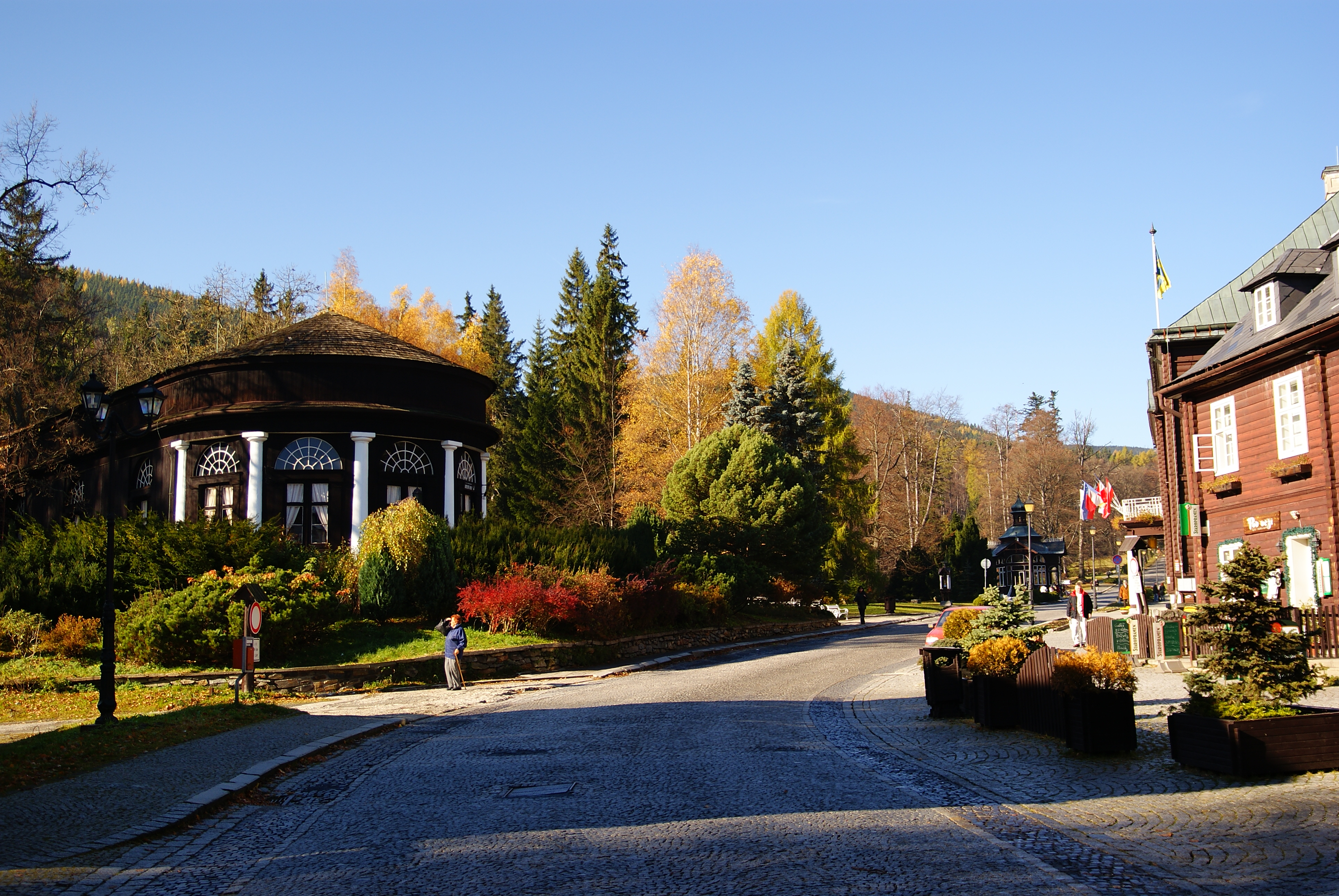
- Centre of Karlova Studánka

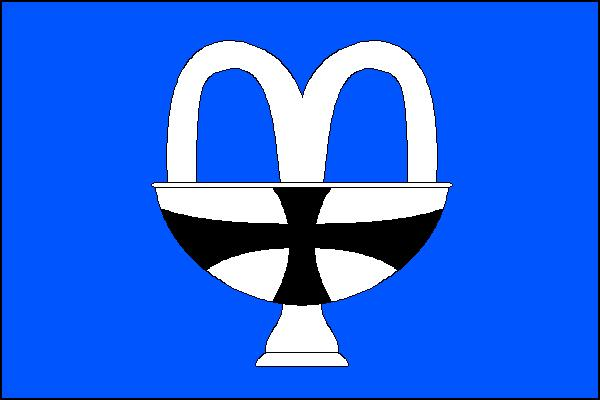
- Flag Coat of arms

- Location in the Czech Republic
- Coordinates: 50°4′23″N 17°18′25″E
- Country: Czech Republic
- Region: Moravian-Silesian
- District: Bruntál
- First mentioned: 1554

Area
  - Total: 1.55 km^{2} (0.60 sq mi)
- Elevation: 775 m (2,543 ft)

Population (2026-01-01)
  - Total: 170
  - Density: 110/km^{2} (280/sq mi)
- Time zone: UTC+1 (CET)
  - Summer (DST): UTC+2 (CEST)
- Postal code: 793 24
- Website: www.kstudanka.cz

Karlova Studánka (German: Bad Karlsbrunn) is a spa municipality and village in Bruntál District in the Moravian-Silesian Region of the Czech Republic. It has about 200 inhabitants. The village is well preserved and protected as a village monument zone.

== Etymology ==
Both the Czech name and the older German name mean "Charles' Spring".

== Geography ==
Karlova Studánka is located about 13 kilometres (8 mi) northwest of Bruntál. It lies in the Hrubý Jeseník mountain range. The highest point is the rock Rolandův kámen at 910 m (2,986 ft) above sea level. The village is situated in the valley of the Bílá Opava River, a tributary of the Opava.

== History ==
The first written mention of Karlova Studánka is from 1554, under its original name Hinnewieder. The first spa buildings were built in 1782. The village was renamed Karlsbrunn/Karlova Studánka in 1803 in honour of Archduke Charles, who defeated Napoleon in the Battle of Aspern-Essling.

== Demographics ==
Historical population

Year	Pop.	±%
1869	50	—
1880	42	−16.0%
1890	50	+19.0%
1900	45	−10.0%
1910	67	+48.9%

Year	Pop.	±%
1921	71	+6.0%
1930	149	+109.9%
1950	331	+122.1%
1961	230	−30.5%
1970	244	+6.1%

Year	Pop.	±%
1980	261	+7.0%
1991	228	−12.6%
2001	230	+0.9%
2011	215	−6.5%
2021	138	−35.8%

Source: Censuses

== Economy ==
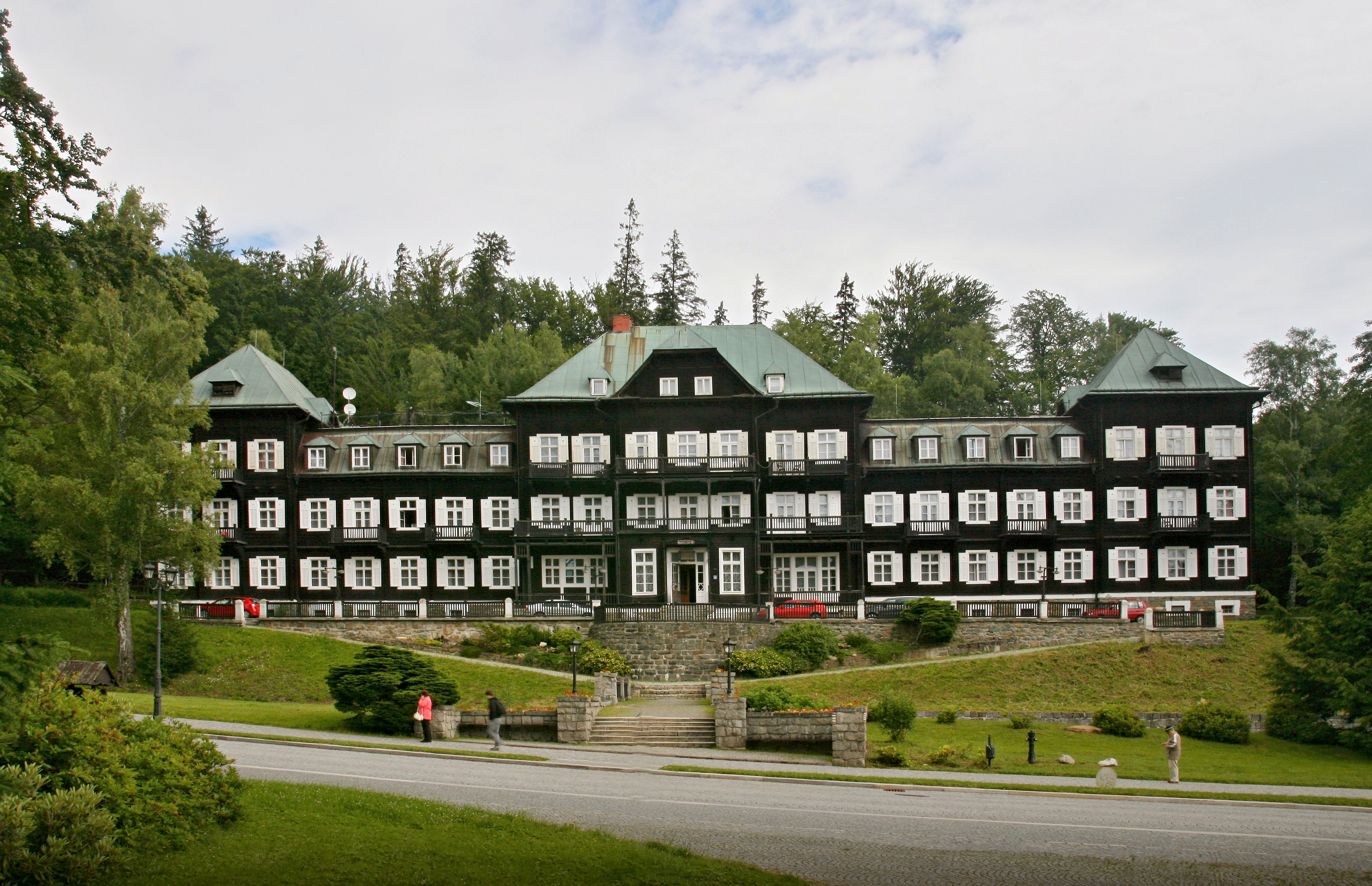
House No. 3, the so-called Slezský dům

The main employer in the municipality is the spa company Horské lázně Karlova Studánka (lit. 'mountain spa Karlova Studánka'). It employs more than 200 people. Therapeutic elements include a climate with very clean air, natural carbon dioxide and mineral water, which is used for carbonic baths and peat wraps, inhalation and drinking. Today the spa company is owned by the state. It specialises in the treatment of dusty lung diseases and non-tuberculous respiratory diseases.

== Transport ==
There are no railways or major roads passing through the municipality.

== Sport ==
In the municipality is a small ski area called Pradědova aréna. There is a 550 m (1,800 ft) long ski slope with a lift.

== Sights ==
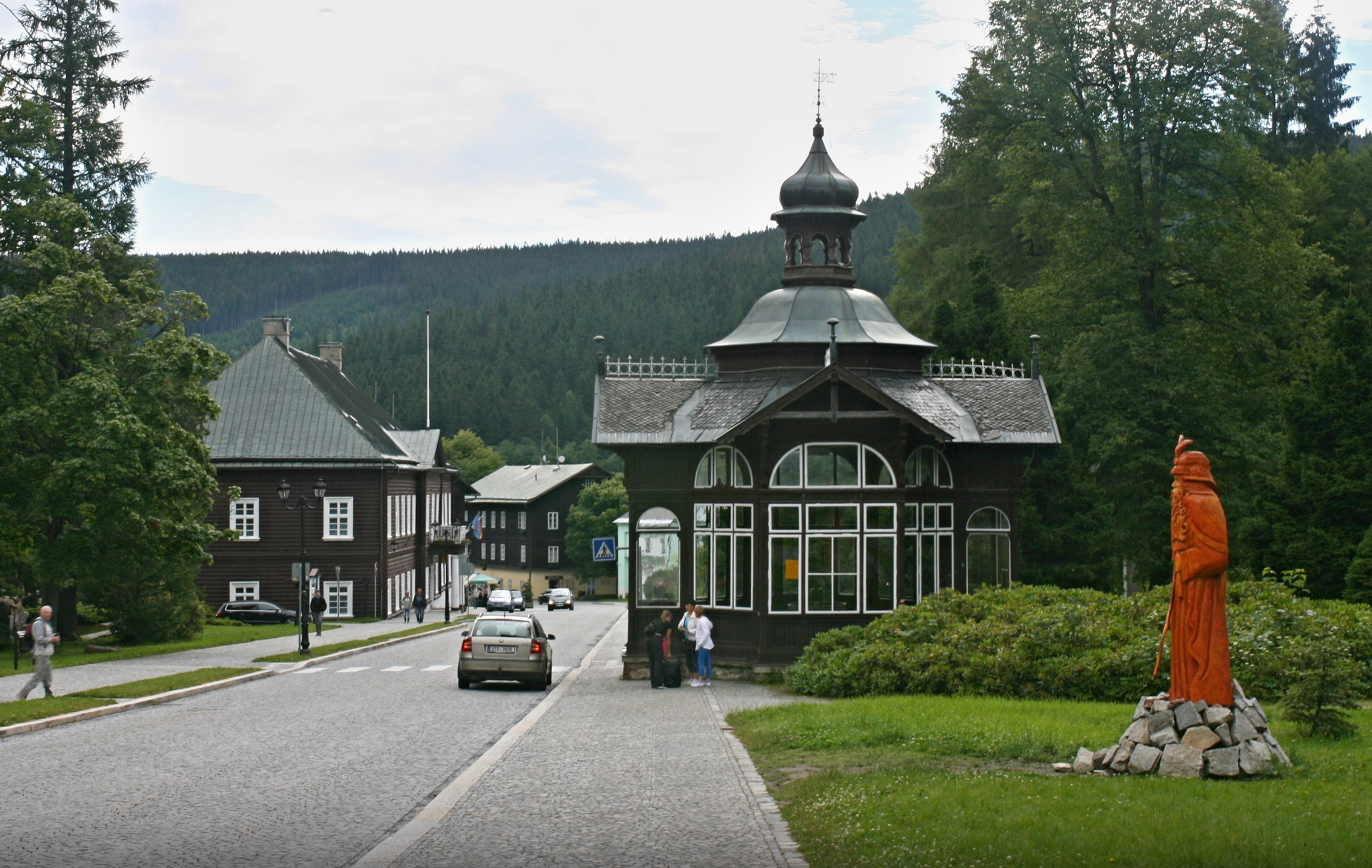
Pitný pavilon and the main street

The built-up area is protected as a village monument zone for its exceptionally well-preserved and complete set of spa houses and facilities, mainly timbered. The buildings dates from the 18th century, and were modified and supplemented during the 19th century.

The spa includes a park with a geological exposition of rocks and an artificial waterfall. The most notable building is the wooden Pitný pavilon ('drinking pavilion') from 1895, where the Wilhelm Spring is located. The waterfall was built in the 19th century and has a height of 20 metres (66 ft).

A notable monument is the Church of Our Lady of the Healing of the Sick. It was built in the Empire style in 1838–1840, on the initiative of the Teutonic Knights order.
