= Karlous Marx Shinohamba =

Namibian politician

Karlous Marx Shinohamba (born February 3, 1965) is a Namibian politician, affiliated to the South West Africa People's Organization (SWAPO) party. He became a member of the National Council for Ohangwena Region in November 2001. He is a member of the Pan-African Parliament.
