= Tivadar Kardos =

Hungarian chess composer

Tivadar Kardos
La Scacchiera, 1952

Position: h8 black queen, f7 white knight, g7 white pawn, h7 black pawn, f6 white pawn, g6 white pawn, f5 black king, g5 white pawn, a3 white king, f1 white knight

Helpmate in two moves.
Click for solution
1.Ke6! Ne3 2.Qf8+! gxf8N#
(set play: 1...Ng3+ 2.Kxg6 gxh8N#)

Tivadar Kardos (September 26, 1921 in Budapest – May 15, 1998) was a Hungarian chess composer and an author of chess-related material.
